= Ezra Pound =

American poet and critic (1885–1972)

Pound photographed in 1913 by Alvin Langdon Coburn

Ezra Weston Loomis Pound (30 October 1885 – 1 November 1972) was an American poet and critic, a major figure in the early modernist poetry movement, and a collaborator in Fascist Italy and the Salò Republic during World War II. His works include Ripostes (1912), Hugh Selwyn Mauberley (1920), and The Cantos (c. 1915–1962).

Pound's contribution to poetry began in the early 20th century with his role in developing Imagism, a movement stressing precision and economy of language. Working in London as foreign editor of several American literary magazines, he helped to discover and shape the work of contemporaries such as H.D., Robert Frost, T. S. Eliot, Ernest Hemingway, and James Joyce. He was responsible for the 1914 serialization of Joyce's A Portrait of the Artist as a Young Man, the 1915 publication of Eliot's "The Love Song of J. Alfred Prufrock", and the serialization from 1918 of Joyce's Ulysses. Hemingway wrote in 1932 that, for poets born in the late 19th or early 20th century, not to be influenced by Pound would be "like passing through a great blizzard and not feeling its cold". (Note: On 21 November 1932 Hemingway wrote ("Statement on Ezra Pound", The Cantos of Ezra Pound: Some Testimonies, New York: Farrar & Rinehart, 1933): "Any poet born in this century or in the last ten years of the preceding century who can honestly say that he has not been influenced by or learned greatly from the work of Ezra Pound deserves to be pitied rather than rebuked. It is as if a prose writer born in that time should not have learned from or been influenced by James Joyce or that a traveller should pass through a great blizzard and not have felt its cold or a sandstorm and not have felt the sand and the wind. The best of Pound's writing—and it is in the CANTOS—will last as long as there is any literature.")

Angered by the carnage of World War I, Pound blamed the war on finance capitalism, which he called "usury". He moved to Italy in 1924 and through the 1930s and 1940s promoted an economic theory known as social credit, wrote for publications owned by the British fascist Oswald Mosley, embraced Benito Mussolini's fascism, and expressed support for Adolf Hitler. During World War II, Pound recorded hundreds of paid radio propaganda broadcasts for the fascist Italian government and its later incarnation as a German puppet state, in which he attacked the United States government, Franklin D. Roosevelt, Britain, international finance, the arms industry, Jews, and others as abettors and prolongers of the war. He also praised both eugenics and the Holocaust in Italy, while urging American G.I.s to throw down their rifles and surrender. In 1945, Pound was captured by the Italian Resistance and handed over to the U.S. Army's Counterintelligence Corps, who held him pending extradition and prosecution based on an indictment for treason. He spent months in a U.S. military detention camp near Pisa, including three weeks in an outdoor steel cage. Ruled mentally unfit to stand trial, Pound was incarcerated for over 12 years at St. Elizabeths Hospital in Washington, D.C.

While in U.S. military custody in Italy, Pound continued work on The Cantos. This new work was published by New Directions in 1948 as The Pisan Cantos, for which Pound was awarded the Bollingen Prize for Poetry in 1949 by the American Library of Congress, leading to enormous controversy. After a campaign by his fellow writers, he was released from St. Elizabeths in 1958 and returned to Italy, where he posed for the press giving the Fascist salute and called the United States "an insane asylum". Pound remained in Italy until his death in 1972. His economic and political views have ensured that his life and literary legacy remain highly controversial.

== Early life and education (1885–1908) ==
=== Family background ===
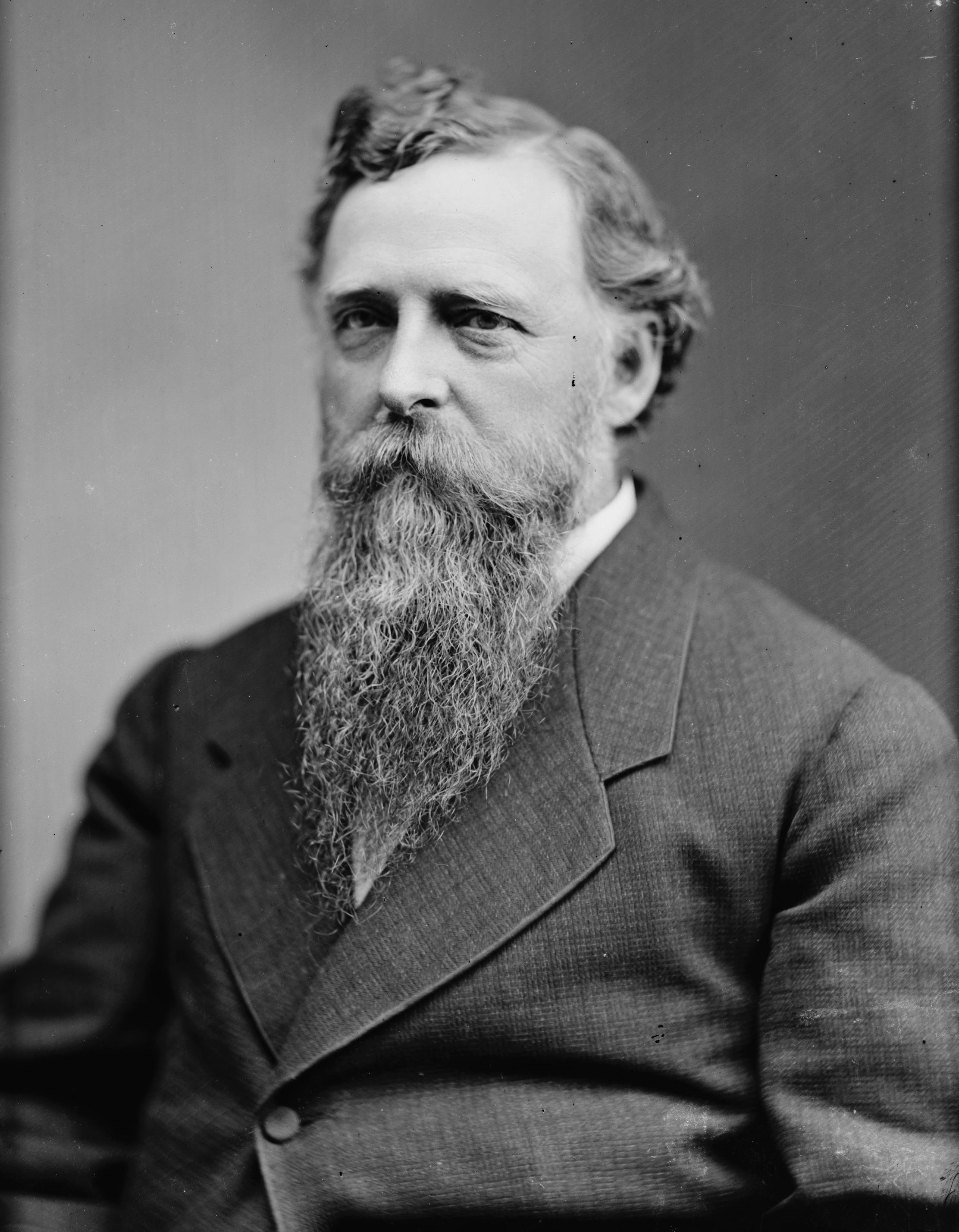
Thaddeus Coleman Pound, Pound's paternal grandfather, in the late 1880s

Pound was born in 1885 in a two-story clapboard house in Hailey in the Idaho Territory as the only child of Homer Loomis Pound and Isabel Weston, who married in 1884. Homer had worked in Hailey since 1883 as registrar of the United States General Land Office. Ezra Pound's paternal grandfather, Thaddeus Coleman Pound, a Republican Party member of the U.S. House of Representatives and the 10th lieutenant governor of Wisconsin, had secured Homer the job. Homer had previously worked for Thaddeus in the lumber business.

Both sides of Pound's family had emigrated from England in the 17th century. On his father's side, the immigrant ancestor was John Pound, a Quaker who had arrived from England around 1650. Ezra's paternal grandmother, Susan Angevine Loomis, married Thaddeus Coleman Pound. On his mother's side, Pound was descended from William Wadsworth, a Puritan who had immigrated to Boston on the Lion in 1632 and whose son Joseph Wadsworth helped to write the first Connecticut constitution. The Wadsworths married into the Westons of New York; Harding Weston and Mary Parker were Pound's maternal grandparents. After serving in the military, Harding remained unemployed, so his brother Ezra Weston and Ezra's wife, Frances Amelia Wessells Freer (Aunt Frank), helped to look after Isabel, Pound's mother.

=== Early education ===
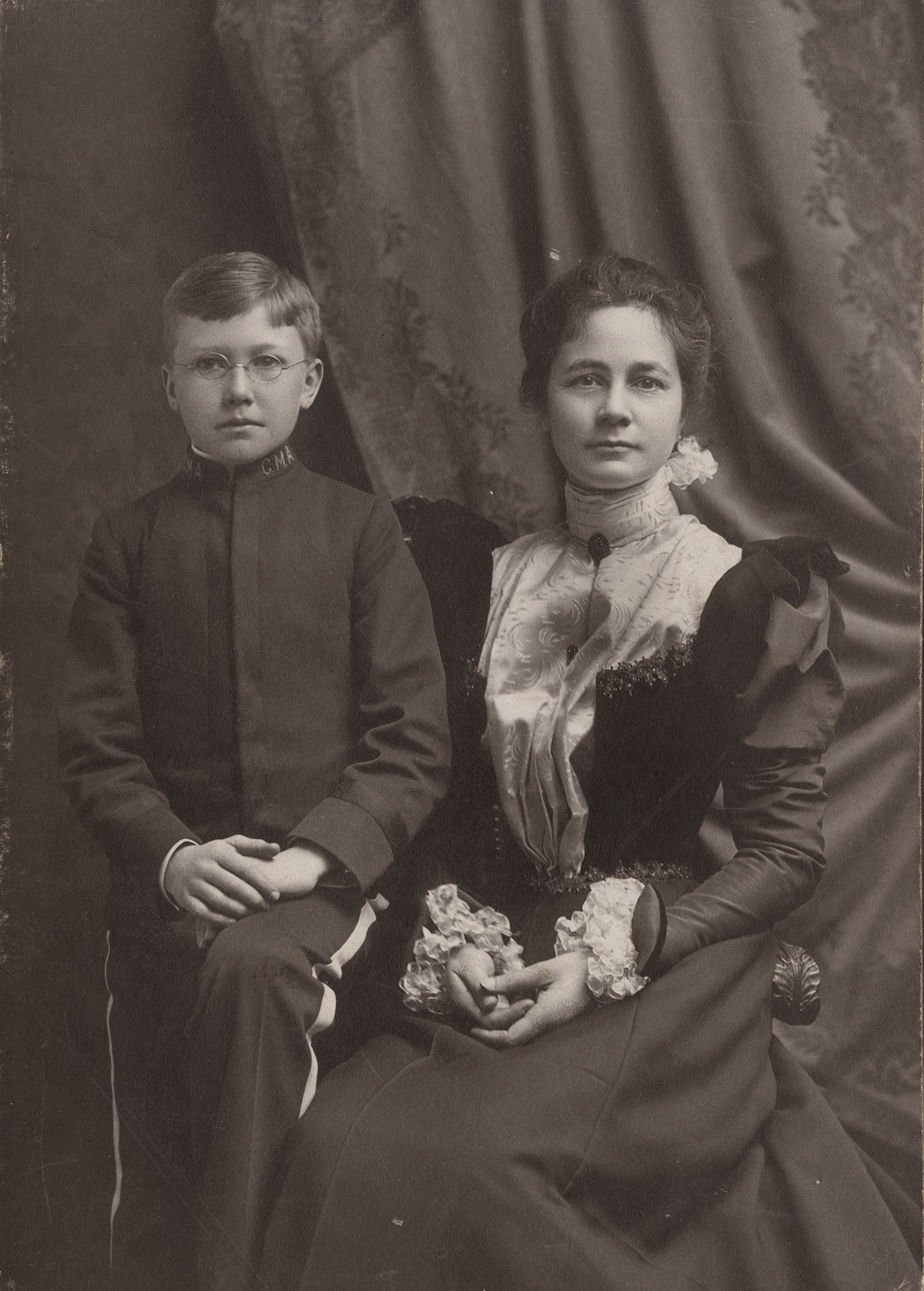
In his Cheltenham Military Academy uniform with his mother, 1898

Isabel Pound was unhappy in Hailey and took Ezra with her to New York in 1887 when he was 18 months old. Her husband followed and found a job as an assayer at the Philadelphia Mint. After a move to 417 Walnut Street in Jenkintown, Pennsylvania, in 1893 the family bought a six-bedroom house at 166 Fernbrook Avenue in nearby Wyncote. Pound's education began in dame schools: Miss Elliott's school in Jenkintown in 1892 and the Heathcock family's Chelten Hills School in Wyncote in 1893. Known as "Ra" (pronounced "Ray"), he attended Wyncote Public School from September 1894. His first publication was on 7 November 1896 in the Jenkintown Times-Chronicle ("by E. L. Pound, Wyncote, aged 11 years"), a limerick about William Jennings Bryan, who had just lost the 1896 presidential election. (Note: "There was a young man from the West, / He did what he could for what he thought best; / But election came round; / He found himself drowned, / And the papers will tell you the rest.")

In 1897, aged 12, he transferred to Cheltenham Military Academy (CMA), where he wore an American Civil War-style uniform and was taught drilling and how to shoot. The following year he made his first trip overseas, a three-month tour with his mother and Aunt Frank, who took him to England, Belgium, Germany, Switzerland, Italy, Spain, and Morocco. He attended CMA until 1900, at times as a boarder, but it seems he did not graduate. (Note: Pound may have attended Cheltenham Township High School for the school year 1900–1901.)

=== University ===
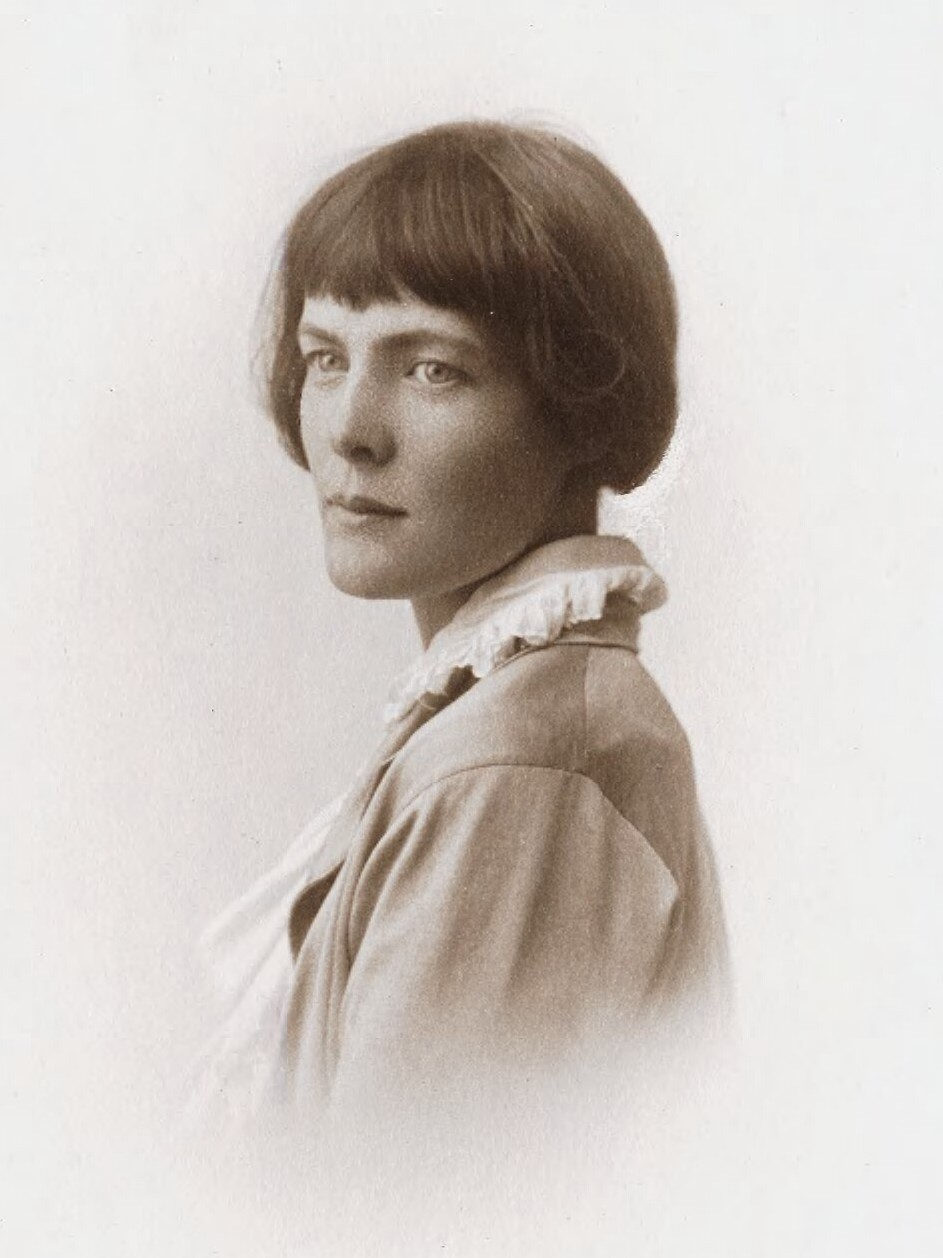
Hilda Doolittle (H.D.), c. 1921

In 1901, at 15 years old, Pound was admitted to the College of Liberal Arts at the University of Pennsylvania in Philadelphia. Years later he said his aim was to avoid drill at the military academy. His one distinction in first year was in geometry, but otherwise his grades were mostly poor, including in Latin, his major; he achieved a B in English composition and a pass in English literature. In his second year he switched from the degree course to "non-degree special student status", he said "to avoid irrelevant subjects". (Note: In "How I Began", T.P.'s Weekly (6 June 1913), Pound wrote: "I resolved that at thirty I would know more about poetry than any man living, that I would know the dynamic content from the shell, that I would know what was accounted poetry everywhere, what part of poetry was 'indestructible', what part could not be lost by translation and—scarcely less important—what effects were obtainable in one language only and were utterly incapable of being translated. "In this search I learned more or less of nine languages, I read Oriental stuff in translations, I fought every University regulation and every professor who tried to make me learn anything except this, or who bothered me with 'requirements for degrees'.") He was not elected to a fraternity at Penn, but it seemed not to bother him.

His parents and Aunt Frank took him on another three-month European tour in 1902, and the following year he transferred to Hamilton College in Clinton, New York, possibly because of his grades. Again he was not invited to join a fraternity, but this time he had hoped to do so, according to letters home, because he wanted to live in a fraternity house, and by April 1904 he regarded the move as a mistake. Signed up for the Latin–Scientific course, he appears to have avoided some classes; his transcript is short of credits. He studied the Provençal dialect of the Occitan Language and read Dante Alighieri and Anglo-Saxon poetry, including Beowulf and the 8th-century Old English poem The Seafarer.

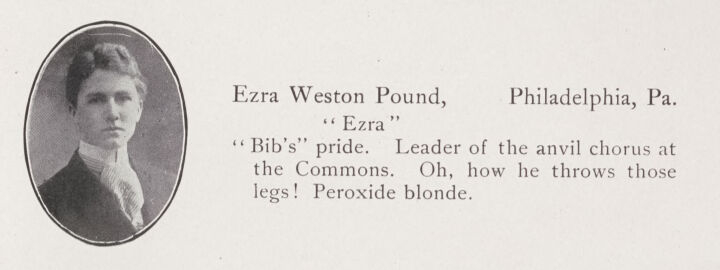
Pound in the Hamilton College yearbook, 1905

After graduating from Hamilton in 1905 with a PhB, he returned to Penn, where he fell in love with Hilda Doolittle (who later wrote under the name "H.D."). She was then a student at Bryn Mawr College, and he hand-bound 25 of his poems for her, calling it Hilda's Book. After receiving his MA in Romance languages in 1906, he registered to write a PhD thesis on the jesters in Lope de Vega's plays; a two-year Harrison fellowship covered his tuition and a $500 grant, with which he sailed again to Europe. He spent three weeks in Madrid in various libraries, including in the Royal Library. On 31 May 1906 he was standing outside the palace during the attempted assassination of King Alfonso XIII and left the city for fear of being mistaken for an anarchist. After Spain he visited Paris and London, returning to the United States in July 1906. His first essay, "Raphaelite Latin", was published in the Book News Monthly that September. He took courses in English in 1907, where he fell out with just about everyone, including the department head, Felix Schelling, with silly remarks during lectures and by winding an enormous tin watch very slowly while Schelling spoke. In the spring of 1907 he learned that his fellowship would not be renewed. Schelling told him he was wasting everyone's time, and he left without finishing his doctorate.

=== Teaching ===
In Durance

I am homesick after mine own kind,
Oh I know that there are folk about me, friendly faces,
But I am homesick after mine own kind.

— Personae of Ezra Pound (1909)
written in Crawfordsville, Indiana, 1907

From September 1907 Pound taught French and Spanish at Wabash College, a Presbyterian college with 345 students in Crawfordsville, Indiana, which he called "the sixth circle of hell". One former student remembered him as a breath of fresh air; another said he was "exhibitionist, egotistic, self-centered and self-indulgent".

He was dismissed after a few months. Smoking was forbidden, but he would smoke cigarillos in his room in the same corridor as the president's office. He was asked to leave the college in January 1908 when his landladies, Ida and Belle Hall, found a woman in his room. Shocked at having been expelled, he left for Europe soon after, sailing from New York in March on the RMS Slavonia.

== London (1908–1914) ==
=== A Lume Spento ===
Pound arrived in Gibraltar on 23 March 1908, where he earned US$15 a day working as a guide for an American family there and in Spain. After stops in Seville, Granada, and Genoa, by the end of April he was in Venice, living over a bakery near the San Vio bridge. In the summer he decided to self-publish his first collection of 44 poems in the 72-page A Lume Spento ("With Tapers Quenched"), 150 copies of which were printed in July 1908. The title is from the third canto of Dante Alighieri's Purgatorio, alluding to the death of Manfred, King of Sicily. Pound dedicated the book to the Philadelphia artist William Brooke Smith, a friend from university who had recently died of tuberculosis.

In "Canto LXXVI" of The Pisan Cantos, he records that he considered throwing the proofs into the Grand Canal, abandoning the book and poetry altogether: "by the soap-smooth stone posts where San Vio / meets with il Canal Grande / between Salviati and the house that was of Don Carlos / shd/I chuck the lot into the tide-water? / le bozze "A Lume Spento"/ / and by the column of Todero / shd/I shift to the other side / or wait 24 hours".

=== Move to London ===
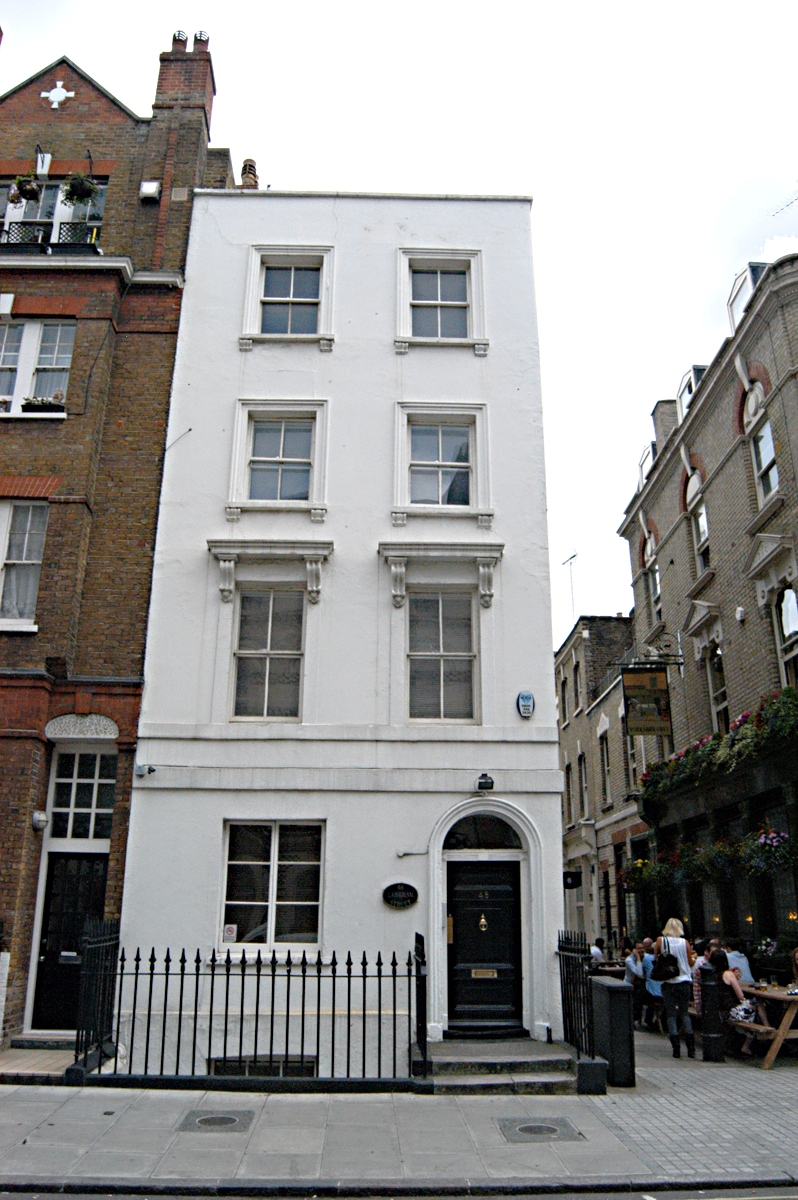
48 Langham Street, Fitzrovia, London W1

In August 1908 Pound moved to London, carrying 60 copies of A Lume Spento. English poets such as Maurice Hewlett, Rudyard Kipling, and Alfred Tennyson had made a particular kind of Victorian verse—stirring, pompous, and propagandistic—popular. According to modernist scholar James Knapp, Pound rejected the idea of poetry as "versified moral essay"; he wanted to focus on the individual experience, the concrete rather than the abstract.

Pound at first stayed in a boarding house at 8 Duchess Street, near the British Museum Reading Room; he had met the landlady during his travels in Europe in 1906. He soon moved to Islington (cheaper at 12s 6d a week board and lodging), but his father sent him £4, and he was able to move back into Central London, to 48 Langham Street, near Great Titchfield Street. The house sat across an alley from the Yorkshire Grey pub, which made an appearance in "Canto LXXX" (The Pisan Cantos), "concerning the landlady's doings / with a lodger unnamed / az waz near Gt Tichfield St. next door to the pub".

Pound persuaded the bookseller Elkin Mathews on Vigo Street to display A Lume Spento, and in an unsigned article on 26 November 1908, Pound reviewed it himself in the Evening Standard: "The unseizable magic of poetry is in this queer paper book; and words are no good in describing it." The following month he self-published a second collection, A Quinzaine for this Yule. It was his first book to have commercial success, and Elkin Matthews had another 100 copies printed. In January and February 1909, after the death of John Churton Collins left a vacancy, Pound lectured for an hour a week in the evenings on "The Development of Literature in Southern Europe" at the Regent Street Polytechnic. (Note: Pound's advertised lectures were: 21 January 1909: "Introductory Lecture. The Search for the Essential Qualities of Literature".; 28 January: The Rise of Song in Provence".; 4 February: "Mediaeval Religious Feeling".; 11 February: "Trade with the East".; 18 February: "Latin Lyrists of the Renaissance".; 25 February: "Books and Their Makers during the Middle Ages".) Mornings might be spent in the British Museum Reading Room, followed by lunch at the Vienna Café on Oxford Street, where Pound first met the painter and writer Wyndham Lewis in 1910. "There were mysterious figures / that emerged from recondite recesses / and ate at the WIENER CAFÉ". Ford Madox Ford described Pound as "approach[ing] with the step of a dancer, making passes with a cane at an imaginary opponent": "He would wear trousers made of green billiard cloth, a pink coat, a blue shirt, a tie hand-painted by a Japanese friend, an immense sombrero, a flaming beard cut to a point, and a single, large blue earring."

=== Meeting Dorothy Shakespear, Personae ===
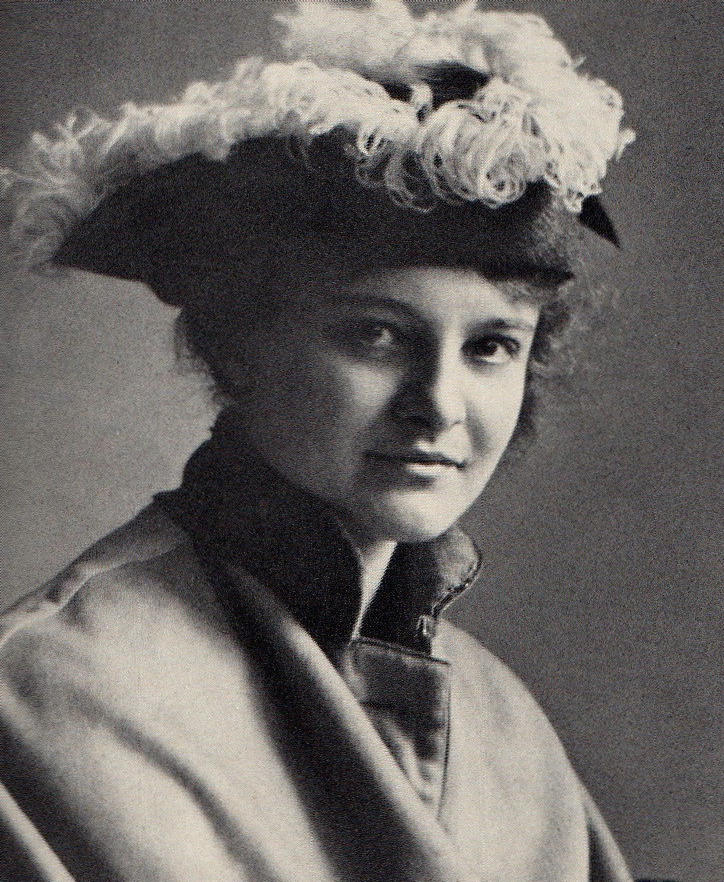
Pound married Dorothy Shakespear in 1914.

At a literary salon in 1909, Pound met the novelist Olivia Shakespear and later at the Shakespears' home at 12 Brunswick Gardens, Kensington, was introduced to her daughter, Dorothy, who became Pound's wife in 1914. The critic Iris Barry described her as "carrying herself delicately with the air, always, of a young Victorian lady out skating, and a profile as clear and lovely as that of a porcelain Kuan-yin". "Listen to it—Ezra! Ezra!—And a third time—Ezra!", Dorothy wrote in her diary on 16 February 1909.

Pound mixed with the cream of London's literary circle, including Hewlett, Laurence Binyon, Frederic Manning, Ernest Rhys, May Sinclair, Ellen Terry, George Bernard Shaw, Hilaire Belloc, T. E. Hulme, and F. S. Flint. Through the Shakespears, he was introduced to the poet W. B. Yeats, Olivia Shakespear's former lover. He had already sent Yeats a copy of A Lume Spento, and Yeats had apparently found it "charming". Pound wrote to William Carlos Williams on 3 February 1909: "Am by way of falling into the crowd that does things here. London, deah old Lundon, is the place for poesy." According to Richard Aldington, London found Pound amusing. The newspapers interviewed him, and he was mentioned in Punch magazine, which on 23 June 1909 described "Mr. Ezekiel Ton" as "the most remarkable thing in poetry since Robert Browning ... [blending] the imagery of the unfettered West, the vocabulary of Wardour Street, and the sinister abandon of Borgiac Italy".

Erat Hora

"Thank you, whatever comes." And then she turned
And, as the ray of sun on hanging flowers
Fades when the wind hath lifted them aside,
Went swiftly from me. Nay, whatever comes
One hour was sunlit and the most high gods
May not make boast of any better thing
Than to have watched that hour as it passed.

— Personae: The Collected Poems of Ezra Pound (1926)

In April 1909 Elkin Mathews published Personae of Ezra Pound (half the poems were from A Lume Spento) (Note: Personae (1909) was dedicated to Mary Moore: "This book is for Mary Moore of Trenton, if she wants it." He asked Moore to marry him, but she turned him down.) and in October a further 27 poems (16 new) as Exultations. The British poet Edward Thomas described Personae in English Review as "full of human passion and natural magic". Rupert Brooke complained in the Cambridge Review that Pound had fallen under the influence of the American poet Walt Whitman, writing in "unmetrical sprawling lengths that, in his hands, have nothing to commend them". But he did acknowledge that Pound had "great talents".

In or around September, Pound moved into new rooms at Church Walk, off Kensington High Street, where he lived most of the time until 1914. He visited a friend, Walter Rummel, in Paris in March 1910 and was introduced to the American heiress and pianist Margaret Lanier Cravens. Although they had only just met, she offered to become a patron at $1,000 a year, and from then until her death in 1912 she apparently sent him money regularly.

=== The Spirit of Romance, Canzoni, the New Age ===
In June 1910 Pound returned for eight months to the United States; his arrival coincided with the publication in London of his first book of literary criticism, The Spirit of Romance, based on his lecture notes from the polytechnic. Patria Mia, his essays on the United States, were written at this time. In August he moved to New York, renting rooms on Waverly Place and Park Avenue South, facing Gramercy Square. Although he loved New York, he felt alienated by the commercialism and newcomers from Eastern and Southern Europe who were displacing the white Anglo-Saxon Protestants. The recently built New York Public Library Main Branch he found especially offensive. During this period his antisemitism became apparent; he referred in Patria Mia to the "detestable qualities" of Jews. After persuading his parents to finance his passage back to Europe, he sailed from New York on the RMS Mauretania on 22 February 1911. It was nearly 30 years—April 1939—before he visited the U.S. again.

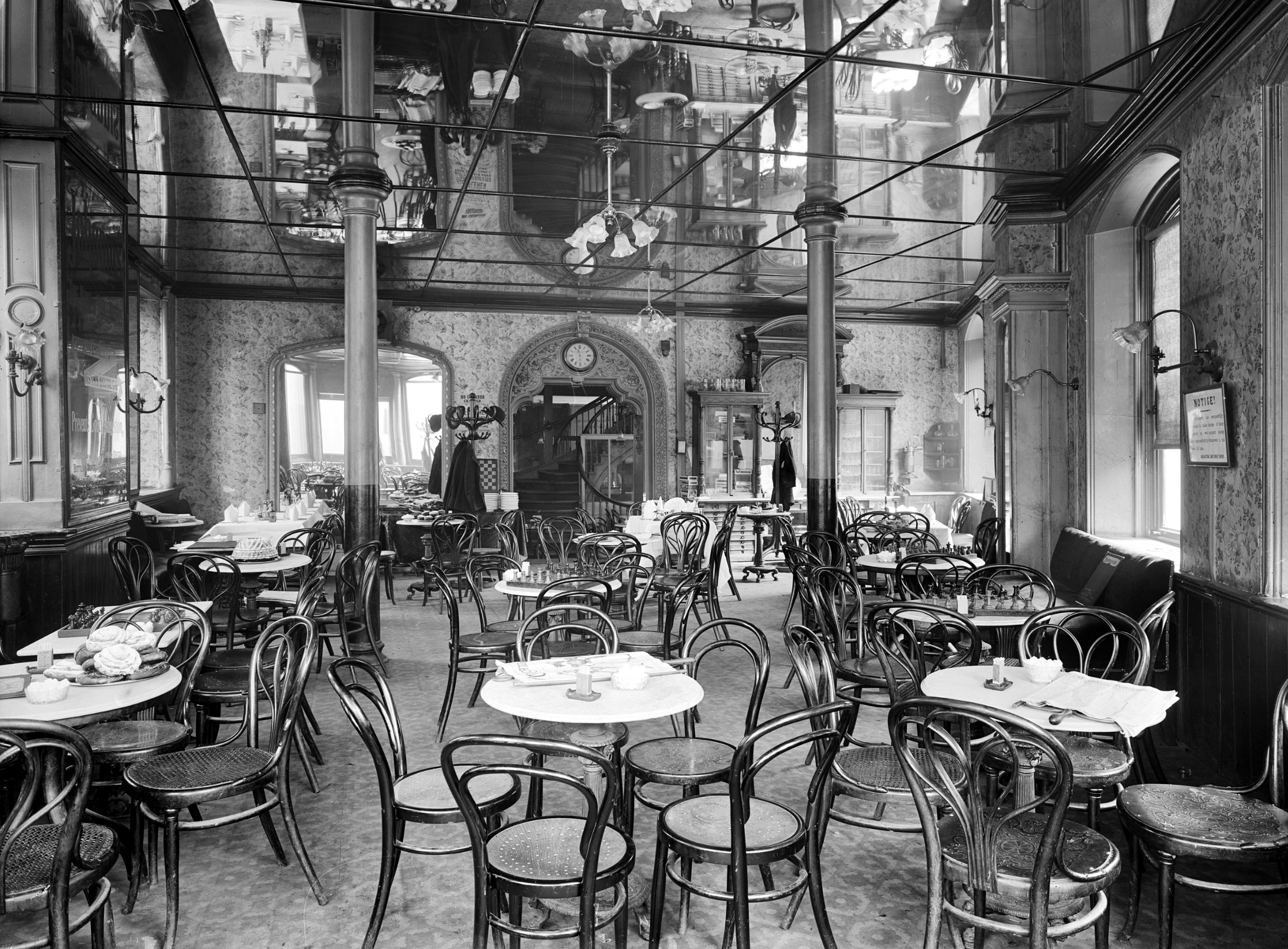
First floor of the Vienna Café with its mirrored ceiling, Oxford Street, in 1897. The room became a meeting place for Pound, Wyndham Lewis, and other writers.

After three days in London he went to Paris, where he worked on a new collection of poetry, Canzoni (1911), panned by The Westminster Gazette as "affectation combined with pedantry". He wrote in Ford Madox Ford's obituary that Ford had rolled on the floor with laughter at its "stilted language". When he returned to London in August, he rented a room in Marylebone at 2A Granville Place, then shared a house at 39 Addison Road North, W11. By November A. R. Orage, editor of the socialist journal The New Age, had hired him to write a weekly column. Orage appears in The Cantos (Possum is T. S. Eliot): "but the lot of 'em, Yeats, Possum and Wyndham / had no ground beneath 'em. / Orage had."

Pound contributed to the New Age from 30 November 1911 to 13 January 1921, attending editorial meetings in the basement of a grimy ABC tearoom in Chancery Lane. There and at other meetings he met Arnold Bennett, Cecil Chesterton, Beatrice Hastings, S. G. Hobson, Hulme, Katherine Mansfield, and H. G. Wells. In the New Age office in 1918, he also met C. H. Douglas, a British engineer who was developing his economic theory of social credit, which Pound found attractive. Douglas reportedly believed that Jews were a problem and needed to abandon a Messianic view of themselves as the "dominating race". According to Colin Holmes, The New Age itself published antisemitic material. It was within this environment, not in Italy, according to Tim Redman, that Pound first encountered antisemitic ideas about "usury". "In Douglas's program," Christopher Hitchens wrote in 2008, "Pound had found his true muse: a blend of folkloric Celtic twilight with a paranoid hatred of the money economy and a dire suspicion about an ancient faith."

=== Poetry magazine, Ripostes, Imagism ===
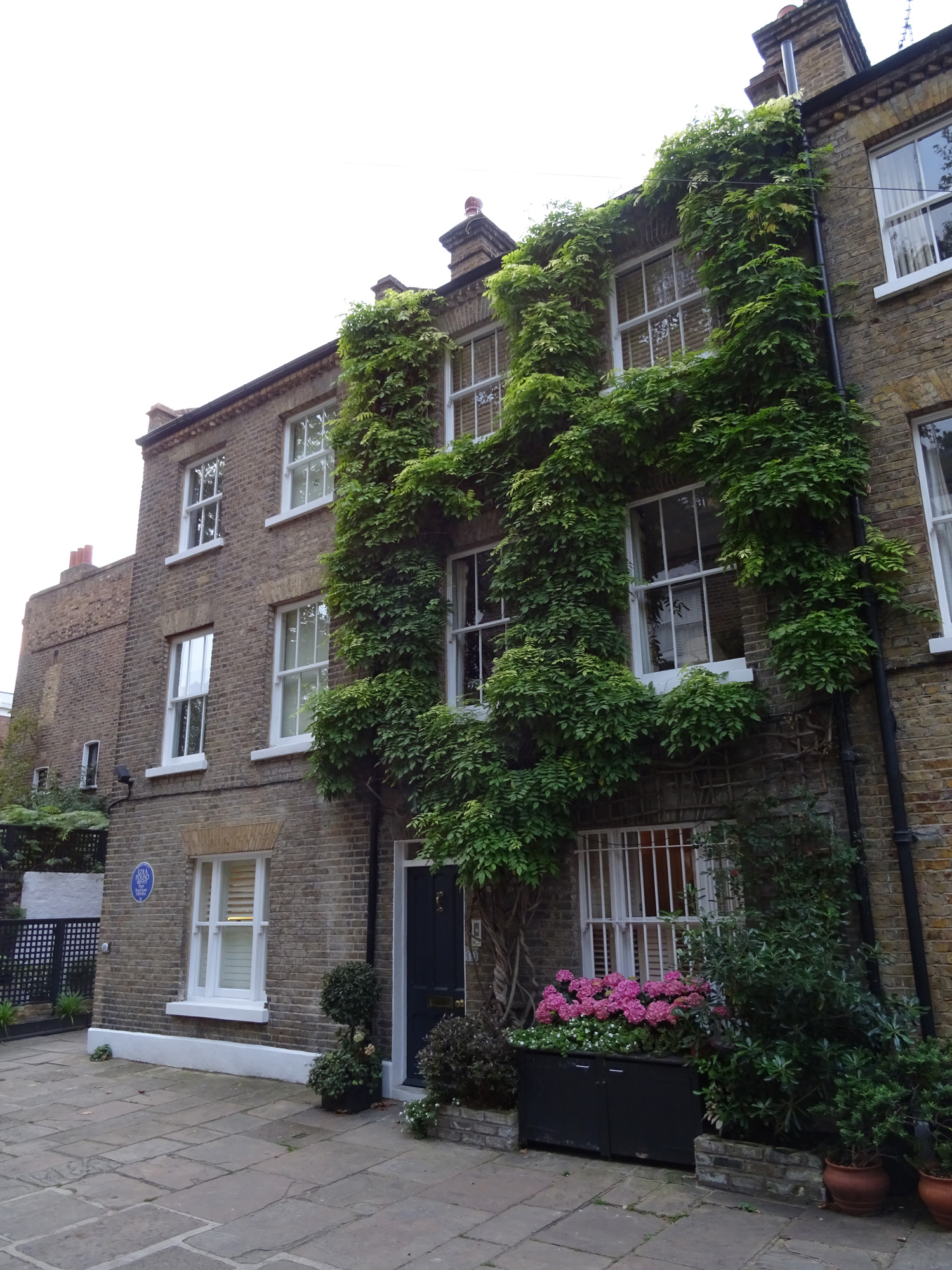
10 Church Walk, Kensington, London W8. Pound lived on the first floor (far left) in 1909–1910 and 1911–1914. (Note: Pound lived on the first floor of 10 Church Walk, Kensington, from September 1909 – June 1910 and November 1911 – April 1914. According to Moody, the two first-floor windows on the left were Pound's. According to Humphrey Carpenter, Pound was on the top floor behind the window on the far left.)

In May 1911, H.D. left Philadelphia for London. She was accompanied by the poet Frances Gregg and Gregg's mother; when they returned in September, H.D. stayed on. Pound introduced her to his friends, including Aldington, who became her husband in 1913. Before that, the three of them lived in Church Walk, Kensington—Pound at No. 10, Aldington at No. 8, and Doolittle at No. 6—and worked daily in the Reading Room of the British Museum.

At the British Museum, Laurence Binyon introduced Pound to the East Asian artistic and literary concepts Pound used in his later poetry, including Japanese ukiyo-e prints. The visitors' book first shows Pound in the Prints and Drawings Students' Room (known as the Print Room) on 9 February 1909, and later in 1912 and 1913, with Dorothy Shakespear, examining Chinese and Japanese art. Pound was working at the time on the poems that became Ripostes (1912), trying to move away from his earlier work. "I hadn't in 1910 made a language", he wrote years later. "I don't mean a language to use, but even a language to think in." (Note: "What obfuscated me was not the Italian but the crust of dead English, the sediment present in my own available vocabulary, which I, let us hope, got rid of a few years later. You can't go round this sort of thing. It takes six or eight years to get educated in one's art, and another ten to get rid of that education. "Neither can anyone learn English, one can only learn a series of Englishes. Rossetti made his own language. I hadn't in 1910 made a language, I don't mean a language to use, but even a language to think in.")

In August 1912 Harriet Monroe hired Pound as foreign correspondent of Poetry: A Magazine of Verse, a new magazine in Chicago. The first edition, in October, featured two of his own poems—"To Whistler, American" and "Middle Aged". Also that month Stephen Swift and Co. in London published Ripostes of Ezra Pound, a collection of 25 poems, including a contentious translation of The Seafarer, that demonstrate his shift toward minimalist language. In addition to Pound's work, the collection contains five poems by Hulme.

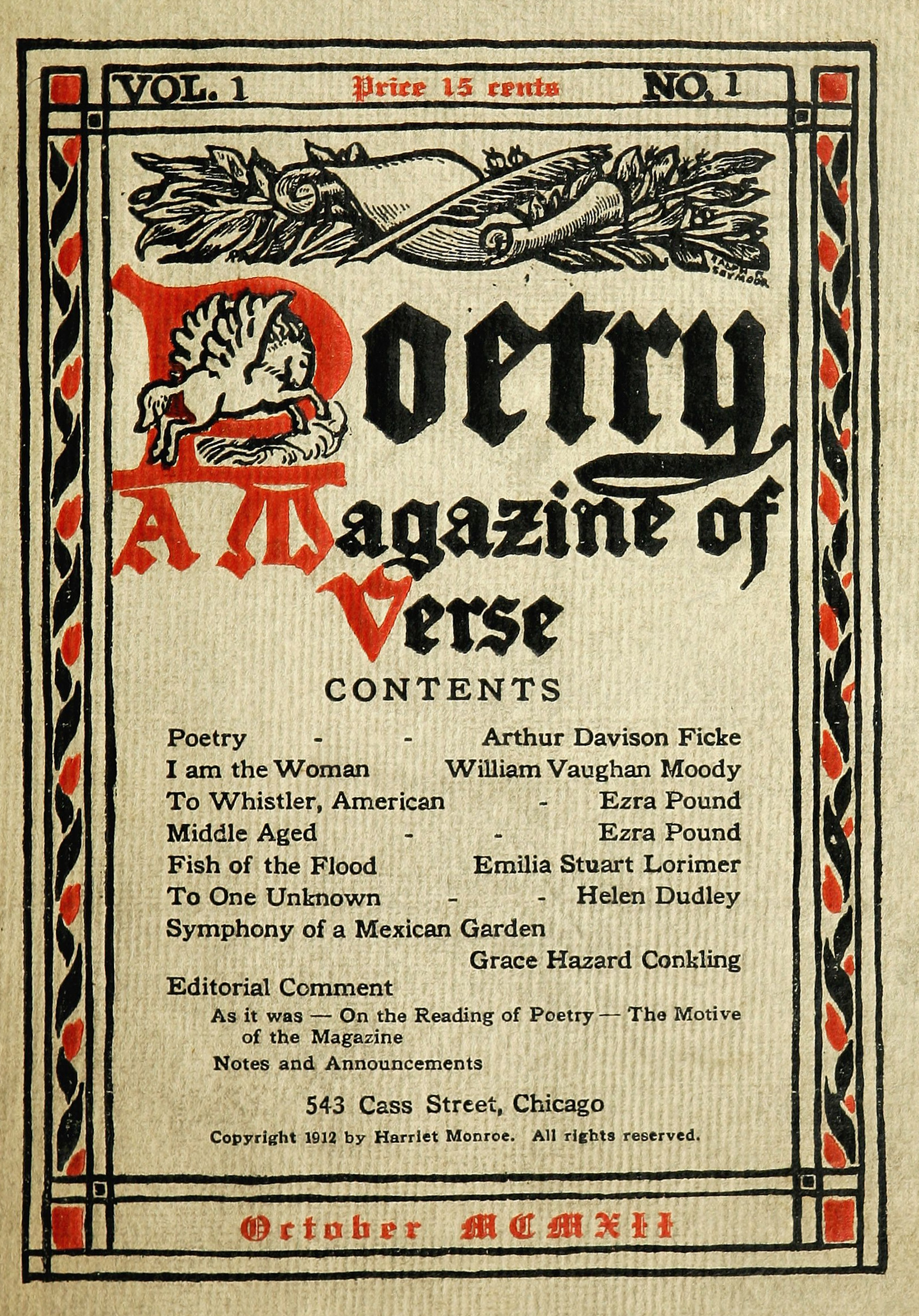
First edition of Poetry, October 1912

Ripostes includes the first mention of Les Imagistes: "As for the future, Les Imagistes, the descendants of the forgotten school of 1909, have that in their keeping." While in the British Museum tearoom one afternoon with Doolittle and Aldington, Pound edited one of Doolittle's poems and wrote "H.D. Imagiste" underneath; he described this later as the founding of a movement in poetry, Imagisme. (Note: Doolittle and Aldington said they had no recollection of this discussion.) In the spring or early summer of 1912, they agreed, Pound wrote in 1918, on three principles:

1. Direct treatment of the "thing" whether subjective or objective.
2. To use absolutely no word that does not contribute to the presentation.
3. As regarding rhythm: to compose in the sequence of the musical phrase, not in sequence of a metronome.

Poetry published Pound's "A Few Don'ts by an Imagist" in March 1913. Superfluous words, particularly adjectives, should be avoided, as well as expressions like "dim lands of peace". He wrote: "It dulls the image. It mixes an abstraction with the concrete. It comes from the writer's not realizing that the natural object is always the adequate symbol." Poets should "go in fear of abstractions". He wanted Imagisme "to stand for hard light, clear edges", he wrote later to Amy Lowell.

In a Station of the Metro

The apparition of these faces in the crowd:
Petals on a wet, black bough.

— Poetry (April 1913)

An example of Imagist poetry is Pound's "In a Station of the Metro", published in Poetry in April 1913 and inspired by an experience on the Paris Metro. "I got out of a train at, I think, La Concorde", he wrote in "How I began" in T. P.'s Weekly on 6 June 1913, "and in the jostle I saw a beautiful face, and then, turning suddenly, another and another, and then a beautiful child's face, and then another beautiful face. All that day I tried to find words for what this made me feel. ... I could get nothing but spots of colour." A year later he reduced it to its essence in the style of a Japanese haiku.

=== James Joyce, Pound's unpopularity ===
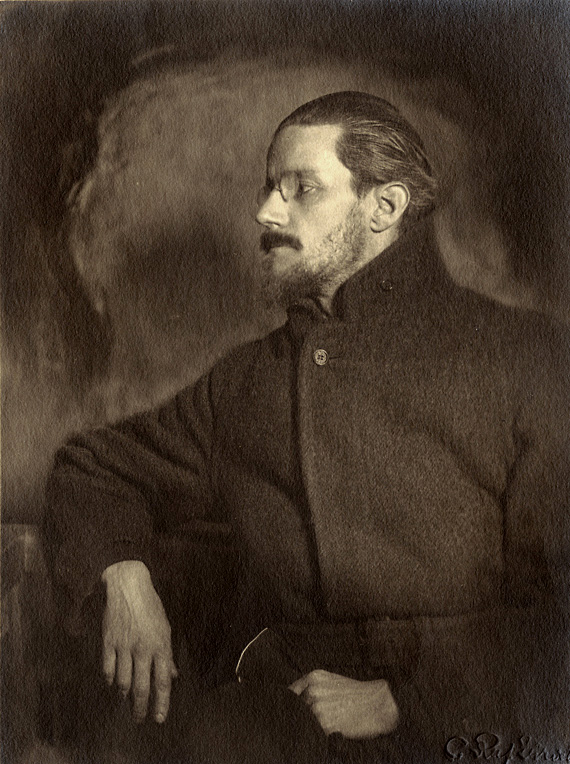
James Joyce, c. 1918

In the summer of 1913 Pound became literary editor of The Egoist, a journal founded by Dora Marsden, a suffragette. At the suggestion of W. B. Yeats, Pound encouraged James Joyce in December of that year to submit his work. The previous month Yeats, whose eyesight was failing, had rented Stone Cottage in Coleman's Hatch, Sussex, inviting Pound to accompany him as his secretary, and it was during this visit that Yeats introduced Pound to Joyce's Chamber Music and his "I hear an Army Charging Upon the Land". This was the first of three winters Pound and Yeats spent at Stone Cottage, including two with Dorothy after she and Ezra married in 1914. "Canto LXXXIII" records a visit: "so that I recalled the noise in the chimney / as it were the wind in the chimney / but was in reality Uncle William / downstairs composing / that had made a great Peeeeacock / in the proide ov his oiye." (Note: W. B. Yeats, "The Peacock": "What's riches to him / That has made a great peacock / With the pride of his eye?")

In his reply to Pound, Joyce gave permission to use "I hear an Army" and enclosed Dubliners and the first chapter of his novel A Portrait of the Artist as a Young Man. Pound wrote to Joyce that the novel was "damn fine stuff". Harriet Shaw Weaver accepted it for The Egoist, which serialized it from 2 February 1914, despite the printers objecting to words like "fart" and "ballocks", and fearing prosecution over Stephen Dedalus's thoughts about prostitutes. On the basis of the serialization, the publisher that had rejected Dubliners reconsidered. Joyce wrote to Yeats: "I can never thank you enough for having brought me into relation with your friend Ezra Pound who is indeed a miracle worker."

Around this time, Pound's articles in the New Age began to make him unpopular, to the alarm of Orage. Samuel Putnam knew Pound in Paris in the 1920s and described him as stubborn, contrary, cantankerous, bossy, touchy, and "devoid of humor"; he was "an American small-towner", in Putnam's view. His attitude caused him trouble in both London and Paris. English women, with their "preponderantly derivative" minds, were inferior to American women who had minds of their own, he wrote in the New Age. The English sense of what was right was based on respect for property, not morality. "[P]erched on the rotten shell of a crumbling empire", London had lost its energy. England's best authors—Joseph Conrad, William Henry Hudson, Henry James, and Yeats—were not English. English writers and critics were ignorant, he wrote in 1913.

=== Marriage ===
Ezra and Dorothy were married on 20 April 1914 at St Mary Abbots in Kensington, the Shakespears' parish church, despite opposition from her parents, who worried about Ezra's income. His concession to marry in church had helped. Dorothy's annual income was £50, with another £150 from her family, and Ezra's was £200. Her father, Henry Hope Shakespear, had him prepare a financial statement in 1911, which showed that his main source of income was his father. After the wedding the couple moved into an apartment with no bathroom at 5 Holland Place Chambers, Kensington, next door to the newly wed H.D. and Aldington. This arrangement did not last. H.D. had been alarmed to find Ezra looking for a place to live outside the apartment building the day before his wedding. Once Dorothy and Ezra had moved into the building, Ezra would arrive unannounced at H.D.'s to discuss his writing, a habit that upset her, in part because his writing touched on private aspects of their relationship. She and Aldington decided to move several miles away to Hampstead.

=== Des Imagistes, dispute with Amy Lowell ===
Pound by Wyndham Lewis, 1919. The portrait is lost.

The appearance of Des Imagistes, An Anthology (1914), edited by Pound, "confirmed the importance" of Imagisme, according to Ira Nadel. Published in the American magazine The Glebe in February 1914 and the following month as a book, it was the first of five Imagist anthologies and the only one to contain work by Pound. It included ten poems by Richard Aldington, seven by H.D., followed by Flint, Skipwith Cannell, Lowell, Carlos Williams, James Joyce ("I Hear an Army", not an example of Imagism), six by Pound, then Hueffer (as Ford was known at the time), Allen Upward and John Cournos.

Shortly after its publication, an advertisement for Lewis's new magazine, Blast promised it would cover "Cubism, Futurism, Imagisme and all Vital Forms of Modern Art." Described by Pound as "mostly a painter's magazine with me to do the poems," and bearing the heavy influence of Futurism, Blast was the magazine of a London art movement formed by Lewis with Pound's collaboration. Pound named the movement Vorticism. (Note: Pound (1914): "The image is a radiant node or cluster ...by Pound. a VORTEX, from which, and through which, and into which, ideas are constantly rushing." "All experience rushes into this vortex," he wrote in Blast in June 1914. "All the energized past ... RACE, RACE-MEMORY, instinct charging the PLACID, NON-ENERGIZED FUTURE.") Vorticism included all the arts, and in Blast "the Imagist propaganda merged into the Vorticist." In the end, Blast was published only twice, in 1914 and 1915. In June 1914 The Times announced Lewis's new Rebel Arts Centre for Vorticist art at 38 Great Ormond Street.

Lowell, who was to win the Pulitzer Prize for Poetry in 1926, was unhappy that only one of her poems had appeared in Des Imagistes. She arrived in London in July 1914 to attend two dinners at the Dieudonné restaurant in Ryder Street, the first to celebrate the publication of Blast and the second, on 17 July, the publication of Des Imagistes. At the second, Ford Madox Hueffer announced that he had been an Imagiste long before Lowell and Pound, and that he doubted their qualifications; only Aldington and H.D. could lay claim to the title, in his view. During the subsequent row, Pound left the table and returned with a tin bathtub on his head, suggesting it as a symbol of what he called Les Nagistes, a school created by Lowell's poem "In a Garden", which ends with "Night, and the water, and you in your whiteness, bathing!" Apparently his behavior helped Lowell win people over to her point of view, as did her offer to fund future work.

H.D. and Aldington were moving away from Pound's understanding of Imagisme anyway, as he aligned himself with Lewis's ideas. Lowell agreed to finance an annual anthology of Imagiste poets, but she insisted on democracy; according to Aldington, she "proposed a Boston Tea Party for Ezra" and an end to his despotic rule. Upset at Lowell, Pound began to call Imagisme "Amygism"; he declared the movement dead and asked the group not to call themselves Imagistes. Not accepting that it was Pound's invention, they refused and Anglicized the term.

== World War I and leaving England (1914–1921) ==
=== Meeting Eliot, Cathay, translation ===
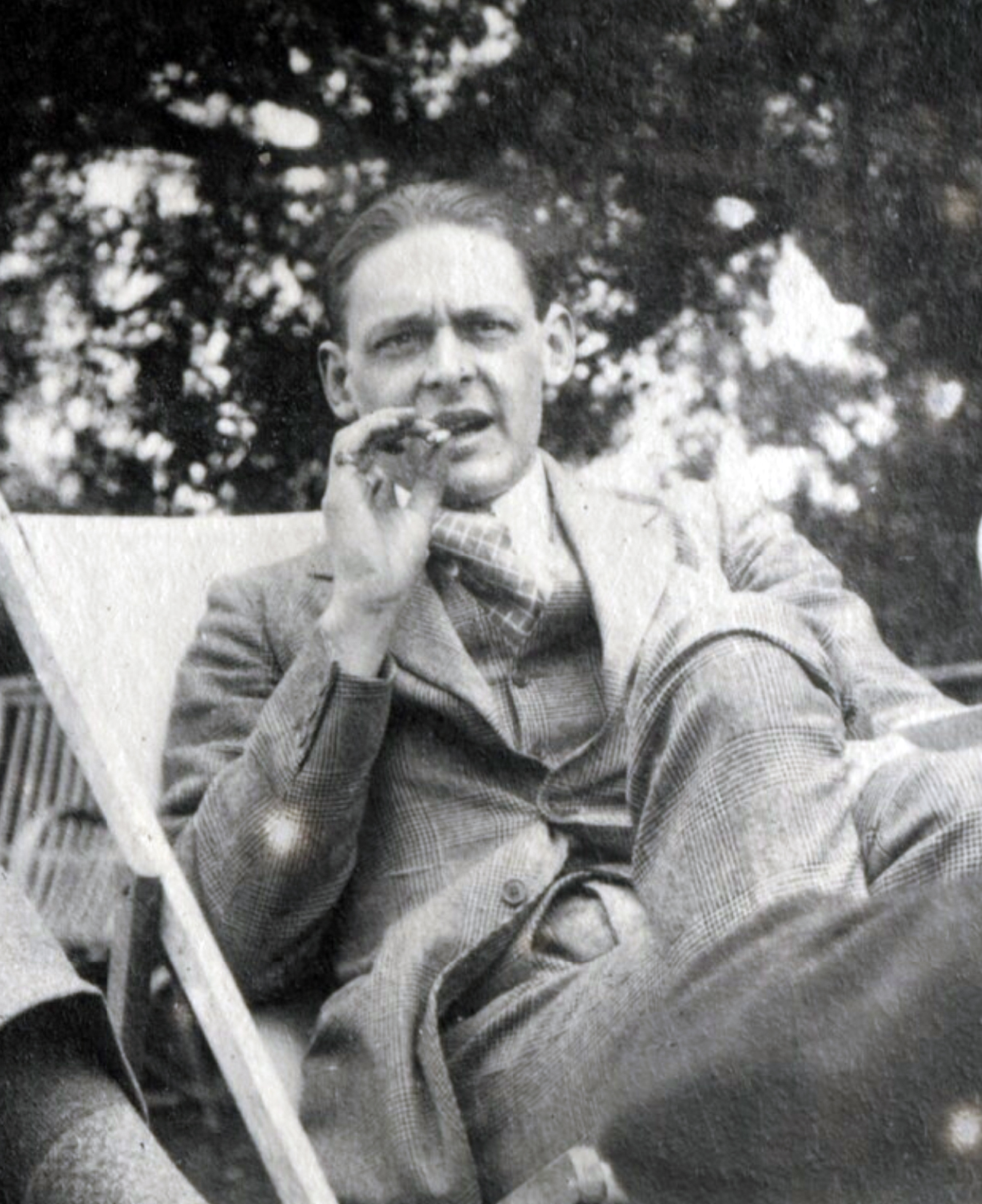
T. S. Eliot, 1923

When war was declared in August 1914, opportunities for writers were immediately reduced; poems were now expected to be patriotic. Pound's income from October 1914 to October 1915 was £42.10.0, apparently five times less than the year before.

On 22 September 1914 T. S. Eliot traveled from Merton College, Oxford, with an introduction from Conrad Aiken, to have Pound read Eliot's unpublished "The Love Song of J. Alfred Prufrock". Pound wrote to Harriet Monroe, editor of Poetry, on 30 September to say that Eliot—who was at Oxford on a fellowship from Harvard—had "sent in the best poem I have yet had or seen from an American ... He has actually trained himself and modernized himself on his own." Monroe did not like Prufrock's "very European world-weariness", according to Humphrey Carpenter, but she published it anyway, in June 1915.

The River Merchant's Wife:
A Letter

At fourteen I married My Lord you.
I never laughed, being bashful.
Lowering my head, I looked at the wall.
Called to, a thousand times, I never looked back.

At fifteen, I stopped scowling,
I desired my dust to be mingled with yours
Forever and forever and forever.
Why should I climb the look out?

— "The River Merchant's Wife: A Letter" by Li Bai, translated in Cathay (1915)

The 1915 book Cathay contains 25 examples of Classical Chinese poetry that Pound translated into English based on the notes of the Orientalist Ernest Fenollosa. Fenollosa's widow, Mary McNeill Fenollosa, had given Pound her husband's notes in 1913, after Laurence Binyon introduced them. Michael Alexander saw Cathay as the most attractive of Pound's work. There is a debate about whether the poems should be viewed primarily as translations or as contributions to Imagism and the modernization of English poetry. English professor Steven Yao argued that Cathay shows that translation does not need a thorough knowledge of the source language. (Note: Steven Yao does not view Pound's lack of Chinese as an obstacle, and states that the poet's trawl through centuries of scholarly interpretations resulted in a genuine understanding of the original poem. Chinese poet An Qi acknowledged a debt to Pound in her poem "Pound or the Rib of Poetry".)

Pound's translations from Old English, Latin, Italian, French and Chinese were highly disputed. According to Alexander, they made him more unpopular in some circles than the treason charge. Robert Graves wrote in 1955: "[Pound] knew little Latin, yet he translated Propertius; and less Greek, but he translated Alcaeus; and still less Anglo-Saxon, yet he translated The Seafarer. I once asked Arthur Waley how much Chinese Pound knew; Waley shook his head despondently."

Pound was devastated when Henri Gaudier-Brzeska, from whom he had commissioned a sculpture of himself two years earlier, was killed in the trenches in June 1915. In response, he published Gaudier-Brzeska: A Memoir (1916), writing "A great spirit has been among us, and a great artist has gone." Two months before he died, Gaudier-Brzeska had written to Pound to say that he kept Cathay in his pocket "to put courage in my fellows".

=== "Three Cantos", resignation from Poetry ===
After the publication of Cathay, Pound mentioned that he was working on a long poem. He described it in September 1915 as a "cryselephantine poem of immeasurable length which will occupy me for the next four decades unless it becomes a bore". In February 1916, when Pound was 30, the poet Carl Sandburg paid tribute to him in Poetry magazine. Pound "stains darkly and touches softly", he wrote:

Pound by E. O. Hoppé on the cover of Pavannes and Divisions (1918)

All talk on modern poetry, by people who know, ends with dragging in Ezra Pound somewhere. He may be named only to be cursed as wanton and mocker, poseur, trifler and vagrant. Or he may be classed as filling a niche today like that of Keats in a preceding epoch. The point is, he will be mentioned. ...

In the cool and purple meantime, Pound goes ahead producing new poems having the slogan, "Guts and Efficiency," emblazoned above his daily program of work. His genius runs to various schools and styles. He acquires traits and then throws them away. One characteristic is that he has no characteristics. He is a new roamer of the beautiful, a new fetcher of wild shapes, in each new handful of writings offered us.

In June, July and August 1917 Pound had the first three cantos published, as "Three Cantos", in Poetry. He was now a regular contributor to three literary magazines. From 1917 he wrote music reviews for the New Age as William Atheling and art reviews as B. H. Dias. In May 1917 Margaret Anderson hired him as foreign editor of The Little Review. He also wrote weekly pieces for The Egoist and The Little Review; many of the latter complained about provincialism, which included the ringing of church bells. (When Pound lived near St Mary Abbots he had "engaged in a fierce, guerrilla warfare of letters" about the bells with the vicar, Reverend R. E. Pennefather, according to Richard Aldington.) The volume of writing exhausted him. In 1918, after a bout of illness which was presumably the Spanish flu, he decided to stop writing for The Little Review. He had asked the publisher for a raise to hire a typist, the 23-year-old Iseult Gonne, causing rumors that they were having an affair, but he was turned down.

And the days are not full enough

And the days are not full enough
And the nights are not full enough
And life slips by like a field mouse
Not shaking the grass.

— Personae (1926)

A suspicion arose in June 1918 that Pound himself had written an article in The Egoist praising his own work, and it was clear from the response that he had acquired enemies. The poet F. S. Flint told The Egoist's editor that "we are all tired of Mr. Pound". British literary circles were "tired of his antics" and of him "puffing and swelling himself and his friends", Flint wrote. "His work has deteriorated from book to book; his manners have become more and more offensive; and we wish he would go back to America."

The March 1919 issue of Poetry published Pound's Poems from the Propertius Series, which appeared to be a translation of the Latin poet Sextus Propertius. (Note: In his next poetry collection in 1921, Pound renamed it Homage to Sextus Propertius in response to the criticism.) Harriet Monroe, editor of Poetry, published a letter in April 1919 from a professor of Latin, W. G. Hale, who found "about three-score errors" in the text; he said Pound was "incredibly ignorant of Latin", that "much of what he makes his author say is unintelligible", and that "If Mr. Pound were a professor of Latin, there would be nothing left for him but suicide" (adding "I do not counsel this"). Pound replied to Monroe: "Cat-piss and porcupines!! The thing is no more a translation than my 'Altaforte' is a translation, or than Fitzgerald's Omar is a translation." His letter ended "In final commiseration". Monroe interpreted his silence after that as his resignation from Poetry magazine.

=== Hugh Selwyn Mauberley ===
Hugh Selwyn Mauberley

Pound reading Mauberley, Washington, D.C., June 1958

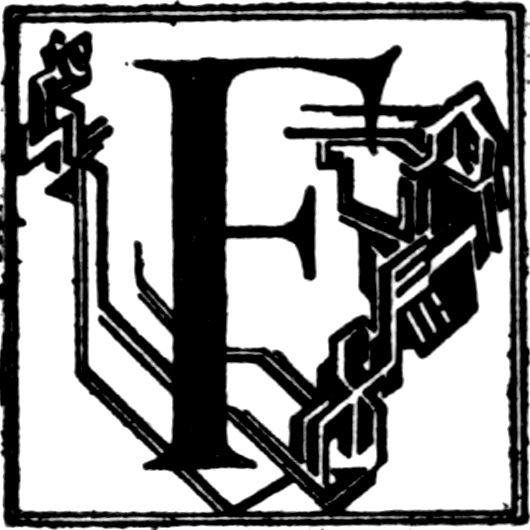

OR three years, out of key with his time,

He strove to resuscitate the dead art
Of poetry; to maintain "the sublime"
In the old sense. Wrong from the start—

No hardly, but, seeing he had been born
In a half savage country, out of date;
Bent resolutely on wringing lilies from the acorn;
Capaneus; trout for factitious bait;

Ἴδμεν γάρ τοι πάνθ', ὅσ' ἐνι Τροίῃ (Note: Homer, Odyssey 12.189: "For we know all that [happened] in Troy")
Caught in the unstopped ear;
Giving the rocks small lee-way
The chopped seas held him, therefore, that year.

— Hugh Selwyn Mauberley (1920)

By 1919 Pound felt there was no reason to stay in England. He had become "violently hostile" to England, according to Aldington, feeling he was being "frozen out of everything" except the New Age, and concluding that the British were insensitive to "mental agility in any and every form". He had "muffed his chances of becoming literary director of London—to which he undoubtedly aspired," Aldington wrote in 1941, "by his own enormous conceit, folly, and bad manners."

Published by John Rodker's The Ovid Press in June 1920, Pound's poem Hugh Selwyn Mauberley marked his farewell to London, and by December the Pounds were subletting their apartment and preparing to move to France. Consisting of 18 short parts, Mauberley describes a poet whose life has become sterile and meaningless. It begins with a satirical analysis of the London literary scene before turning to social criticism, economics, and the war. Here the word usury first appears in his work. Just as Eliot denied he was Prufrock, Pound denied he was Mauberley. In 1932 the critic F. R. Leavis, then director of studies in English at Downing College, Cambridge, called Mauberley "great poetry, at once traditional and original. Mr. Pound's standing as a poet rests on it, and rests securely".

On 13 January 1921 Orage wrote in the New Age: "Mr. Pound has shaken the dust of London from his feet with not too emphatic a gesture of disgust, but, at least, without gratitude to this country. ... [He] has been an exhilarating influence for culture in England; he has left his mark upon more than one of the arts, upon literature, music, poetry and sculpture; and quite a number of men and movements owe their initiation to his self-sacrificing stimulus ...".

With all this, however, Mr. Pound, like so many others who have striven for advancement of intelligence and culture in England, has made more enemies than friends, and far more powerful enemies than friends. Much of the Press has been deliberately closed by cabal to him; his books have for some time been ignored or written down; and he himself has been compelled to live on much less than would support a navvy. His fate, as I have said, is not unusual ... Taken by and large, England hates men of culture until they are dead. (Note: On 13 January 1921, shortly before or after he left for France, the New Age published a long statement of Pound's philosophy, which he called his Axiomata and which included: (1) The intimate essence of the universe is not of the same nature as our own consciousness. (2) Our own consciousness is incapable of having produced the universe. (3) God, therefore exists. That is to say, there is no reason for not applying the term God, Theos, to the intimate essence ...)

== Paris (1921–1924) ==
=== Meeting Hemingway, editing The Waste Land ===
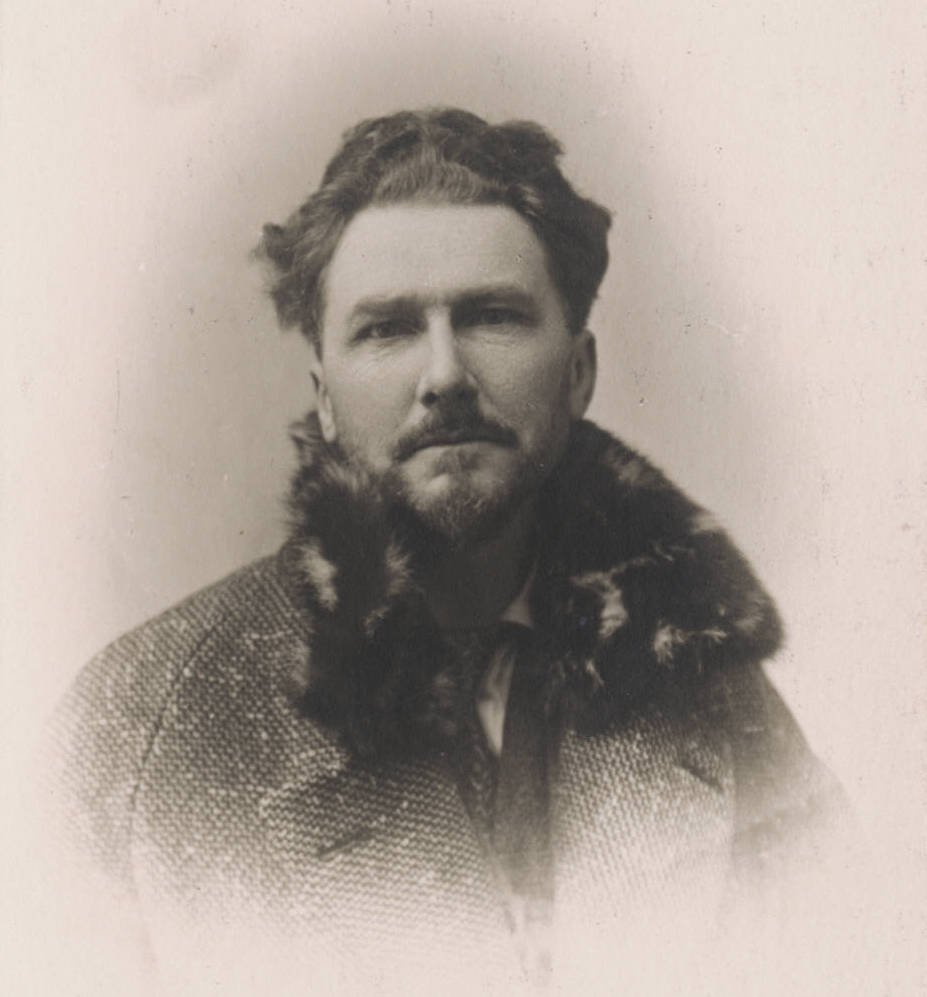
Pound's passport photograph, c. 1919

The Pounds settled in Paris around April 1921 and in December moved to an inexpensive ground-floor apartment at 70 bis Rue Notre-Dame-des-Champs. Pound became friendly with Marcel Duchamp, Fernand Léger, Tristan Tzara, and others of the Dada and Surrealist movements, as well as Basil Bunting. He was introduced to the American writer Gertrude Stein, who was living in Paris. She wrote years later that she liked him but did not find him amusing; he was "a village explainer, excellent if you were a village, but if you were not, not".

Pound's collection Poems 1918–1921 was published in New York by Boni and Liveright in 1921. In December that year Ernest Hemingway, then aged 22, moved to Paris with his wife, Hadley Richardson, carrying letters of introduction from Sherwood Anderson. In February 1922 the Hemingways visited the Pounds for tea. Although Pound was 14 years older, the men became friends; Hemingway assumed the status of pupil and asked Pound to edit his short stories. Pound introduced him to his contacts, including Lewis, Ford, John Peale Bishop, Malcolm Cowley, and Derek Patmore, while Hemingway tried to teach Pound to box. Unlike Hemingway, Pound was not a drinker and preferred to spend his time in salons or building furniture for his apartment and bookshelves for Sylvia Beach's Shakespeare and Company bookstore.

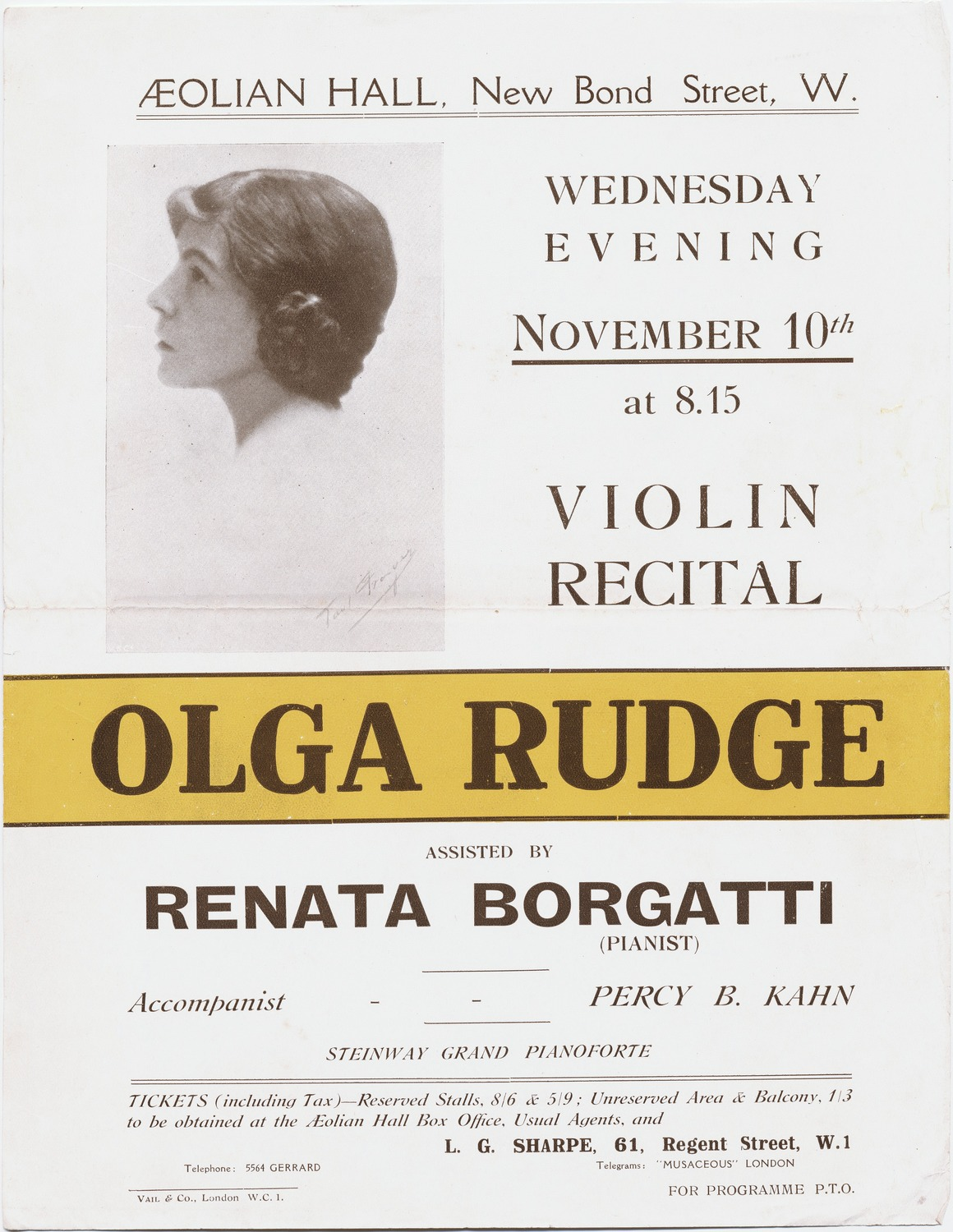
Olga Rudge, 1920

Eliot sent Pound the manuscript of The Waste Land in 1922. Pound edited it with comments like "make up yr. mind", and reduced it by about half. Eliot wrote in 1946: "I should like to think that the manuscript, with the suppressed passages, had disappeared irrecoverably; yet, on the other hand, I should wish the blue pencilling on it to be preserved as irrefutable evidence of Pound's critical genius." His dedication in The Waste Land was "For Ezra Pound / il miglior fabbro" (the "better craftsman"), from Canto 26 of Dante's Purgatorio.

=== Meeting Olga Rudge ===
Pound was 36 when he met the 26-year-old American violinist Olga Rudge in Paris in the summer of 1922. They were introduced at a salon hosted by the American heiress Natalie Barney at her 300-year-old house at 20 Rue Jacob, near the Boulevard Saint-Germain. The two moved in different social circles: Rudge was the daughter of a wealthy Youngstown, Ohio, steel family, living in her mother's Parisian apartment on the Right Bank, socializing with aristocrats, while Pound's friends were mostly impoverished writers of the Left Bank.

=== Restarting The Cantos ===
Twice the length of Paradise Lost and 50 times longer than The Waste Land, Pound's 800-page The Cantos ("Canto I" to "Canto CXVI", c. 1917–1962) became his life's work. (Note: For around 23,000 lines, 800 pages, and the comparison to Milton and Eliot, see Beach (2003), 32; for 116 sections, see Stoicheff (1995), 6 For the years: the first cantos were published in 1917, and the final complete canto was first published in 1962. Peter Stoicheff regards the 1968 Stone Wall/New Directions/Faber & Faber volume as the first authorized edition.) His obituary in The Times described it as not a great poem, because of the lack of structure, but a great improvisation: "[T]he exasperating form permits the occasional, and in the early Cantos and in The Pisan Cantos not so occasional, irruption of passages of great poetry, hot and burning lava breaking through the cracks in piles of boring scree."

Canto CXVI

I have brought the great ball of crystal;
Who can lift it?
Can you enter the great acorn of light?
But the beauty is not the madness
Tho' my errors and wrecks lie about me.
And I am not a demigod, (Note: Walter Baumann (Paideuma, 1983): "... Eva Hesse has informed us, presumably on Pound's authority, that the word 'demigod' alludes to the Heracles of Sophocles' Women of Trachis. The prominence Pound gave to the moment in the play when Heracles finally understands the full meaning of the oracles concerning him—that he is to be 'released from trouble,' not by a 'life of comfort,' but by death—is far more a revelation of his state of mind when making his version of the Trachiniae than of Sophocles' intentions, and the ad-libbing he allowed himself at the crucial point in the Sophoclean text is literally a shorthand anticipation of Canto 116: 'SPLENDOUR, / IT ALL COHERES'".)
I cannot make it cohere.

— The Paris Review, 1962 (Note: For the earliest version (with a line missing), Pound (1962), 14–16. For more on Canto 116, Baumann (1983). For the publication history of the final sections, Stoicheff (1986) and Stoicheff (1995). Also see Drafts and Fragments of Cantos CX–CXVII (1969).)

The first three cantos had been published in Poetry magazine in June, July, and August 1917, but in 1922 Pound abandoned most of his work and began again. The early cantos, the "Ur-Cantos", became "Canto I" of the new work. In letters to his father in 1924 and 1927, Pound said The Cantos was like the medley of voices you hear when you turn the radio dial, (Note: Richard Sieburth (Poetry, 1979): "As early as 1924, in a letter to his father, Pound was comparing his Cantos to the medley of voices produced by tuning a radio dial. The speakers did not need to be identified, he explained, for 'you can tell who is talking by the noise they make'—all the reader needed to do was listen attentively as one timbre cut into another, sometimes with clean edge, sometimes with a burst.") and "[r]ather like or unlike subject and response and counter subject in fugue":

A.A. Live man goes down into world of Dead.
C.B. The 'repeat in history'.
B.C. The 'magic moment' or moment of metamorphosis, bust thru from quotidien into 'divine or permanent world.' Gods., etc.

Alluding to American, European and Oriental art, history and literature, the work is also autobiographical. In the view of Pound scholar Carroll F. Terrell, it is a great religious poem, describing humanity's journey from hell to paradise, a "revelation of how divinity is manifested in the universe ... the kind of intelligence that makes the cherrystone become a cherry tree." The poet Allen Tate argued in 1949 that it is "about nothing at all ... a voice but no subject". Responding to A Draft of XXX Cantos (1930), F. R. Leavis criticized its "lack of form, grammar, principle and direction". The lack of form became a common criticism. (Note: George Kearns wrote that Pound's love of its production is what held the work together; in his view, Pound is speaking to the poem itself in a final fragment: "M'amour, m'amour".) Pound wrote in the final complete canto, "Canto CXVI" (116, first published in The Paris Review in 1962), that he could not "make it cohere", although a few lines later, referring to the universe: "it coheres all right / even if my notes do not cohere." According to Pound scholar Walter Baumann, the demigod of "Canto CXVI"—"And I am not a demigod"—is Heracles of Sophocles's Women of Trachis (450–425 BCE), who exclaims before he dies (based on Pound's translation): "SPLENDOUR, / IT ALL COHERES". "Canto CXVI" ends with the lines "a little light, like a rushlight / to lead back to splendour."

== Italy (1924–1939) ==
=== Birth of the children ===
The Pounds were unhappy in Paris. Dorothy complained about the winters and Ezra's health was poor. At one dinner in the Place de l'Odéon, a Surrealist guest high on drugs had tried to stab Pound in the back; Robert McAlmon had wrestled with the attacker, and the guests had managed to leave before the police arrived. For Pound the event underlined that their time in France was over. They decided to move to a quieter place, leaving in October 1924 for the seaside town of Rapallo in northern Italy. Hemingway wrote in a letter that Pound had "indulged in a small nervous breakdown" during the packing, leading to two days at the American Hospital of Paris in Neuilly. During this period the Pounds lived on Dorothy's income, supplemented by dividends from stock she had invested in.

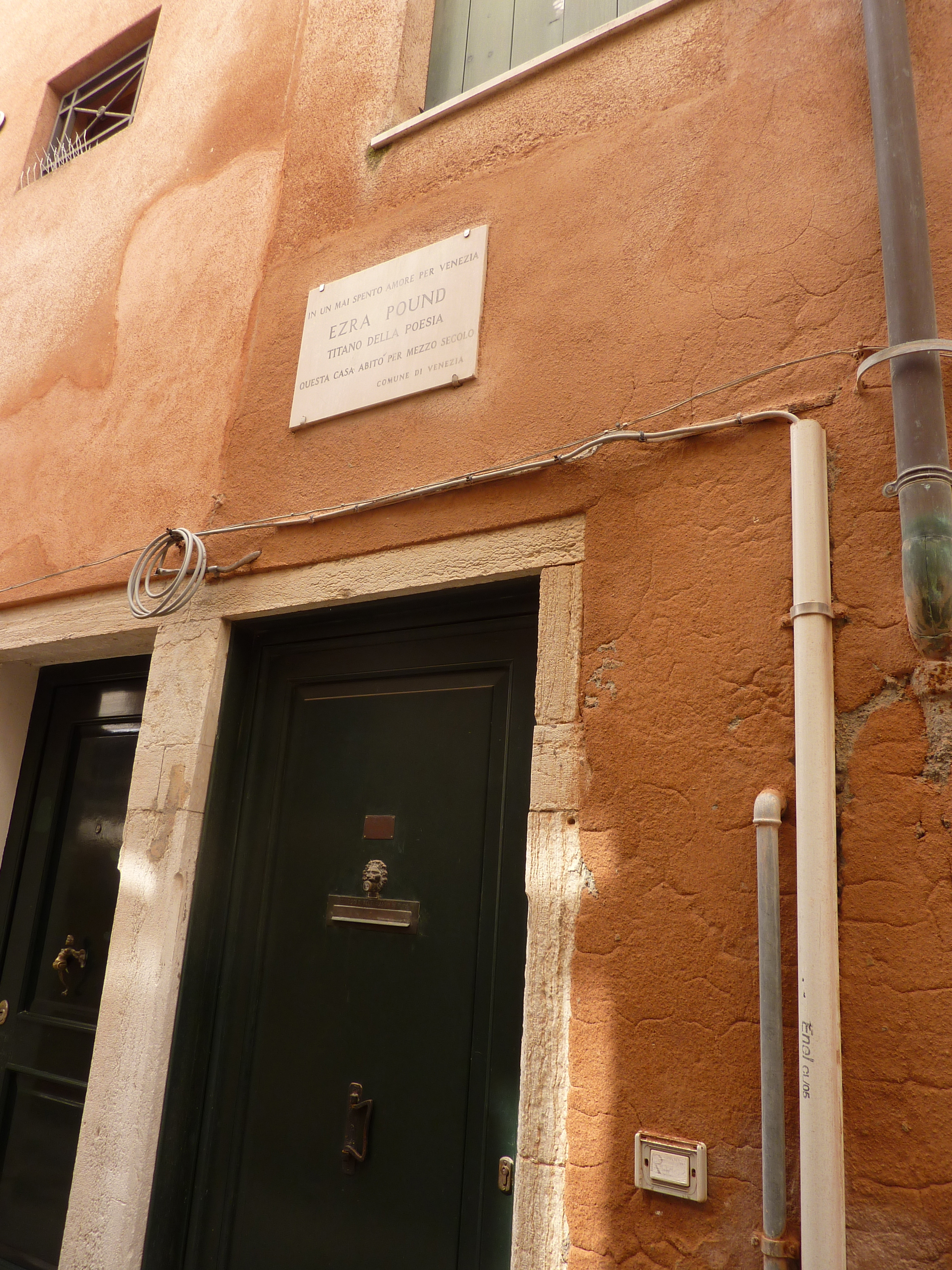
Olga Rudge's home in Venice, from 1928, at Calle Querini 252. The plaque can be translated as: Without ever stopping loving Venice, Ezra Pound, titan of poetry, lived in this house for half a century.

Pregnant by Pound, Olga Rudge followed the couple to Italy, and in July 1925 she gave birth to a daughter, Maria, in a hospital in Brixen (Italian: Bressanone). Rudge and Pound placed the baby with a German-speaking peasant woman in Gais, South Tyrol, whose own child had died and who agreed to raise Maria for 200 lire a month. Pound reportedly believed that artists ought not to have children, because in his view motherhood ruined women. According to Hadley Richardson, he took her aside before she and Hemingway left Paris for Toronto to have their child, telling her: "Well, I might as well say goodbye to you here and now because [the baby] is going to change you completely."

At the end of December 1925 Dorothy went on holiday to Egypt, returning on 1 March, and in May the Pounds and Olga Rudge left Rapallo for Paris to attend a semi-private concert performance at the Salle Pleyel of Le Testament de Villon, a one-act opera Pound had composed ("nearly tuneless", according to Carpenter) with the musicians Agnes Bedford and George Antheil. (Note: Richard Taruskin (2003): "Pound's musicking, like Wagner's, mainly took the form of idiosyncratic operas. The first, after Villon, was finished in 1923 and performed both in public and over the radio during Pound's lifetime. Two others, after Cavalcanti and Catullus, were planned and partly realized. But calling them operas was as idiosyncratic as everything else about them. They are medleys of poems tenuously connected by action, or by mere narration, based on events in the lives of the poets.") Pound had hired two singers for the performance; Rudge was on violin, Pound played percussion, and Joyce, Eliot and Hemingway were in the audience.

The couple stayed on in Paris after the performance; Dorothy was pregnant and wanted the baby to be born at the American hospital. Hemingway accompanied her there in a taxi for the birth of a son, Omar Pound, on 10 September 1926. (Ezra was an admirer of Fitzgerald's translation of Omar Khayyam.) Ezra signed the birth certificate the following day at Neuilly town hall and wrote to his father, "next generation (male) arrived. Both D & it appear to be doing well." Ezra ended up in the American hospital himself for tests and, he told Olga, a "small operation". Dorothy took Omar to England, where she stayed for a year and thereafter visited him every summer. He was sent to live at first in Felpham, Sussex, with a former superintendent of Norland College, which trains nannies, and later became a boarder at Charterhouse. When Dorothy was in England with Omar during the summers, Ezra would spend the time with Olga. Olga's father helped her buy a house in Venice in 1928, and from 1930 she also rented the top floor of a house in Sant'Ambrogio, Caso 60, near the Pounds in Rapallo.

=== The Exile, Dial poetry award ===
Pound in 1920 by E. O. Hoppe

In 1925 a new literary magazine, This Quarter, dedicated its first issue to Pound, including tributes from Hemingway and Joyce. In Hemingway's contribution, "Homage to Ezra", he wrote that Pound "devotes perhaps one fifth of his working time to writing poetry and in this twenty per cent of effort writes a large and distinguished share of the really great poetry that has been written by any American living or dead—or any Englishman living or dead or any Irishman who ever wrote English."

With the rest of his time he tries to advance the fortunes, both material and artistic, of his friends. He defends them when they are attacked, he gets them into magazines and out of jail. He loans them money. He sells their pictures. He arranges concerts for them. He writes articles about them. He introduces them to wealthy women. He gets publishers to take their books. He sits up all night with them when they claim to be dying and he witnesses their wills. He advances them hospital expenses and dissuades them from suicide. And in the end a few of them refrain from knifing him at the first opportunity.

Against Hemingway's positive view of Pound, Richard Aldington told Amy Lowell that year that Pound had been almost forgotten in England: "as the rest of us go up, he goes down", he wrote. In the U.S., Pound won the $2,000 Dial poetry award in 1927 for his translation of the Confucian classic Great Learning. Using the prize money, he launched his own literary magazine, The Exile, in March, but only four issues appeared. It did well in the first year, with contributions from Hemingway, E. E. Cummings, Basil Bunting, Yeats, William Carlos Williams, and Robert McAlmon. Some of the poorest work consisted of Pound's rambling editorials on Confucianism or in praise of Lenin, according to biographer J. J. Wilhelm. His parents visited him in Rapallo that year, seeing him for the first time since 1914. His father had retired, so they moved to Rapallo themselves, taking a small house, Villa Raggio, on a hill above the town.

=== Antisemitism, social credit ===
Pound's antisemitism can be traced to at least 1910, when he wrote in Patria Mia, his essays for the New Age: "The Jew alone can retain his detestable qualities, despite climatic conditions." The sentence was removed from the 1950 edition. In 1922, he apparently disliked that so many Jews were contributing to The Dial, and, in 1939, when he read his poetry at Harvard, he was said to have included antisemitic poems in the program because he believed there were Jews in the audience. (Note: In 1939, according to Samuel Putnam, Pound refused to enter Frances Steloff's Gotham Book Mart in New York because she was Jewish, even though she had helped to sell his work. Writing in 1947, Putnam said he heard this directly from Steloff. According to Carpenter, this did not happen. He says that Steloff called it "an absolute falsehood".)

A friend of Pound's, the writer Lina Caico, wrote to him in March 1937, asking him to use his musical contacts to help a German-Jewish pianist in Berlin who did not have enough money to live on because of the Nuremberg Laws. Normally willing to help fellow artists, Pound replied (at length): "You hit a nice sore spot ... Let her try Rothschild and some of the bastards who are murdering 10 million anglo saxons in England." He nevertheless denied being an antisemite; he said he liked Baruch Spinoza, Michel de Montaigne, and Alexander del Mar. "What I am driving at", he wrote to Jackson Mac Low, "is that some kike might manage to pin an antisem lable on me IF he neglected the mass of my writing." (Note: Beinecke Rare Book & Manuscript Library (2012): "Reading Pound's correspondence, researchers can delve in to his relationships with, and influence on, younger poets. Such is the case with Pound's letters to poet, composer, and performance artist Jackson Mac Low. In addition to discussing literature and politics, Pound defends himself from charges of anti-Semitism with the inflammatory remark that 'some kike might manage to pin an antisem lable on me IF he neglected the mass of my writing.'")

Pound came to believe that World War I had been caused by finance capitalism, which he called "usury", and that the Jews had been to blame. He believed the solution lay in C. H. Douglas's idea of social credit. Pound several times used the term Leihkapital (loan capital), equating it with Jews. Hitler had used the same term in Mein Kampf (1926). (Note: Mein Kampf was translated into English in full in 1939, but in 1931 Chatto & Windus published the book Hitler, by Pound's friend Wyndham Lewis, with translated fragments of Mein Kampf. Lewis later turned against fascism.) "Your enemy is Das Leihkapital," Pound wrote, in a 1942 radio script aimed at the UK, "international, wandering Loan Capital. Your enemy is not Germany, your enemy is money on loan. And it would be better to be infected with typhus ... than to be infected with this blindness which prevents you from understanding HOW you are undermined ... The big Jew is so bound up with this Leihkapital that no one is able to unscramble that omelet." The argument ran that without "usury" and Jews, there would be no class conflict.

In addition to presenting his economic ideas in hundreds of articles and in The Cantos, Pound wrote more than 1,000 letters a year throughout the 1930s. From 1932, he wrote 180 articles for The New English Weekly, a social-credit journal founded by A. R. Orage, and 60 for Il Mare, a Rapallo newspaper. He wrote to Bill Bird that the press in Paris was controlled by the Comité des forges. He also came under the influence of Charles Maurras, who led the far-right Action Française.

In 1935, Pound wrote an essay, "What is Money For?" where he advocated for Silvio Gesell's concept of free money. In the essay, he criticized usury and argued that "vegetable money" was necessary to put people whose livelihoods are dependent on producing food on an equal level playing field with people with already have plenty of money stored in banks.

=== Meeting Mussolini ===
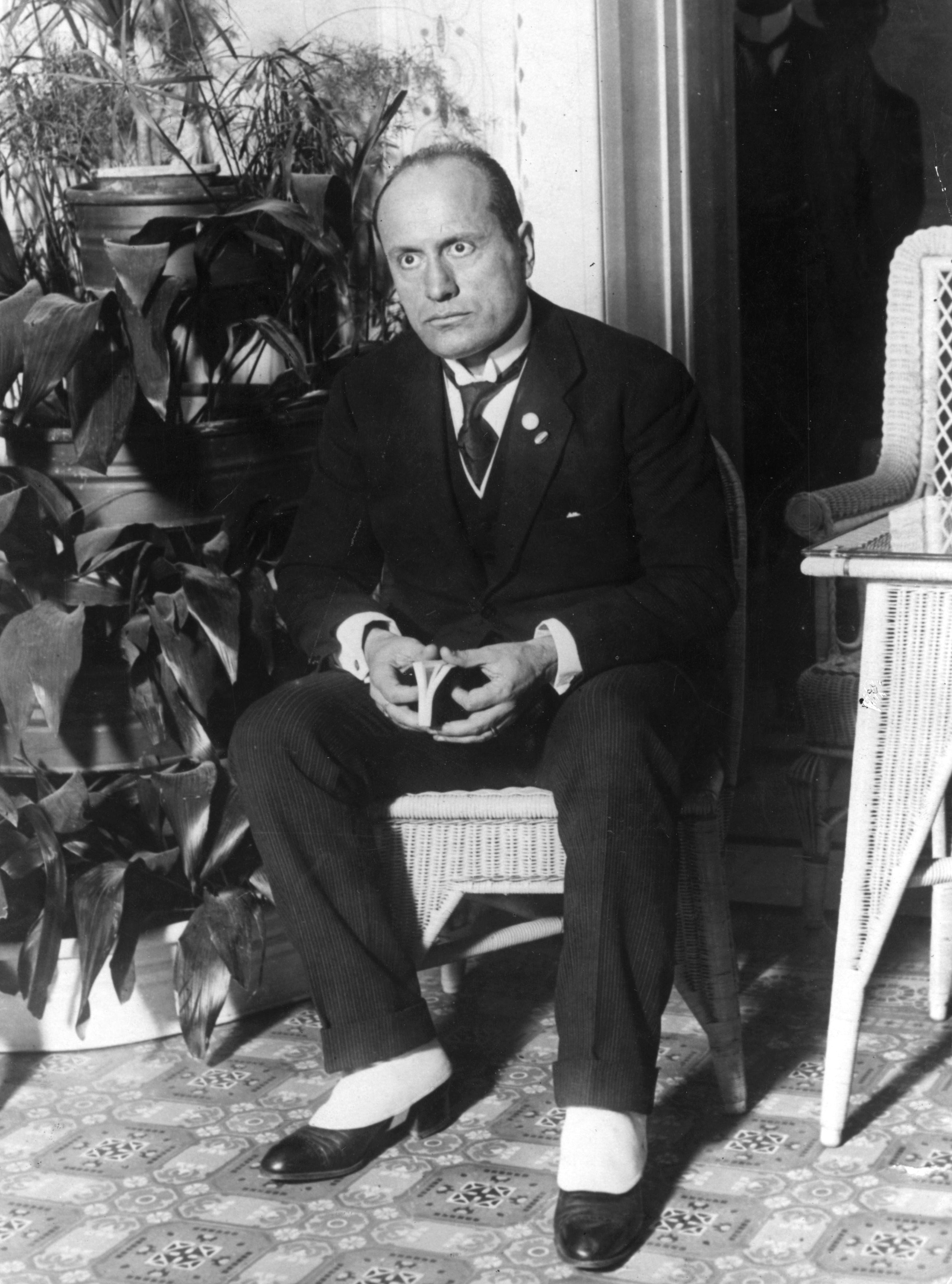
Benito Mussolini in 1922

In December 1932, Pound requested a meeting with Benito Mussolini after being hired to work on a film script about Italian fascism. Pound had asked to see Mussolini previously—Olga Rudge had played privately for Mussolini on 19 February 1927—but this time he was given an audience. They met on 30 January 1933 at the Palazzo Venezia in Rome, the day Adolf Hitler was appointed Chancellor of Germany.

When Pound handed Mussolini a copy of A Draft of XXX Cantos, Mussolini reportedly said of a passage Pound highlighted that it was not English. Pound said: "No, it's my idea of the way a continental Jew would speak English", to which Mussolini replied "How entertaining" (divertente). Pound tried to discuss an 18-point draft of his economic theories. (Daniel Swift writes that this story has been "told and retold, and in each version, the details shift".) Pound recorded the meeting in "Canto XLI".

Pound wrote to C. H. Douglas that he had "never met anyone who seemed to get my ideas so quickly as the boss". The meeting left him feeling that he had become a person of influence, Redman writes, someone who had been consulted by a head of state. When he returned to Rapallo, he was greeted at the station by the town band.

Canto XLI

A QVESTO,"
said the Boss, "è divertente."
catching the point before the aesthetes had got
there;
Having drained off the muck by Vada
From the marshes, by Circeo, where no one else wd. have
drained it.
Waited 2000 years, ate grain from the marshes:
Water supply for ten million, another one million "vani"
that is rooms for people to live in.
XI of our era.

— On meeting Mussolini

Immediately after the meeting, Pound began writing The ABC of Economics and Jefferson and/or Mussolini: L'Idea Statale Fascism as I Have Seen It (1935). The latter was ready by the end of February, although he had trouble finding a publisher. In 1942, Pound told Italy's Royal Finance Office that he had written the book for propaganda purposes in Italy's interests. He wrote articles praising Mussolini and fascism for T. S. Eliot's The Criterion in July 1933, the New York World Telegram in November 1933, the Chicago Tribune on 9 April 1934, and in 65 articles for the British-Italian Bulletin, published by the Italian Embassy in London.

Pound's antisemitism deepened with the introduction of the Italian racial laws in 1938, (Note: Tim Redman (2001): "Pound's antisemitism, which had been sporadically in evidence since the publication of 'Patria Mia' in 1912, grew in virulence with that of the Italian regime. With the passage of the racial laws in 1938, the onset of the Second World War in 1939, and the foundation of the Salo Republic, Pound's antisemitic outbursts grew in viciousness and frequency until the end of the war, when public awareness of the Holocaust forced a realization of the horrific consequences of hateful speech.") preceded by the publication in July that year of the Manifesto of Race. Mussolini instituted restrictions against Jews, who had to register. Foreign Jews lost their Italian citizenship, and on 18 September 1938 Mussolini declared Judaism "an irreconcilable enemy of fascism".

=== Visit to the United States ===
When Olivia Shakespear died in October 1938 in London, Dorothy asked Ezra to organize the funeral, where he saw their 12-year-old son, Omar, for the first time in eight years. He visited Eliot and Wyndham Lewis, who produced a famous portrait of Pound reclining.

Believing he could stop America's involvement in World War II, Pound sailed for New York in April 1939 on the SS Rex in a first-class suite. (Note: Tytell writes that the suite was said to have been paid for by the Italian government, but Carpenter writes that Pound had simply decided to travel in style.) Giving interviews on the deck in a tweed jacket, he told reporters that Mussolini wanted peace. In Washington, D.C., he attended a session of Congress, sitting in a section of the gallery reserved for relatives (because of Thaddeus Coleman Pound). He lobbied senators and congressmen, had lunch with the Polish ambassador, warning him not to trust the English or Winston Churchill, and asked to see the President but was told it could not be done.

He took part in a poetry reading at Harvard, where he agreed to be recorded by the Department of Speech, and in July he received an honorary doctorate from Hamilton College, along with the radio commentator H. V. Kaltenborn. Kaltenborn, whom Pound referred to at the time as Kaltenstein, gave an anti-fascist speech after lunch ("dictatorships shall die, but democracies shall live"), which Pound interrupted loudly to the point where, according to one account, the college president had to intervene. Pound described this years later to Wyndham Lewis: "That was a music hall day, with a stage set/ only at a Kawledg Komencement wd/ one git in mouth-shot at that sort of wind-bag/ that fahrt Kaltenbourne." (Note: William Carlos Williams, his friend since university, wrote to Pound's publisher, James Laughlin, in June 1939: "The man is sunk, in my opinion, unless he can shake the fog of fascism out of his brain ...".) Pound sailed back to Italy a few days later on the SS Conte di Savoia.

Between May and September 1939 Pound wrote 12 articles for the Japan Times (he became their "Italian correspondent"), which included the claim that "Democracy is now currently defined in Europe as a 'country run by Jews'". He discussed the "essential fairness of Hitler's war aims" and wrote that Churchill was a senile front for the Rothschilds.

== World War II and fascist radio broadcasts (1939–1945) ==
=== Letter-writing campaign ===
When war broke out in September 1939, Pound began a letter-writing campaign to the politicians he had petitioned months earlier. On 18 June 1940, after the fall of France, he wrote to Senator Burton K. Wheeler: "I have read a regulation that only those foreigners are to be admitted to the U.S. who are deemed to be useful etc/. The dirtiest jews from Paris, Blum??" He explained that they were all a pox. To his publisher, James Laughlin, he wrote that "Roosevelt represents Jewry" and signed off with "Heil Hitler". He began calling Roosevelt "Jewsfeldt" or "Stinky Roosenstein". In Meridiano di Roma he compared Hitler and Mussolini to Confucius. In Oswald Mosley's newspaper, Action, he wrote that the English were "a slave race governed by the House of Rothschild since Waterloo". By May 1940, according to the historian Matthew Feldman, the British government regarded Pound as "a principal supplier of information to the BUF [British Union of Fascists] from abroad". His literary agent in New York, John J. Slocum, urged him to return to writing poetry and literary criticism; instead, Pound sent Slocum political manifestos, which he declined to attempt to publish in the United States.

=== Radio broadcasts ===
Radio broadcast

You let in the Jew and the Jew rotted your Empire, and you yourselves are (doomed) by the Jew.

— Ezra Pound, Radio Rome, 15 March 1942

Between 23 January 1941 and 28 March 1945, including during the Holocaust in Italy, Pound recorded or composed hundreds of broadcasts for Italian radio, mostly for EIAR (Radio Rome) and later for a radio station in the Italian Social Republic, a puppet state of Nazi Germany in northern and central Italy. Broadcast in English, and sometimes in Italian, German, and French, the EIAR program was transmitted to England, central Europe, and the United States.

Styling himself "Dr Ezra Pound" (his only doctorate was the honorary one from Hamilton College), he attacked the United States, Roosevelt, Roosevelt's family, Churchill, and the Jews. He praised Hitler, recommended eugenics to "conserve the best of the race", and referred to Jews as "filth". The broadcasts were monitored by the United States Foreign Broadcast Monitoring Service, and on 26 July 1943 the United States District Court for the District of Columbia indicted Pound in absentia for treason. According to Feldman, the Pound archives at Yale contain receipts for 195 payments from the Italian Ministry of Popular Culture from 22 April 1941 to 26 January 1944. Over 33 months, Pound received 250,000 lire (then equivalent to $12,500; $185,000 as of 2013).

Italian Social Republic, September 1943 – May 1945

On 9–10 September 1943, the German Wehrmacht occupied northern and central Italy. Hitler appointed Mussolini head of a fascist puppet state, the Italian Social Republic or Salò Republic. Pound called it the "Republic of Utopia". SS officers began concentrating Jews in transit camps before deporting them to Auschwitz-Birkenau. In Rome when the German occupation began, Pound headed north to Gais, on foot and by train, to visit his daughter, a journey of about 450 miles (720 km). (Note: According to his daughter, it was during this visit that Pound first told her he had a wife in Rapallo and a son in England.) On or around 23 November 1943, he met Fernando Mezzasoma, the new Minister of Popular Culture, in Salò. Pound wrote to Dorothy from Salò asking if she could obtain a radio confiscated from the Jews to give to Rudge, so that Rudge could help with his work.

From 1 December 1943 Pound began writing scripts for the state's new radio station. The following day he suggested to Alessandro Pavolini, secretary of the Republican Fascist Party, that book stores be legally obliged to showcase certain books, including The Protocols of the Elders of Zion (1903), an Okhrana hoax document purporting to be a Jewish plan to dominate the world. "The arrest of Jews will create a wave of useless mercy," Pound wrote, "thus the need to disseminate the Protocols. The intellectuals are capable of a passion more durable than emotional, but they need to understand the reasons for a conflict." On 26 January 1945, in a script called "Corpses of Course" for the program Jerry's Front Calling, Pound wrote: "Why shouldn't there be one grand beano; wiping out Sieff and Kuhn and Loeb and Guggenheim and Stinkenfinger and the rest of the nazal bleaters?"

=== Arrest for treason ===
In May 1944 the German military, trying to secure the coast against the Allies, forced the Pounds to evacuate their seafront apartment in Rapallo. From then until the end of the war, the couple lived with Rudge in her home above Rapallo at Sant' Ambrogio. There were food shortages, and no coffee, newspapers, telephones, or letters. According to Rudge, Ezra and Dorothy would spend their nights listening to the BBC. In addition to the radio scripts, Pound was writing for the newspaper Il Popolo di Alessandria. He wanted to write for the more reputable Corriere della Sera in Milan, but the editor regarded his Italian as "incomprehensible".

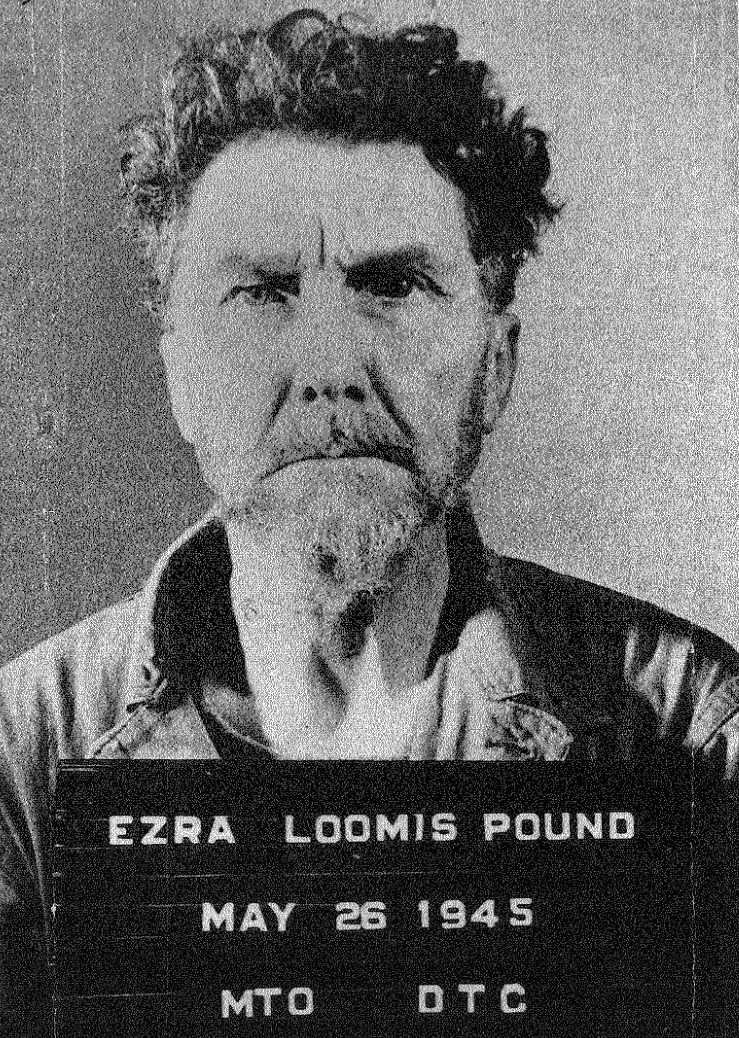
Taken at the Disciplinary Training Center

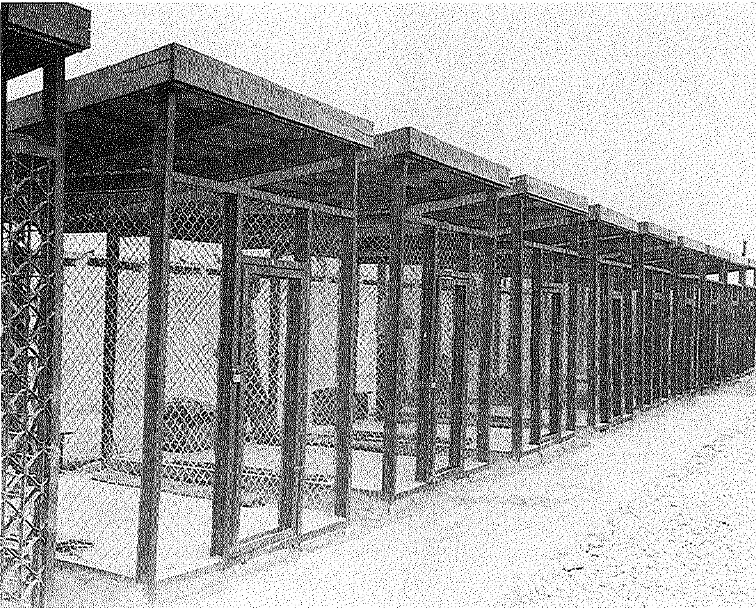
Pound spent three weeks in the reinforced cage on the far left.

Mussolini and his mistress, Clara Petacci, were shot by Italian partisans on 28 April 1945. Their bodies were displayed in the Piazzale Loreto in Milan, abused by the crowd, then left hanging upside down. Pound wrote in "Canto LXXIV" (The Pisan Cantos), "Thus Ben and la Clara a Milano / by the heels at Milano". On 3 May armed partisans arrived at Rudge's home to find Pound alone. He picked up the Confucian text Four Books and a Chinese–English dictionary and was taken to their headquarters in Zoagli, then at his request to the U.S. Counter Intelligence Corps headquarters in Genoa, where he was interrogated by FBI agent Frank L. Amprin.

Pound asked to send a cable to Harry S. Truman to help negotiate a "just peace" with Japan. He wanted to make a final broadcast called "Ashes of Europe Calling", in which he would recommend not only peace with Japan, but American management of Italy, the establishment of a Jewish state in Palestine, and leniency toward Germany. His requests were denied and the script was forwarded to J. Edgar Hoover. A few days later Amprin removed over 7,000 letters, articles and other documents from Rudge's home as evidence. On 8 May, the day Germany surrendered, Pound gave the Americans a further statement:

Toilet paper showing start of Canto LXXIV

I am not anti-Semitic, and I distinguish between the Jewish usurer and the Jew who does an honest day's work for a living.

Hitler and Mussolini were simple men from the country. I think that Hitler was a Saint, and wanted nothing for himself. I think that he was fooled into anti-Semitism and it ruined him. That was his mistake. When you see the "mess" that Italy gets into by bumping off Mussolini, you will see why someone could believe in some of his efforts.

Later that day he told an American reporter, Edd Johnson, that Hitler was "a Jeanne d'Arc ... Like many martyrs, he held extreme views". Mussolini was "a very human, imperfect character who lost his head". On 24 May he was transferred to the United States Army Disciplinary Training Center north of Pisa, where he was placed in one of the camp's 6-by-6-foot (1.8 by 1.8 m) outdoor steel cages, with tar paper covers, lit up at night by floodlights. Engineers reinforced his cage the night before he arrived in fear that fascist sympathizers might try to break him out.

Pound lived in isolation in the heat, sleeping on the concrete, denied exercise and communication, apart from daily access to the chaplain. After three weeks, he stopped eating. He recorded what seemed to be a breakdown in "Canto LXXX", where Odysseus is saved from drowning by Leucothea: "hast'ou swum in a sea of air strip / through an aeon of nothingness, / when the raft broke and the waters went over me". Medical staff moved him out of the cage the following week. On 14 and 15 June he was examined by psychiatrists, after which he was transferred to his own tent. He began to write, drafting what became known as The Pisan Cantos. The existence of two sheets of toilet paper showing the first ten lines of "Canto LXXIV" in pencil suggests he started it while in the cage.

== United States (1945–1958) ==
=== St. Elizabeths Hospital ===
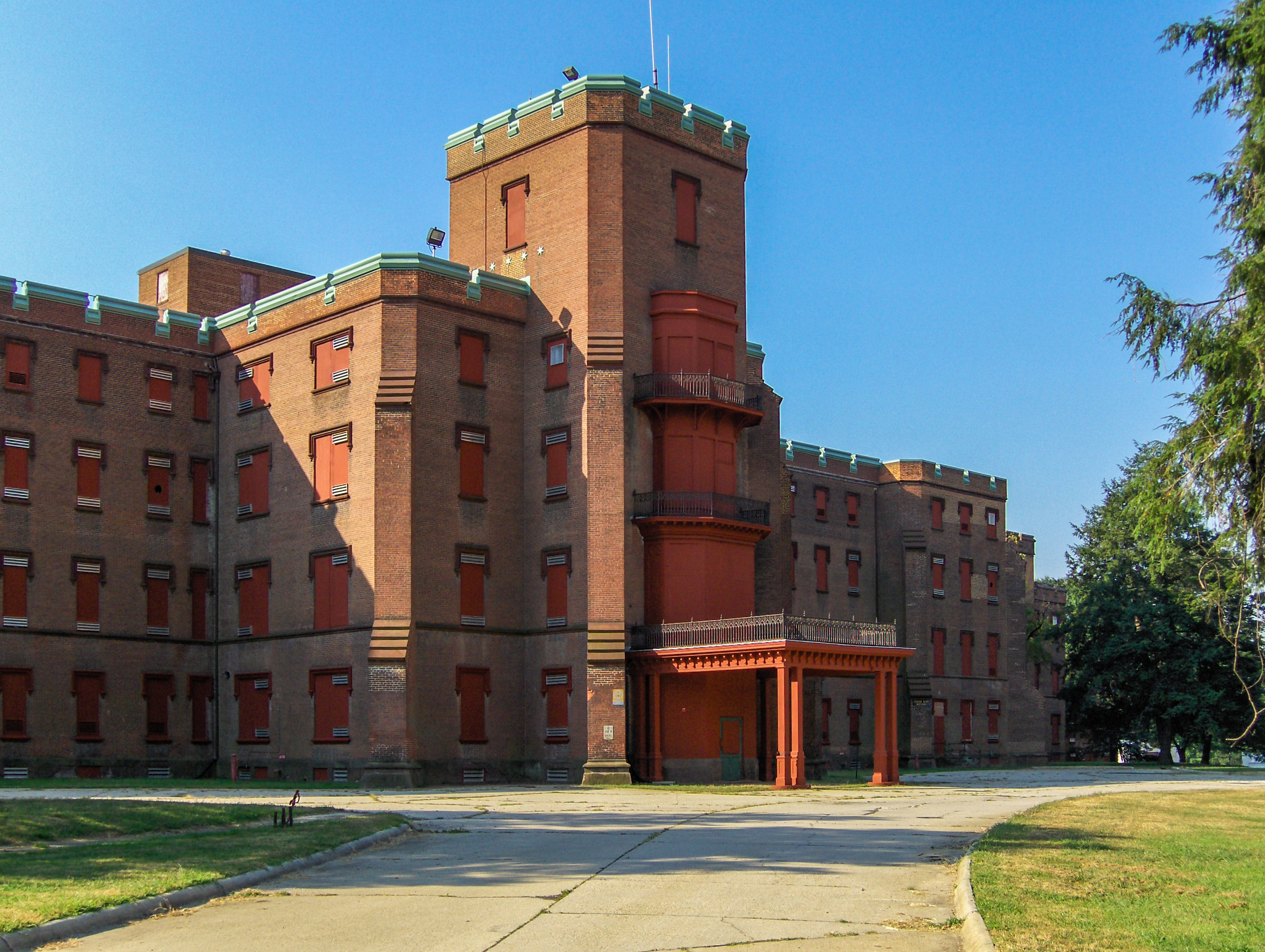
St. Elizabeths Hospital Center Building, Anacostia, Washington, D.C., 2006

Pound arrived back in Washington, D.C., on 18 November 1945, two days before the start of the Nuremberg trials. Lt. Col. P. V. Holder, one of the escorting officers, wrote in an affidavit that Pound was "an intellectual 'crackpot'" who intended to conduct his own defense. Dorothy would not allow it; Pound wrote in a letter: "Tell Omar I favour a defender who has written a life of J. Adams and translated Confucius. Otherwise how CAN he know what it is about?".

He was arraigned on 27 November on charges of treason, (Note: The 19 counts consisted of broadcasts that had been witnessed by two technicians; the charge was that Pound had violated his allegiance to the United States by unlawfully supporting the Kingdom of Italy.) and on 4 December he was placed in a locked room in the psychiatric ward of Gallinger Hospital. Three court-appointed psychiatrists, including Winfred Overholser, superintendent of St. Elizabeths Hospital, decided that he was mentally unfit to stand trial. They found him "abnormally grandiose ... expansive and exuberant in manner, exhibiting pressure of speech, discursiveness and distractibility." A fourth psychiatrist appointed by Pound's lawyer initially thought he was a psychopath, which would have made him unfit to stand trial.

On 21 December 1945, as case no. 58,102, he was transferred to Howard Hall, St. Elizabeths' maximum security ward, where he was held in a single cell with peepholes. Visitors were admitted to the waiting room for 15 minutes at a time, while patients wandered around screaming. A hearing on 13 February 1946 concluded that he was of "unsound mind"; he shouted in court: "I never did believe in Fascism, God damn it; I am opposed to Fascism." Pound's lawyer, Julien Cornell, requested his release at a hearing in January 1947. As a compromise, Overholser moved him to the more comfortable Cedar Ward on the third floor of the east wing of St. Elizabeths' Center Building. In early 1948 he was moved again, this time to a larger room in Chestnut Ward.

John Tytell writes that Pound was in his element in Chestnut Ward. At last provided for, he was allowed to read, write, and receive visitors, including Dorothy for several hours a day. (In October 1946 Dorothy had been placed in charge of his "person and property".) His room had a typewriter, floor-to-ceiling book shelves, and bits of paper hanging on string from the ceiling with ideas for The Cantos. He had turned a small alcove on the ward into his living room, where he entertained friends and literary figures. (Note: Visitors included Conrad Aiken, Elizabeth Bishop, E. E. Cummings, Guy Davenport, T. S. Eliot, Achilles Fang, Edith Hamilton, Hugh Kenner, Robert Lowell, Archibald MacLeish, Marshall McLuhan, H. L. Mencken, Marianne Moore, Norman Holmes Pearson, Allen Tate, Stephen Spender, and William Carlos Williams. Another person who visited Pound on occasion and regularly corresponded with him was Elisabeth W. Schneider, a literature professor at Temple University; their correspondence is in the collection of the University of California, Santa Barbara, library.) It reached the point where he refused to discuss any attempt to have him released.

While in St. Elizabeths, Pound would often decline to talk to psychiatrists with names he deemed Jewish (he called psychiatrists "kikiatrists"), and he apparently told Charles Olson: "I was a Zionist in Italy, but now I'm for pogroms, after what I've experienced in here (SLiz)." He advised visitors to read the Protocols of the Elders of Zion, and he referred to any visitor he happened not to like as Jewish. In November 1953 he wrote to Olivia Rossetti Agresti that Hitler was "bit by dirty Jew mania for World Domination, as yu used to point out/ this WORST of German diseases was got from yr/ idiolized and filthy biblical bastards. Adolf clear on the baccilus of kikism/ that is on nearly all the other poisons.[sic] but failed to get a vaccine against that."

=== The Pisan Cantos, Bollingen Prize ===
Canto LXXX

and the Serpentine will look just the same
and the gulls be as neat on the pond
and the sunken garden unchanged
and God knows what else is left of our London

— The Pisan Cantos (1948)

James Laughlin of New Directions had Cantos LXXIV–LXXXIV, known as The Pisan Cantos, ready for publication in 1946 and gave Pound an advance copy, but Laughlin held back, waiting for the right time to publish. A group of Pound's friends—T. S. Eliot, E. E. Cummings, W. H. Auden, Allen Tate, and Joseph Cornell—met Laughlin in June 1948 to discuss how to get Pound released. They planned to have him awarded the first Bollingen Prize, a new national poetry award with $1,000 prize money donated by the Mellon family.

The awards committee consisted of 15 fellows of the Library of Congress, including several of Pound's supporters, such as Eliot, Tate, Conrad Aiken, Katherine Anne Porter, and Theodore Spencer. (Note: The Associated Press reported the list of judges as Conrad Aiken, W. H. Auden, Louise Bogan, Katherine Garrison Chapin, T. S. Eliot, Paul Green, Robert Lowell, Katherine Anne Porter, Karl Shapiro, Allen Tate, Willard Thorp, and Robert Penn Warren. Also on the list were Léonie Adams, the Library of Congress's poetry consultant, and Theodore Spencer, who died on 18 January 1949, just before the award was announced.) The idea was that the Justice Department would be in an untenable position if Pound won a major award and was not released. Laughlin published The Pisan Cantos on 20 July 1948, and the following February the prize went to Pound. (Note: "At their [the committee's first] meeting [in November 1948], and to no one's great surprise, given [Allen] Tate's behind-the-scenes maneuverings and the intimidating presence of recent Nobel Laureate T. S. Eliot, The Pisan Cantos emerged as the major contender ...") There were two dissenting voices, Katherine Garrison Chapin and Karl Shapiro; the latter said he could not vote for an antisemite because he was Jewish himself. Pound had apparently prepared a statement—"No comment from the Bug House"—but decided instead to stay silent.

There was uproar. The Pittsburgh Post-Gazette quoted critics who said that poetry cannot "convert words into maggots that eat at human dignity and still be good poetry". Robert Hillyer, a Pulitzer Prize winner and president of the Poetry Society of America, attacked the committee in The Saturday Review of Literature, telling journalists that he "never saw anything to admire, not one line, in Pound". Congressman Jacob K. Javits demanded an investigation into the awards committee. It was the last time the Library of Congress administered the prize.

=== Diagnosis ===
During a case conference at St. Elizabeths on 28 January 1946, six psychiatrists had concluded that Pound had psychopathic personality disorder but was not psychotic. Present during the meeting, he decided to lie on the floor while the psychiatrists interviewed him. In 1952 the American Psychiatric Association published its first Diagnostic and Statistical Manual of Mental Disorders (DSM-1), and St. Elizabeths began diagnosing patients according to its definitions. In July 1953 a psychiatrist added to Pound's notes that he probably had narcissistic personality disorder. The main feature of Pound's personality, he wrote, was his "profound, incredible, over-weaning (sic) narcissism". A personality disorder, unlike conditions that give rise to psychosis, is not regarded as a mental illness, and the diagnosis would have made Pound fit to stand trial. On 31 May 1955, at the request of the hospital's superintendent Winfred Overholser, the diagnosis was changed to "psychotic disorder, undifferentiated", which is classified as mental illness. In 1966, after his release from St. Elizabeths, Pound was diagnosed with bipolar disorder.

=== Political activities while hospitalized ===
Pound struck up a friendship with Eustace Mullins, apparently associated with the Aryan League of America and author of the 1961 biography This Difficult Individual, Ezra Pound. He was also visited in the hospital by American Nazi leader Matt Koehl, and befriended John Kasper, a Ku Klux Klan member who, after Brown v. Board of Education (a 1954 U.S. Supreme Court decision mandating racial desegregation in public schools), set up a Citizens' Council chapter, the Seaboard White Citizens' Council in Washington. Members had to be white, supportive of racial segregation, and believers in the divinity of Jesus. Kasper wrote to Pound after admiring him at university, and the two became friends. In 1953 Kasper opened a far-right bookstore, "Make it New", at 169 Bleecker Street, Greenwich Village, that displayed Pound's work in the window. With Pound's cooperation, he and another Pound admirer, T. David Horton, set up Square Dollar Series, a publishing imprint that reprinted Pound's books and others he approved of.

It became increasingly clear that Pound was schooling Kasper in the latter's pro-segregation activism. In January and February 1957 the New York Herald Tribune ran a series of articles on their relationship, after which the FBI began photographing Pound's visitors. One article alleged that some of Kasper's pamphlets had, as John Tytell put it, "a distinctly Poundian ring" to them. (Note: For example, one flier was modeled on the 1914 Blast manifesto: "JAIL NAACP, alien, unclean, unchristian / BLAST irrelevant ungodly LEADERS".) Kasper was jailed in 1956 over a speech he made in Clinton, Tennessee, and he was questioned about the 1957 bombing of the Hattie Cotton School in Nashville. After Pound left hospital in 1958, the men kept in touch; he wrote to Kasper on 17 April 1959: "Antisemitism is a card in the enemy program, don't play it. ... They RELY ON YOUR PLAYING IT."

=== New Times articles ===
Between late 1955 and early 1957, Pound wrote at least 80 unsigned or pseudonymous articles—"often ugly", Swift notes—for the New Times of Melbourne, a newspaper connected to the social-credit movement. Noel Stock, one of Pound's correspondents and early biographers, worked for the paper and published Pound's articles there. A 24-year-old radio reporter at the time, Stock first wrote to Pound in hospital after reading The Pisan Cantos.

In the New Times in April 1956, Pound wrote: "Our Victorian forebears would have been greatly scandalized at the idea that one might not be free to study inherited racial characteristics", and "Some races are retentive, mainly of the least desirable bits of their barbaric past." There was a "Jewish-Communist plot", which he compared to syphilis. Equality was dismissed as "anti-biological nonsense". "There were no gas ovens in Italy", he wrote in April 1956; a month later he referred to the "fuss about Hitler". On 10 August 1956: "It is perfectly well known that the fuss about 'de-segregation' in the United States has been started by Jews." Instead, America needed "race pride". Using pseudonyms, he sent his articles directly to Stock, so that the newspaper's editor may not have realized they had all been written by Pound. Stock sent Pound copies of the published articles, which he would distribute to his followers. He contributed similar material to other publications, including Edge, which Stock founded in October 1956. Stock called Edge the magazine of the "international Poundian underground".

=== Release ===
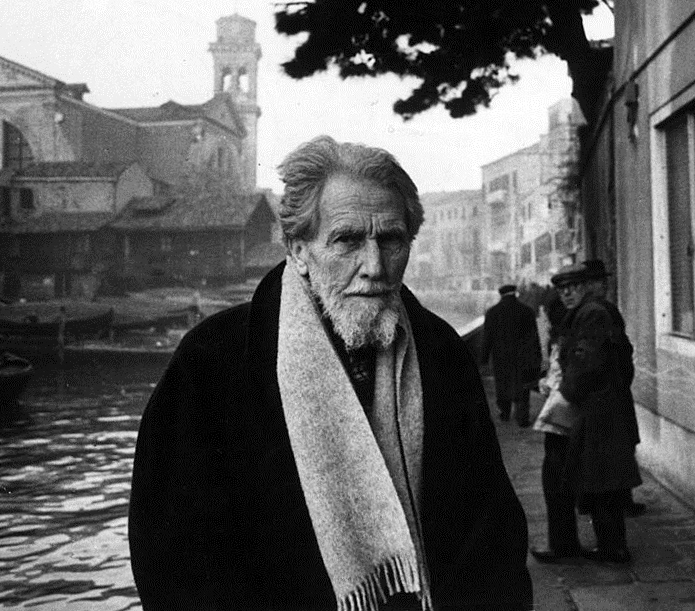
Pound photographed on a walk in Venice, 1963

Pound's friends continued to try to get him out of St. Elizabeths. In 1948, in an effort to present his radio broadcasts as harmless, Olga Rudge self-published six of them (on cultural topics only) as If This Be Treason. She visited him twice, in 1952 and 1955, but could not convince him to be more assertive about his release. In 1950 she had written to Hemingway to complain that Pound's friends had not done enough. Hemingway and Rudge did not like each other. He told Dorothy in 1951 that "the person who makes least sense ... in all this is Olga Rudge". In what John Cohassey called a "controlled, teeth-gritting response", Hemingway replied to Rudge that he would pardon Pound if he could, but that Pound had "made the rather serious mistake of being a traitor to his country, and temporarily he must lie in the bed he made". He ended by saying "To be even more blunt, I have always loved Dorothy, and still do."

Four years later, shortly after he won the Nobel Prize in Literature in 1954, Hemingway told Time magazine "I believe this would be a good year to release poets." The poet Archibald MacLeish asked him in June 1957 to write a letter on Pound's behalf. Hemingway believed Pound would not stop making inappropriate statements and friendships, but he signed MacLeish's letter anyway and pledged $1,500 to be handed to Pound upon his release. In an interview for The Paris Review in early 1958, Hemingway said that Pound should be released and Kasper jailed.

Several publications began campaigning in 1957. The French newspaper Le Figaro published an appeal titled "The Lunatic at St Elizabeths". The New Republic, Esquire, and The Nation followed suit. The Nation argued that Pound was a "sick and vicious old man", but that he had rights. In 1958 MacLeish hired Thurman Arnold, a prestigious lawyer who ended up charging no fee, to file a motion to dismiss the 1945 indictment. Overholser, the hospital's superintendent, supported the application with an affidavit stating Pound was permanently and incurably insane, and that confinement served no therapeutic purpose. The motion was heard on 18 April 1958 by Chief Judge Bolitha Laws, who had committed Pound to St. Elizabeths in 1945. The Justice Department did not oppose the motion, and Pound was discharged on 7 May.

== Italy (1958–1972) ==
=== Depression ===
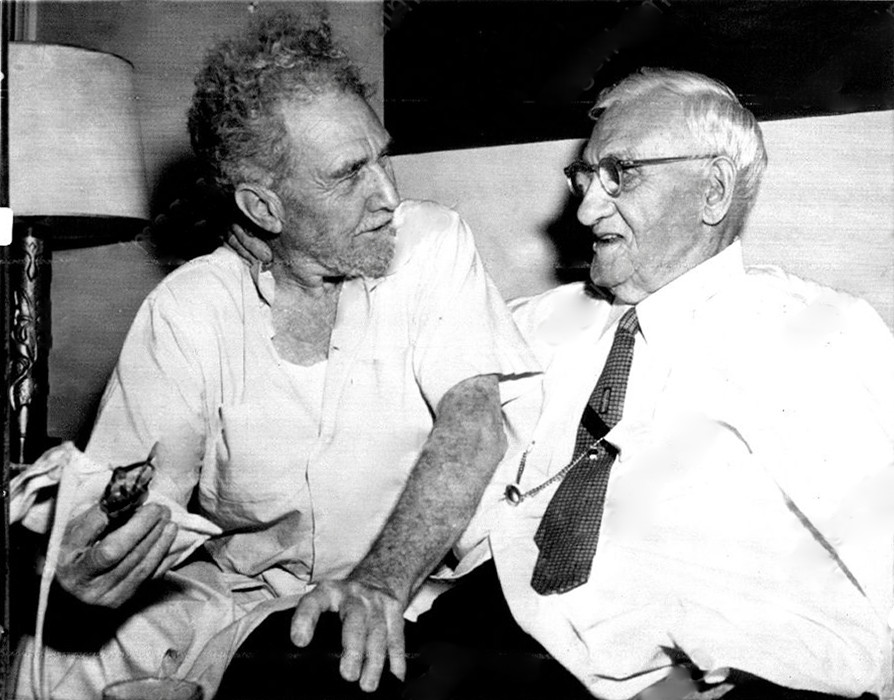
Pound with Congressman Usher Burdick just after his release from St. Elizabeth's in 1958. Burdick had helped to secure the release.

Pound and Dorothy arrived in Naples on the SS Cristoforo Colombo on 9 July 1958, where Pound was photographed giving a fascist salute to the waiting press. When asked when he had been released from the mental hospital, he replied: "I never was. When I left the hospital I was still in America, and all America is an insane asylum." They were accompanied by a young teacher Pound had met in hospital, Marcella Spann, ostensibly acting as his secretary. Disembarking at Genoa, the group arrived three days later at Schloss Brunnenburg, near Merano in South Tyrol, to live with his daughter Maria, where Pound met his grandchildren for the first time. (Note: The women soon fell out; "Canto CXIII" may have alluded to it: "Pride, jealousy and possessiveness / 3 pains of hell.") Dorothy had usually ignored his affairs, but she used her legal power over his royalties to make sure Spann was seen off, sent back to the United States in October 1959.

By December 1959 Pound was mired in depression. According to the writer Michael Reck, who visited him several times at St. Elizabeths, Pound was a changed man; he said little and called his work "worthless". In a 1960 interview in Rome with Donald Hall for The Paris Review, he said: "You—find me—in fragments." He paced up and down during the three days it took to complete the interview, never finishing a sentence, bursting with energy one minute, then sagging, and at one point seemed about to collapse. Hall said it was clear that he "doubted the value of everything he had done in his life".

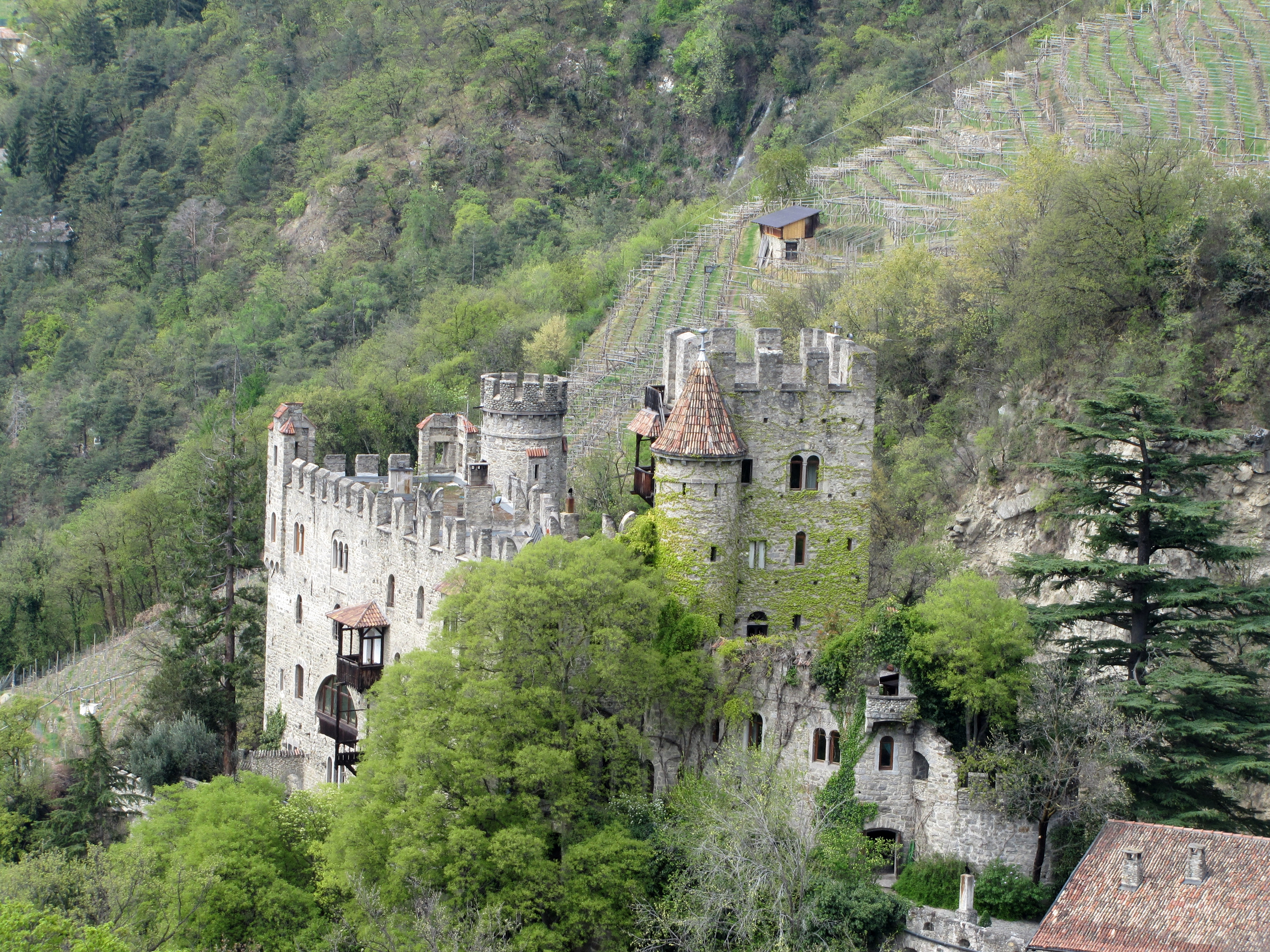
In 1958 Ezra and Dorothy lived with Mary at Brunnenburg.

Those close to him thought he had dementia, and in mid-1960 he spent time in a clinic when his weight dropped. He picked up again, but by early 1961 he had a urinary tract infection. Dorothy felt unable to look after him, so he went to live with Olga Rudge, first in Rapallo then in Venice; Dorothy mostly stayed in London after that with Omar. In 1961 Pound attended a meeting in Rome in honor of Oswald Mosley, who was visiting Italy. (Note: According to John Tytell and Humphrey Carpenter, he was photographed on May Day at the head of a neo-fascist Movimento Sociale Italiano parade of 500 men. According to Tim Redman and A. David Moody, this did not happen, and no such photograph has emerged.)

In 1966 he was admitted to the Genoa School of Medicine's psychiatric hospital for an evaluation after prostate surgery. His notes said he had psychomotor retardation, insomnia, depression, and he believed he had been "contaminated by microbes". According to a psychiatrist who treated him, Pound had previously been treated with electroconvulsive therapy. This time he was given imipramine and responded well. The doctors diagnosed bipolar disorder. Two years later he attended the opening of an exhibition in New York featuring his blue-inked version of Eliot's The Waste Land. He went on to Hamilton College and received a standing ovation.

=== Reck allegations ===
Pound's biographer, Michael Reck, claimed to have had an encounter with Pound at the restaurant of the Pensione Cici in Venice in 1967, during which Pound told Allen Ginsberg and Peter Russell that his own poems were "a lot of double talk" and made no sense, and that his writing was "a mess", "stupid and ignorant all the way through". Reck wrote about the meeting in Evergreen Review the following year. "At seventy I realized that instead of being a lunatic, I was a moron", Pound reportedly said. He "looked very morose" and barely spoke: "There is nothing harder than conversing with Pound nowadays", Reck wrote.

Pound had offered a carefully worded rejection of his antisemitism, according to Reck. When Ginsberg reassured Pound that he had "shown us the way", he is said to have replied: "Any good I've done has been spoiled by bad intentions—the preoccupation with irrelevant and stupid things." Reck continued: "Then very slowly, with emphasis, surely conscious of Ginsberg's being Jewish: 'But the worst mistake I made was that stupid, suburban prejudice of anti-Semitism.'" (Note: In 1988 Christopher Ricks took issue with Pound's use of the word mistake, which he wrote was "scarcely commensurate with the political and spiritual monstrosity" of Pound's antisemitism. Anthony Julius argued in 1995 that Pound's use of the term suburban was the result of "an arrogance that broods on the descent from an ideal of greatness rather than on the injury which that descent did to others".)

=== Death ===
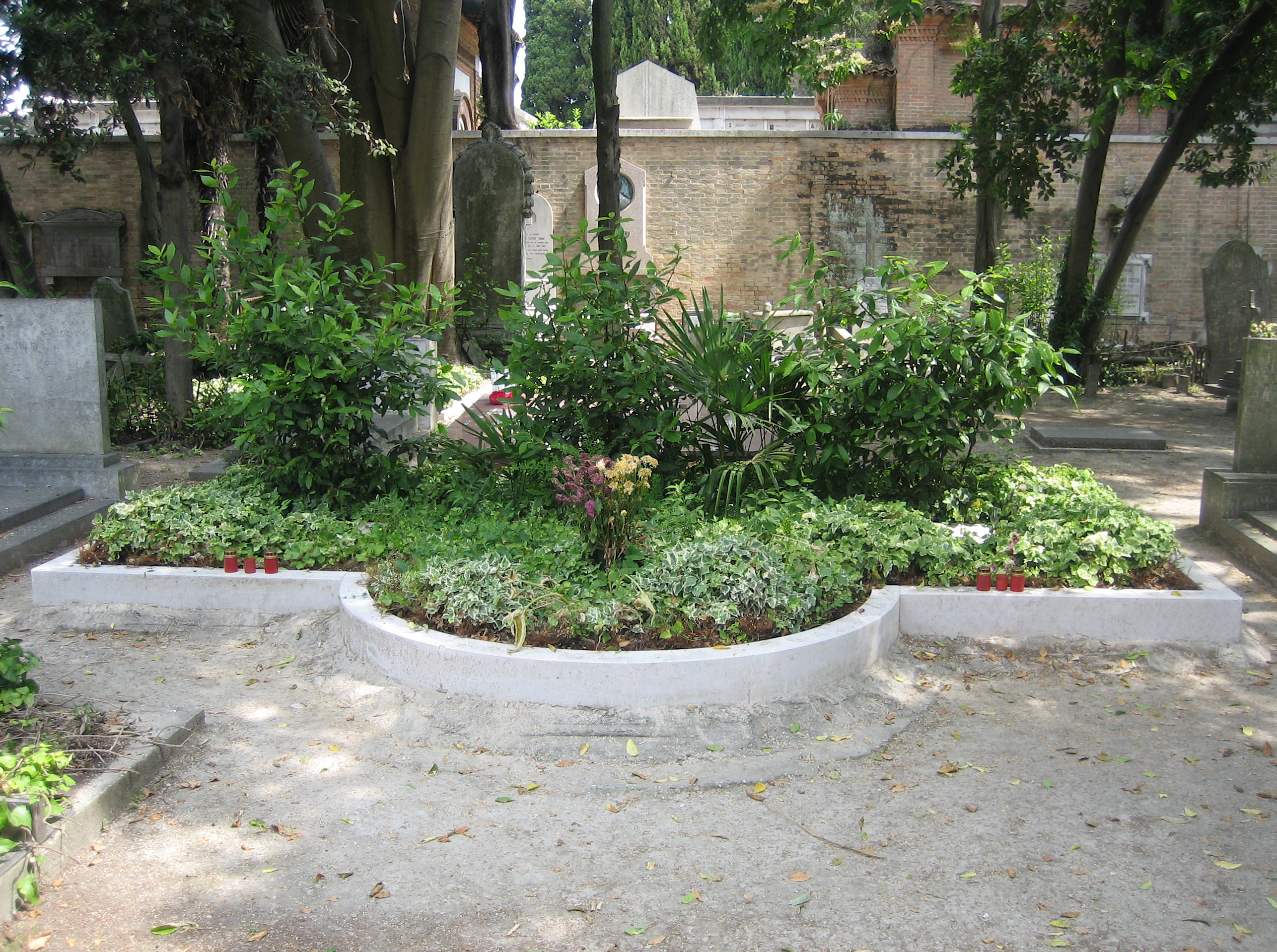
The graves of Pound and Olga Rudge at San Michele cemetery on the Isola di San Michele

Shortly before his death in 1972, an American Academy of Arts and Sciences committee, which included his publisher James Laughlin, proposed that Pound be awarded the Emerson-Thoreau Medal. After a storm of protest, the academy's council opposed it by 13 to 9. In the foreword of a Faber & Faber volume of his prose, he wrote in July: "In sentences referring to groups or races 'they' should be used with great care. re USURY: / I was out of focus, taking a symptom for a cause. / The cause is AVARICE."

On his 87th birthday, on 30 October 1972, he was too weak to leave his bedroom. The next night he was admitted to the San Giovanni e Paolo Civil Hospital in Venice, where he died in his sleep on 1 November of "sudden blockage of the intestine". Alerted by telegram, Dorothy Pound, who was living in a care home near Cambridge, England, requested a Protestant funeral in Venice. Telegrams were sent via American embassies in Rome and London, and the consulate in Milan, but Rudge would not change the plans she had already made for the morning of 3 November. Omar Pound flew to Venice as soon as he could, with Peter du Sautoy of Faber & Faber, but he arrived too late. Four gondoliers dressed in black rowed Pound's body to Venice's municipal cemetery, the San Michele cemetery, where, after a Protestant service, he was buried in the Protestant section of the cemetery, near Diaghilev and Stravinsky who rest at the adjoining Orthodox section, with other non-Catholic Christians. According to Hugh Kenner, Pound had wanted to be buried in Idaho with his bust by Henri Gaudier-Brzeska on his grave. Dorothy Pound died in England the following year, aged 87. Olga Rudge died in 1996, aged 100, and was buried next to Pound.

== Critical reception ==
=== Rehabilitation efforts, scholarship ===
After the Bollingen Prize in 1949, Pound's friends sought to rehabilitate him. James Laughlin's New Directions Publishing published his Selected Poems, with an introduction by Eliot, and a censored selection of The Cantos. Ralph Fletcher Seymour published Patria Mia (written around 1912) to show that Pound was an American patriot. In advertisements, magazine articles, and critical introductions, Pound's friends and publishers attributed his antisemitism and fascism to mental illness.

Literary scholar Betsy Erkkila writes that no one was more important to Pound's rehabilitation than Hugh Kenner, who was introduced to Pound by Marshall McLuhan in St. Elizabeths in May 1948, when Kenner was 25. Kenner's The Poetry of Ezra Pound (1951) adopted a New Critical approach, where all that mattered was the work itself.

New Directions and Faber & Faber published Ezra Pound: Translations in 1953, introduced by Kenner, and the following year Literary Essays of Ezra Pound, introduced by Eliot. The first PhD dissertation on Pound was completed in 1948, and by 1970 there were around ten a year. Kenner's The Pound Era (1971), which overlooked the fascism, antisemitism, World War II, treason, and the Bollingen Award, effectively equated Pound with modernism. Pound scholar Leon Surette argued that Kenner's approach was hagiographic. He included in this approach Caroll F. Terrell's Paideuma: A Journal Devoted to Ezra Pound Scholarship, founded in 1972 and edited by Kenner and Eva Hesse, (Note: From 2001 Paideuma began publishing material about modernist poetry in general, not only Pound.) and Terrell's two-volume A Companion to the Cantos of Ezra Pound (1980–1984). In 1971 Terrell founded the National Poetry Foundation to focus on Pound, and organized conferences on Pound in 1975, 1980, 1985, and 1990.

Following Eustace Mullins's biography, This Difficult Individual, Ezra Pound (1961), was Life of Ezra Pound (1970) by Noel Stock. A former reporter, Stock was one of the publishers of Pound's newspaper articles in the 1950s, including his antisemitism. Ronald Bush's The Genesis of Ezra Pound's Cantos (1976) became the first critical study of The Cantos. Several significant biographies appeared in the 1980s: J. J. Wilhelm's three-volume work (1985–1994), beginning with The American Roots of Ezra Pound; John Tytell's Ezra Pound: The Solitary Volcano (1987); and Humphrey Carpenter's 1005-page A Serious Character (1988). A. David Moody's three-volume Ezra Pound: Poet (2007–2015) combines biography with literary criticism.

Studies that examine Pound's relationships with the far right include Robert Casillo's The Genealogy of Demons (1988); Tim Redman's Ezra Pound and Italian Fascism (1999); Leon Surette's Pound in Purgatory (1999); Matthew Feldman's Ezra Pound's Fascist Propaganda, 1935–45 (2013); and Alec Marsh's John Kasper and Ezra Pound (2015).

=== Legacy ===
Canto CXVI

A little light, like a rushlight
To lead back to splendour.

— Closing lines of The Cantos

Much of Pound's legacy lies in his advancement of some of the best-known modernist writers of the early 20th century, particularly between 1910 and 1925. In addition to Eliot, Joyce, Lewis, Frost, Williams, Hemingway, H.D., Aldington, and Aiken, he befriended and helped Cummings, Bunting, Ford, Marianne Moore, Louis Zukofsky, Jacob Epstein, Margaret Anderson, George Oppen, and Charles Olson.

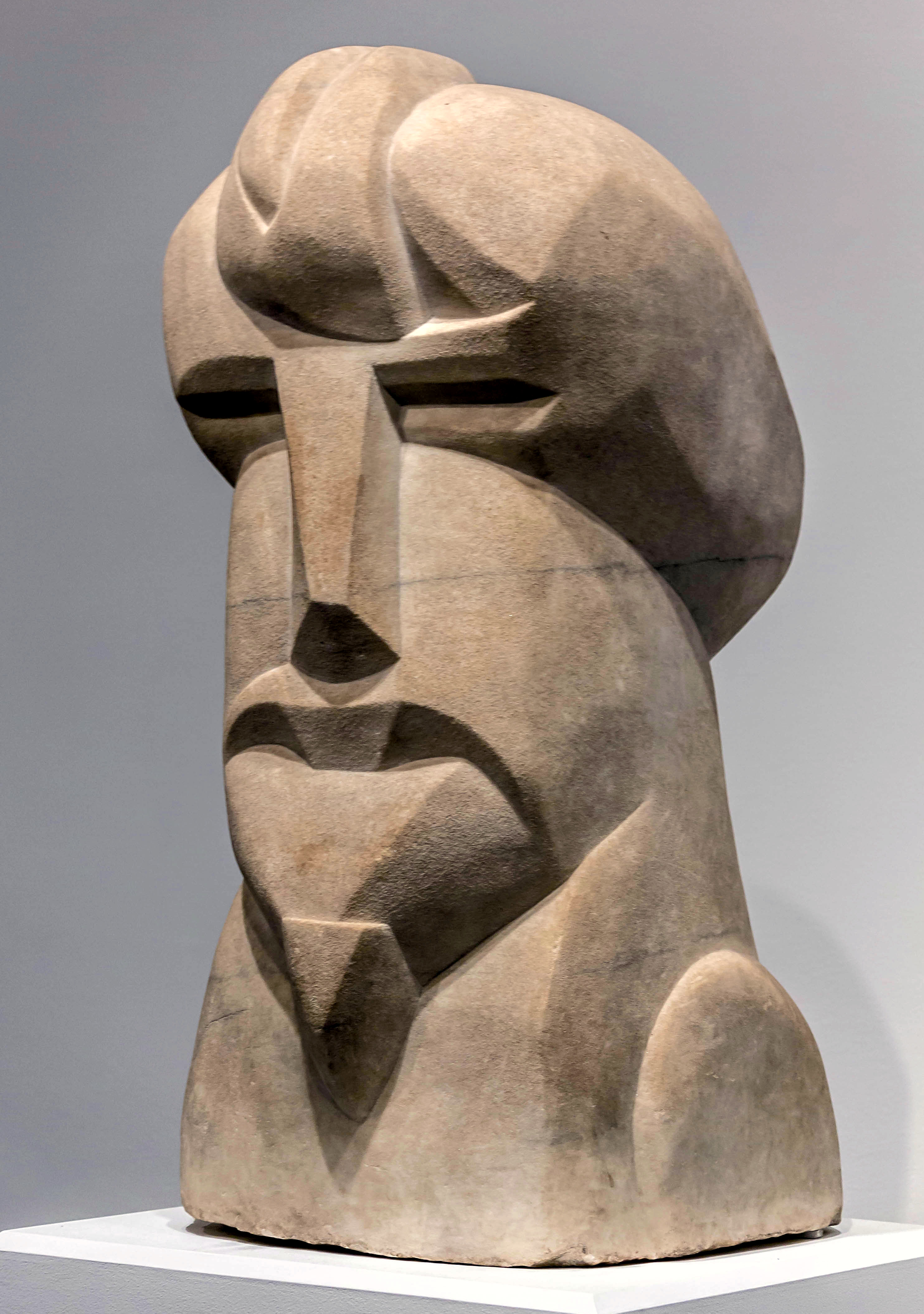
Ezra Pound in marble by Henri Gaudier-Brzeska (1914)

Beyond this, his legacy is mixed. He was a strong lyricist with an "ear" for words; his Times obituary said he had a "faultless sense of cadence". According to Ira Nadel, he "overturned poetic meter, literary style, and the state of the long poem". Nadel cited the importance of Pound's editing of The Waste Land, the publication of Ulysses, and his role in developing of Imagism. Hugh Witemeyer argued that Imagism was "probably the most important single movement" in 20th-century English-language poetry, because it affected all the leading poets of Pound's generation and the two generations after him. According to Hugh Kenner in 1951, although no great contemporary writer was less read than Pound, there was no one who could "over and over again appeal more surely, through sheer beauty of language" to people who would otherwise rather talk about poets than read them.

Against this, Robert Conquest argued in 1979 that critics were responsible for having promoted Pound despite his "minimal talent", which was "grossly exaggerated". "This is an accusation less against the fantastic arrogance of Pound", he wrote, "than against the narrow-minded obscurantism of the departments of English and the critical establishment who have set up a system of apologetics which the slyest Jesuit of the seventeenth century would have baulked at." According to Samuel Putnam, those who respected Pound's poetry were less likely to respect his prose or work as a critic.

The outrage over his collaboration with the Axis powers was so deep that it dominated the discussion. "A greater calamity cannot befall the art", Arthur Miller wrote in December 1945, "than that Ezra Pound, the Mussolini mouthpiece, should be welcomed back as an arbiter of American letters". Over the decades, according to Redman, critics argued that Pound was not really a poet or not really a fascist, or that he was a fascist but his poetry is not fascistic, or that there was an evil Pound and a good Pound. The American poet Elizabeth Bishop, 1956 Pulitzer Prize winner and one of his hospital visitors—Pound called her "Liz Bish"—reflected the ambivalence in her poem "Visits to St. Elizabeths" (1957). "This is the time / of the tragic man / that lies in the house of Bedlam." As the poem progresses, the tragic man, never named, becomes the talkative man; the honored man; the old, brave man; the cranky man; the cruel man; the busy man; the tedious man; the poet, the man; and, finally, the wretched man.

== Selected works ==
- (1908). A Lume Spento. Venice: A. Antonini (poems, privately printed).
- (1908). A Quinzaine for This Yule. London: Pollock (poems, privately printed); and Elkin Mathews.
- (1909). Personae. London: Elkin Mathews (poems).
- (1909). Exultations. London: Elkin Mathews (poems).
- (1910). The Spirit of Romance. London: J. M. Dent & Sons (prose).
- (1910). Provenca. Boston: Small, Maynard and Company (poems).
- (1911). Canzoni. London: Elkin Mathews (poems)
- (1912). The Sonnets and Ballate of Guido Cavalcanti Boston: Small, Maynard and Company (translations; cheaper edition destroyed by fire, London: Swift & Co).
- (1912). Ripostes. S. Swift, London, (poems; first mention of Imagism)
- (1915). Cathay. Elkin Mathews (poems; translations)
- (1916). Gaudier-Brzeska. A Memoir. London: John Lane (prose).
- (1916). Certain Noble Plays of Japan: From the Manuscripts of Ernest Fenollosa, chosen by Ezra Pound.
- (1916) with Ernest Fenollosa. "Noh", or, Accomplishment: A Study of the Classical Stage of Japan. London: Macmillan and Co.
- (1916). Lustra. London: Elkin Mathews (poems).
- (1917). Twelve Dialogues of Fontenelle (translations).
- (1917). Lustra. New York: Alfred A. Knopf (poems, with the first "Three Cantos").
- (1918). Pavannes and Divisions New York: Alfred A. Knopf (prose).
- (1918). Quia Pauper Amavi London: Egoist Press (poems).
- (1919). The Fourth Canto. London: Ovid Press (poem).
- (1920). Hugh Selwyn Mauberley. London: Ovid Press (poem).
- (1920). Umbra. London: Elkin Mathews (poems and translations).
- (1920) with Ernest Fenollosa. Instigations: Together with an Essay on the Chinese Written Character. New York: Boni & Liveright (prose).
- (1921). Poems, 1918–1921. New York: Boni & Liveright.
- (1922). Remy de Gourmont: The Natural Philosophy of Love. New York: Boni & Liveright (translation).
- (1923). Indiscretions, or, Une revue des deux mondes. Paris: Three Mountains Press.
- (1924) as William Atheling. Antheil and the Treatise on Harmony. Paris (essays).
- (1925). A Draft of XVI Cantos. Paris: Three Mountains Press. The first collection of The Cantos.
- (1926). Personae: The Collected Poems of Ezra Pound. New York: Boni & Liveright.
- (1928). A Draft of the Cantos 17–27. London: John Rodker.
- (1928). Selected Poems. Edited and with an introduction by T. S. Eliot. London: Faber & Faber.
- (1928). Ta Hio: The Great Learning, newly rendered into the American language. Seattle: University of Washington Bookstore (translation).
- (1930). A Draft of XXX Cantos. Paris: Nancy Cunard's Hours Press.
- (1930). Imaginary Letters. Paris: Black Sun Press. Eight essays from the Little Review, 1917–18.
- (1931). How to Read. Harmsworth (essays).
- (1932). Guido Cavalcanti Rime. Genoa: Edizioni Marsano (translations).
- (1933). ABC of Economics. London: Faber & Faber (essays).
- (1934). Eleven New Cantos: XXXI–XLI. New York: Farrar & Rinehart (poems).
- (1934). Homage to Sextus Propertius. London: Faber & Faber (poems).
- (1934). ABC of Reading. New Haven: Yale University Press (essays).
- (1934). Make It New. London: Faber & Faber (essays).
- (1935). Alfred Venison's Poems: Social Credit Themes by the Poet of Titchfield Street. London: Stanley Nott, Ltd. Pamphlets on the New Economics, No. 9 (essays).
- (1935). Jefferson and/or Mussolini. London: Stanley Nott. (essays).
- (1935). Social Credit: An Impact. London: Stanley Nott. (essays). Repr.: Peter Russell (1951). Money Pamphlets by Pound, no. 5, London.
- (1936) with Ernest Fenollosa. The Chinese Written Character as a Medium for Poetry. London: Stanley Nott.
- (1937). The Fifth Decad of Cantos. New York: Farrar & Rinehart (poems).
- (1937). Polite Essays. London: Faber & Faber (essays).
- (1937). Confucius: Digest of the Analects, edited and published by Giovanni Scheiwiller, (translations)
- (1938). Guide to Kulchur. New York: New Directions.
- (1939). What Is Money For?. Greater Britain Publications (essays). Money Pamphlets by Pound, no. 3. London: Peter Russell.
- (1940). Cantos LXII–LXXI. New Directions, New York (John Adams Cantos 62–71).
- (1942). Carta da Visita di Ezra Pound. Edizioni di lettere d'oggi. Rome. English translation by John Drummond: A Visiting Card. Money Pamphlets by Pound, no. 4. London: Peter Russell, 1952 (essays).
- (1944). L'America, Roosevelt e le cause della guerra presente. Casa editrice della edizioni popolari, Venice. English translation, by John Drummond: America, Roosevelt and the Causes of the Present War, Money Pamphlets by Pound, no. 6, Peter Russell, London 1951
- (1944). Introduzione alla Natura Economica degli S.U.A.. Casa editrice della edizioni popolari. Venice. English translation An Introduction to the Economic Nature of the United States, by Carmine Amore. Repr.: Peter Russell, Money Pamphlets by Pound, London 1950 (essay)
- (1944). Orientamenti. Casa editrice dalla edizioni popolari. Venice (prose)
- (1944). Oro et lavoro: alla memoria di Aurelio Baisi. Moderna, Rapallo. English translation: Gold and Work, Money Pamphlets by Pound, no. 2, Peter Russell, London 1952 (essays)
- (1948). If This Be Treason. Siena: privately printed for Olga Rudge by Tip Nuova (original drafts of six of Pound's Radio Rome broadcasts)
- (1948). The Pisan Cantos. New York: New Directions Publishing (Cantos 74–84)
- (1948). The Cantos of Ezra Pound (includes The Pisan Cantos). New Directions, poems
- (1949). Elektra (started in 1949, first performed 1987), a play by Ezra Pound and Rudd Fleming
- (1950). Seventy Cantos. London: Faber & Faber. OCLC 468875760
- (1950). Patria Mia. Chicago: R. F. Seymour (reworked New Age articles, 1912–1913). OCLC 230706458
- (1951). Confucius: The Great Digest and Unwobbling Pivot. New York: New Directions (translation). OCLC 334011927. (John) Kaspar & (David) Horton, Square $ Series, New York (translation)
- (1951). Confucius: Analects (John) Kaspar & (David) Horton, Square $ Series, New York (translation).
- (1954). The Classic Anthology Defined by Confucius. Harvard University Press (translations)
- (1954). Lavoro ed Usura. All'insegna del pesce d'oro. Milan (essays)
- (1955). Section: Rock-Drill, 85–95 de los Cantares. All'insegna del pesce d'oro, Milan (poems)
- (1956). Sophocles: The Women of Trachis. A Version by Ezra Pound. Neville Spearman, London (translation)
- (1957). Brancusi. Milan (essay)
- (1959). Thrones: 96–109 de los Cantares. New York: New Directions (poems).
- (1968). Drafts and Fragments: Cantos CX–CXVII. New York: New Directions (poems).

== Citations ==
=== Works cited ===
- Adams, Stephen J. (2005). "Hugh Selwyn Mauberley". In Demetres P. Tryphonopoulos and Stephen Adams (eds.) The Ezra Pound Encyclopedia. Westport, CT: Greenwood. ISBN 978-0-313-30448-4
- Albright, Daniel (2001) [1999]. "Early Cantos: I–XLI", in Ira Nadel (ed.). The Cambridge Companion to Ezra Pound. Cambridge: Cambridge University Press. 59–91. ISBN 978-0-521-64920-9
- Aldington, Richard (1941). Life for Life's Sake: A Book of Reminiscences. New York: The Viking Press. OCLC 366128966
- Alexander, Michael (1979). The Poetic Achievement of Ezra Pound. Berkeley: University of California Press. ISBN 978-0-7486-0981-9
- Alexander, Michael (1997). "Ezra Pound as Translator". Translation and Literature. 6(1), 23–30. JSTOR 40339757
- Arrowsmith, Rupert Richard (2011). Modernism and the Museum: Asian, African, and Pacific Art and the London Avant-Garde. Oxford: Oxford University Press. ISBN 978-0-19-959369-9
- Bacigalupo, Massimo (2001) [1999]. "Pound as Critic". In Ira Nadel (ed.). The Cambridge Companion to Ezra Pound. Cambridge: Cambridge University Press. 188–203. ISBN 978-0-521-64920-9
- Bacigalupo, Massimo (2020). Ezra Pound, Italy, and the Cantos. Clemson, SC: Clemson University Press. ISBN 978-1-949979-00-8
- Baker, Carlos (1981). Ernest Hemingway Selected Letters 1917–1961. New York: Charles Scribner's Sons. ISBN 978-0-684-16765-7
- Barnhisel, Greg (September 1998). "'Hitch Your Wagon to a Star': The Square Dollar Series and Ezra Pound". The Papers of the Bibliographical Society of America. 92 (3): 273–295. doi:10.1086/pbsa.92.3.24304448. JSTOR 24304448. S2CID 111416528.
- Baumann, Walter (Fall & Winter 1983). "But to affirm the gold thread in the patten [116/797]: An examination of Canto 116". Paideuma: Modern and Contemporary Poetry and Poetics. 12(2/3), 199–221. JSTOR 24726005
- Baumann, Walter (Winter 1984). "Ezra Pound's Metamorphosis during his London Years: From Late-Romanticism to Modernism". Paideuma: Modern and Contemporary Poetry and Poetics. 13(3), 357–373. JSTOR 24722956
- Beach, Christopher (2003). The Cambridge Introduction to Twentieth-Century American Poetry. Cambridge: Cambridge University Press. ISBN 0-521-81469-3
- Beasley, Rebecca (2010). "Pound's New Criticism". Textual Practice. 24(4), 649–668. doi:10.1080/0950236X.2010.499652
- Bishop, Elizabeth (Spring 1957). "Visits to St. Elizabeths". Partisan Review, 185–187. Also in Bishop, Elizabeth (1965). Questions of Travel. New York: Farrar, Straus and Giroux, 92–95. Courtesy link, Poetry Foundation.
- Bigsby, C. W. E. (2009). Arthur Miller, 1915–1962. Cambridge, MA: Harvard University Press. ISBN 978-0-674-03505-8.
- Bornstein, George (2001) [1999]. "Pound and the making of modernism". In Ira B. Nadel (ed.). The Cambridge Companion to Ezra Pound. Cambridge: Cambridge University Press. pp. 22–42. ISBN 978-0-521-64920-9.
- Bush, Ronald (1976). The Genesis of Ezra Pound's Cantos. Princeton, New Jersey: Princeton University Press.
- Carpenter, Humphrey (1988). A Serious Character: The Life of Ezra Pound. Boston: Houghton Mifflin. ISBN 978-0-395-41678-5
- Carswell, John (1978). Lives and Letters: A. R. Orage, Beatrice Hastings, Katherine Mansfield, John Middleton Murry, S. S. Koteliansky, 1906–1957. New York: New Directions Publishing. ISBN 0-8112-0681-5
- Casillo, Robert (1988). The Genealogy of Demons: Anti-Semitism, Fascism, and the Myths of Ezra Pound. Evanston: Northwestern University Press. ISBN 978-0810107106
- Coats, Jason M. (Spring 2009). "'Part of the War Waste': Pound, Imagism, and Rhetorical Excess". Twentieth Century Literature. 55(1), 80–113. JSTOR 40599965
- Cohassey, John (2014). Hemingway and Pound: A Most Unlikely Friendship. Jefferson, NC: McFarland & Company. ISBN 978-0-7864-7640-4
- Cockram, Patricia (2005). "Pound, Isabel Weston". In Demetres P. Tryphonopoulos and Stephen Adams (eds.) The Ezra Pound Encyclopedia. Westport, CT: Greenwood, 238–239. ISBN 978-0-313-30448-4
- Conover, Anne (2001). Olga Rudge and Ezra Pound: "What Thou Lovest Well ...". New Haven, CT: Yale University Press. ISBN 978-0300087031
- Conquest, Robert (1979). "Ezra Pound". In The Abomination of Moab. London: Temple Smith, 236–256. OCLC 1152724310
- Corrigan, Robert A. (October 1977). "Literature and Politics: The Case of Ezra Pound Reconsidered". Prospects, 2, 463–482. doi:10.1017/S0361233300002477
- Czech, Danuta (2000). "A Calendar of the Most Important Events in the History of the Auschwitz Concentration Camp". In Długoborski, Wacław; Piper, Franciszek (eds.). Auschwitz, 1940–1945. Central Issues in the History of the Camp. Vol. V: Epilogue. Oświęcim: Auschwitz-Birkenau State Museum. pp. 119–231. ISBN 978-83-85047-87-2.
- Dennis, Helen May (2001) [1999]. "Pound, Women and Gender". In Ira Nadel (ed.) The Cambridge Companion to Ezra Pound. Cambridge: Cambridge University Press, 264–283. ISBN 978-0-521-64920-9
- Doob, Leonard, ed. (1978). 'Ezra Pound Speaking': Radio Speeches of WWII. Westport, CT and London: Greenwood Press. ISBN 978-0-313-20057-1.
- H.D. (1979). End to Torment. New York: New Directions Publishing. ISBN 978-0-8112-0720-1
- Doyle, Charles (2016) {1989]. Richard Aldington: A Biography. Basingstoke and London: Macmillan. ISBN 978-1-349-10226-6
- Eliot, T. S. (June 1915). "The Love Song of J. Alfred Prufrock". Poetry. VI(III), 130–135.
- Eliot, T. S. (September 1946). "Ezra Pound". Poetry. LXVIII(VI), 326–338.
- Erkkila, Betsy (ed.) (2011). Ezra Pound: The Contemporary Reviews. New York: Cambridge University Press. ISBN 978-0-521-40139-5
- Feldman, Matthew (Winter 2012). "The 'Pound Case' in Historical Perspective: An Archival Overview". Journal of Modern Literature. 35(2), 83–97. doi:10.2979/jmodelite.35.2.83
- Feldman, Matthew (2013). Ezra Pound's Fascist Propaganda, 1935–45. New York: Palgrave Macmillan. ISBN 978-1-137-34550-9
- Feldman, Matthew (2016). [2014]. "Pound and Radio Treason: An Empirical Reassessment". In Matthew Feldman, Henry Mead, Erik Tonning (eds.). Broadcasting in the Modernist Era. London and New York: Bloomsbury, 213–244. ISBN 978-1-4742-7558-3
- Ford, Ford Madox (1931). Return to Yesterday: Reminiscences 1894–1914. London: Victor Gollancz Ltd.
- Gery, John (2005). "Exultations". In Demetres P. Tryphonopoulos and Stephen Adams (eds.). The Ezra Pound Encyclopedia. Westport, CT: Greenwood, 114–115. ISBN 978-0-313-30448-4
- Gill, Jonathan P. (2005). "Ezra Pound Speaking: Radio Speeches on World War II". In Demetres P. Tryphonopoulos and Stephen Adams (eds.). The Ezra Pound Encyclopedia. Westport, CT: Greenwood, 115–116. ISBN 978-0-313-30448-4
- Gill, Jonathan P. (2005). "If This Be Treason ...". In Demetres P. Tryphonopoulos and Stephen Adams (eds.). The Ezra Pound Encyclopedia. Westport, CT: Greenwood, 155. ISBN 978-0-313-30448-4
- Graves, Robert (1 April 1955). "These Be Your Gods, O Israel!" Essays in Criticism. V(2), 129–150. doi:10.1093/eic/V.2.129
- Hale, William Gardner (April 1919). "Pegasus Impounded". Poetry. XIV(I), 53–55.
- Hall, Donald (Summer–Fall 1962). "Ezra Pound, The Art of Poetry No. 5". The Paris Review (28). Archived from the original on 11 November 2025.
- Haller, Evelyn (2005). "Mosley, Sir Oswald". In Demetres P. Tryphonopoulos and Stephen Adams (eds.) The Ezra Pound Encyclopedia. Westport, CT: Greenwood. ISBN 978-0-313-30448-4
- Hemingway, Ernest (Spring 1925). "Homage to Ezra". This Quarter. 1, 221–225.
- Hemingway, Ernest. Bruccoli, Matthew and Baughman, Judith (eds.) (2006). Hemingway and the Mechanism of Fame. Columbia, SC: University of South Carolina Press. ISBN 978-1-57003-599-9
- Hickman, Miranda B. (2005). The Geometry of Modernism: The Vorticist Idiom in Lewis, Pound, H.D., and Yeats. Austin, TX: University of Texas Press. ISBN 978-0-292-70943-0
- Hillyer, Robert (11 June 1949). "Treason's Strange Fruit: The Case of Ezra Pound and the Bollingen Award". The Saturday Review of Literature. xxxii/24, 9–11, 28.
- Hillyer, Robert (18 June 1949). "Poetry's New Priesthood". The Saturday Review of Literature, 7–9, 38.
- Hitchens, Christopher (April 2008). "A Revolutionary Simpleton". The Atlantic. Archived from the original on 21 August 2025.
- Holmes, Colin (2016) [1979]. Anti-Semitism in British Society, 1876–1939. Abingdon and New York: Routledge. ISBN 978-1-138-93422-1
- Houen, Alex (2010). "Antisemitism". In Ira B. Nadel (ed.). Ezra Pound in Context. New York: Cambridge University Press. ISBN 978-0-521-51507-8
- Huang, Michelle Ling-Ying (2015). "Chinese Artistic Influences on the Vorticists in London". In Anne Witchard (ed.). British Modernism and Chinoiserie. Edinburgh: Edinburgh University Press. ISBN 978-0-7486-9095-4
- Hutchins, Patricia (1965). Ezra Pound's Kensington: An Exploration 1885–1913. London: Faber and Faber.
- Ingham, Michael (2001) [1999]. "Pound and Music". In Ira Nadel (ed.). The Cambridge Companion to Ezra Pound. Cambridge: Cambridge University Press, 236–248. ISBN 978-0-521-64920-9
- Johnson, Edd (9 May 1945). "Confucius and Kindred Subjects/Pound, Accused of Treason, Calls Hitler, Saint, Martyr". Chicago Sun. Also in Philadelphia Record as "Poet-Prisoner Pound Calls Hitler Saint".
- Julius, Anthony (1997) [1995]. T. S. Eliot, anti-semitism, and literary form. Cambridge and New York: Cambridge University Press. ISBN 0-521-58673-9
- Karachalios, Evan R. (Spring 1995). "Sacrifice and Selectivity in Ezra Pound's First Canto". Paideuma: Modern and Contemporary Poetry and Poetics. 24(1), 95–106. JSTOR 24726328
- Kavka, Jerome (Spring & Fall 1991). "Ezra Pound's Personal History: A Transcript". Paideuma: Modern and Contemporary Poetry and Poetics. 20(1/2), 143–185. JSTOR 24724838
- Kearns, George (1989). Pound: The Cantos. Cambridge and New York: Cambridge University Press. ISBN 978-0521336499
- Kenner, Hugh. (Winter 1949). "Review: In the Caged Panther's Eyes". The Hudson Review. 1(4), 580–586. JSTOR 3847824
- Kenner, Hugh. (1951). The Poetry of Ezra Pound. London: Faber & Faber.
- Kenner, Hugh. (November 1952). "Gold in the Gloom". Poetry. 81(2), 127–132.
- Kenner, Hugh (1973) [1971]. The Pound Era. Berkeley and Los Angeles: University of California Press. ISBN 0-520-02427-3
- Kern, Robert (1996). Orientalism, Modernism, and the American Poem. Cambridge and New York: Cambridge University Press. ISBN 978-0-521-49613-1.
- Kimpel, Ben D. and Eaves, T. C. Duncan (November 1981). "More on Pound's Prison Experience". American Literature. 53(1), 469–476. JSTOR 2926232
- Kimpel, Ben D. and Eaves, T. C. Duncan (March 1983). "Ezra Pound on Hitler's Economic Policies"]. American Literature. 55(1), 48–54. JSTOR 2925881
- Knapp, James F. (1979). Ezra Pound. Boston: Twayne Publishers. ISBN 0-8057-7286-3
- Kubica, Helena (1998) [1994]. "Children". In Gutman, Yisrael; Berenbaum, Michael (eds.). Anatomy of the Auschwitz Death Camp. Bloomington: Indiana University Press. pp. 412–427. ISBN 0-253-20884-X.
- Kutler, Stanley I. (1983). American Inquisition: Justice and Injustice in the Cold War. New York: Hill & Wang.
- Laughlin, James (Fall 1986). "Ez as Wuz". San José Studies. XII(3), 6–28.
- Leavis, F. R. (1942) (1932). New Bearings in English Poetry: A Study of the Contemporary Situation. London: Chatto & Windus.
- Lewis, Anthony (14 April 1958). "U.S. asked to end Pound indictment". The New York Times.
- Lewis, Wyndham (1931). Hitler. London: Chatto & Windus.
- Longenbach, James (10 January 1988). "The Odd Couple: Pound and Yeats Together". The New York Times.
- Longenbach, James (1990) [1988]. Stone Cottage: Pound, Yeats and Modernism. New York: Oxford University Press. ISBN 0-19-506662-6
- Lowell, Amy (1955). The Complete Poetical Works of Amy Lowell. Boston: Houghton Mifflin Company.
- Marsh, Alec (2011). Ezra Pound. London: Reaktion Books. ISBN 978-1-86189-862-3
- Marsh, Alec (2015). John Kasper and Ezra Pound: Saving the Republic. London and New York: Bloomsbury. ISBN 978-1-4725-0886-7.
- McDonald, Gail (2005). "Education: Personal". In Demetres P. Tryphonopoulos and Stephen Adams (eds.) The Ezra Pound Encyclopedia. Westport, CT: Greenwood, 90–92 ISBN 978-0-313-30448-4
- McGuire, William (2020) [1982]. Bollingen: An Adventure in Collecting the Past. Princeton and Guilford: Princeton University Press. ISBN 978-0-691-21833-5
- Menand, Louis (9 June 2008). "The Pound Error". The New Yorker. Archived from the original on 16 April 2026.
- Meyers, Jeffrey (1985). Hemingway: A Biography. New York: Macmillan. ISBN 978-0-333-42126-0
- Moody, A. David (2007). Ezra Pound: Poet. A Portrait of the Man and His Work. I: The Young Genius 1885–1920. Oxford: Oxford University Press. ISBN 978-0-19-957146-8
- Moody, A. David (2014). Ezra Pound: Poet. A Portrait of the Man and His Work. II: The Epic Years 1921–1939. Oxford: Oxford University Press. ISBN 978-0-19-921558-4
- Moody, A. David (2015). Ezra Pound: Poet. A Portrait of the Man and His Work. III: The Tragic Years 1939–1972. Oxford: Oxford University Press. ISBN 978-0-19-870436-2
- Montgomery, Paul L. (2 November 1972). "Ezra Pound: A Man of Contradictions". The New York Times. Archived from the original on 29 July 2025.
- Nadel, Ira (2001) [1999]. "Introduction". In Ira Nadel (ed.). The Cambridge Companion to Ezra Pound. Cambridge: Cambridge University Press. 1–21. ISBN 978-0-521-64920-9
- Nadel, Ira (2005). "Introduction". In Ira Nadel (ed.). Ezra Pound. Early Writings: Poems and Prose. London: Penguin Books. ISBN 0-14-218013-0
- Nadel, Ira (2007). The Cambridge Introduction to Ezra Pound. New York: Cambridge University Press. ISBN 978-0-521-85391-0
- Nadel, Ira (2010). "The Lives of Pound". In Ira Nadel (ed.). Ezra Pound in Context. Cambridge: Cambridge University Press. ISBN 978-0-521-51507-8
- Nicholls, Peter (2001) [1999]. "Beyond The Cantos: Ezra Pound and recent American poetry". In Ira Nadel (ed.) The Cambridge Companion to Ezra Pound. Cambridge: Cambridge University Press. 139–160.ISBN 978-0-521-64920-9
- Orage, A. R. as R.H.C. (31 January 1921). "Readers and Writers". The New Age. xxviii, 126–127.
- Olson, Charles (1991) [1975]. Charles Olson & Ezra Pound: An Encounter at St. Elizabeths. Edited by Catherine Seelye. New York: Paragon House. ISBN 978-1557783455
- Plimpton, George (Spring 1958). "Ernest Hemingway, The Art of Fiction No. 21". The Paris Review (18). Archived from the original on 21 May 2026.
- Pound, Ezra (April 1909). Personae. London: Elkin Mathews.
- Pound, Ezra (1910). The Spirit of Romance. London: J. M. Dent & Sons.
- Pound, Ezra (1912). Ripostes. London: Stephen Swift & Co Ltd.
- Pound, Ezra (March 1913). "A Few Don'ts by an Imagiste". Poetry. I(6), 200–206.
- Pound, Ezra (April 1913). "In a Station of the Metro". Poetry. II(1), 40.
- Pound, Ezra (ed.) (1914). Des Imagistes. New York: Albert and Charles Boni.
- Pound, Ezra (June 1914). "Vortex" Archived 19 March 2022 at the Wayback Machine. BLAST, edited by Wyndham Lewis, no. 1.
- Pound, Ezra (1915). Cathay. London: Elkin Mathews.
- Pound, Ezra (1916). Gaudier-Brzeska: A Memoir. London and New York: John Lane, The Bodley Head.
- Pound, Ezra (June 1917). "Three Cantos: I". Poetry. X(III), 113–121.
- Pound, Ezra (July 1917). "Three Cantos: II". Poetry. X(IV), 180–188.
- Pound, Ezra (August 1917)]. "Three Cantos: III". Poetry. X(V), 248–254.
- Pound, Ezra (1918). "A Retrospect". Pavannes and Divisions. New York: Alfred A. Knopf, 95–111.
- Pound, Ezra (1920). "Hugh Selwyn Mauberley". London: The Ovid Press.
- Pound, Ezra (1934). "Cavalcanti". Make It New. London: Faber & Faber, 345–407.
- Pound, Ezra (Jan–Mar 1947). "Canto LXXVI". The Sewanee Review. 55(1), 56–67. JSTOR 27537713
- Pound, Ezra (Summer Fall 1962). "Canto 116". The Paris Review. 28, 14–16.
- Pound, Ezra (1970) [1967]. Pound/Joyce: The Letters of Ezra Pound to James Joyce. Edited by Forrest Read. New York: New Directions Publishing. ISBN 0-8112-0159-7
- Pound, Ezra (1974) [June 1914]. "How I Began". In Grace Schulman (ed.). Ezra Pound: A Collection of Criticism. New York: McGraw-Hill Book Company, 23–26. ISBN 0-07-055634-2
- Pound, Ezra (1990) [1926]. Personae: The Shorter Poems of Ezra Pound. Revised edition. Edited by Lea Baechler and A. Walter Litz. New York: New Directions Publishing.
- Pound, Ezra (1996) [1970]. The Cantos of Ezra Pound. New York: New Directions Publishing. ISBN 978-0811203500
- Pound, Ezra (2003a). Poems and Translations. New York: Library of America. ISBN 978-1931082419
- Pound, Ezra (2003b) [1948]. The Pisan Cantos. Edited by Richard Sieburth. New York: New Directions Books. ISBN 978-0-8112-1558-9
- Pound, Omar and Litz, A. Walton (1984). Ezra Pound and Dorothy Shakespear. Their Letters: 1909–1914. New York: New Directions Publishing. ISBN 0-8112-0900-8
- Pound, Omar and Spoo, Robert (1999). Ezra and Dorothy Pound: Letters in Captivity, 1945–1946. Oxford: Oxford University Press. ISBN 978-0195107937
- Preda, Roxana (2005a). "Economics". In Demetres P. Tryphonopoulos and Stephen Adams (eds.). The Ezra Pound Encyclopedia. Westport, CT: Greenwood, 87–89. ISBN 978-0-313-30448-4
- Preda, Roxana (2005b). "Economics: Usury". In Demetres P. Tryphonopoulos and Stephen Adams (eds.). The Ezra Pound Encyclopedia. Westport, CT: Greenwood, 89–90. ISBN 978-0-313-30448-4
- Punch magazine (January–June 1909). Volume 136.
- Putnam, Samuel (1947). Paris Was Our Mistress: Memoirs of a Lost and Found Generation. New York: Viking Press. OCLC 785825324
- Qian, Zhaoming (2000). "Pound and Chinese Art in the 'British Museum Era'". In Dennis, Helen M. (ed). Ezra Pound and Poetic Influence. The Official Proceedings of the 17th International Ezra Pound Conference. Amsterdam and Atlanta: Rodopi, pp. 100–113. ISBN 978-90-420-1523-4
- Reck, Michael (June 1968). "A Conversation between Ezra Pound and Allen Ginsberg". Evergreen Review. 12 (55): 27–29, 84.
- Reck, Michael (9 October 1986). "An Exchange on Ezra Pound". The New York Review of Books.
- Redman, Tim (1991). Ezra Pound and Italian Fascism. Cambridge: Cambridge University Press. ISBN 978-0-521-37305-0
- Redman, Tim (2001) [1999]. "Pound's politics and economics". In Ira Nadel (ed.). The Cambridge Companion to Ezra Pound. Cambridge: Cambridge University Press, 249–263. ISBN 978-0-521-64920-9
- Reynolds, Michael (2000) [1999]. Hemingway: The Final Years. New York: W. W. Norton & Company. ISBN 978-0-393-04748-6
- Ricks, Christopher (1988). T. S. Eliot and Prejudice. Berkeley and Los Angeles: University of California Press. ISBN 0-520-06578-6
- Rossi, Romolo (2008). "A Psychiatrist's Recollections of Ezra Pound" Archived 28 February 2021 at the Wayback Machine. Quaderni di Palazzo Serra. 15, 144–149.
- Sarfatti, Michele (2006). The Jews in Mussolini's Italy: From Equality to Persecution. Madison, WI: The University of Wisconsin Press. ISBN 978-0299217341
- Sandburg, Carl (February 1916). "The Work of Ezra Pound". Poetry.
- Sieburth, Richard (August 1979). "Review: He Do the Enemy in Different Voices". Poetry. 134(5), 292–302. JSTOR 20593569
- Sieburth, Richard (2003). "Introduction". In Ezra Pound. The Pisan Cantos. New York: New Directions Books, ix–xliii. ISBN 978-0-8112-1558-9
- Slatin, Myles (October 1955). "More by Ezra Pound". The Yale University Library Gazette. 30(2), 74–80. JSTOR 24467830
- Spoo, Robert (2005). "Cravens, Margaret (1881–1912)". In Demetres P. Tryphonopoulos and Stephen Adams (eds.). The Ezra Pound Encyclopedia. Westport, CT: Greenwood, 67. ISBN 978-0-313-30448-4
- Stein, Gertrude (1933). The Autobiography of Alice B. Toklas. New York: The Literary Guild. OCLC 33340888
- Stoicheff, Peter (Spring 1986)."The Composition and Publication History of Ezra Pound's Drafts & Fragments"]. Twentieth Century Literature. 32(1), 78–94. JSTOR 441307
- Stoicheff, Peter (1995). The Hall of Mirrors: Drafts & Fragments and the End of Ezra Pound's Cantos. Ann Arbor: The University of Michigan Press. ISBN 0-472-10526-4
- Stock, Noel (1970). The Life of Ezra Pound. New York: Pantheon Books. OCLC 911707588
- Surette, Leon and Tryphonopoulos, Demetres (2005). "'With usura hath no man a house of good stone' (Pound, Canto 45): An Interview with Leon Surette". ESC: English Studies in Canada.
- Swift, Daniel (2017). The Bughouse: The Poetry, Politics, and Madness of Ezra Pound. New York: Farrar, Straus and Giroux. ISBN 978-0-374-28404-6
- Tate, Allen (1955). "Ezra Pound and the Bollingen Prize". In Allen Tate (ed.). The Man Of Letters In The Modern World. New York: Meridian Books, 264–267.
- Terrell, Carroll F. (1993) [1980–1984]. A Companion to The Cantos of Ezra Pound. Berkeley: University of California Press. ISBN 978-0-520-08287-8
- Thacker, Andrew (2018) [2010]. The Imagist Poets. Tavistock: Northcote House Publishers. ISBN 978-0-7463-1002-1
- Torrey, Edwin Fuller (1992) [1984]. The Roots of Treason and the Secret of St. Elizabeths. Bethesda, MD: Lucas Books. ISBN 978-1-929636-01-3
- Tremblay, Tony (Fall & Winter 1998). "The Literary Occult in the Letters of Marshall McLuhan and Ezra Pound"]. Paideuma: Modern and Contemporary Poetry and Poetics. 27(2/3), 107–127. JSTOR 24726190
- Tryphonopoulous, Demetres; Surette, Leon, eds. (1998). 'I Cease not to Yowl': Ezra Pound's Letters to Olivia Rossetti Agresti. Chicago: University of Illinois Press. ISBN 978-0-252-02410-8.
- Tryphonopoulous, Demetres and Dunton, Sara (2019). "To Translate or Not To Translate? Pound's Prosodic Provocations in Hugh Selwyn Mauberley". In Lynn Kozak, Miranda Hickman (eds.). The Classics in Modernist Translation. London and New York: Bloomsbury. ISBN 978-1350177468
- Twitchell-Waas, Jeffrey (2020). "Ezra Pound and Chinese Poetry". In Byron, Mark (ed.). The New Ezra Pound Studies. Cambridge: Cambridge University Press. ISBN 978-1-108-49901-9.
- Tytell, John (1987). Ezra Pound: The Solitary Volcano. New York: Anchor Press/Doubleday. ISBN 978-0-385-19694-9.
- Van Gelder, Lawrence (19 March 1996). "Olga Rudge, 101, Ezra Pound's Companion, Dies". The New York Times. Archived from the original on 26 May 2015.
- Wallace, Emily Mitchell (2010). "America". In Ira B. Nadel (ed.). Ezra Pound in Context. New York: Cambridge University Press, 202–220. ISBN 978-0-521-51507-8
- Webb, Clive (2011). Rabble Rousers: The American Far Right in the Civil Rights Era. Athens: University of Georgia Press.
- Wilhelm, James J. (1985a). The American Roots of Ezra Pound. New York: Garland Publishing, 1985. ISBN 978-0-8240-7500-2
- Wilhelm, James J. (1985b). "Pounds's four fascinating grandparents". Paideuma: Modern and Contemporary Poetry and Poetics. 14(2/3), Fall & Winter, 377–384. JSTOR 24725013
- Wilhelm, James J. (1990). Ezra Pound in London and Paris, 1908–1925. University Park, PA: Pennsylvania State University Press. ISBN 978-0-271-02798-2
- Wilhelm, James J. (1994). Ezra Pound: The Tragic Years 1925–1972. University Park, PA: Pennsylvania State University Press. ISBN 0-271-01082-7
- Wilson, Peter (2014) [1997]. A Preface to Ezra Pound. Abingdon and New York: Routledge. ISBN 978-0-582-25867-9
- Witemeyer, Hugh (1981) [1969]. The Poetry of Ezra Pound: Forms and Renewal 1908–1920. Berkeley: University of California Press. ISBN 0-520-04515-7
- Witemeyer, Hugh (2001) [1999]. "Early Poetry 1908–1920". In Ira Nadel (ed.). The Cambridge Companion to Ezra Pound. Cambridge: Cambridge University Press. 43–58. ISBN 978-0-521-64920-9
- Witemeyer, Hugh (2005a). "A Lume Spento". In Demetres P. Tryphonopoulos and Stephen Adams (eds.) The Ezra Pound Encyclopedia. Westport, CT: Greenwood, 185–186. ISBN 978-0-313-30448-4
- Witemeyer, Hugh (2005b). "A Quinzaine for This Yule". In Demetres P. Tryphonopoulos and Stephen Adams (eds.) The Ezra Pound Encyclopedia. Westport, CT: Greenwood, 249. ISBN 978-0-313-30448-4
- Yao, Steven G. (2010). "Translation", Ira B. Nadel (ed.) in Ezra Pound in Context. New York: Cambridge University Press. ISBN 978-0-521-51507-8
- Ying, Li-hua (2010). "An Qi". Historical Dictionary of Modern Chinese Literature. The Scarecrow Press.
