= De Rachewiltz =

De Rachewiltz is a surname. Notable people with the surname include:

- Boris de Rachewiltz (1926–1997), Italian Egyptologist
- Igor de Rachewiltz (1929–2016), Italian Mongolist
- Mary de Rachewiltz (1925–2026), American poet and translator
