= Ezra Pound's radio broadcasts, 1941–1945 =

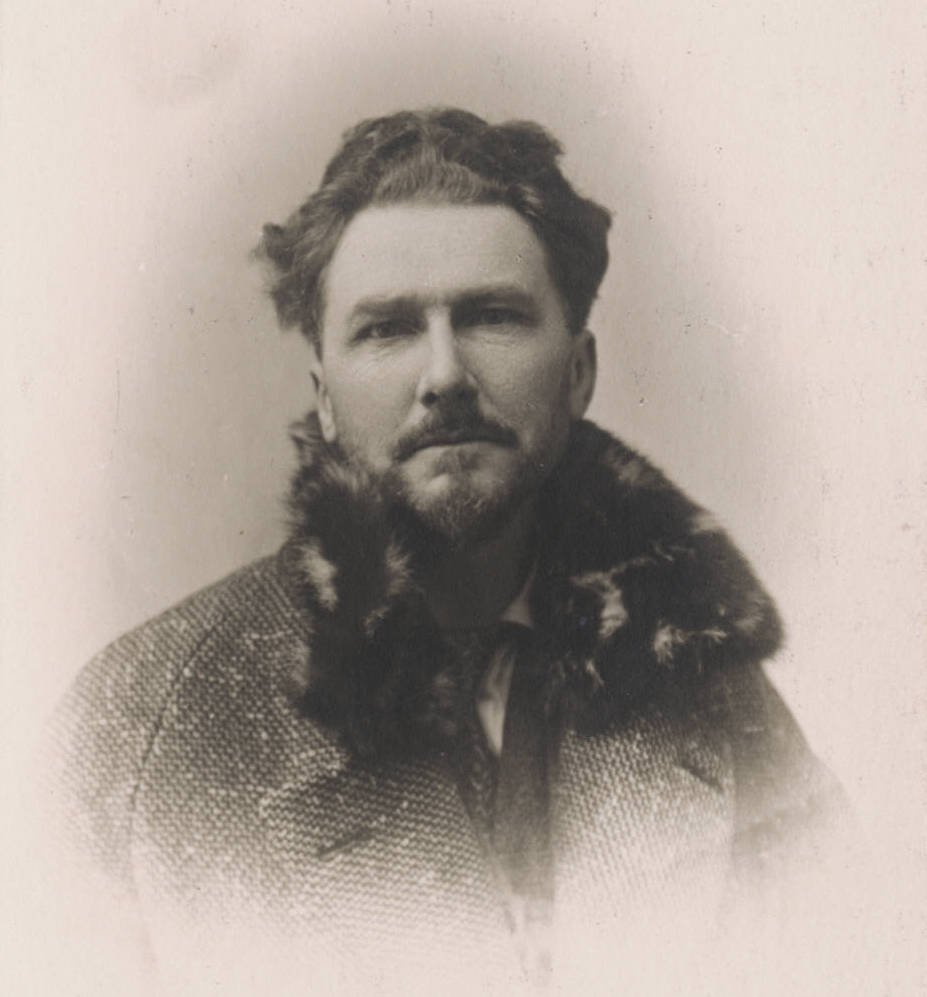
Ezra Pound c. 1920

The expatriate American poet Ezra Pound recorded or composed hundreds of broadcasts in support of fascism for Italian radio during World War II and the Holocaust in Italy. Based in Italy since 1924, Pound collaborated with the fascist regime of Benito Mussolini and expressed support for Adolf Hitler. Written at first for EIAR (Radio Rome, the public broadcaster), and later for a new radio station in the Salò Republic, a Nazi puppet state in northern Italy, the broadcasts contained deeply antisemitic and racist material. They were transmitted to England, central Europe, and the United States, mostly in English, but also in Italian, German, and French.

Calling himself "Dr Ezra Pound", Pound referred to Jews as "filth". He praised Adolf Hitler's Mein Kampf, recommended eugenics to "conserve the BEST of the race", and said the melting pot in America was "lost". He complained about "Mr. Churchill and that brute Rosefield [President Franklin Roosevelt] and their kike postal spies and obstructors". When he learned that the Nazis in Italy were rounding up Jews, he suggested that book stores showcase The Protocols of the Elders of Zion (1903), a hoax document purporting to be a Jewish plan to dominate the world. He wrote: "The arrest of Jews will create a wave of useless mercy; thus the need to disseminate the Protocols."

The broadcasts were monitored by the United States Foreign Broadcast Monitoring Service, and on 26 July 1943 the District Court of the United States for the District of Columbia indicted Pound in absentia for treason. Pound continued to broadcast for the fascists until shortly before his arrest by American forces in Italy on 3 May 1945. He spent over 12 years in St. Elizabeth's Hospital, a psychiatric facility in Washington, D.C., until his release in May 1958. He died and was buried in Italy in 1972.

== Background ==
=== Antisemitism, economic theories ===
Born in 1885 in Hailey, Idaho, and raised in Pennsylvania, Pound moved to Europe in 1908, living in London and Paris, then from 1924 in the coastal town of Rapallo, northern Italy. Pound's antisemitism can be traced to around 1910, when he wrote in Patria Mia—an essay about America—that Anglo-Saxons had been "submerged and well nigh lost in the pool of the races which have followed them" and that "[t]he Jew alone can retain his detestable qualities, despite climatic conditions." (Note: This was included in the 1912 serialized version of Patria Mia but was omitted in later editions.) Throughout the teens and early 1920s, according to Robert Casillo, Pound's poetry and prose singled out Jews. In 1922 he reportedly disliked that so many Jews were contributing to The Dial. In 1927 he called Marcel Proust "a vicious little Jew, picking up everything he can find and everything he can remember".

From 1911 until 1921, Pound contributed to The New Age, a socialist journal in London run by A. R. Orage. He came to believe that capitalism had caused World War I. In 1918 he met C. H. Douglas in the New Age office and became interested in Douglas's ideas about social credit, a halfway house between capitalism and socialism. It was within this New Age environment, according to Tim Redman, that Pound encountered antisemitic ideas about finance capitalism, which he called "usury" or "Jew usury".

=== Meeting Mussolini ===
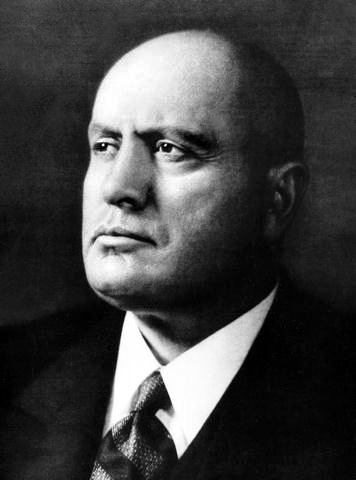
Benito Mussolini

Pound and his wife, Dorothy Shakespear, moved to Italy in 1924, where Pound supported the fascism of Benito Mussolini, prime minister of Italy from 1922 to 1943. Pound's mistress, Olga Rudge, a violinist, played privately for Mussolini in 1927. On 30 January 1933 Pound himself met Mussolini at the Palazzo Venezia in Rome. He gave Mussolini a copy of A Draft of XXX Cantos and, according to John Tytell, attempted to hand him a digest of his economic ideas. That he had met the prime minister made Pound feel he had become a person of influence. He began writing The ABC of Economics (1933) and Jefferson and/or Mussolini (1935), and wrote articles praising Mussolini and fascism for T. S. Eliot's literary magazine The Criterion in July 1933 and for the New York World Telegram in November. He wrote over 1,000 letters a year during the 1930s and presented his ideas about fascism and economics in hundreds of articles, as well as in his epic poem, The Cantos.

=== Jews in Italy ===
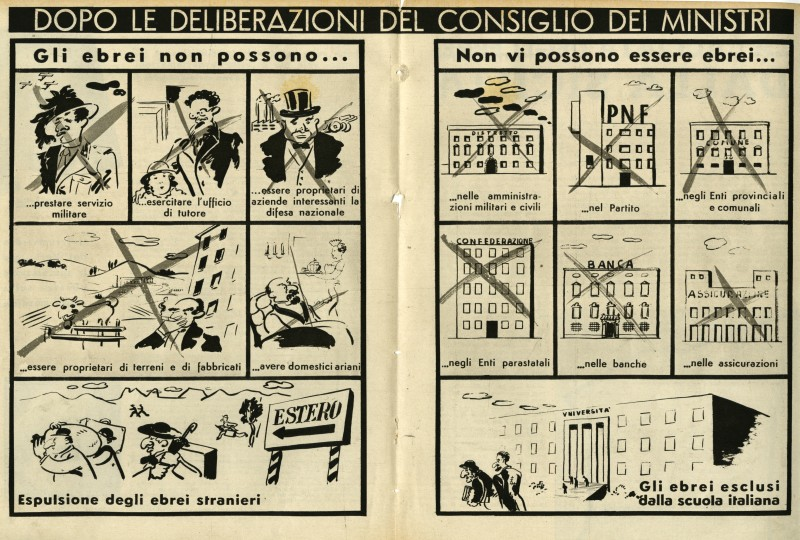
Cartoon showing restrictions on Jews in Italy, November 1938

Pound's respect for Mussolini increased when the latter introduced Italy's racial laws in November 1938. The laws were preceded in July by the publication of the Manifesto of Race, and in September Mussolini declared Judaism "an irreconcilable enemy of fascism". The new laws required Italian Jews to register with the police. They were not allowed to marry Christians, join the Army, or employ Christian (or "Italian Aryan") domestic help. Separate schools were established for Jewish children. Foreign Jews were stripped of their Italian citizenship.

On 9–10 September 1943, the German Wehrmacht occupied the northern and central areas of Italy. Hitler appointed Mussolini head of a fascist puppet state known as the Republica Sociale Italiana or Salò Republic. SS officers from RSHA IV B4, a Gestapo unit, arrived from Berlin to begin concentrating Jews in transit camps before deporting them to Auschwitz-Birkenau, the German extermination camp in occupied Poland. The first group of 1,034 Jews arrived in Auschwitz from Rome on 23 October 1943; 839 were gassed. According to the United States Holocaust Memorial Museum, Italians for the most part did not cooperate with the Germans, and as a result most Italian Jews, over 40,000, survived the Holocaust. Around 8,500 were deported to Auschwitz.

== Broadcasts ==
=== Initial approach ===
Pound's wartime broadcasts began after he approached the Italian Ministry of Popular Culture on 15 November 1940. He asked to speak to someone about "some of his methods" at "fighting anti-Italian and anti-Fascist propaganda in Europe, in Japan, in China and in the United States". The Ministry sent telegraphs asking for information about Pound, including about his "racial background", to the Italian Embassy in Washington, the Ministry of Foreign Affairs, the Ministry of the Interior, and the Ministry of War.

His first broadcast was on 23 January 1941, apparently before the Ministry had received responses. The Italian Embassy replied on 26 February 1941 that Pound was "of Aryan Race", and that he had "displayed his friendly feelings for Fascism and granted courageous interviews” and his "recent broadcasts from Italy were [the] subject of vital interest and considered to be very efficacious." Robert Corrigan writes that in a memo dated 5 March 1941 the Inspector for Broadcasting and Television told the Chief of the Cabinet of the Ministry of Popular Culture that he would "entrust Ezra Pound with the wording of at least five conferences per month besides the drawing up of two political notes each week".

=== Radio Rome ===
Radio broadcast

You let in the Jew and the Jew rotted your empire, and you yourselves out-Jewed the Jew. ... And the big Jew has rotted EVERY nation he has wormed into.

— Ezra Pound, Radio Rome, 15 March 1942

According to Tytell, Pound's voice had assumed a "rasping, buzzing quality like the sound of a hornet stuck in a jar". In the broadcasts, Pound attacked the United States, Roosevelt, Roosevelt's family, Churchill, and the Jews. He praised Hitler's Mein Kampf and recommended eugenics to "conserve the best of the race". In 110 scripts examined by Leonard W. Doob, powerful Jews were mentioned in 71 scripts, Roosevelt in 50, Churchill in 37, Jews in general in 35, and Hitler in 18.

In October 1941, Pound complained about "Mr. Churchill and that brute Rosefield and their kike postal spies and obstructors". He told England in March 1942: "For two centuries, ever since the brute Cromwell brought 'em back into England, the kikes have sucked out your vitals." "No Sassoon is an Englishman, racially. No Rothschild is English, no Strakosch is English, no Roosevelt is English ... And it is for this filth that you fight." On 8 May 1943: "Until England and America delouse, and get rid of her Jew gangs, there is no place for either England or the United States in the new world at all."

Pound traveled to Rome for one week every month to pre-record the 10-minute broadcasts, which were broadcast every three days. From 23 January 1941 he recorded or composed hundreds, and possibly thousands, of them, mostly for The American Hour on Radio Rome. He called himself "Dr Ezra Pound" or used a pseudonym: "American Imperialist", "Manlio Squarcio", "Mr Dooley", "Piero Mazda", "Marco Veneziano", "Bruce Bairnsfather", "Langdon Billings", or "Julian Bingham". Broadcast in English, and sometimes in Italian, German, and French, The American Hour was transmitted mainly to England, central Europe, and the United States.

=== Salò Republic radio station ===
Italian Social Republic, September 1943 – May 1945

On or around 23 November 1943, Pound met government officials in Salò, including Fernando Mezzasoma, the new Minister of Popular Culture. Pound wrote from Salò to Dorothy asking if she could obtain a radio confiscated from the Jews to give to Olga, so that Olga could help with his work. He met more officials in Milan, and from 1 December he began writing scripts for the state's new radio station. He would send the scripts to Carl Goedel in the German Embassy in Milan, although he insisted that he was working for, and being paid by, the "Republican Fascist Ministry of Popular Culture", not the Germans.

On 2 December 1943, Pound wrote to Alessandro Pavolini, secretary of the Republican Fascist Party, suggesting that book stores be legally obliged to showcase certain books, including The Protocols of the Elders of Zion (1903), a hoax document purporting to be a Jewish plan to dominate the world. Pound wrote: "The arrest of Jews will create a wave of useless mercy [un'ondata di misericordia inservibile]; thus the need to disseminate the Protocols. The intellectuals are capable of a passion more durable than emotional, but they need to understand the reasons for a conflict." (Note: The other books Pound wanted to have showcased were Giuseppe Mazzini's The Duties of Man; Aristotle's Politics; and the Testament of Confucius.)

In May 1944, the German military, trying to secure the coast against the Allies, forced Ezra and Dorothy to evacuate their seafront apartment in Rapallo. The couple moved in with Pound's mistress, who lived nearby. According to her, Ezra and Dorothy would spend their nights listening to the BBC. After hearing a BBC broadcast in March 1944, Pound had proposed broadcasting short speeches of his to America under the title "London lies".

Most of Pound's radio scripts for the Salò Republic were written for a program called Jerry's Front Calling. One script recommended the execution of Galeazzo Ciano, who was on trial for having betrayed Mussolini. On 26 January 1945, in a script called "Corpses of Course", Pound wrote that the Jews wanted to start a third world war to "keep the goys fighting, and let the jews hold coats and pick pockets while the row is in progress". He added: "Why shouldn't there be one grand beano; wiping out Sieff and Kuhn and Loeb and Guggenheim and Stinkenfinger and the rest of the nazal bleaters?"

=== Payment ===
According to Matthew Feldman, the Pound archives at Yale University contain receipts for 195 payments from the Italian Ministry of Popular Culture from 22 April 1941 to 26 January 1944. In total, Pound received $12,500; Feldman writes that this would have had the purchasing power of $185,000 in 2013. Pound was also allowed to pay a reduced fare on the railways, and (until May 1944) to stay in his Rapallo seaside home; American citizens were otherwise not allowed to live in coastal towns because the countries were at war. He was also allowed to retain his safety deposit boxes and bank accounts, because, the Ministry said, of his "truly friendly feelings for Italy and that he collaborates with the broadcasting of propaganda to foreign countries".

== Indictment ==
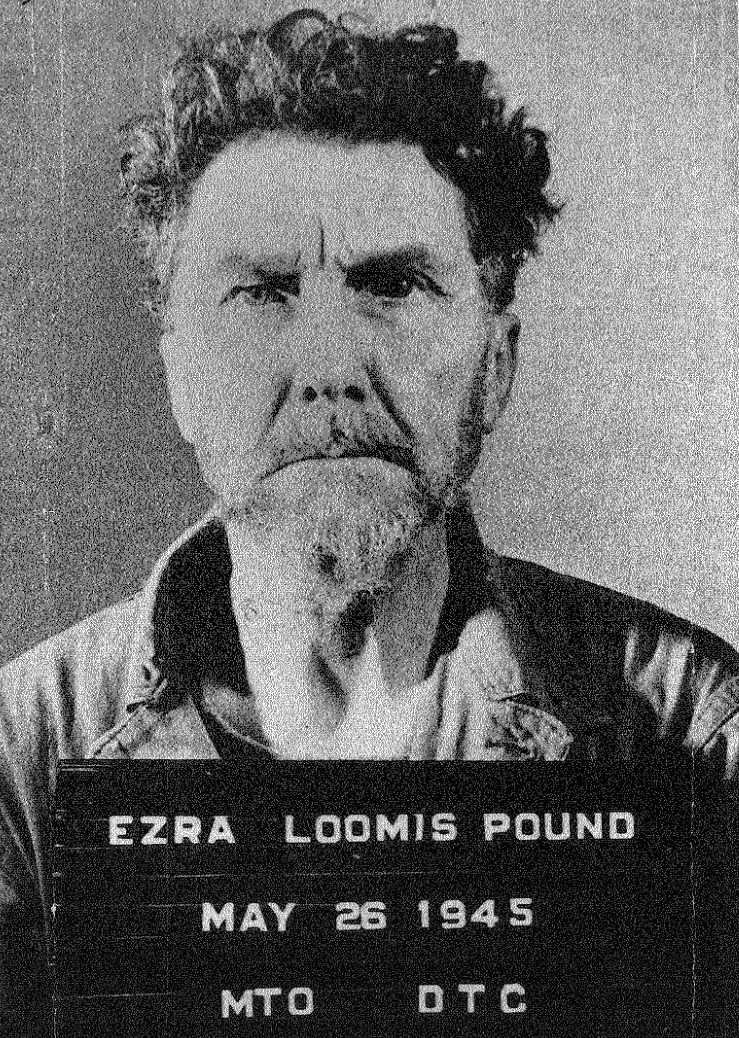
Pound on 26 May 1945

The broadcasts were monitored by the United States Foreign Broadcast Monitoring Service, and on 26 July 1943 the United States District Court for the District of Columbia indicted Pound in absentia for treason. On 28 April 1945, Italian partisans shot Mussolini and his mistress and left their bodies on display in the Piazzale Loreto in Milan. On 3 May armed partisans arrived at Pound's mistress's home and took him into custody before transferring him to the U.S. Counter Intelligence Corps headquarters in Genoa.

Pound wanted to make a final broadcast called "Ashes of Europe Calling", in which he would recommend peace with Japan, American management of Italy, the establishment of a Jewish state in Palestine, and leniency toward Germany. On 8 May, the day Germany surrendered, he told an American reporter, Edd Johnson, that Mussolini was "a very human, imperfect character who lost his head" and that Hitler was "a Jeanne d'Arc, a saint ... a martyr. Like many martyrs, he held extreme views."

On 27 November 1945 Pound was arraigned in Washington, D.C., on charges of treason. He was placed in the psychiatric ward of Gallinger Hospital on 4 December, then transferred on 21 December to St. Elizabeths Hospital. His lawyer convinced the court that Pound was unable to defend himself, and he spent the next 12 years in St. Elizabeths. After his release on 7 May 1958, as a result of a campaign by his friends, he returned to live in Italy. He died in November 1972, aged 87, in hospital in Venice.

== Sources ==
=== Works cited ===
- Barnhisel, Greg (September 1998). "'Hitch Your Wagon to a Star': The Square Dollar Series and Ezra Pound". The Papers of the Bibliographical Society of America. 92 (3): 273–295. doi:10.1086/pbsa.92.3.24304448. JSTOR 24304448. S2CID 111416528.
- Carpenter, Humphrey (1988). A Serious Character: The Life of Ezra Pound. Boston: Houghton Mifflin. ISBN 978-0-395-41678-5
- Casillo, Robert (1988). The Genealogy of Demons: Anti-Semitism, Fascism, and the Myths of Ezra Pound. Evanston: Northwestern University Press. ISBN 0-8101-0710-4
- Corrigan, Robert A. (1972). "Ezra Pound and the Italian Ministry for Popular Culture". The Journal of Popular Culture. V(4): 767–781. doi:10.1111/j.0022-3840.1972.0504_767.x
- Czech, Danuta (2000). "A Calendar of the Most Important Events in the History of the Auschwitz Concentration Camp". In Długoborski, Wacław; Piper, Franciszek (eds.). Auschwitz, 1940–1945. Central Issues in the History of the Camp. Vol. V: Epilogue. Oświęcim: Auschwitz-Birkenau State Museum. pp. 119–231. ISBN 978-8385047872.
- Doob, Leonard W., ed. (1978). 'Ezra Pound Speaking': Radio Speeches of World War II. Westport, CT and London: Greenwood Press. ISBN 0-313-20057-2.
- Feldman, Matthew (2013). Ezra Pound's Fascist Propaganda, 1935–45. New York: Palgrave Macmillan. ISBN 978-1-137-34551-6
- Hadjiyiannis, Christos (Fall 2015). "We Need to Talk About Ezra: Ezra Pound's Fascist Propaganda, 1935–45 (review)". Journal of Modern Literature. 39 (1): 112–126. doi:10.2979/jmodelite.39.1.112. S2CID 159997010.
- Houen, Alex (2002). "Ezra Pound: Anti-Semitism, Segregationism, and the 'Arsenal of Live Thought'". Terrorism and Modern Literature: From Joseph Conrad to Ciaran Carson. Oxford: Oxford University Press. ISBN 978-0191541988.
- Johnson, Edd (9 May 1945). "Confucius and Kindred Subjects/Pound, Accused of Treason, Calls Hitler, Saint, Martyr". Chicago Sun. Also in Philadelphia Record as "Poet-Prisoner Pound Calls Hitler Saint".
- McCraw, William (Fall 1986). "Fascist of the Last Hour". San José Studies. XII(3), 46–57.
- Moody, A. David (2007). Ezra Pound: Poet. A Portrait of the Man and His Work. I: The Young Genius 1885–1920. Oxford: Oxford University Press. ISBN 978-0-19-957146-8
- Moody, A. David (2015). Ezra Pound: Poet. A Portrait of the Man and His Work. III: The Tragic Years 1939–1972. Oxford: Oxford University Press. ISBN 978-0-19-870436-2
- Johns, Orrick (1973). Time of our lives: the story of my father and myself. New York: Octagon Books.
- Preda, Roxana (2005b). "Economics: Usury". In Demetres P. Tryphonopoulos and Stephen Adams (eds.) The Ezra Pound Encyclopedia. Westport, CT: Greenwood, 89–90. ISBN 978-0-313-30448-4
- Redman, Tim (1991). Ezra Pound and Italian Fascism. Cambridge: Cambridge University Press. ISBN 978-0-521-37305-0
- Sarfatti, Michele (2006). The Jews in Mussolini's Italy: From Equality to Persecution. Madison, WI: The University of Wisconsin Press. ISBN 978-0299217341
- Sieburth, Richard (ed.) (2003b). "Introduction". The Pisan Cantos. New York: New Directions. ISBN 978-0-8112-1558-9
- Surrette, Leon (1999). Pound in Purgatory: From Economic Radicalism to Anti-Semitism. Urbana, IL: University of Illinois Press. ISBN 978-0-252-02498-6.
- Swift, Daniel (2017). The Bughouse: The Poetry, Politics, and Madness of Ezra Pound. New York: Farrar, Straus and Giroux. ISBN 978-0-374-28404-6
- Torrey, Edwin Fuller (1992) [1984]. The Roots of Treason and the Secrets of St Elizabeths. Bethesda, MD: Lucas Books. ISBN 1-929636-01-6
- Tytell, John (1987). Ezra Pound: The Solitary Volcano. New York: Anchor Press/Doubleday. ISBN 0-385-19694-6
- United States Department of Justice. "Pound radio broadcasts" (PDF).
