= Omar Pound =

Anglo-American writer, teacher, and translator (1926–2010)

- Born: Omar Shakespear Pound; 10 September 1926; Paris, France
- Died: 2 March 2010 (aged 83); Princeton, New Jersey, U.S.
- Education: Hamilton College (BA); London School of Oriental and African Studies; McGill University (MA)
- Occupations: Writer, teacher, translator
- Spouse: Elizabeth Stevenson Parkin
- Children: 2
- Parent(s): Ezra Pound and Dorothy Shakespear

Omar Shakespear Pound (10 September 1926 – 2 March 2010) was an Anglo-American writer, teacher, and translator. The son of Ezra Pound and his wife Dorothy Shakespear, Pound was the author of Arabic & Persian Poems (1970) and co-author of Wyndham Lewis: A Descriptive Bibliography (1978). He also wrote poems of his own and published material about his parents.

== Early life and education ==
Omar was born in the American Hospital of Paris, the son of poet Ezra Pound and his wife artist Dorothy Shakespear, who were living in Italy at the time. The couple had been in Paris since May for the concert performance of an opera Ezra had written with two musicians, and had stayed on in Paris because Dorothy wanted the baby to be born at the American Hospital. Ernest Hemingway, who lived in Paris and was a friend of the Pounds, drove her there for the birth. Ezra signed the birth certificate the following day at the local town hall in Neuilly and wrote to his father, "next generation (male) arrived. Both D & it appear to be doing well." Omar was born 14 months after his half-sister Maria, later known as Mary de Rachewiltz, the daughter of Ezra and his mistress, violinist Olga Rudge.

Dorothy took Omar to London when he was 18 months old, where she stayed for a year, then left him in the care of his maternal grandmother, Olivia Shakespear. He was sent to live in the Norland Institute, which trains nannies and used to look after young children for parents who were overseas. Ezra's parents visited Omar there in 1931. Omar lived there until 1933 before moving to the home of Ruth Ethel Dickie, the former matron of Norland, in Felpham, Sussex. In 1933 he attended a Montessori School, also in Sussex, then a local prep school. When Olivia Shakespear died in 1938, Omar met his father for the first time; Ezra was in London settling Olivia's affairs. In 1940 Omar became a boarder at Charterhouse School. He survived a bombing during World War II and the London Blitz.

== Career and writing ==
=== Military service ===
After leaving Charterhouse in 1942 to train in hotel management, Pound volunteered for the U.S. Army in 1945 and served in France and Germany. He travelled to Italy looking for his father when Ezra was arrested there for treason in 1945, although he was not able to see him, and he visited his father briefly that year when Ezra was held in St. Elizabeths psychiatric hospital in Washington, D.C. He was present during one of the subsequent court hearings.

=== Teaching and later education ===
Later Pound attended Hamilton College in New York, his father's alma mater, where he studied anthropology and French, graduating in 1954 with a Bachelor of Arts (BA) degree. He also studied Persian and Islamic history at the School of Oriental and African Studies in London, and in 1958 he received a Master of Arts (MA) degree in Islamic Studies from McGill University in Montreal.

Pound taught at the Roxbury Latin School in Boston; the American School of Tangier, which he headed in 2007, the Cambridgeshire College of Arts and Technology; and from 1980 Princeton University.

=== Writing ===
Pound is the author of Arabic & Persian Poems (1970) and co-author of Wyndham Lewis: A Descriptive Bibliography (1978). He was also a founding trustee of the Wyndham Lewis Memorial Trust. His own poetry was published in The Dying Sorcerer (1985), Pissle and the Holy Grail (1987), Poems Inside and Out (1999), Watching the Worlds Go By (2001), and in literary magazines. He also published material about his parents, including Ezra Pound and Dorothy Shakespear, Their Letters 1908–1914 (1984) and Ezra and Dorothy Pound: Letters in Captivity, 1945–1946 (1999). His papers and correspondence are kept in the collections of the Hamilton College library.

== Personal life ==
Pound married Elizabeth Stevenson Parkin in 1955, and they had two children, Katherine Shakespear Pound and Oriana Davenport Pound. In his biographical entry in Contemporary Authors, Pound listed both his politics and his religion as "nil". He clarified in an interview that he considered himself "fundamentally a mystic", adding "Even saying one doesn't have a religion is an acceptance of the mysteries of life, and I think acceptance of mysteries gives one a sense of wonder." Pound died aged 83 in Princeton, New Jersey.

== Selected works ==
- (1970). Arabic & Persian Poems. London: Fulcrum Press. OCLC 630883271
- (1970). Kano. Birmingham: Migrant Press. OCLC 931419827
- (1978) with Philip Grover. Wyndham Lewis: A Descriptive Bibliography. Folkestone: Dawson. OCLC 905668727
- (1985). The Dying Sorcerer: Poems. Antigonish, Nova Scotia: Tarlane Editions. OCLC 30909459
- (1984). Ezra Pound and Dorothy Shakespear, Their Letters 1908–1914. New York: New Directions Publishing Corporation. OCLC 1111743465
- (1984). Siege Lucknow, 1857. Revere, PA: Woolmer/Brotherson. OCLC 11630566
- (1987). Pissle and the Holy Grail. Revere, PA: Woolmer/Brotherson. OCLC 15540867
- (1988) with Robert Spoo. Ezra Pound and Margaret Cravens: A Tragic Friendship, 1910–1912. Durham: Duke University Press. OCLC 906513655
- (1989). Gorby and the Rats. Fayetteville: University of Arkansas Press. OCLC 643396194
- (1998). The Countess at the Bar. London: The Strawberry Press. OCLC 1049146048
- (1999). Poems Inside & Out. Nacogdoches, TX: LaNana Creek Press. OCLC 43368773
- (1999) with Robert Spoo. Ezra and Dorothy Pound: Letters in Captivity, 1945–1946. Oxford: Oxford University Press. OCLC 42835104
- (2001). Watching the Worlds Go By: Selected Poems. Spring, TX: Panther Creek Press. OCLC 316782307
