= Mary Shakespear =

Mary Shakespear may refer to:

- Dorothy Shakespear (1886–1973), also known as Mary, English artist
- Mary Shakespeare (c. 1537—1608), English mother of William Shakespeare
