= Mary de Rachewiltz =

Italian-American poet and translator (1925–2026)

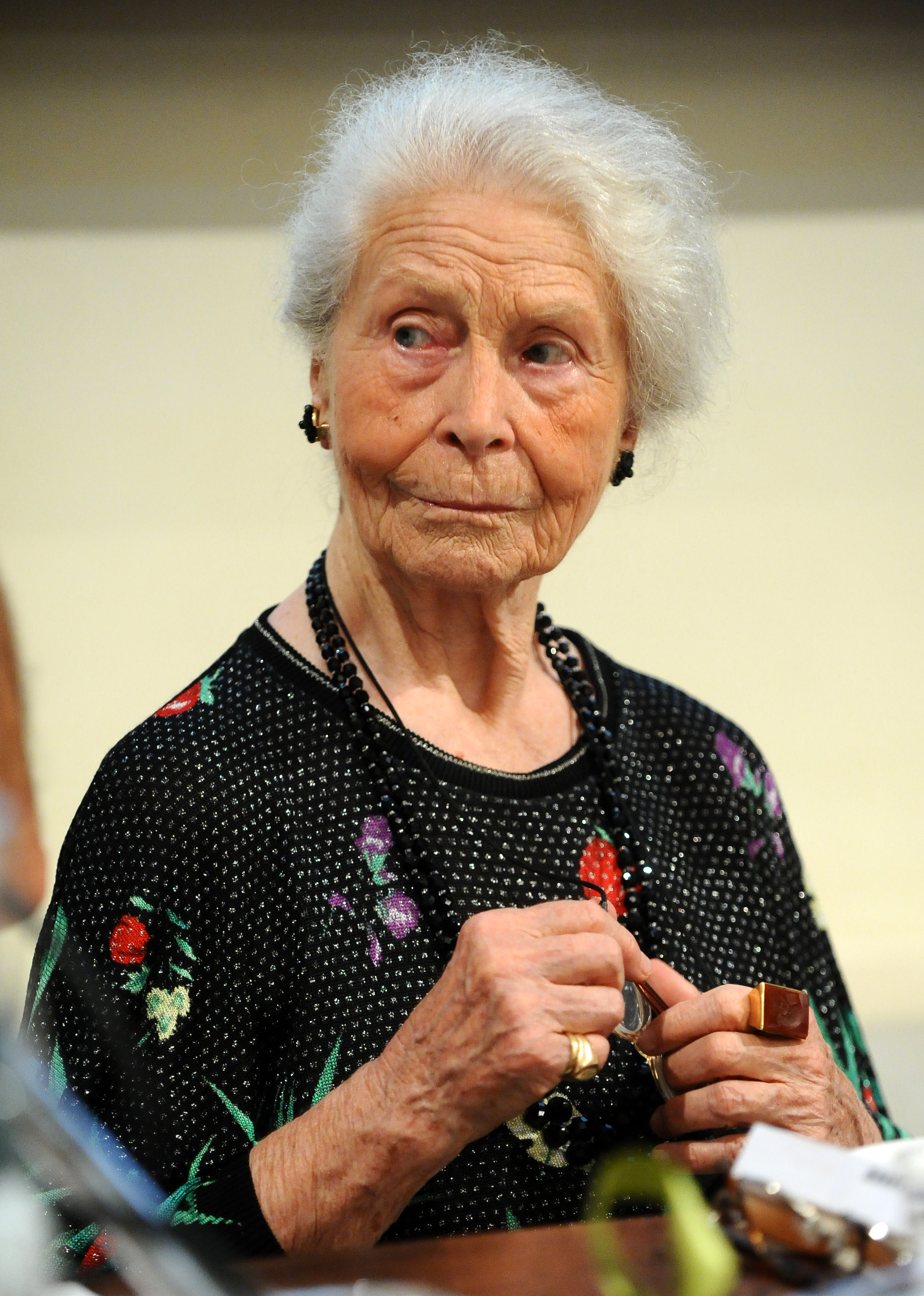
- Rachewiltz in 2012
- Born: Maria Rudge; July 9, 1925; Brixen, Kingdom of Italy
- Died: July 24, 2026 (aged 101); Merano, South Tyrol, Italy
- Occupations: Poet, translator
- Parents: Ezra Pound; Olga Rudge

Mary de Rachewiltz (born Maria Rudge, July 9, 1925 – July 24, 2026) was an Italian-American poet and translator. She was the daughter of the American poet Ezra Pound, whose Cantos she translated into Italian. Her childhood memoir Discretions was published in 1971.

== Early life and education ==
Mary de Rachewiltz was born Maria Rudge in Brixen, Italy, on July 9, 1925, the daughter of Olga Rudge, a classical violinist, and Ezra Pound, who was married to Dorothy Shakespear. Her mother placed the girl in the care of a peasant couple after her birth; she was raised on their farm in Gais in the Italian Tyrol. She grew up on a farm speaking the local dialect of German, but when she was older, she began to join her mother, and sometimes Pound, at Olga's house in Venice. There Maria was exposed to a world of culture, literature, and politics. In the Tyrolean village, she had access to only two books, but when with her parents, she made full use of a large library, was expected to speak Italian and wear white gloves. As a teenager, she moved away from the mountains and at that point, Pound took her education in hand. During World War II while Pound was making fascist radio broadcasts for Rome radio, he simultaneously took time to teach his daughter literature, telling her "I can only teach you the profession I know."

== Middle years ==
During World War II Olga lost possession of her home in Venice, and Maria moved for a period with her mother to Rapallo. She was later sent back to Gais when Pound brought his legal wife, Dorothy Shakespear, to live with Olga for a period during the war. During this time, Rudge worked in a German hospital in Italy. She was 19 when her father finally told her about his other family: his wife Shakespear and son Omar, Maria's half-brother. When she returned to Rapallo, she found her father had been arrested by U.S. authorities on treason charges because of his wartime broadcasts; he was being held at the "Disciplinary Training Centre" in Pisa. Pound was taken from Pisa to the U.S., where he was found mentally incompetent for trial. He was committed for the next 12 years at St. Elizabeths Hospital, where he continued to intermittently write, and receive his wife, friends and literary visitors. On his release Pound returned to Italy. He lived for a period with Mary and her family at their estate, castle Brunnenburg.

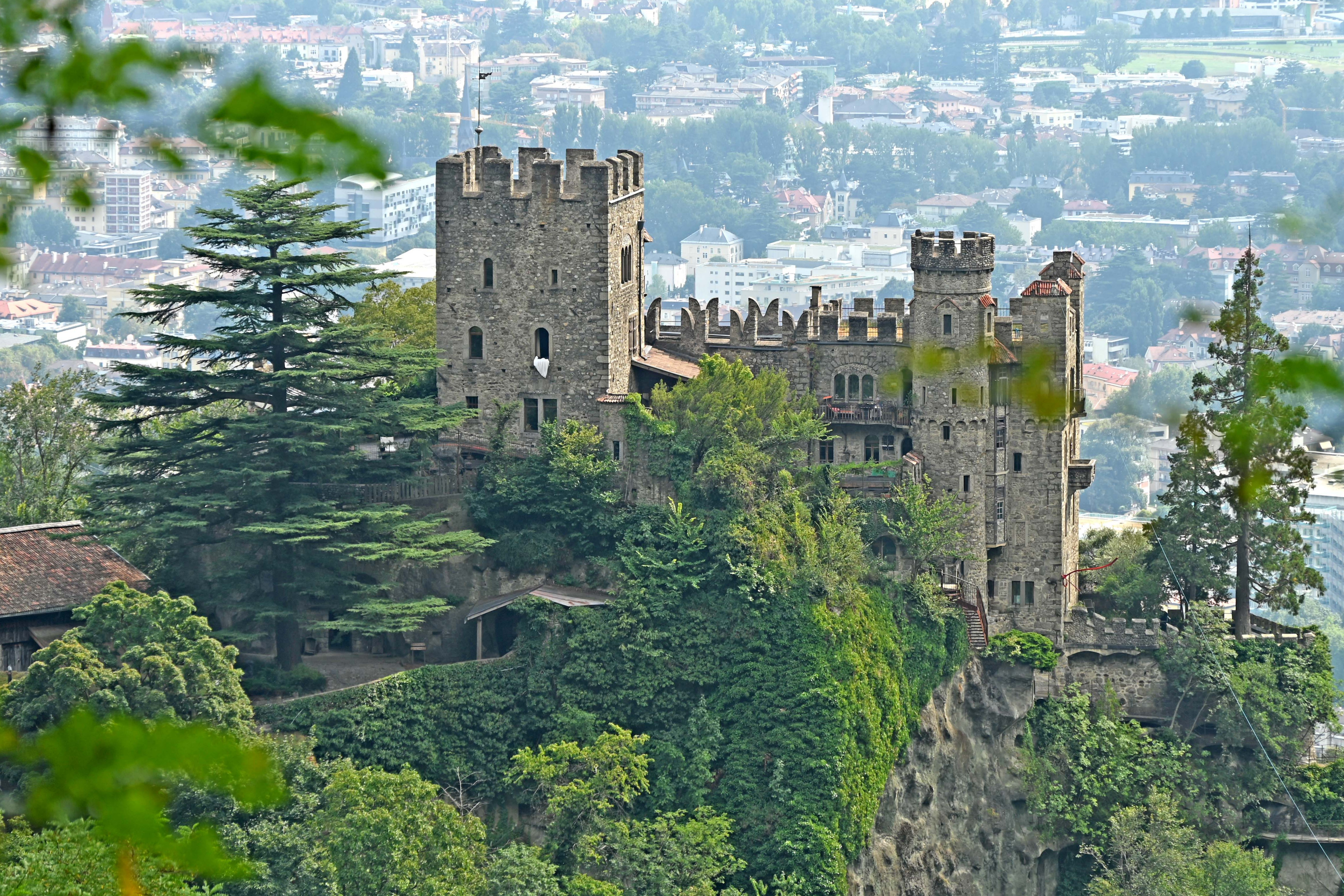
Mary de Rachewiltz and her husband Boris de Rachewiltz bought and renovated Brunnenburg castle in the Italian Tyrol

In 1946, Mary had married Egyptologist Boris de Rachewiltz. A son was born the next year, followed by a daughter two years later. They bought and renovated their residence, Brunnenburg castle in the Italian Tyrol. She published an autobiography, Discretions, in 1971. The following year, her father died in Venice.

In the 1980s Rachewiltz published the first dual-language edition of her father's epic poem The Cantos, which he began work on in the years before 1915 and continued throughout his life until his death. She won the Città di Monselice award in 1986 for the translation of this poem into Italian. She was the curator of the Ezra Pound Archive, Centre for the Study of Ezra Pound and His Contemporaries at the Beinecke Rare Book and Manuscript Library held at Yale University. Rachewiltz studied at Radcliffe College between 1973 and 1975. She has presented lectures about her father's work and modernist poetry throughout the U.S. and Canada.

== Later life and death ==
Rachewiltz collected and co-edited with biographer David Moody, her father's letters written to his parents, published in 2011 as Ezra Pound to His Parents. As of 2012, she continued to live at the Brunnenburg. She taught a class on her father's literature for the Brunnenburg exchange program, in which several American universities participated. Rachewiltz collaborated with the Italian artist Rosetta Berardi for her project entitled Biblioteca Minima.

Rachewiltz is the subject of the 2023 biography Let the Wind Speak: Mary de Rachewiltz and Ezra Pound, written by Carol Loeb Shloss. Her own Italian-language poems were collected in the volume Processo in verso. Tutte le poesie italiane, edited by Massimo Bacigalupo and published by Bertoni Editore in 2024.

On the occasion of her centenary, two monographic volumes were dedicated to her: Tenera è la vestale and In quel "tu" di luce, both edited by Paolo Pera and published by Bertoni Editore. The aim of these works was to highlight her Italian-language poetry, which had been overlooked for far too many years.

Rachewiltz turned 100 on July 9, 2025, and died in Merano, South Tyrol, on July 24, 2026.

== Works ==
Rachewiltz's works include:

- Maschere tirolesi (1957)
- Il Natale. Antologia di poeti del '900' (1961)
- Il diapason (1965)
- Di riflesso (1966)
- Discretions (Discrezioni. Storia di un'educazione) (1971)
- Per conoscere Pound (1989)
- Riflessione (1994)
- Polittico. Poesie 1985–1995 (1996)
- Radiando lui cagiona (1998)
- Whose World?, Saint Andrews College Press (1998).
- For the Wrong Reason, Edgewise Press (2002).
- Canzoniere, Raffaelli Editore (2004).
- L'economia amorosa, Coup d'Idée (2018)
- Processo in verso. Tutte le poesie italiane (2024)

Translations of works by Ezra Pound

- Catai (1959)
- Alcuni Nobili Drammi dal Giappone: da Manoscritti di Ernest Fenellosa, scelti e finiti da Ezra Pound (1961)
- II Teatro Giapponese No di Ernest Fenellosa e Ezra Pound (1966)
- Opere Scelte (1970)
- Cantos Scelti (1973)
- Le Nuvole di Pisa (1973)
- I Cantos (1985)
