= Discretion (disambiguation) =

Discretion is the ability to act or make a decision according to one's own choice.

Discretion may also refer to:

- Judicial discretion, the power of the judiciary to make some decisions according to their discretion
- "Discretion," a song by Pedro the Lion from the album Achilles Heel
- Discretion (album), an album by saxophonist Tim Berne's Bloodcount

== See also ==
- Discretions
