= Jefferson and/or Mussolini =

1935 book by Ezra Pound

Jefferson and/or Mussolini: L'Idea Statale Fascism as I Have Seen It
- Author: Ezra Pound
- Language: English
- Publisher: Stanley Nott Ltd
- Publication date: 1935
- Publication place: United Kingdom

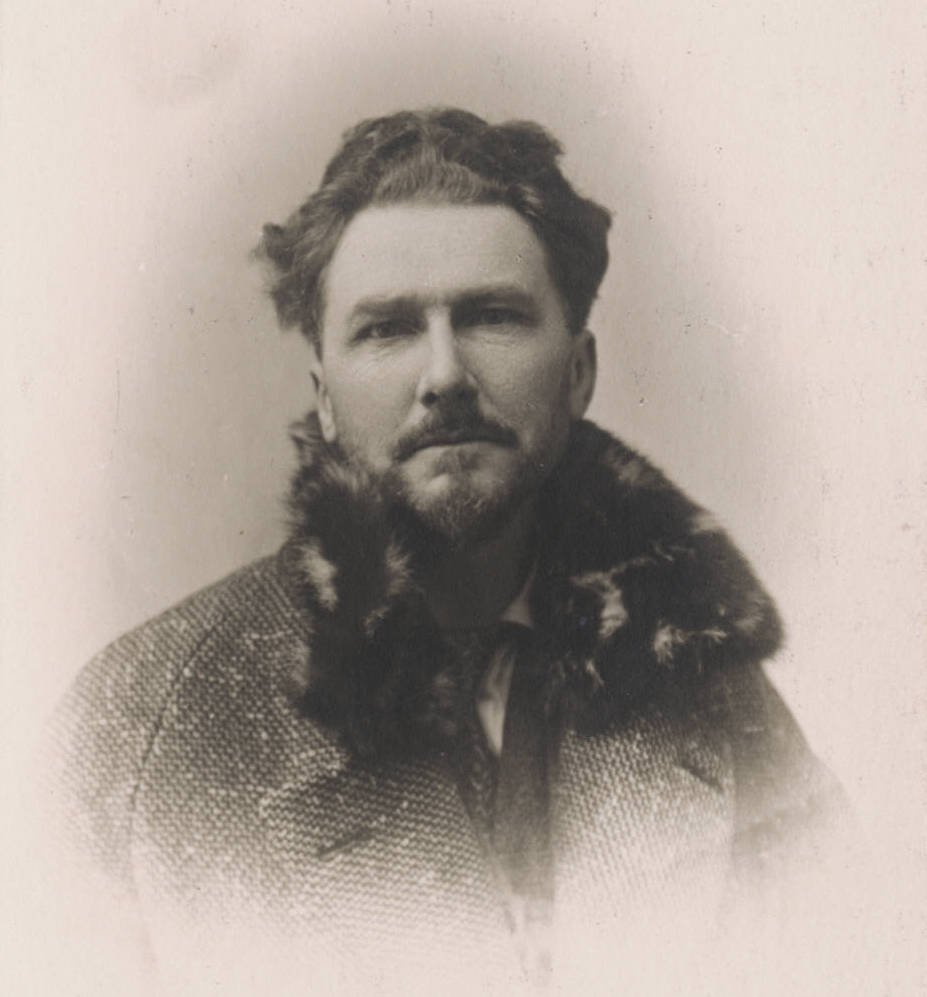
Ezra Pound (1885–1972), c. 1920

Jefferson and/or Mussolini: L'Idea Statale Fascism as I Have Seen It is a book by the American Ezra Pound. It was first published in 1935 by Stanley Nott Ltd in London.

The book compares Benito Mussolini, then Prime Minister of Italy and leader of the National Fascist Party, to Thomas Jefferson, third President of the United States. Pound, who lived from 1924 in Rapallo, Italy, wrote the book shortly after meeting Mussolini on 30 January 1933. His agent had the manuscript by the end of February.

Pound argues that "[t]he fundamental likenesses between these two men are probably greater than their difference." Pound had trouble finding a publisher. In the book's foreword he writes:

April 1935, Anno XIII, finally a foreword.

The body of this MS was written and left my hands in February 1933. 40 publishers have refused it. No typescript of mine has been read by so many people or brought me a more interesting correspondence. It is here printed verbatim, unaltered. I had not seen the MS from the time it left Rapallo till it returned here with the galley proof. It is printed as record of what I saw in February 1933. The September preface (1933) indicated a flutter of hope, that has grown steadily more fluttery and less hopeful.

== Works cited ==
- Moody, A. David (2014). Ezra Pound: Poet. A Portrait of the Man and His Work. II: The Epic Years 1921–1939. Oxford: Oxford University Press. ISBN 978-0-19-921558-4
- Pound, Ezra (1970) [1935]. Jefferson and/or Mussolini. New York: Liverright.
- Redman, Tim (1991). Ezra Pound and Italian Fascism. Cambridge: Cambridge University Press. ISBN 978-0-521-37305-0
