= Ripostes =

Book by Ezra Pound

Ripostes of Ezra Pound
- by Ezra Pound
- Illustrator: Dorothy Shakespear
- Country: London, England
- Publisher: Swift & Co.
- Publication date: October 1912

Ripostes of Ezra Pound is a collection of 25 poems by the American poet Ezra Pound, submitted to Swift and Co. in London in February 1912, and published by them in October that year. It was published in the United States in July 1913 by Small, Maynard and Co of Boston.

Ripostes is the first collection in which Pound moves toward the economy of language and clarity of imagery of the Imagism movement, and was the first time he used the word "Imagiste." Of its 25 poems, "Salve Pontifex" had appeared in A Lume Spento, and eight others had appeared in magazines. The book includes Pound's interpretation of the Old English poem "The Seafarer".
