= Olivia Shakespear =

British writer (1863–1938)

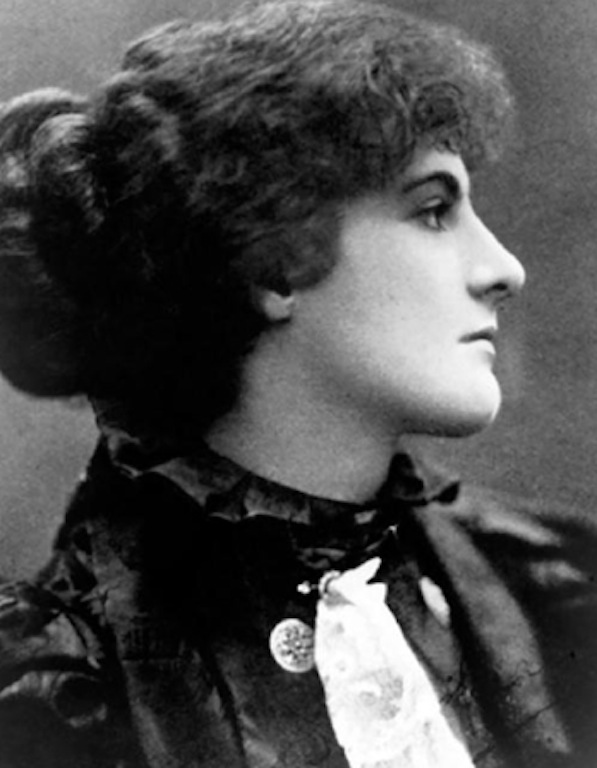
- Shakespear in 1897
- Born: Olivia Tucker; 17 March 1863; Isle of Wight, England
- Died: 3 October 1938 (aged 75); London, England
- Children: Dorothy Shakespear
- Relatives: Lionel Johnson; Omar Pound

Olivia Shakespear (née Tucker; 17 March 1863 – 3 October 1938) was a British novelist, playwright, and patron of the arts. She wrote six books that are described as "marriage problem" novels. Her works sold poorly, sometimes only a few hundred copies. Her last novel, Uncle Hilary, is considered her magnum opus. She wrote two plays in collaboration with Florence Farr.

Olivia was the daughter of a retired adjutant general, and had little formal education. She was well-read however, and developed a love of literature. In 1885 she married London barrister Henry Hope Shakespear, and in 1886 gave birth to their only child, Dorothy. In 1894 her literary interests led to a friendship with William Butler Yeats that became physically intimate in 1896. He declared that they "had many days of happiness" to come, but the affair ended in 1897. They nevertheless remained lifelong friends and corresponded frequently. On October 20, 1917, Yeats married Georgie Hyde-Lees, Olivia Shakespear's step-niece and Dorothy's best friend.

Olivia began hosting weekly salons frequented by Ezra Pound and other modernist writers and artists in 1909, and became influential in London literary society. Olivia's daughter Dorothy Shakespear married Pound in 1914, despite the less than enthusiastic blessing of her parents. After their marriage, Pound used funds received from Olivia to support T. S. Eliot and James Joyce. When Dorothy gave birth to a son, Omar Pound, in France in 1926, Olivia assumed guardianship of the boy. He lived with Olivia until her death twelve years later, in 1938.

== Early life and marriage ==
Olivia's father, Henry Tod Tucker, was born in Edinburgh and joined the British Indian Army as an ensign at age 16. He rose to the rank of Adjutant General in Bengal, but retired in 1856 at age 48 owing to ill health. Within a year of returning to Britain he married Harriet Johnson (b. 1821) of Bath. The couple moved to the Isle of Wight where their two daughters were born: Florence in 1858 and Olivia on 17 March 1863. Soon after they relocated to Sussex where their third child, Henry, was born in 1866. In 1877 the family moved to London and raised their daughters in a social world that encouraged the pursuit of leisure.

Olivia often visited her many Johnson relatives in the country, and became particularly fond of her cousin Lionel Johnson—the only one of many uncles and cousins not to join the military—who went on to become a poet and friend to W. B. Yeats. It is likely that Olivia received little formal education; she may have been educated by tutors, and appears to have become well-read as a young woman.

Olivia Shakespear, 1883

In 1885 Olivia married Henry Hope Shakespear, a man described by Terence Brown in The Life of W.B. Yeats: A Critical Biography as "worthy" but "dull". Born in India in 1849, he was descended from 17th-century East London ropemakers and, like Olivia, came from a military family.

Henry had attended Harrow, studied law, and joined a law practice in 1875. The couple married on 8 December 1885, and honeymooned in Boulogne and Paris. Olivia's father endowed them with a comfortable income in the form of a trust. Nine months after the wedding their only child, Dorothy, was born on 14 September 1886; Olivia realised soon that the marriage was devoid of passion. Yeats' biographer Alexander Jeffares writes, "she was unselfcentered, unselfish, deeply imaginative and sympathetic and, until she met Yeats, she seems to have accepted the fact of her unhappy loveless marriage".

Shakespear dissolved his legal partnership in the late 1880s—his partner may have been embezzling from clients' trusts—and formed his own practice. Harwood writes that Shakespear's attitude to the situation showed a certain amount of "timidity" on his part and a definite "dislike of scenes". During this period Olivia moved from socialising with military wives to literary women: Valentine Fox (unhappily married to a Kent brewer) and Pearl Craigie, a divorced American writer who published as John Oliver Hobbes.

== W. B. Yeats ==
=== Friendship ===
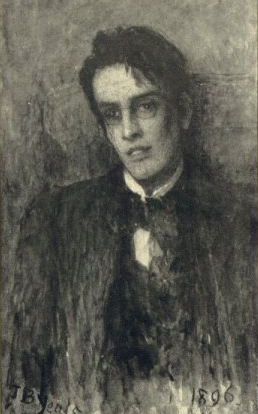
An 1896 portrait of W. B. Yeats by his father, John Butler Yeats, is the frontispiece of Celtic Twilight.

On 16 April 1894, accompanied by Pearl Craigie, Olivia attended a literary dinner to launch The Yellow Book, and was seated opposite W. B. Yeats. Recently returned from visiting Maud Gonne in Paris, Yeats was in London for the production of his play The Land of Heart's Desire. The two were not introduced that evening but Yeats, probably through Lionel Johnson (who became disruptively drunk at the dinner), enquired about the woman seated opposite. Yeats was deeply affected, later writing in his memoirs of the encounter: "I noticed opposite me .... a woman of great beauty ... She was exquisitely dressed ... and suggested to me an incomparable distinction."

Soon after, Olivia attended a showing of The Land of Heart's Desire, and found herself moved by the performance. She wanted to meet the "tall and black haired" poet and asked Johnson to invite Yeats to tea on 10 May 1894, adding in her handwriting to the invitation, "I shall be so glad to see you". In his Memoirs Yeats referred to her as "Diana Vernon", writing, "In this book I cannot giver her real name—Diana Vernon sounds pleasantly in my ears and will suit as well as any other". They quickly established a strong friendship, with Olivia listening sympathetically to his obsessive love for Maud. When Yeats later described their friendship, he wrote, "I told her of my love sorrow, indeed it was my obsession, never leaving by day or night". Writing in The Last Courtly Lover, Gloria Kline suggests Olivia and Yeats began a friendship based on the discussion of literature and his willingness to review her work.

John Unterecker, writing in "Faces and False Faces", sees friendship as the most important aspect in the relationship, explaining, "she found in Yeats, as he in her, a person who could discuss literature and ideas ... she was one of the few persons with whom he could be completely relaxed". Comparing the difference between Maud and Olivia he writes, "Maud Gonne offered Yeats subject matter for poetry, the 'interesting' life he had hoped for, and Olivia Shakespear offered him repose".

According to Kline, Yeats compared Olivia to Diana and Maud to Helen; he was attracted to dark coloured women, describing Olivia's skin as "a little darker than a Greek's would have been and her hair was very dark". Literary scholar Humphrey Carpenter writes that Yeats' impression of Olivia was one of a woman with "a profound culture, a knowledge of French, English, and Italian and seemed always at leisure. Her nature was gentle and contemplative, and she was content, it seems, to have no more of life than leisure and the talk of her friends".

Shakespear's novella, Beauty's Hour, was a manuscript Yeats had solicited for The Savoy, the literary journal edited by his friend Arthur Symons. He read the manuscript and suggested revisions, which Anne Margaret Daniel discusses in her introduction to her edition of Beauty's Hour (2016); and Yeats may have contributed to the characterisations. Kline believes the two began a friendship based on the discussion of literature; Yeats biographer Foster adds they were drawn together by a mutual interest in the occult. For Yeats, then aged 30, an important aspect of their friendship was the opportunity it presented for a sexual relationship with a woman, something he had not then experienced.

In August Yeats returned to Ireland, continuing his correspondence with Olivia, writing to her about Maud's recently giving birth to a daughter, Iseult. In her letters Olivia may have been honest about her feelings toward him; in April 1895 he wrote to her, "I no more complain of your writing of love, than I would complain of a portrait painter keeping to portraits".

=== Love affair ===
Yeats delayed visiting Olivia in London a month later; he instead tended to Johnson, who was involved in the Wilde case and descending into the alcoholism that would kill him. Yeats appeared to have persuaded himself that Olivia and her cousin shared a flaw, writing, "here is the same weakness I thought ... Her beauty ... dark and still, had the nobility of defeated things, and how could it help but wring my heart. I took a fortnight to decide what I should do". He constructed a plan to reconcile his desire with what he believed to be her wickedness: he would ask that she leave her husband to live with him. Until then their friendship would remain platonic.

Yeats finally visited Olivia at her Porchester Square home a few weeks later to present his well-thought-out intentions but, to his bewilderment, Olivia declared her love for him. Unsure of himself, he took another absence, during which he decided that if Maud was unattainable, or unavailable due to circumstances, he would have Olivia, writing "but after all if I could not get the woman I loved it would be a comfort for a little while to devote myself to another". For Yeats, Olivia was willing to lose her daughter, financial security, social standing, and the goodwill of her family. Although her husband had grounds to sue Yeats and consequently destroy his reputation, her best hope against complete ruin was Shakespear's strong dislike of public scenes. Then Yeats lost his nerve again, suggesting instead each seek advice from a friend (a "sponsor"). He probably chose Florence Farr to be his sponsor while Olivia chose Valentine Fox—Harwood speculates that the sponsors advised the two to go ahead with the affair, perhaps to Yeats' discomfort.

On 15 July 1895, Yeats and Olivia travelled to Kent to visit Valentine Fox; the trip Harwood says "would have been, emotionally speaking a highly charged outing". Of the railway trip, Yeats wrote in his memoirs, "when on our first railway journey together—we were to spend the day at Kent—she gave the long passionate kiss of love, I was startled & a little shocked". They went on to share more passionate kisses in art galleries and at her home.

Maud Gonne in about 1896: Olivia ended her affair with Yeats due to his love for Gonne.

Still distressed about Lionel, Yeats turned to Arthur Symons for companionship, moving into a room adjacent to his in October 1895. One day while preoccupied and thinking about Maud he locked himself out just before Olivia and her sponsor arrived to visit; as soon as she left, he stayed up all night telling Symons about Maud. She arrived in London a few weeks later for a brief visit.

Yeats was ambivalent about Olivia despite the advice of the sponsors; with no money to support her, he suggested she seek a legal separation (instead of a divorce), sparing her social ostracism and financial ruin. Ezra Pound's biographer Jay Wilhelm suggests Shakespear knew that Olivia loved Yeats but seemed more concerned about the loss of social status in the event of divorce, causing Yeats and Olivia to decide that "it was kinder to simply deceive him than totally abandon him".

In January 1896 Yeats moved again, into a small flat in Woburn Place, so as to be nearer to her. Finally after a charged bed-buying session, with Yeats describing "an embarrassed conversation upon the width", and his nervousness preventing them at first from becoming lovers, he eventually wrote in January 1896, "at last she came to me in my thirtieth year .... and we had many days of happiness". Yeats' happiness is apparent in the poems he wrote at that period, and for the duration of their affair, Olivia appears to have acted as a muse to the poet. (Note: Hassett describes Yeats' "He Remembers Forgotten Beauty", published in The Savoy' in January 1896, as a "moving encomium to Olivia" in which she is symbolically cast as a White Goddess or lunar goddess. See Hassett (2010), pp. 18–19.)

Six months later Yeats had returned Ireland, and in August Olivia was visiting Valentine Fox with her husband where she received news of her father's death. She left for an extended stay in Torquay, where she stayed until September before leaving for a visit to Scotland with her husband. Yeats left Ireland for Paris to visit Maud in November, and did not return to London until January 1897, with Maud following close behind and arriving in London in February. Yeats wrote of Maud's visit: "Maud wrote to me ... she was in London & would I come to dine. I dined with her & my trouble increased—she certainly had no thought of the mischief she was doing – & at last one morning .... [Olivia] found my mood did not answer hers and & burst into tears—'There is someone else in your heart' she said. It was the breaking between us for many years". The affair ended that spring when Yeats again returned to Ireland. Olivia did not visit him again at Woburn Place for many years, according to Yeats biographer Richard Ellmann.

== Pembroke Mansions ==
Olivia's life is not well documented between 1897 and 1908. She visited her cousin Lionel for the last time in 1897 before he was isolated by his alcoholism. He died alone of a cerebral haemorrhage in 1902. In 1899 the family suffered an unspecified financial setback that forced them to move into an apartment in Bayswater to Pembroke Mansions, which a friend described by as "an uninviting Bayswater slum". A few months later Olivia's mother died. Within a week Olivia received a letter of condolence from Yeats, which may have been the first letter she received from him in two years, since 1897. Several scholars and biographers speculate that they resumed their love affair at some point between 1903 and 1910; Pound biographer Wilhelm believes they reconciled as early as 1903, while Yeats biographers Jeffares and Ross suggest the affair likely reignited for a period in 1906. However, Anne Margaret Daniel recently discovered a copy of Yeats's The Shadowy Waters in private hands in New York. It is inscribed from Yeats to Shakespear and dated 19 December 1900, showing a connection reestablished by then.

For a short time in 1901 Olivia held a position as a book reviewer for The Kensington Review, a small literary magazine, until it succumbed to poor sales. After, she dabbled in the occult and became friendly with prominent London occultists. In 1902 she co-wrote with Florence Farr — who for a time led the Order of Golden Dawn — two plays on the occult, The Beloved of Hathor and The Shrine of the Golden Hawk, which were subsequently published as a pair.

Although the family received an inheritance from Olivia's mother, they continued to live in Bayswater. For a period Dorothy was at boarding school, after which she was sent to a finishing school in Geneva. To save money, the family often left London during the summer, to take long visits to relatives in the country, in particular her brother Henry Tucker. Not until 1905 did the family lease a house in Brunswick Gardens, near Kensington Palace, when Dorothy returned home to live with her parents.

== Dorothy and Ezra Pound ==
Records of Olivia's life resume through Dorothy's letters and diaries surrounding the arrival of the American poet Ezra Pound in London in 1909. Following her friends in Kensington society, Olivia opened her home once a week for a salon, beginning an important period in her life. When Yeats returned to London that year, Olivia became the centre of a blossoming literary movement. Yeats held a Monday evening salon; those who attended usually also visited Olivia's. She hosted, and became a nexus for, much of the pre-war literary activity in London. Notable attendees included Pound, Hilda Doolitle, Yeats, Wyndham Lewis, Henri Gaudier-Brzeska, Walter Morse Rummel, Richard Aldington, William Carlos Williams, T. E. Hulme and John Cournos. The gatherings were held in her drawing room, a place Pound described in a letter as "full of white magic". Olivia was by now a well-known occultist and hosted séances in her drawing room. She became well-versed in astrology and palmistry, passing on what she knew to Dorothy who shared her interest. Both read grimoires; Olivia was an expert at "drawing occult symbols" and quite familiar with the symbology of the occult. Olivia met Pound in January 1909 at a Kensington salon hosted by a friend; she invited him for tea on 16 February 1909, and, at his insistence, introduced Pound to Yeats in May 1909. Yeats had recently returned to London and began a thorough investigation of spiritualism and the occult, turning to Olivia for advice. She took the young American poet to Yeats' rooms at Woburn Place, fostering their relationship.

Dorothy soon fell in love with Pound. In late 1909 and early 1910 Olivia and Dorothy attended his lectures at the London Polytechnic Institution; in June 1910 they joined him in Sirmione, Italy. For reasons unclear to biographers Olivia forbade the two from writing to each other during his extended visit to New York from 1910 to 1911. Despite the restriction Dorothy seems to have considered herself engaged to Pound, although uncertain whether he intended to stay in New York or return to London.

In 1910 Yeats thought his horoscope suggested a return to Olivia; he distanced himself from Maud and in June began to see Olivia more frequently. Pound was fond of Olivia, which may have caused Yeats some jealousy as when, for example, Pound met the two at the theatre and took them afterward to tea—an occasion when Yeats was extremely rude to Pound. A year later, Olivia introduced Yeats to Georgie Hyde-Lees, her 18-year-old step-niece and Dorothy's best friend, whom Yeats eventually married. (Note: Olivia's brother Henry Tucker married Georgie's mother Nelly Hyde-Lees in 1909. See Foster (1997), p. 437.)

Pound returned from America in 1911 and resumed his visits to Olivia and Dorothy, adhering to Olivia's restrictions. That October Pound formally asked to marry Dorothy; her father refused on the basis of Pound's meagre income. Neither Dorothy nor Pound gave up: he again asked for permission to marry her in March 1912 but was again rejected. In Dorothy's mind they continued to be engaged, although they were only allowed short visits in the Family drawing room once a week or every two weeks.

Olivia became concerned about her daughter after Hilda Doolittle, who also believed she was engaged to Pound, arrived in London in 1911. Olivia welcomed H.D. to her home, but she witnessed the interactions between Dorothy, Pound, H.D. and Richard Aldington, whom H.D. married in 1913. In September 1912 Olivia wrote a stern letter to Pound, in which she pointedly told him to break off his friendship with Dorothy:

You told me you were prepared to see less of Dorothy this winter. I don't know if you wd rather leave it to me to say I don't think it advisable she should see so much of you etc. or whether you wd rather do it in your own way .... I don't know if she still considers herself engaged to you—but she obviously can't marry you—it's hardly decent! There's another point too—which is the personal inconvenience & bother to myself—I had all last winter, practically to keep 2 days a week for you to come & see her ... She must marry—She & I can't possibly go on living this feminine life practically à deux for ever, & we haven't money enough to separate ... You ought to go away—Englishmen don't understand yr American ways, & any man who wanted to marry her wd be put off by the fact of yr friendship (or whatever you call it) with her. If you had £500 a year I should be delighted for you to marry her!

In 1913, Olivia introduced Pound to vorticist sculptor Henri Gaudier-Brzeska at an art exhibition at the Albert Hall. At the same exhibition the sculptor met Nina Hamnett, whom he subsequently used as a model for a series of nudes bronzes, one of which Olivia bought. In 1914, Olivia translated a grimoire for Yeats and Pound, who spent November 1913 to January 1914 in the countryside at Stone Cottage in Ashdown Forest—Pound acting as secretary to Yeats—researching the occult. They read several grimoires, and Olivia provided for them a translation of the Abbot of Villar's 1670 grimoire Le Comte de Gabalis. Her translation was serialised in the literary magazine The Egoist later that year.

By 1914 Olivia seems to have realised that Dorothy was determined to marry Pound, and finally consented; ironically Pound was then earning less than he had in 1911. Hope Shakespear relented when the couple agreed to a church wedding rather than a civil ceremony, which took place on 20 April 1914. Olivia gave them two early circus drawings by Pablo Picasso.

== Later life and death ==
After Dorothy's wedding much of the documentation of Olivia's life ceases. She moved out of Brunswick Gardens in 1924, throwing away personal correspondence and giving away hundreds of books. Hope Shakespear died on 5 July 1923; within months Olivia moved to an apartment in West Kensington, taking with her two maids who had been with the family for decades. Her life continued unchanged, filled with social events. In September 1926, Dorothy gave birth to a son, Omar Pound, who in 1927 was brought from France to be raised in England. Olivia became his guardian and Dorothy spent summers with her mother and son.

Your hair is white
My hair is white
Come let us talk of love
What other theme do we know
When we were young
We were in love with one another
And therefore ignorant
—Draft of "After Long Silence" Yeats enclosed in a letter written to Olivia in 1929.

In 1926 Yeats spent several weeks in London, likely visiting Olivia frequently. He showed regret for his behaviour in 1897, writing to her, "I came across two early photographs of you yesterday ... Who ever had a like profile?—a profile from a Sicilian coin. One looks back to one's youth as to a cup that a mad man dying of thirst left half tasted. I wonder if you feel like that?" The two maintained their correspondence, as they had for many years.

Olivia continued to socialise and had many friends, one of whom, Wyndham Lewis, painted her portrait; he enjoyed her company despite finding it difficult to relate to others. She stopped writing but remained an avid reader, turning to detective stories for light relief although she also kept up with literary authors. She became friendly with Thomas MacGreevy, whom she invited for tea, later writing to him, "WBY has given me the new edition of Reveries and the Veil, & I am re-reading it all. It is very beautifully done. He was about 29 when I first knew him". McGreevy told Yeats that Olivia was "always a symbol of elegance, a kind of gold and ivory image". Harwood writes of her, "Olivia Shakespear was avant-garde in literature, agnostic in religion, and conservative in politics, at least later in life".

Olivia's correspondence with Pound continued throughout the 1920s and 1930s, when she acted in part as his agent in London. In 1924, at Pound's request, she welcomed George Antheil into her social circle, procured artwork and books that were sent on to Dorothy and Ezra in Rapallo, and mediated in a dispute between Pound and Lewis. She was uninterested in Pound's politics and economic views and particularly disliked his later Cantos. After her husband's death, Olivia's income was sufficient to support a comfortable lifestyle. During the 1920s and 1930s she gradually increased Dorothy's income (which was also increased by various family bequests), and in the 1930s she made investments in Dorothy's name, sending the proceeds to Dorothy and Pound. In a very real sense, according to Harwood, Olivia Shakespear is the "unsung heroine" of the modernist period, because much of the money Ezra Pound generously used to support struggling writers such as T. S. Eliot and James Joyce came from her.

Olivia died of complications brought on by gall bladder disease on 3 October 1938. The day before her death she wrote in a letter to Dorothy: "On Monday I was taken suddenly ill with gall bladder trouble—awful pain—sent for Doctor Barnes—he gave me dope & an injection and pain gradually went ... He says I am going on all right, but of course I feel rather a wreck". She died the following day of a heart attack. John Unterecker believes Olivia's death shattered Yeats, who died only months later, because she added warmth to his life. Yeats wrote of her death:

Olivia Shakespear has died suddenly. For more than forty years she has been the centre of my life in London and during all that time we have never had a quarrel, sadness sometimes but never a difference. When I first met her she was in her late twenties but in looks a lovely young girl. When she died she was a lovely old woman ... She came of a long line of soldiers and during the last war thought it her duty to stay in London through all the air raids. She was not more lovely than distinguished—no matter what happened she never lost her solitude ... For the moment I cannot bear the thought of London. I will find her memory everywhere.

Dorothy was ill when her mother died, unable to travel to London. She sent Pound to organise the funeral and to clear out the house. Ezra sorted through Olivia's correspondence and returned to Yeats many of her letters. Unterecker writes that Yeats made an effort to keep the correspondence private: "Shortly before his death he methodically destroyed a large group of letters to Olivia Shakespear. These, returned to him after her death ... Yeats wanted no one to read".

== Novels: description and reception ==
Olivia had six novels published between 1894 and 1910, which as described by Foster are about women unhappy in love, with insipid and uninspiring male characters. The heroines—frequently orphaned, educated by elderly tutors, and depicted in country house libraries—fall in love with much older men in the later novels.

The first two novels were published in 1894 to mixed reviews. Love on a Mortal Lease (title from George Meredith) was released in June, followed in November by The Journey of High Honour, at 30,000 words considerably shorter than the 355 pages of Love on a Mortal Lease. Each novel sold only a few hundred copies. Harwood describes the early work such as Love on a Mortal Lease as showing stylistic similarities to contemporary women novelists such as Craighie and Rhonda Broughton, with witty dialogue in Craighie's style, although he thinks Olivia brought a more serious voice to her work. He describes Love on a Mortal Lease as a work in which the heroine is well-characterised but the background is weak.

In the summer of 1896, "The Savoy," edited by Arthur Symons, published a two-part novella by Shakespear called "Beauty's Hour". Anne Margaret Daniel says that the story was inspired by Robert Louis Stevenson's "Dr. Jekyll and Mr. Hyde" (1886), with the dilemma of good vs. evil translated here into that of an unattractive woman who longs for beauty. In 2016, Valancourt Books published Daniel's edition of "Beauty's Hour", marking the first return to print of Shakespear's fiction for many decades.

She dedicated The False Laurel, published in 1896, to Lionel Johnson. The plot features a poetess who falls in love with and marries an insipid young poet, giving up her own writing to attend to his needs. She becomes bored, writes a successful play, and then goes mad. The False Laurel was the least successful of her books, selling fewer than 200 copies. It received a poor review from The Bookman but a good one from The Athenaeneum.

Rupert Armstrong was published in 1899 by Harper and Brothers, dedicated to Valentine Fox. In this, the fourth of her novels, Harwood believes her writing and voice became more original. The complicated plot—a mother and daughter struggle for "possession of the [father's] artistic soul"—shows hints of incestuous love, a theme found in her later work. Written during the affair with Yeats, Harwood sees the characters presented "in a precise, bitter intensity unlike anything in the earlier work".

The Devotees was published by Heinemann in 1904. Like Rupert Armstrong, the plot of The Devotees depicts a mildly incestuous love: a young man and girl, raised together since childhood, devote themselves for decades to his drug-addicted mother before they marry. The reviews were mostly unkind.

Olivia's final novel, Uncle Hilary, was published in 1910 and is considered her best work. Of Uncle Hilary Jane Eldridge Miller writes in Rebel Women: Feminism, Modernism, and the Edwardian Novel, "Shakespear demonstrates the ways in which that ideal leads to disillusionment and resentment". In the complicated plot a young woman unwittingly marries her stepfather, leaves him, and accepts a marriage proposal from her guardian. Harwood believes her loveless marriage, the love affair with Yeats, the frustration with Dorothy, and Pound's unfaithfulness to Dorothy, built in her a strength and acceptance of life that bordered on the spiritual and she no longer needed to write.

Miller writes that in the novel Olivia explores "marriage laws, divorce, and bigamy", with a focus on the nature of romantic love—rejected in favour of spiritual and intellectual pursuits. Leon Surette writes in The Birth of Modernism, Olivia's Uncle Hilary highlights the ties between spiritualism, occultism and feminism, seeing Uncle Hilary as a feminist novel which he describes as "quite readable".

Jane Miller characterises the works as "marriage problem" novels in which the wife confronts the reality of marriage, its restrictions, and the need to achieve independence. By finding interests outside marriage the wife loses the overwhelming need for love within the marriage. Miller writes that in Uncle Hilary Olivia examines issues such as marriage laws, divorce, and bigamy, while focusing on the nature of romantic love. It was in Uncle Hilary that Olivia wrote of love: "Love is the worst slavery that exists ... it is the most persistent of illusions".

== List of works ==
Novels

- Love on a Mortal Lease (1894) – WorldCat
- The Journey of High Honour (1894) – WorldCat
- The False Laurel (1896) – WorldCat
- Rupert Armstrong (1898) – WorldCat
- The Devotees (1904) – WorldCat
- Uncle Hilary (1909) – WorldCat

Plays

- The Beloved of Hathor (1902) – ISBN 9781177395977 (reprint, also includes The Shrine of the Golden Hawk)
- The Shrine of the Golden Hawk (1902)

Novella

- "Beauty's Hour" (1896) – ISBN 9781943910403 (reprint)

== Notes ==
Sources

- Brown, Terence. The Life of W.B. Yeats: A Critical Biography. Oxford: Blackwell, 1999. ISBN 0-631-18298-5.
- Carpenter, Humphrey. A Serious Character: the life of Ezra Pound. London: Faber, 1988. ISBN 978-0-571-14786-1
- Ellmann, Richard. Yeats: The Man and the Masks. New York: Norton, 1999 edition. ISBN 0-393-00859-2
- Foster, R.F. W.B Yeats: A Life. New York: Oxford UP, 1997. ISBN 0-19-211735-1
- Harwood, John. After Long Silence. New York: St. Martin's, 1989. ISBN 0-312-03458-X
- Hassett, Joseph M. W.B. Yeats and the Muses. Oxford: Oxford UP, 2010. ISBN 978-0-19-958290-7
- Hickman, Miranda. "Olivia Shakespear". in Demetres P. Tryphonopoulos and Stephen Adams (eds). The Ezra Pound Encyclopedia. Westport, CT: Greenwood, 2005. ISBN 0-313-30448-3
- Jeffares, Alexander Norman. W.B. Yeats: A New Biography. London: Continuum, 2001. ISBN 0-8264-5524-7
- Jeffares, Alexander Norman. W.B. Yeats: Man and Poet. New York: St. Martin's, 1996. ISBN 0-312-15814-9
- Kline, Gloria. The Last Courtly Lover. Ann Arbor, MI: University of Michigan Research Press, 1983. ISBN 0-8357-1409-8
- Miller, Jane Eldridge. Rebel women: Feminism, Modernism, and the Edwardian novel. Chicago: Chicago UP, 1997. ISBN 0-226-52677-1
- Reynolds, Ann, E. Ezra Pound and Dorothy Shakespear: Their Letters 1909–1914. MagillOnLiterature. 1985.
- Ross, David. Critical Companion the William Butler Yeats. Facts on File, 2009. ISBN 978-0-8160-5895-2
- Shakespear, Olivia. "Beauty's Hour." London, 1896; Anne Margaret Daniel (ed). Valancourt, 2016. ISBN 1943910405
- Stock, Noel. The Life of Ezra Pound. New York: Pantheon, 1970. ISBN 0-86547-075-8
- Surette, Leon. The Birth of Modernism: Ezra Pound, T.S. Eliot, W.B. Yeats, and the Occult. Montreal: McGill UP, 1993. ISBN 0-7735-0976-3
- Tryphonopoulos, Demetres, "Ezra Pound's Occult Education". Journal of Modern Language. 34 (1): Summer 1990.
- Unterecker, John. "Faces and False Faces". in Unterecker, John (ed). Yeats: A Collection of Critical Essays. Englewood Cliffs, NY: Prentice Hall, 1963.
- Wilhelm, James J. Ezra Pound in London and Paris, 1908–1925. University Park, PA: Pennsylvania State UP, 2008. ISBN 978-0-271-02798-2
- Wilhelm, James J. Ezra Pound: The Tragic Years 1925–1972. University Park, PA: Pennsylvania State UP, 1994. ISBN 0-271-01082-7
- Yeats, William Butler. Memoirs. London: Macmillan, 1973.
