= Brunnenburg =

Castle in South Tyrol, Italy

Coordinates: 46°41′31″N 11°08′52″E

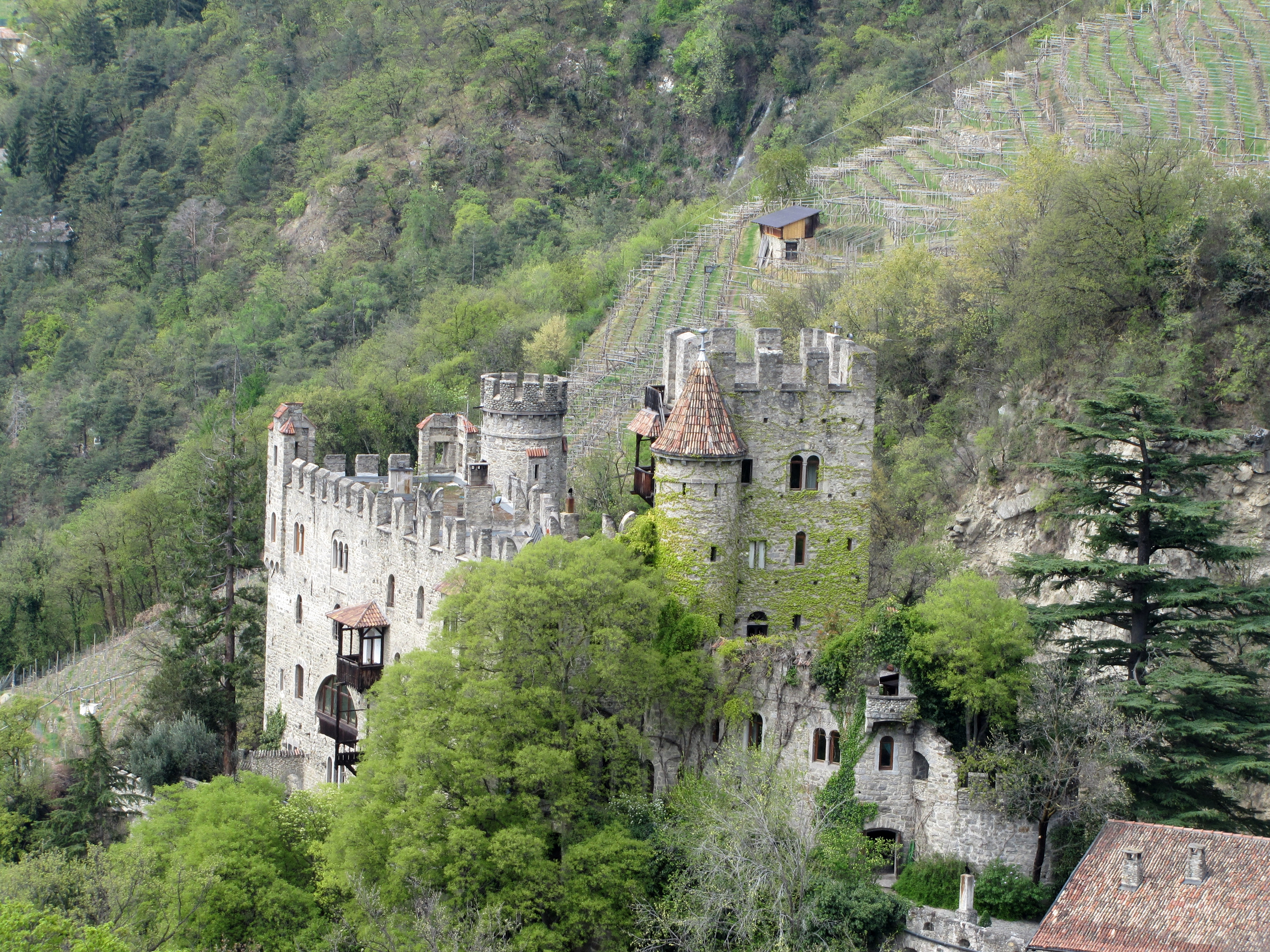
The Brunnenburg today

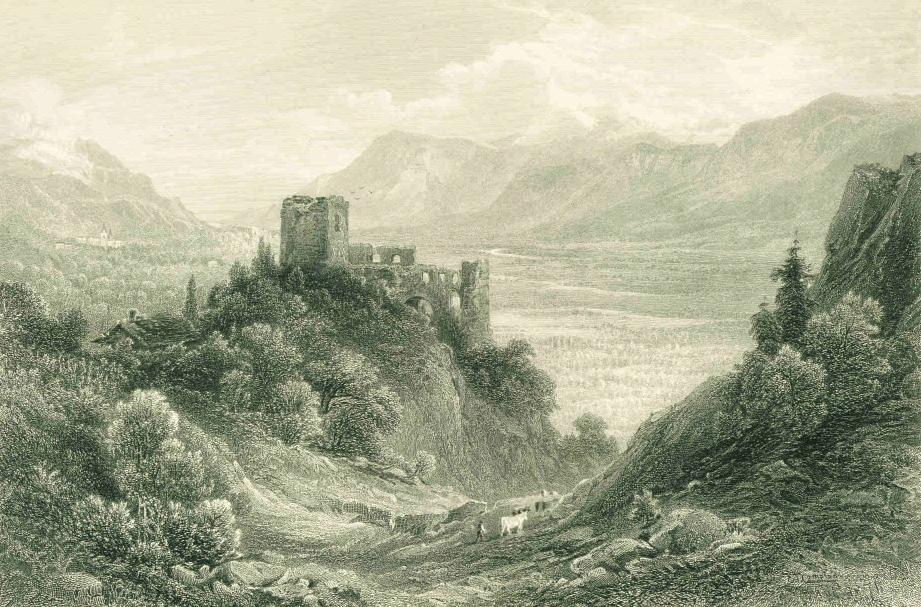
Ruins of the Brunnenburg, engraving c. 1845

Brunnenburg (Italian: Castel Fontana, Castel Brunnenburg) is a 13th-century castle in the province of South Tyrol, in northern Italy.

== History ==
Schloss Brunnenburg is situated above the city of Merano, on the outskirts of the municipality of Tirol. Originally built circa 1250, the castle was completely restored and updated in the mid-20th century by Boris de Rachewiltz, an Egyptologist, and his wife Mary, daughter of the poet Ezra Pound and violinist Olga Rudge; Mary lived there until her death in 2026. Surrounding the castle is the family's vineyard.

Pound stayed with his daughter and her family at the castle in 1958 after he returned from the United States. It was there that he wrote the last six of his 116 "cantos" of The Cantos.

== The Ezra Pound Centre for Literature ==
The Ezra Pound Centre for Literature was established at the castle by his daughter, where students come from all over the world to study the poet's works. A large guesthouse on the castle grounds is used as temporary housing for students, usually for a semester at a time.
