= The City of Falling Angels =

Book by John Berendt

- Author: John Berendt
- Language: English
- Genre: Nonfiction
- Publisher: Penguin Press
- Publication date: 2005
- Publication place: United States
- Media type: Print (Hardback & Paperback)
- ISBN: 1-59420-058-0
- Preceded by: Midnight in the Garden of Good and Evil

The City of Falling Angels (2005) is a non-fiction work by John Berendt. The book tells the story of some interesting inhabitants of Venice, Italy, whom the author met while living there in the months following a fire which destroyed the historic La Fenice opera house in 1996.

== Synopsis ==
The book explores local reactions to the fire, from the American "Save Venice" Foundation to Venice's bureaucratic government. The opera house burned again while the second renovation was ongoing.

Among those interviewed is Archimede Seguso, a renowned Venetian glassblower of the twentieth century. Seguso lived directly behind La Fenice and witnessed the fire. Soon afterwards he created glassworks dedicated to the memory of the fire, in his own rendition of how the opera house burned.

The book also tells the story of many American and English expatriates who went to live in Venice, from Daniel Sargent Curtis, who owned the Palazzi Barbaro where Henry James and John Singer Sargent were guests, to the poet Ezra Pound, who lived the last part of his life in Venice with his long-time mistress Olga Rudge.

== Reception ==
Upon this book's release on September 27, 2005, it entered Amazon.com's Top Ten Bestsellers list and was number one on the New York Times Best Seller list.

According to Kirkus Reviews, "Berendt does great justice to an exalted city that has rightly fascinated the likes of Henry James, Robert Browning, and many filmmakers throughout the world."
