= Discretions =

1971 memoir by Mary de Rachewiltz

- Author: Mary de Rachewiltz
- Genre: Memoir
- Publication date: 1971

Discretions, also published as Ezra Pound, Father and Teacher: Discretions, is a 1971 memoir of Mary de Rachewiltz, an Italian-American translator and poet. It is about Rachewiltz's childhood with a foster family in the Italian Tyrol and about her father, the American poet Ezra Pound.

== Summary ==
Mary de Rachewiltz, a translator and poet, was born as Maria Rudge in 1925 as the daughter of the American poet Ezra Pound and his mistress Olga Rudge, a concert violinist. She grew up at a farm in the Italian Tyrol with a foster family. During her childhood, she met her biological parents during their visits to the farm and her own visits to Venice, where she occasionally observed her father writing poetry. From the age of 13 she lived with Pound and Olga in Venice. As a grown-up, she translated her father's major work The Cantos into Italian.

== Reception ==
Brad Darrach of Time called the book a "discreet but perceptive memoir" that delivered on the hope that Pound's friends and family would provide their perspectives on the man, whose literary accomplishment and status followed by his choices and Axis sympathies during World War II had puzzled the American establishment. Darrach wrote that the book does not make sense of what was going on inside Pound's head, but through its scenes of family life it "helps explain his crusty heart".

Anatole Broyard of The New York Times wrote that the book's portrayal of life at the farm is more successful than its portrayal of Pound, but that it is fascinating to see Pound described as a father. He wrote that the book contains nothing about Pound's antisemitism, but gives glimpses of his monetary theories, and his idea that understanding "the nature of money" is a necessity for writing great poetry. Broyard wrote that Rachewiltz illuminates some obscure parts of The Cantos, which refer to private events, and reveals how Pound increasingly treated The Cantos as a kind of diary.

In Modern Age, Henry Regnery called Discretions "a beautifully written, charming book which tells us much not only about the complex author of Indescretions, but because of her place of observation in the middle of it all, much about our time as well".
