= John Berendt =

American author (born 1939)

- Born: 5 December 1939 (age 86); Syracuse, New York, U.S.
- Education: Harvard University
- Occupation: Author
- Writing career
- Period: 1961–present
- Genre: non-fiction

John Berendt (born December 5, 1939) is an American author, known for writing the best-selling non-fiction book Midnight in the Garden of Good and Evil, which was a finalist for the 1995 Pulitzer Prize in General Nonfiction, and The City of Falling Angels, which tells the story of interesting inhabitants of Venice, Italy, whom Berendt met while living there in the months following a fire which destroyed the historic La Fenice opera house in 1996.

== Early life ==
Berendt grew up in Syracuse, New York, where both of his parents were writers. As an English major at Harvard University, he worked on the staff of the Harvard Lampoon. He graduated in 1961 and moved to New York City to pursue a journalism career.

== Career ==
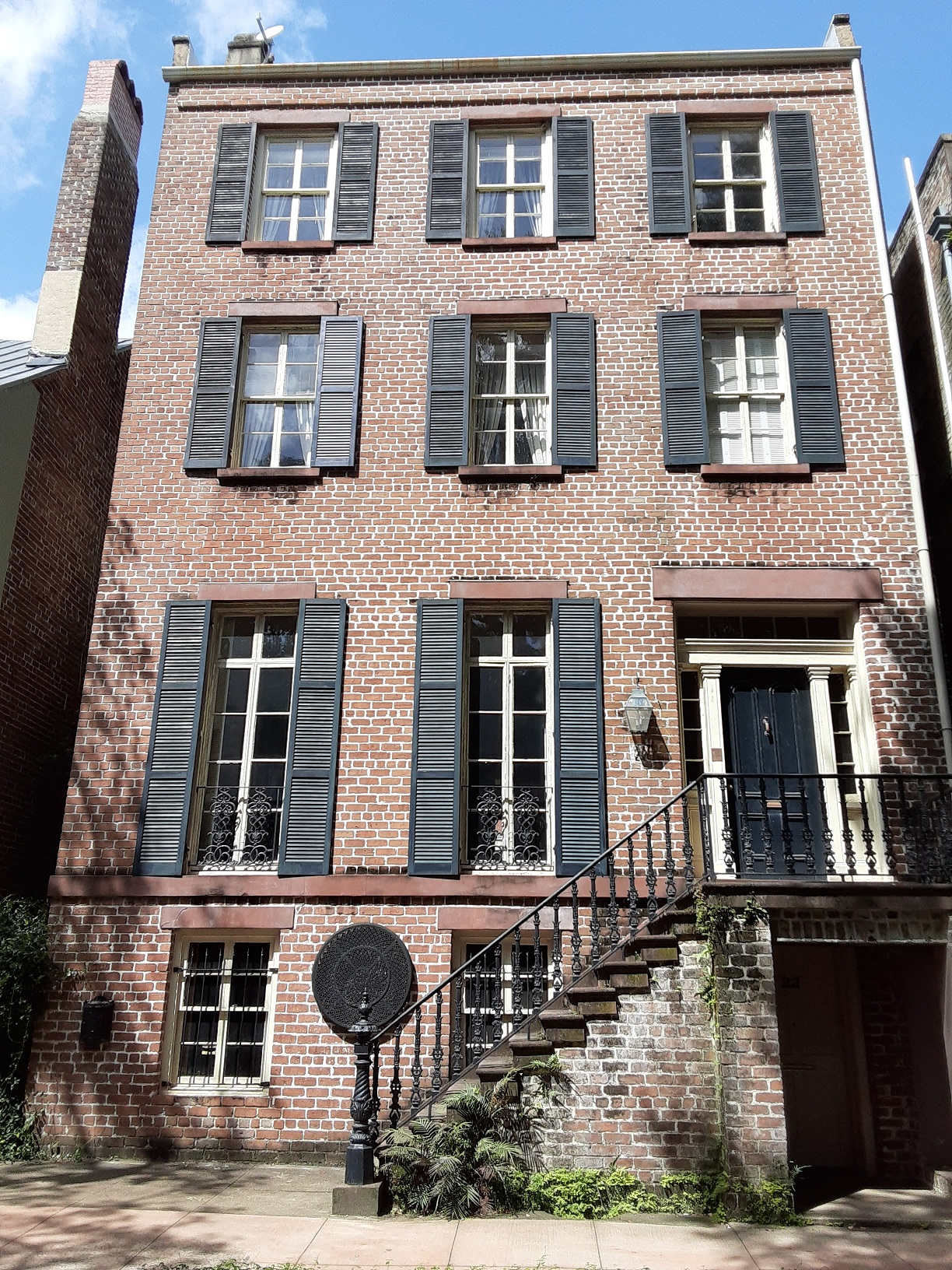
Upon moving to Savannah, Berendt lived in a carriage house behind 22 East Jones Street

Berendt was an associate editor of Esquire from 1961 to 1969, editor of New York magazine from 1977 to 1979, and a columnist for Esquire from 1982 to 1994. In 1985, three years after meeting antiques dealer Jim Williams, who became the central character in Midnight in the Garden of Good and Evil, Berendt moved to Savannah, Georgia, and spent the next seven years researching the book. (The killing of Danny Hansford, by Williams, which is the book's central story, happened in 1981. The first of Williams's four trials was in 1982.) Berendt's initial plan was to spend three weeks at a time in Savannah, then return to New York City to write, but he changed his mind. "Things would happen if I was simply there," he said in 1997. "It made sense to stay, so I got a full-time apartment in Savannah." He lived, briefly, in a carriage house on East Charlton Lane, behind 22 East Jones Street.

External videos
- Booknotes interview with Berendt on Midnight in the Garden of Good and Evil, August 28, 1997, C-SPAN

Midnight in the Garden of Good and Evil was published January 1994, and became an overnight success. The book spent a record-breaking 216 weeks on the New York Times bestseller list — a record that still stands. The non-fiction book reads like a novel and features several quirky characters. The book was adapted into a 1997 film directed by Clint Eastwood. John Cusack plays John Kelso, a character loosely based on Berendt. Also in 1997, Berendt wrote the foreword for Roulhac Toledano's The National Trust Guide to Savannah.

Berendt's second book, The City of Falling Angels, was published in September 2005. It chronicles interwoven lives in Venice in the aftermath of the fire that destroyed the Fenice opera house. According to Kirkus Reviews, "Berendt does great justice to an exalted city that has rightly fascinated the likes of Henry James, Robert Browning, and many filmmakers throughout the world."

In 2011, a bluejay creating a nest outside the window of Berendt's New York City townhouse inspired him to photograph, almost daily, the building of the nest and, ultimately, eggs hatching, chicks emerging, learning to fly and leaving the nest. Berendt wrote a children's story to accompany his photographs, which was published as My Baby Blue Jays by Penguin/Random House. Dolly Parton's Dollywood Foundation, through its Imagination Library, distributed hundreds of thousands of copies for free to children across the U.S.

In 2024, Berendt spoke at the Savannah Book Festival, on the occasion of the 30th-anniversary of the publication of Midnight in the Garden of Good and Evil.

In 1996, Jack Wrangler wrote and co-produced, with George Wein, Midnight in the Garden of Good and Evil: The Jazz Concert, starring Margaret Whiting based on the songs of Savannah native Johnny Mercer.

A musical based on Midnight in the Garden of Good and Evil opened at Chicago's Goodman Theatre in June of 2024. In September 2024, it was announced that the musical would open on Broadway in 2025.
