= Olga Rudge =

American violinist (1895–1996)

Olga Rudge, c. 1915

Olga Rudge (April 13, 1895 – March 15, 1996) was an American-born concert violinist and musician, who had a long-term relationship with the poet Ezra Pound, by whom she had a daughter, Mary.

A gifted concert violinist of international repute, her considerable talents and reputation were eventually eclipsed by those of her lover, in whose shade she appeared content to remain. In return, Pound was more loyal, not to say faithful, to her than to any of his many other lovers. He dedicated the final stanza of his epic The Cantos to her, in homage and gratitude for her courageous and loyal support during his 13-year incarceration in a mental hospital after having been indicted for treason against the United States for supporting Benito Mussolini's Fascist regime. She also defended Pound against the accusation that he was antisemitic. During the last 11 years of Pound's life, Rudge was his devoted companion, secretary, and nurse, as he sank into eccentricity and prolonged periods of silence.

Rudge survived Pound by twenty-four years, remaining in the small house in Venice she had shared with him. In her declining years, an ongoing difficult relationship with Mary, her only child, left her vulnerable to the attention of parties with ulterior motives, resulting in the sad situation described in John Berendt's The City of Falling Angels, in which Rudge could not account for how Pound's papers and letters in her possession had found their way to Yale University. Failing health eventually forced her to leave her beloved Venice and spend her final days with her daughter. Rudge died at age 100 and is buried next to Pound in Venice's Isola di San Michele cemetery.

== Early life ==
Rudge was born to J. Edgar Rudge, a real estate investor, and Julia (née O'Connell) Rudge, a professional singer. Wanting to pursue a singing career, Julia moved to Europe with her three children when Olga was 10, living first in London and then in Paris. Olga was educated at a convent school in Sherborne, Dorset, England, before studying in Paris under the violinist Léon Carambât of the Opéra-Comique.

By 1916, Rudge was a renowned concert violinist, performing in many concerts to raise money for the British and French sides of the First World War. Her brother, Arthur, was killed in action in 1918. At the end of the war in 1918, she began her career as an international concert violinist, under the auspices of Ildebrando Pizzetti and his patroness Katherine Dalliba-John. In 1918, Pizzetti and Rudge did a joint concert tour of Italy, performing modern Italian music.

== Career ==
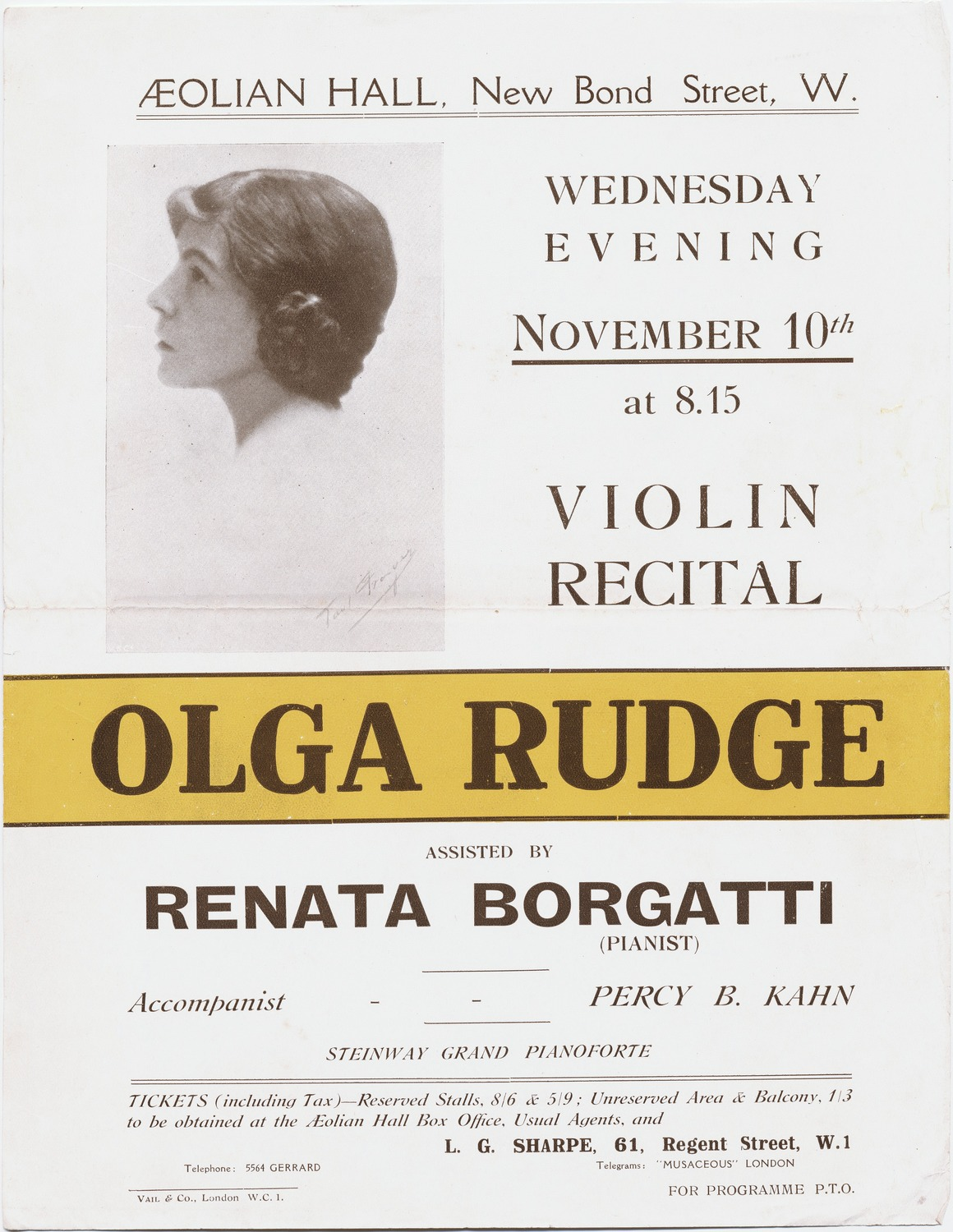
Ezra Pound reviewed Olga Rudge's performance at the Aeolian Hall in November 1920.

Rudge first met the poet Ezra Pound when he reviewed a concert Rudge gave at the Aeolian Hall in November 1920, admiring the "delicate firmness of her fiddling" yet criticising the "piano whack" of her accompanist Renata Borgatti. Rudge continued her association with Borgatti and pursued her interest in modern Italian music, giving concerts with Borgatti and Pizzetti at the Sala Bach in Rome in 1921, and joining Renata Borgatti again at the Salle Pleyel in 1922.

One of her first meetings with Pound took place in 1923, in Paris at the salon of Natalie Barney. Pound later recalled "her delicate and unemphatic reserve". At this time Pound was developing his own musical interests, composing an opera and advancing the work of American composer George Antheil. Antheil and Rudge were to enjoy a long professional collaboration dating from this period, which also marked the beginning of her sexual relationship with Pound. Rudge was now an established and successful soloist living in a luxurious apartment on Paris's respectable "right bank". She had nothing to gain by an association with a bohemian eccentric poet such as Pound, who was definitely "left bank" in his views and works. This willingness to flout convention and put her reputation at risk would typify her long affair with Pound.

In December 1923, Rudge and Antheil gave a concert at the Salle du Conservatoire which included not only works by Mozart, Bach, and Antheil, but also Ezra Pound's "Sujet pour violin". For his work to be performed by a notable soloist was exactly the publicity Pound the aspiring composer desired. In 1924, Rudge and Antheil performed "Musique Americaine" at the Salle Pleyel. This concert also included work by Pound and Antheil's "Deuxieme Sonate", dedicated to Rudge. From 1923 onwards, Pound's letters to Rudge advise her on her career. He strongly recommended she pay more attention to her patrons (something he himself never failed to do), and chided her for her lack of interest in the press comments concerning her concerts.

By 1924, Pound and his wife, the former Dorothy Shakespear, had moved from Paris to Rapallo, Italy. Rudge, now in the full throes of her enduring love affair with Pound, visited him several times. From this time Pound seems to have divided his time equally between Rudge and his wife, a situation which was to continue until the Second World War. In the spring of 1925, Rudge was forced to pull out of a planned concert tour of the United States as she was pregnant by Pound. On July 9, 1925, she gave birth to her daughter Maria, soon to be going by the English equivalent Mary, at the local hospital in the city of Brixen in the province of South Tyrol. Keen to avoid the stigma an illegitimate child would have on her career, Rudge paid to have Maria looked after by a peasant family in the South Tyrolian village of Gais—a German-speaking village part of Italy.

She remained unconcerned about the possible stigma of being the lover of a married man, and her association with Pound continued unabated. She resumed her career with a concert at the Salle Pleyel in 1926, where she played in the premiere of Pound's new opera, Le Testament de Villon. Her association with Antheil continued with concerts in the capital cities of Europe, and at this time she began to specialise in the works of Mozart. She was now one of the most celebrated solo violinists of the era, playing before the Heads of State and political leaders of Europe.

In 1928, Rudge's father bought her a small house in Venice, situated in the Calle Querini. Named "The Hidden Nest", it was to be her Venetian home for the remainder of her life. There, she began to develop her maternal instincts, bringing her daughter Maria for occasional visits. It was the beginning of a difficult and complex relationship between mother and daughter. Maria's existence was a closely guarded secret: Pound did not disclose it even to his own father until 1930. Pound often stayed with Rudge when their daughter visited Venice. However, the couple were often keen to be alone together, and so Rudge rented a Rapallo house near that of Pound and his wife, where the couple were able to conduct their affair unhindered by wife and children.

The 1930s were the years of a global depression affecting all industries including the music industry. Most patrons and customers of concerts, venues, and performers were now often in financial difficulties themselves. To make ends meet, Rudge worked in 1933 as a secretary to Accademia Musicale Chigiana in Siena. She also managed to continue her musical career, performing in the annual Concerti Tigulliani program organized by Pound at Rapallo. Around this time, Rudge and Pound became key figures in the Antonio Vivaldi revival. The 1936 Concerti Tigulliani program was devoted to Vivaldi, especially his lesser-known works. To prepare for these concerts, Rudge studied many of Vivaldi's original scores kept in Turin. She attempted to organize a Vivaldi Society in Venice, without success. In 1938, she founded the "Centro di Studi Vivaldiani" at the "Accademia Chigiana", devoted to Vivaldi's work.

Rudge and Pound were both keen readers of mystery and detective novels: this was the era of Agatha Christie, whose books earned her a fortune. Seeking to do the same, Pound and Rudge began in the 1930s, but never completed, a detective novel of their own; titled "The Blue Spill", it centred on the escapades of a Surrey detective. As World War II approached, Rudge limited her travel outside of Italy, last playing in London in 1935. By this time, Pound was vehemently pro-Mussolini and had begun broadcasting his views on Radio Rome, with Rudge's support. In 1941, they thought of returning to the U.S.A. for the duration of the war. Pound eventually decided against doing so, and they remained in Italy throughout the war. Pound's failure, at a crucial juncture, to declare his loyalty to his native country when it was at war, haunted him from the end of the war until the end of his life. As for Rudge, she had to live with the suspicion that she was the lover of a traitor to her country.

== War years ==
The war years were difficult for the couple. After the United States entered the war, Pound and his wife Dorothy became enemy aliens in Italy, an ironic situation in light of Pound's support of Mussolini. Their home in Rapallo was sequestered in 1943 and the couple had little choice but to move in with Rudge. Thus the ménage à trois for so long a matter of public speculation became a reality. Rudge sent her daughter back to Gais to live with her original peasant guardians, and was forced by necessity to support the Pounds and her daughter by giving language lessons. It was a very difficult time for the trio: while both women adored Pound, they hated each other. Pound's wife later wrote that "hatred and tension permeated the house".

Following the United States' invasion of Italy in 1945, Pound was arrested as a traitor and was held in an open cage in Pisa for 25 days. His support for the Fascists and broadcasts for Rome radio led to an indictment for treason. Rudge too had been arrested. She was released after interrogation, but she was not permitted to correspond with her lover until several months later. She and Pound's wife are known to have once visited him during his detention.

Although she was deprived of her lover, the end of the war saw an improvement in Rudge's fortunes as her sequestered Venetian home was returned to her. In order to avoid a trial for treason, Pound was declared criminally insane and incarcerated in an asylum, St. Elizabeths Hospital in Washington, D.C., where he remained for twelve years. Rudge began the onerous task of trying to secure his freedom. She used friends and their many contacts in the literary world to mount a petition attesting to his character and that amongst other things he had never in fact been a member of the Italian Fascist Party (Partito Nazionale Fascista). One of her ideas was that Pound be released to live in an American monastery, but all her entreaties fell on deaf ears. His letters discourage Rudge from visiting him but she did travel to America to visit him twice, once in 1952 and again in 1955. Pound at this time was receiving visits not only from his wife but other former lovers too. Following the 1955 visit, their letters to each other became cooler and more impersonal, and they rarely communicated at all from 1955 to 1959.

This coolness between 1955 and 1959 is the only hint that perhaps she did mind his other lady friends, but little is known of Rudge's views of Pound's "other women". She had no choice but to tolerate the existence of his wife. Marcella Spann, an English teacher, began to write to him in St. Elizabeth's, which led to visits. Following his release, Spann accompanied Ezra and Dorothy back to Italy, acting as his secretary. Pound is alleged to have proposed to her (although he was already married), but Dorothy sent Spann packing. Nevertheless, Spann and Pound jointly edited the 1964 volume Confucius to Cummings: An Anthology of Poetry.

== Venice and Pound ==
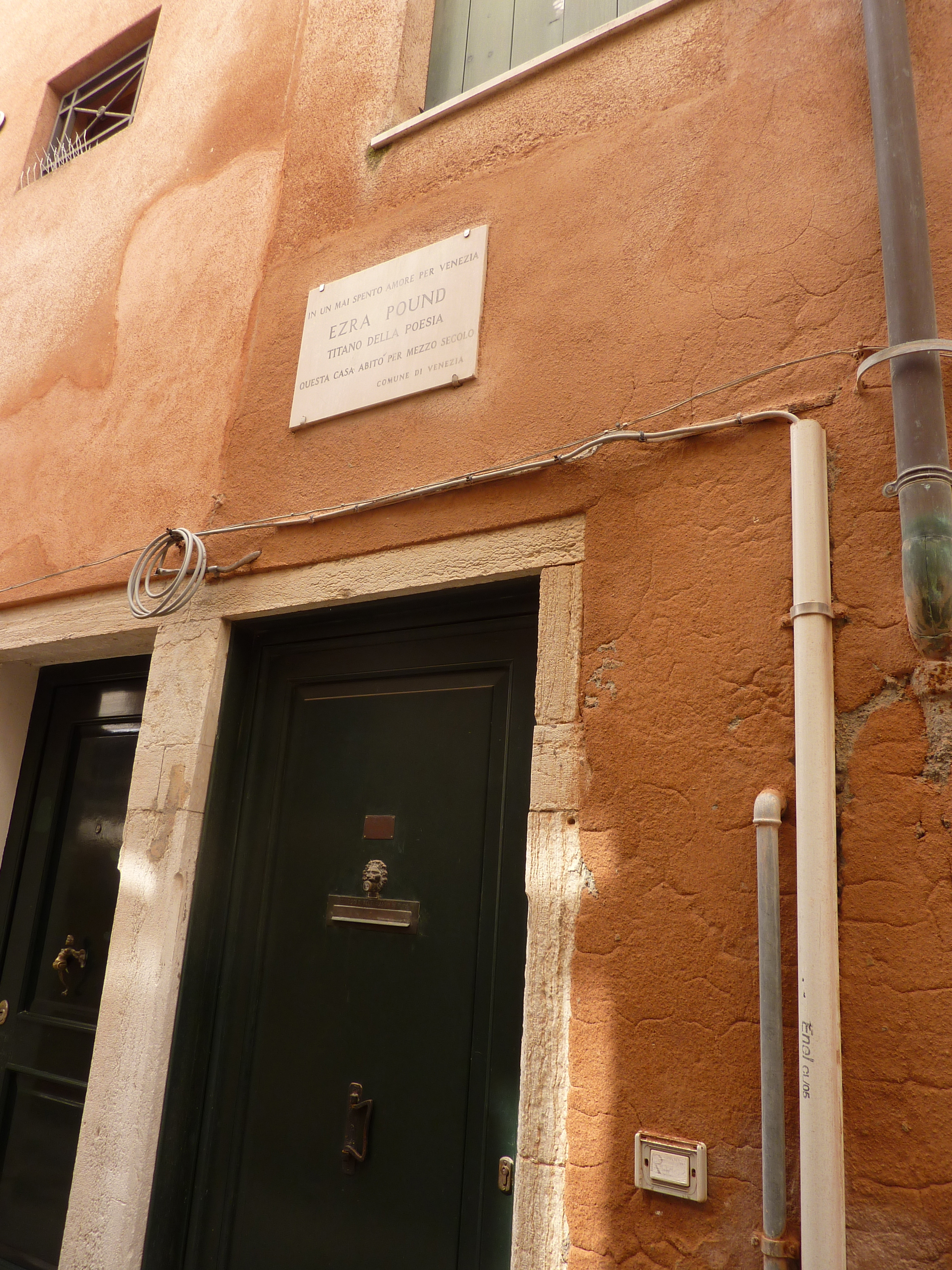
Rudge's home in Venice

In 1958, Pound was declared incapable of standing trial. He was stripped of his rights of citizenship and released from St. Elizabeth's on condition that he return to Europe. With his wife, who was also his legal custodian, he quickly returned to Italy. The couple stayed with Rudge's daughter by Pound, Mary, now married to Boris de Rachewiltz and living at Brunnenberg castle in Tirol. Pound's health was now broken and he spent a year in the sanatorium Martinsbrunn in Meran. It is thought that during his time in St. Elizabeth's Pound was treated with mind altering drugs that altered his personality permanently for the worse. In early 1962, "depressed and ill, Pound chose to put himself in Olga's hands". For the remainder of his life he lived with her, part of each year in Venice, and part in Rapallo.

The last eleven years of Pound's life accentuated his eccentricities, including a self-imposed vow of near-silence, with which Rudge coped while completely arranging his life and acting as his secretary. Many scholars and students sought Pound out and would arrive at the small house. Rudge devised a test to distinguish the genuine from the merely curious. She would ask the prospective visitor to recite a line from one of Pound's works; those who could gained admittance, those who could not were shown out. For Rudge, life with Pound was not easy; yet, her belief in him was absolute.

For the first time, Rudge now had Pound completely to herself, as his wife Dorothy withdrew from the triangle. Pound saw Dorothy only twice during his last four years. The couple seldom left their Venice or Rapallo homes; however, they journeyed to London in 1965 for the funeral of T. S. Eliot and to the United States in 1969. Pound, hospitalized immediately following his eighty-seventh birthday celebration, died on November 1, 1972, holding Rudge's hand. She organized his funeral in the cemetery on the Isola di San Michele, Venice. After his death Rudge acquired a large archive of his papers and artifacts. Dorothy Pound died the following year, leaving Rudge the last member of the ménage à trois to carry Pound's torch.

== Alone in Venice ==
Rudge was 77 years old when Pound died, the beginning of the final phase of her life. She became one of Venice's resident celebrities, quick-witted, intelligent, and cultured. She sat on many committees organizing the city's many charities and galas. She was an essential guest at the city's profuse "dolce vita" gatherings, but continued to inhabit the same small house she had shared with Pound. Encouraging young aspiring poets and artists, she often offered them free use of the top floor of her home in return for a small painting or dedicated poem. Frequently asked to write an autobiography, she always replied "Write about Pound." She saw it as her raison d'être to promote Pound's work and defend his reputation against charges of antisemitism and fascism.

Rudge's relationship with her daughter Maria had always been complex: at the time of the birth, Rudge had in fact wanted a son. Having boarded the child with Tyrolean farmers at birth, Rudge was later surprised to find the child developed into "a dialect speaking farm girl". Rudge tried to rectify this situation upon being permanently reunited with Maria when the child was ten. Elocution, etiquette, and music lessons were met with fierce opposition; a violin that Rudge gave to her daughter was smashed against a chicken coop: in short, Maria found her mother distant, impenetrable, and authoritarian. Her relationship with her father was better. She learned of her illegitimacy only in her late teens. Pound asked Maria to translate his epic work The Cantos into Italian. This was to be the beginning of a lifelong passion and study of Pound's work, with Maria, soon to be known as Mary, later referring to The Cantos as "my bible".

Mary wrote her autobiography Discretions in 1971 (the title being a play on words on Pound's autobiography Indiscretions). The revelations contained in the book "deeply hurt" Rudge, and she and her daughter did not communicate for several years, although she remained in regular contact with Mary's children, Siegfried Walter de Rachewiltz and Patrizia de Rachewiltz de Vroom. Mother and daughter later overcame their estrangement. Rudge had to become dependent on friends and acquaintances for the necessities of life. In later life, her memory began to fail her.

=== Ezra Pound Foundation ===
It had always been Rudge's intention to set up a foundation of some kind to house Pound's archives, but this was a task she always deferred, while continuing to assist scholars of his work and organize several exhibitions devoted to him. In 1986, Rudge together with an American friend, Jane Rylands, and an attorney from Cleveland, Ohio, formed the "Ezra Pound Foundation". She sold most of her archive and her house to the Foundation for a sum of approximately seven thousand dollars. After the establishment of the Foundation, Rudge's family alleged that this had not been her intention, and that the house and archive were worth considerably more. Part of the problem was that, aged 91, Rudge was becoming forgetful of things she had agreed to.

In April 1988, she wrote to the Cleveland attorney informing him of her wish to dissolve the Foundation. The reply told her that such a request was not within the law. The papers were later deposited in the Beinecke Rare Book and Manuscript Library, Yale University, where they are housed today, and the Ezra Pound Foundation was dissolved. One box of papers concerning the transfer of the archive from the Ezra Pound Foundation is withheld from public viewing.

=== Final years ===
At the time of the creation of the Ezra Pound Foundation, Rudge's friends were becoming increasingly concerned for her. Sculptor Joan Fitzgerald contacted Rudge's daughter, and Rudge's son-in-law and grandson immediately came to Venice. They found that ownership of her house "The Hidden Nest" had not yet been conveyed to the Foundation and were able to recover it, but the archive, containing letters not only from Pound but from other great literary figures of the day, had passed from her ownership. Rudge continued for a short while to live at "The Hidden Nest" until old age and infirmity forced her to leave Venice and make her final home with her daughter at Schloss Brunnenburg. Her family – her daughter, two grandchildren and four great-grandsons – were protective of her, and it was at their home that Rudge died, aged 100, on March 15, 1996.

She was buried with Pound in Venice. Joan Fitzgerald, a close friend of the couple, engraved on their simple tombstones the verse "O God, what great kindness have we done in times past and forgotten it, That thou givest this wonder unto us, O God of waters?" (Night Litany). An alternative epitaph to Rudge could have been that written by Pound in 1966 and intended to be placed at the end of the final Canto:

That her acts
Olga's acts
of beauty
be remembered.

Her name was courage
and is written Olga.

== Legacy ==
Rudge was fiercely proud always to have been financially independent of Pound, and continued her career as a concert violinist until the Second World War. Her advocacy of the works of Vivaldi, which included publishing a catalogue of his works and an article in the Grove Dictionary of Music, did much to establish his modern-day popularity. She publicised 309 Vivaldi concertos which had either been lost or forgotten and were found by professor Alberto Gentili of Biblioteca Nazionale di Torino. However, it is as Pound's muse, lover, and champion that she is chiefly remembered today. Anne Conover's book Olga Rudge and Ezra Pound (2001) is one of the few to credit Rudge for her own endeavours as well as her role of muse to Ezra Pound. Shortly before his death, Pound wrote of Rudge:

There is more courage in Olga's little finger than in the whole of my carcass ... she kept me alive for ten years, for which no one will thank her. The true story will not be told until her version is known.

== Sources ==
- Anne Conover (2001). Olga Rudge and Ezra Pound. New Haven, CT: Yale University Press; ISBN 0-300-08703-9.
- John Berendt (2005). The City of Falling Angels. New York: Penguin Press; ISBN 1-59420-058-0
- Olga Rudge Papers. Yale Collection of American Literature, Beinecke Rare Book and Manuscript Library.
- M E Grenander. BOOK REVIEW: Pull down thy Vanity: Psychiatry and its Discontents

=== Notes ===
1. Barbara C. Eastman, Literary Review of Canada describes her as "gifted".
2. A. David Moody, author of Thomas Stearns Eliot: Poet describes her as possessing a "talent".
3. Rudge Papers, Yale.
4. Rudge Papers, Yale.
5. Conover.
6. Rudge Papers, Yale.
7. The incomplete manuscript is in Box 115, folders 2814–24 Rudge Papers, Yale.
8. Berendt.
9. Grenander.
10. Grenander.
11. Berendt.
12. Grenander.
13. Grenander.
14. Conover.
15. Berendt.
16. Berendt.
17. Berendt.
18. Berendt page 183. a more detailed description of Berendt's views.
19. Berendt.
20. Berendt.
21. Berendt.
22. Conover.
