= Igor de Rachewiltz =

Italian historian and philologist

Igor de Rachewiltz (April 11, 1929 – July 30, 2016) was an Italian historian and philologist specializing in Mongol studies.

Igor de Rachewiltz was born in Rome, the son of Bruno Guido and Antonina Perosio, and brother of Boris de Rachewiltz. The de Rachewiltz family was of noble roots. His grand-grand grandmother or perhaps grand-grandmother was a Tatar from Kazan in central Russia who claimed lineage from the Golden Horde. In 1947, he read Michael Prawdin's Tschingis-Chan und seine Erben ("Genghis Khan and his Heritage") and became interested in learning the Mongolian language. He graduated with a law degree from a university in Rome and pursued Oriental studies in Naples.

In the early 1950s, de Rachewiltz went to Australia on scholarship. He earned his PhD in Chinese history from Australian National University, Canberra in 1961. His dissertation was on Genghis Khan's secretary, 13th-century Khitan scholar Yelü Chucai. He married Ines Adelaide Brasch in 1956; they had one daughter.

Starting in 1965 he became a fellow at the Department of Far Eastern History, Australian National University (1965–67). He made a research trip to Europe (1966–67). He published a translation of the Secret History of the Mongols in eleven volumes of Papers on Far Eastern History (1971–1985). He became a senior Fellow of the Division of Pacific and Asian History at the Australian National University (1967–94), a research-only fellowship. He completed projects by prominent Mongolists Antoine Mostaert and Henri Serruys after their deaths. He was a visiting professor at the Sapienza University of Rome three times (1996, 1999, 2001). In 2004, he published his translation of the Secret History with Brill Publishers; it was selected by Choice as Outstanding Academic Title (2005) and is now in its second edition. In 2007 he donated his personal library of around 6000 volumes to the Scheut Memorial Library.

Late in his life, de Rachewiltz was an emeritus Fellow in the Pacific and Asian History Division of the Australian National University. His research interests included the political and cultural history of China and Mongolia in the thirteenth and fourteenth centuries, East-West political and cultural contacts, and Sino-Mongolian philology generally. In 2015, de Rachewiltz published an open access version of his previous translation, The Secret History of the Mongols: A Mongolian Epic Chronicle of the Thirteenth Century, that is a full translation but omits the extensive footnotes of his previous translations.

Igor de Rachewiltz died on July 30, 2016. He was 87.

== Bibliography ==
- (trans.) The Secret History of the Mongols: A Mongolian Epic Chronicle of the Thirteenth Century (11 December 2015).
- (ed. and trans.) The Secret History of the Mongols, Inner Asian Library, 7:1–2, 2004; 2nd ed., 2006.
- “The Identification of Geographical Names in The Secret History of the Mongols,” Sino Asiatica: Papers dedicated to Professor Liu Ts’un-yan on the occasion of his eighty-fifth birthday, Faculty of Asian Studies, The Australian National University, 2002.
- “The Name of the Mongols in Asia and Europe : A Reappraisal,” Conférence internationale permanente des études altaiques : Chantilly, 20–24 juin 1994, 1997.
- The Mongolian Tanjur Version of the Bodhicaryāvatāra, Harrassowitz Verlag, 1996.
- (with M. Wang, C.C. Hsiao and S. Rivers) Repertory of Proper Names in Yüan Literary Sources. SMC Publishing Inc., Taipei, 1988–1996.
- (commentaries; ed. with Anthony Schönbaum) Le material mongol Houa I I iu de Houng-ou (1389) by Antoine Mostaert, 1977–1995.
- (with H.L. Chan, C.C. Hsiao and P.W. Geier, with the assistance of M. Wang) In the Service of the Khan: Eminent Personalities of the Early Mongol-Yüan Period (1200–1300), Harrassowitz Verlag, Wiesbaden, 1993.
- (with Ssanang Ssetsen, Chungtaidschi, and John Krueger) Erdeni-yin tobci [Precious Summary: a Mongolian Chronicle of 1662], Australian National University: Faculty of Asian Studies, 1990–1991.
- The Third Chapter of Chos-kyi od-zer's Translation of the Bodhicaryavatara: A Tentative Reconstruction, Instituto italiano per il Medio ed Estremo Oriente, 1988.
- “The Preclassical Mongolian Version of the Hsiao-ching,” Zentralasiatische Studien 16 (1982): 7–109.
- Index to The Secret History of the Mongols, Indiana University Publications Uralic and Altaic Series, Vol. 121, 1972.
- Prester John and Europe’s Discovery of East Asia, Australian National University Press, 1972.
- Papal Envoys to the Great Khans, Stanford University Press, 1971.
- “Personnel and Personalities in North China in the Early Mongol Period,” Journal of the Economic and Social History of the Orient 9 (1966): 1–2.
  - De Rachewiltz, Igor. 1966. “Personnel and Personalities in North China in the Early Mongol Period”. Journal of the Economic and Social History of the Orient 9 (1/2). BRILL: 88–144. doi:10.2307/3596174.
- "The Hsi-yu lu by Yeh-lü Ch'u-ts'ai," Monumenta Serica 21 (1962): 1–128.
- "Buddhist Idealist and Confucian Statesman," Confucian Personalities, Stanford University Press, 1962.

== Sources ==
- "Igor de Rachewiltz", Research School of Pacific and Asian Studies (RSPAS), Australian National University (ANU)
- "Igor de Rachewiltz", Ferdinand Verbiest Institute, Katholieke Universiteit Leuven
- "Igor de Rachewiltz memorial page with many downloadable works", Monumenta altaica
