= Boris de Rachewiltz =

Italian Egyptologist

Boris de Rachewiltz

Boris de Rachewiltz (born as Luciano Baratti) (1926–1997) was an Italian Egyptologist and writer on Africa and the ancient world.

== Biography ==
Boris de Rachewiltz, brother of the historian Igor de Rachewiltz, married Mary, the daughter of Ezra Pound and Olga Rudge, in 1946. He studied Egyptology at the Pontifical Biblical Institute in Rome from 1951 to 1955, and at the Cairo University from 1955 to 1957. After archaeological and ethnographic fieldwork in Upper Egypt and the Sudan, he taught as a professor at the Pontifical Urban University.

Under the alias Brando he worked as an informant for the Italian domestic intelligence agency SISDE. Defendant in 1994 in a trial of extreme right-wing militants, he was later acquitted for not having committed the act. De Rachewiltz died in 1997.

== Works ==
- Massime degli antichi egiziani (1954) as Maxims of the Ancient Egyptians (1987) translated by Guy Davenport
- Liriche amorose degli antichi egiziani (1955)
- Il libro dei morti degli antichi egiziani (1958)
- Incantesimi e scongiuri degli antichi egiziani (1958)
- The rock tomb of Irw-K3-Pth. (1960)
- Incontro con l'arte Africana (1959) as Introduction to African Art (1966) translated by Peter Whigham
- An Introduction to Egyptian Art (1960) translated by R. H. Boothroyd
- Vita nell'antico Egitto (1962)
- Black Eros: Sexual Customs of Africa from Prehistory to the Present Day (1964)
- La Valle dei Re e delle Regine (Forma e colore: 37) (1965)
- Processo in verso (1973)
- Sesso magico nell'Africa nera (1983)
- Gli antichi Egizi. Immagini, scene e documenti di vita quotidiana (1987)
- L'occhio del faraone. (1990) with Valenti Gomez i Oliver
- 7 Greeks (1995) with Guy Davenport
- Roma Egizia. Culti, templi e devinità egizie nella Roma Imperiale (1999) with Anna Maria Partini
- I miti egizi (2000)
