= Tim Redman =

American professor

Tim Redman is Professor Emeritus of Literary Studies at the University of Texas at Dallas. The author of Ezra Pound and Italian Fascism (1991), his research focuses on Ezra Pound and more generally on American and British modernism. He retired as Professor of Literary Studies in 2019.

Redman was awarded a Ph.D. in Comparative Literature from the University of Chicago in 1987.

Also a prominent chess player, Redman served twice as president of the United States Chess Federation (USCF), for the terms 1981–1984 and 2000–2001. He is also a FIDE International Arbiter.
