= Dorothy Shakespear =

English painter

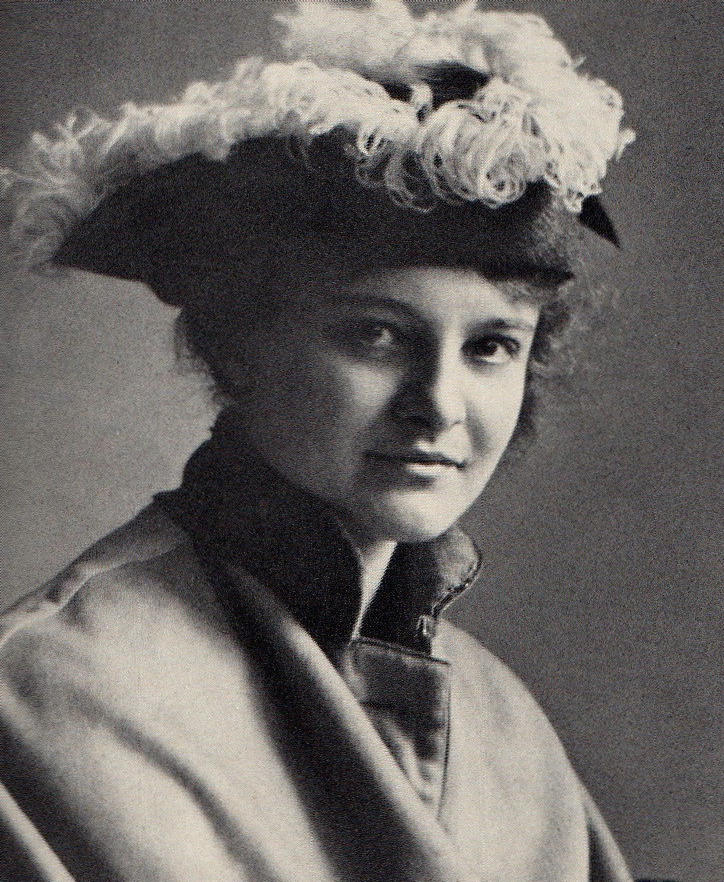
- Shakespear c. 1910 – c. 1920
- Born: 14 September 1886; London, England
- Died: 8 December 1973 (aged 87); London, England
- Known for: Painting
- Movement: Vorticism
- Spouse: Ezra Pound (m. 1914)
- Mother: Olivia Shakespear

Dorothy Shakespear (14 September 1886 – 8 December 1973) was an English artist. She was the daughter of novelist Olivia Shakespear and the wife of American poet Ezra Pound. One of a small number of women vorticist painters, her art work was published in BLAST, the short-lived but influential literary magazine.

Dorothy and Pound first met in 1909 in London, and after a long courtship the two married in 1914. They lived in Paris from 1920 until 1924, and in 1925 settled in Rapallo, Italy. Despite her husband's 50-year affair with Olga Rudge, whom he met in Paris in the early 1920s, Dorothy stayed married to Pound. In 1926 she gave birth to a son Omar Pound, who was raised in England by her mother. By the 1930s she received a number of family bequests, making her financially independent, but lost much of her money by following Pound's advice to invest in Benito Mussolini's Fascist regime.

Toward the end of World War II, Dorothy and Pound were evacuated from their home in Rapallo, and for a period she lived with Pound in Rudge's home. After the war, when Pound had been arrested for treason and incarcerated on grounds of insanity in Washington, D.C., she moved there, visiting daily, taking control of his estate, and staying with him until his release. They returned to Italy in 1958; in 1961 she moved to London, leaving her husband to live out the last decade of his life with Olga Rudge.

== Early years ==
Dorothy's parents both came from British Indian Army families. Her mother Olivia Shakespear, born on the Isle of Wight, lived her early years in Sussex and later in London where she and her sister Florence were raised to live a life of leisure. In 1885 she married Henry Hope Shakespear (1849–1923), who traced his family line to 17th-century East London rope makers and, like his wife, came from a military family. Educated at Harrow, he went on to study law, became a barrister, and in 1875 joined a law practice. The couple's only child Dorothy was born nine months after the two were married. Dorothy's mother, a minor novelist, was active in London literary circles for much of her life.

From her father Dorothy learned to paint, with the two going to the countryside for regularly scheduled painting excursions. She attended Hampshire Boarding School and for a short period a Geneva finishing school, after which she lived in her parents' home, keeping herself occupied with water-colour painting, reading, letter writing, and accompanying her mother on social visits. Ezra Pound biographer Wilhelm describes her as a "bright, pert, pretty English girl with a winning smile although some people found her cold", and Humphrey Carpenter says that she lived a sheltered life before meeting Pound.

== Courtship ==
Dorothy met Pound at her own home on 16 February 1909 when her mother, who had recently met the young American poet at a friend's salon in Kensington, invited him to tea. Although Olivia was more than 20 years older than Pound, she was a beautiful woman, and influential in London literary society, to whom Pound may have been attracted. But it was Dorothy, a year younger than Pound, who was struck by his presence, writing in her diary on the very day she met him:

Listen to it—Ezra! Ezra! And a third time—Ezra! He has a wonderful, beautiful face, a high forehead, prominent over the eyes; a long delicate nose, with little, red, nostrils; a strange mouth, never still & quite elusive; a square chin, slightly cleft in the middle—the whole face pale; the eyes grey-blue; the hair golden-brown, and curling in soft wavy crinkles. Large grotesque eyes, with long, well-shaped fingers and beautiful nails.

Many years later she would tell Ezra Pound biographer Noel Stock that her memory of the visit "was very hazy, all she could remember was that it was winter and she sat on a low stool near the fire and listened".

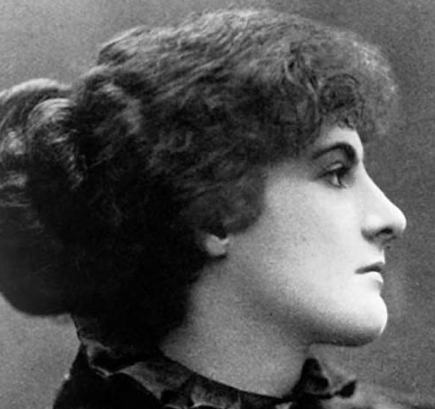
Dorothy's mother, Olivia Shakespear, introduced Pound to her daughter in 1909.

From her mother, she gained an interest in theosophy and mysticism. With her best friend and cousin, Georgie Hyde-Lees, she joined the Order of the Golden Dawn. Most specifically Dorothy was interested in astrology and asked Pound for his exact moment of birth to prepare an astrology chart. In her notebook she wrote: "You are very broad-minded—too much so. Very artistic. All for colour. Very sensitive—over-sensitive. At a very great turning point in life....you will marry twice & have two children."

In late 1909 and early 1910, chaperoned by her mother, Dorothy attended Pound's lectures at the London Polytechnic Institute; in June 1910, mother and daughter went to Italy and joined him in Sirmione for a few weeks. Dorothy spent the time painting, becoming enthralled with Lake Garda, as was Pound, claiming it was the first time she had seen color. She would later write to Pound that the days spent in Sirmione were deeply profound; according to Pound's biographer John Tytell, for the next two decades the watercolors she painted were of that location in Italy. Dorothy likely considered herself engaged to Pound after the Italian trip.

Olivia restricted contact between the two after the trip. Days before Pound was to leave for an extended stay in the US, Dorothy wrote him promising to abide by her mother's stricture and exhorting him to follow her lead: "In case I do not see you alone on Wednesday, I take it that during your 'exile' you have been forbidden to write to me?.... if you have promised—don't break your word—don't write to me!" Olivia allowed Dorothy to write a thank-you note when Pound's Canzoni were published—that he dedicated to Olivia and Dorothy—the only instance when she let Dorothy contact him directly. John Harwood, Olivia Shakespear's biographer, writes that Dorothy's lack of resistance seems extreme, even by Edwardian standards; however, he speculates that Olivia's motives were to keep Dorothy's behaviour controlled, whereas Pound's behaviour was ignored.

== Engagement ==
The two remained unofficially engaged until 1914, with Dorothy adhering to social convention and waiting for her father's permission to marry. In 1911 Pound returned from America and in October formally approached Dorothy's father asking permission to marry her. Pound told Shakespear he had a guaranteed annual income of £200 in addition to earnings from writing and Dorothy's own income of £150 a year. Shakespear refused on the grounds of insufficient income believing Pound overstated his potential to earn money writing poetry. At the same time, Hilda Doolitle arrived from America, believing herself to be engaged to Pound. Walter Rummel, with whom Pound was sharing a room while he waited for his old rooms at Church Walk to be vacated, told Hilda about Dorothy a few days before Pound asked permission to marry Dorothy. During that period Olivia invited Hilda to her home to meet her, and was concerned about the tension between Dorothy, Hilda and Pound, as well as her daughter's apparent obsession with Pound. Olivia continued to restrict contact between the two while Dorothy continued to treat the relationship as an engagement, despite short weekly or bi-weekly supervised visits in the family drawing room.

Throughout the nearly five-year-long courtship, Dorothy and Pound corresponded regularly, filling their letters with gossip about mutual acquaintances such as T.E. Hulme, Violet Hunt, Walter Rummel, Florence Farr, and Henri Gaudier-Brzeska; additionally in their letters they shared trivial incidents, family information, and showed affection for one another. They were separated for long periods each year when the Shakespear family visited friends and extended family (mostly members of the Tucker family) in the country, returning to London only for a few months in the spring and autumn—customary for many Victorian families. Generally young women of the period were expected to indulge in activities such as painting, embroidery and music while waiting for marriage. Dorothy, however, through the influence of her mother, was well read (and quite capable of conversing with Pound who had multiple degrees), knowledgeable in music, and a talented artist. She became a skilled artist and during the vorticist period was capable of conversing easily with artists such as Wyndham Lewis whom she met at her mother's salon.

== Marriage ==
Olivia realised her 27-year-old daughter was determined to marry Pound and in 1914 allowed the two to marry although Pound was earning less than in 1911 when he made the first proposal. On 20 April 1914, Dorothy married Pound despite her father's opposition—he relented when the couple agreed to a church rather than a civil ceremony. The marriage ceremony took place at St Mary Abbots, Kensington, in the morning with six guests in attendance; official witnesses were the bride's father and her uncle Henry Tucker. As a wedding present Olivia gave them two circus drawings by Pablo Picasso.

Cover of Ripostes designed by Dorothy Shakespear

Dorothy and Pound moved into an apartment at 5 Holland Place, with Hilda Doolittle, recently married to Richard Aldington, living in the adjacent apartment. Hilda was shocked and hurt when Pound married Dorothy, and even more shocked to find he rented the apartment opposite at Holland Place. She and Dorothy were not on friendly terms, with Hilda writing of her, "she is unbearably critical and never has been known to make a warm friend with a man or woman. She loathes (she says) children! However, that may be a little pose. She is a bit addictive to little mannerisms. I don't think she can be poignantly sensitive or she would never have stuck Ezra." When Dorothy came to [?] in the small apartment, she refused to cook—ever. In fact, she never cooked until she was forced to during World War II. Pound cooked in the larger room and worked in a small, better-lit room. He made furniture for the apartment where they stayed until 1919.

Although Dorothy and Ezra planned to honeymoon in Spain that September, the outbreak of World War I forced them to postpone. Instead they lived with W. B. Yeats at Stone Cottage for the winter, where Pound worked on proofs for the second issue of BLAST magazine. Of Dorothy, Yeats wrote, "She looks as if her face were made out of Dresden china. I look at her in perpetual wonder. It is hard to believe she is real; yet she spends all her daylight hours drawing the most monstrous cubist pictures." Poet Iris Barry, writing in the 1930s about the Pounds during this period, describes Dorothy as, "With [Ezra] came Mrs. Pound, carrying herself delicately with the air, always of a young Victorian lady out skating, and a profile as clear and lovely as that as a porcelain Kuan-yin."

From her father she learned landscape art, but by 1913 her art showed influences of Japanese prints. Additionally, she was influenced by exposure to artists such as Wyndham Lewis and Henri Gaudier-Brzeska and by 1914 had assumed her own abstract Vorticist style. In 1915, she designed the cover art for Ezra's volume of poetry, Ripostes, and she designed Chinese characters to add to his manuscripts. Her work was simply signed as "D.S." and never exhibited.

To promote the first issue of BLAST, Dorothy walked along Tottenham Court Road holding the magazine.

== Paris and Italy ==
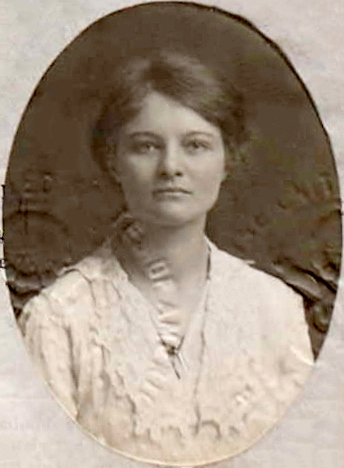
Passport photo of Dorothy Shakespear, July 1919

Ezra Pound by E.O. Hoppé (1920, the year he and Dorothy moved to Paris.)

Dorothy and Pound moved to Paris in 1920 where they first lived in a hotel until renting a studio at 70 bis rue de Notre Dame des Champs, a small street near the Dôme Café. With a letter of introduction from Sherwood Anderson, Hemingway secured an invitation to tea for himself and his wife Hadley, who found Dorothy's manners to be intimidating, saying of their apartment that it was as "poor as Gertrude Stein's studio was rich". Nonetheless they forged a firm friendship that lasted many years, with Dorothy turning to Hemingway for help in the early 1950s, during Pound's incarceration at St. Elizabeths.

During this period Pound edited and Dorothy worked as business manager for the four volume literary magazine, The Exile, featuring works by Pound himself, Hemingway, and others.

In 1923, Pound met classical violinist Olga Rudge, with whom he fell in love and had a relationship until his death. A year later, in 1924, Dorothy and Pound left Paris for Italy to allow Ezra time to recuperate after suffering from appendicitis. They stayed in Rapallo briefly, moving on to Sicily, and then returning to settle in Rapallo in January 1925. On 9 July 1925 Olga gave birth to their child Mary, in the Italian Tyrol. Dorothy was separated from Pound for much of that year and the next; she joined her mother in Siena in the autumn, and then went to Egypt from December 1925 to March 1926, returning pregnant to Rapallo. In Paris in June for the opening of Pound's opera Le Testament de Villon, Dorothy decided to stay and to have the child at the American Hospital. Because Pound was away when the child was born Hemingway brought Dorothy to the hospital. Omar Pound was born in the afternoon of 10 September 1926. Dorothy kept the boy with her for only a short time; before his second birthday she sent him to London where Olivia raised him with Dorothy visiting frequently.

When Olivia died in 1938 she left a substantial income to Dorothy. In 1931 Olivia doubled Dorothy's income, who by that time had additional income in the form of various family bequests and dividends from investments. With her husband earning as little as £50 annually, the Pounds lived on Dorothy's income. Olivia set up a stock account for her which was soon depleted because she followed Pound's advice to invest in Italian stock. She inherited £16,000 from her mother, but during the war the money was inaccessible with assets from England prohibited from being sent to an Axis country. As a result, during the war years the couple relied solely on Pound's income, for the first time since their marriage.

In 1941 on two separate occasions, Pound tried to leave Italy with Dorothy: once he was denied passage by plane, the second time they were refused passage on a diplomatic train out of the country. In 1944 Pound and Dorothy were evacuated from their home for being too near the coast. Pound wanted Dorothy to stay in Rapallo and care for his mother, Isabel, while he lived with Olga. Dorothy insisted on staying with her husband—for a year the three lived together. Olga took a job at an Ursuline school; Dorothy—who had not learned Italian after almost two decades in the country—was forced to learn to shop and cook.

== Later years ==
On 25 November 1945, Pound was arraigned in Washington, D.C., on charges of treason. The list included broadcasting for the enemy, attempting to persuade American citizens to undermine government support for the war, and strengthening Italian morale against the United States. Pound was ill at the arraignment and remanded to a Washington, D.C., hospital where he underwent psychiatric evaluation. A week later he was admitted to St. Elizabeths hospital and assigned to a lunatic ward until February 1947. Unable to renew her passport, Dorothy only arrived in the US in June, at which point her husband, then declared 'legally incompetent', was placed in her charge. She was allowed infrequent visits until his move to Chestnut Ward the following year—the result of an appeal she initiated. She moved into a dreary apartment where she lived for 12 years, visiting her husband each afternoon. Tytell writes that she had "generally a calming, soothing influence." She typed his letters, acted as his confidante, shielded him from unwanted visitors, and led conversations amongst the visitors who flocked to visit the poet, particularly in the 1950s. However she failed to keep Pound from "himself" as Tytell writes, unable to prevent her husband's friendship with far-right activists such as John Kasper. Furthermore, Pound remained interested in other women. He was visited at Chestnut Ward by Sheri Martinelli, a former model according to Tytell, about whom Dorothy complained in a letter to the hospital's superintendent Winfred Overholser. Martinelli was then replaced with Marcella Spann, "a naive young English teacher from a small town in Texas".

In April 1958, Archibald MacLeish instigated the campaign for Pound's release, which was successful. He stayed on at St. Elizabeths for the next month, waiting for a passport, packing books and papers that were stored in Dorothy's apartment, leaving the hospital early in May. In June Dorothy and her husband, traveling with Marcella, now acting nominally as Pound's secretary, boarded a ship for Italy. Upon their arrival they were met in Verona by Mary, Pound's daughter with Olga, and from there they traveled to her home in South Tyrol, Schloss Brunnenburg. In January 1959 tensions between the three women became intolerable. Dorothy, who lived in her own section of the castle, maintained legal guardianship and controlled his funds. A few months later, Dorothy took Pound and Marcella to Rapallo to visit Olga, and then traveled through Italy. In Sirmione, Pound began to talk about marrying Marcella, and Dorothy used her legal power: by the end of the summer, Marcella, 40 years younger than Pound, had been sent back to the US. Pound fell into a period of ill-health in 1960 that lingered through the early months of 1961. Dorothy eventually brought him to Rapallo, and unable to cope with him, she turned his care over to Olga.

Dorothy returned to London where she lived until the end of her life. When in 1970, Noel Stock published what was meant to be definitive biography of her husband's life, Dorothy approved the final version. Pound died in Venice 1972 but she did not attend the funeral. She died a year later, in 1973.

== Vorticist ==
The Nasher Museum of Art at Duke University held an exhibition entitled The Vorticists: Rebel Artists in London and New York, 1914–18 from 30 September 2010 through 2 January 2011 including a painting by Shakespear.

== Notes ==
=== Sources ===
- Carpenter, Humphrey (1988). A serious character: the life of Ezra Pound. London: Faber and Faber. ISBN 978-0-571-14786-1.
- Carpenter, Humphrey (1988). Geniuses together: American writers in Paris in the 1920s (1st American ed.). Boston: Houghton Mifflin Co. ISBN 978-0-395-46416-8.
- Tryphonopoulos, Demetres P.; Adams, Stephen, eds. (2005). The Ezra Pound encyclopedia. Westport, Conn: Greenwood Press. ISBN 978-0-313-30448-4.
- Dennis, Helen M. "Pound, women and gender". Nadel, Ira Bruce (2007). The Cambridge introduction to Ezra Pound. Cambridge introductions to literature. Cambridge: Cambridge university press. ISBN 978-0-521-85391-0.
- Harwood, John (1989). Olivia Shakespear and W.B. Yeats: after long silence. New York: St. Martin's Press. ISBN 978-0-312-03458-0.
- Moody, Anthony David (2007). Ezra Pound, poet: a portrait of the man & his work. Oxford; New York: Oxford University Press. ISBN 978-0-19-921557-7.
- Nadel, Ira Bruce (2007). The Cambridge introduction to Ezra Pound. Cambridge introductions to literature. Cambridge: Cambridge university press. ISBN 978-0-521-85391-0.
- Nadel, Ira Bruce, ed. (2010). Ezra Pound in context. Cambridge, UK; New York: Cambridge University Press. ISBN 978-0-521-51507-8.
- O'Connor, William. Ezra Pound. University of Minnesota Press, 1963
- Pound, Omar. "Pound, Omar". in Tryphonopoulos, Demetres P.; Adams, Stephen, eds. (2005). The Ezra Pound encyclopedia. Westport, Conn: Greenwood Press. ISBN 978-0-313-30448-4.
- Reynolds, Ann, E. Ezra Pound and Dorothy Shakespear: Their Letters 1909–1914. MagillOnLiterature. 1985
- Stock, Noel (1982). The life of Ezra Pound (Expanded ed.). San Francisco: North Point Press. ISBN 978-0-86547-075-0.
- Tytell, John (2004). Ezra Pound: the solitary volcano. Chicago: Ivan R. Dee. ISBN 978-1-56663-559-2.
- Wilhelm, James J. Ezra Pound in London and Paris, 1908–1925. The University of Pennsylvania State Press. 2008 ISBN 978-0-271-02798-2
