= Richard Rathbun =

American biologist and administrator

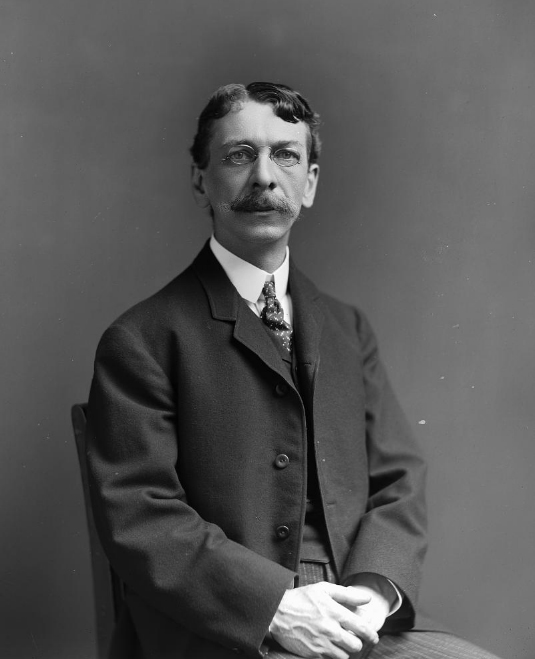

Richard Rathbun (January 25, 1852 – July 16, 1918) was an American biologist and administrator at the Smithsonian Institution.

== Biography ==
Richard Rathbun was born in Buffalo, New York, to Charles Rathbun and his wife Marey (née Furey). He was schooled in Buffalo before joining his father's quarrying company, Whitmore and Rathbun, for four years. He was fascinated by fossils, and soon amassed a large collection. When he offered it to the Buffalo Society of Natural History, they decided to appoint him curator, and this marked the beginning of Richard's scientific career.

In 1871, Rathbun entered Cornell University, going on to be an assistant in zoology at the Boston Society of Natural History two years later. In 1874 and 1875, he spent the summer assisting the work of the United States Fish Commission, a division of the Smithsonian Institution. He was appointed the official geologist of an expedition to Brazil to investigate its natural resources. The expedition was cut short after two years when yellow fever broke out, killing the head of the expedition and debilitating Rathbun.

On his return to the United States, Rathbun took up the position of scientific assistant in the U.S. Fish Commission, where he remained for 18 years. During this time, his younger sister, Mary J. Rathbun joined him as a volunteer, starting her illustrious scientific career. In 1880, he became curator of marine invertebrates at the United States National Museum in Washington, D.C. On October 6, 1880, he married Lena Augusta Hume in Eastport, Maine. In 1896, he was made assistant secretary (assisting Samuel Pierpont Langley), and in 1898, he added the directorship of the National Museum to his list of titles. In 1902, he was made president of the Washington Philosophical Society, and in 1905, president of the Cosmos Club. He was also a fellow of the American Association for the Advancement of Science and a member of the Fisheries Society of Finland, the Russian Imperial Society for the Acclimatization of Animals and Plants, the Zoological Society of London, the International Zoological Congress, the International Congress of Applied Chemistry, the Pan American Scientific Congress and others. He was granted honorary degrees by the University of Indiana, Bowdoin College, the University of Pittsburgh and George Washington University.

He died on July 16, 1918, of heart disease resulting from the yellow fever he had suffered 40 years before, and was buried at Rock Creek Cemetery. He was survived by his wife and their only child, the architect Seward Hume Rathbun.

== Work ==
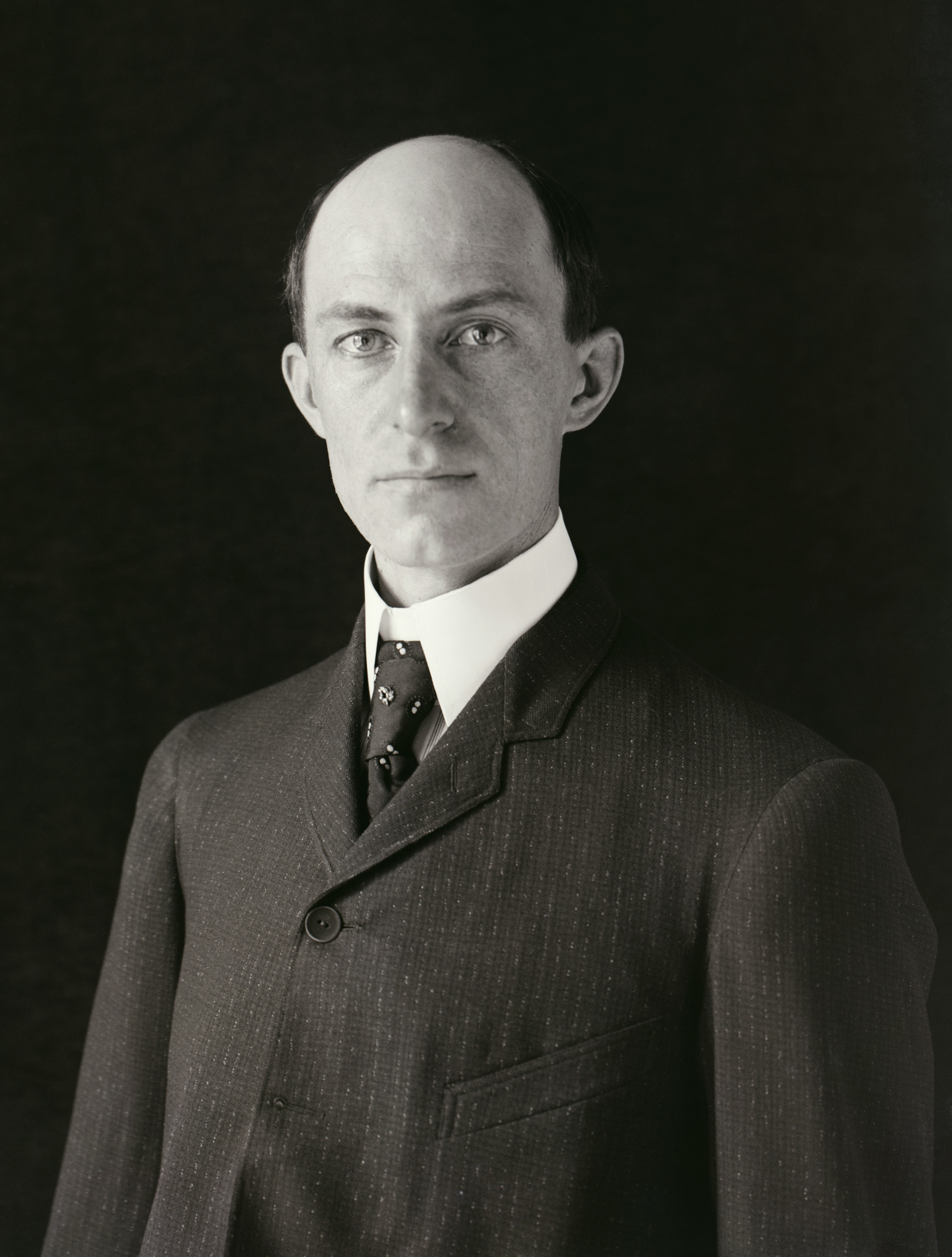
Wilbur Wright sought information on aerodynamics from Rathbun.

Rathbun's scientific work focused on parasitic copepods and fisheries science, especially of crabs, lobsters and fish.

Around 1898, Rathbun, in his position as assistant secretary to the Smithsonian Institution, received a letter from the then-unknown Wilbur Wright requesting information. Rathbun sent him a number of works on aerodynamics, and an invoice for one dollar, which Wilbur promptly paid. Octave Chanute later called this event "the most important exchange of correspondence in the history of the Smithsonian". Orville Wright later stated that this large package from the Smithsonian enabled him and his brother to solve a problem of balance that had caused most previous attempts at heavier-than-air flight to fail.

Richard Rathbun was instrumental in the establishment of the natural history building of the Smithsonian Institution. He was also responsible for what would become the National Collection of Fine Arts, when he oversaw the acquisition of the William T. Evans collection of contemporary American art.

== Honorifics ==
Richard Rathbun was honored for his services to science by David Starr Jordan and Barton Warren Evermann in 1896 when they named the ronquil genus Rathbunella.

Other species in which Rathbun is honored in their binomial include:

- Canda rathbuni (Canu & Bassler, 1920)†
- Turbonilla rathbuni Verrill & Smith, 1880
- Propebela rathbuni Verrill, 1884
- Ophiothrix rathbuni Ludwig, 1882
- Paralithodes rathbuni (J. E. Benedict, 1895)
- Aphyocharax rathbuni Eigenmann, 1907
- Fundulus rathbuni Jordan & Meek, 1889
- Paralonchurus rathbuni (Jordan & Bollman, 1890)
- Pontinus rathbuni Goode & Bean, 1896
- Eurycea rathbuni (Stejneger, 1896)

† = extinct
