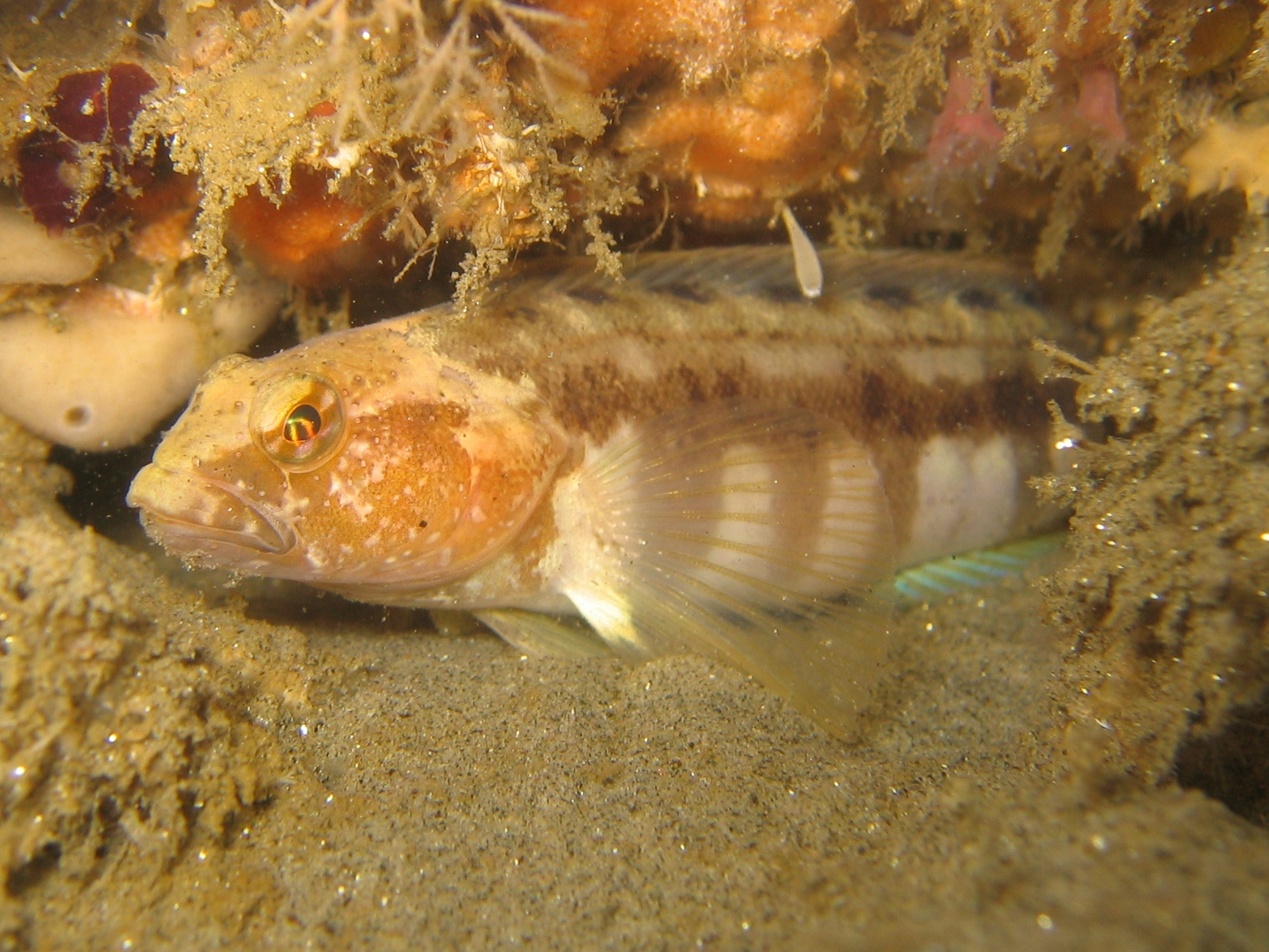
- Stripefin Ronquil (R. hypoplecta)

Scientific classification
- Kingdom: Animalia
- Phylum: Chordata
- Class: Actinopterygii
- Order: Perciformes
- Family: Bathymasteridae
- Genus: Rathbunella; D. S. Jordan & Evermann, 1896

Type species
- Bathymaster hypoplectus Gilbert, 1890

= Rathbunella =

Genus of fishes

Rathbunella is a genus of marine ray-finned fishes belonging to the family Bathymasteridae, the ronquils. These fishes are found in the eastern Pacific Ocean.

== Taxonomy ==
Rathbunella was first proposed as a monotypic genus by the American ichthyologists David Starr Jordan and Barton Warren Evermann in 1896 with Bathymaster hypoplectus, which had been described by Charles Henry Gilbert from Southern California in 1890, as its type species. The genus is classified in the family Bathymasteridae which is in the Scorpaeniform suborder Zoarcoidei. The genus name, Rathbunella, honors Richard Rathbun, who was the chief of the Division of Scientific Inquiry in the United States Fish Commission, in recognition of his services to science.

== Species ==
There are currently two recognized species in this genus:

- Rathbunella alleni Gilbert, 1904
- Rathbunella hypoplecta (Gilbert, 1890) (Stripefin ronquil)

== Characteristics ==
Rathbunella ronquils are distinguished from other genera in the family Bathymasteridae by having the branchiostegal membranes being broadly united, free from isthmus, creating a thick fold. Their gill rakers are short and robust, with small patches of teeth. There are around 100 vomerine teeth which are arranged in concentric arcs which number between 7 and 9. They have between 72 and 88 pored scales in the lateral line. Unlike Bathymaster but like Ronquilus there are scales on the cheeks and crown. The only species for which a maximum published length is given is R. hypoplecta with a total length of 16 cm (6.3 in).

== Distribution, habitat and biology ==
Rathbunella ronquils are found in the eastern North Pacific Ocean where they are distributed from San Francisco Bay in northern California south to Bahia San Carlos in Baja California. They are solitary, demersal fishes of shallow coastal waters in rocky areas. The demersal eggs are guarded by the males.
