= Visits to St. Elizabeths =

Poem

Visits to St Elizabeths is a poem by Elizabeth Bishop modelled on the English nursery rhyme This is the house that Jack built. The poem refers to the confinement between 1945 and 1958 of Ezra Pound in St Elizabeths Hospital, Washington, D.C. The nursery rhyme style gives an unusual effect to the strange or unsettling descriptions of a psychiatric hospital in the poem. Likewise the poem treats Pound ambivalently describing him by turns as "honored", "brave", "cruel", and "wretched" among other things.

The poem draws on Bishop's visits to Pound during the year she spent in Washington as the Consultant in Poetry to the Library of Congress (a position now known as Poet Laureate) in 1949-50. The poem itself was written in 1956.
