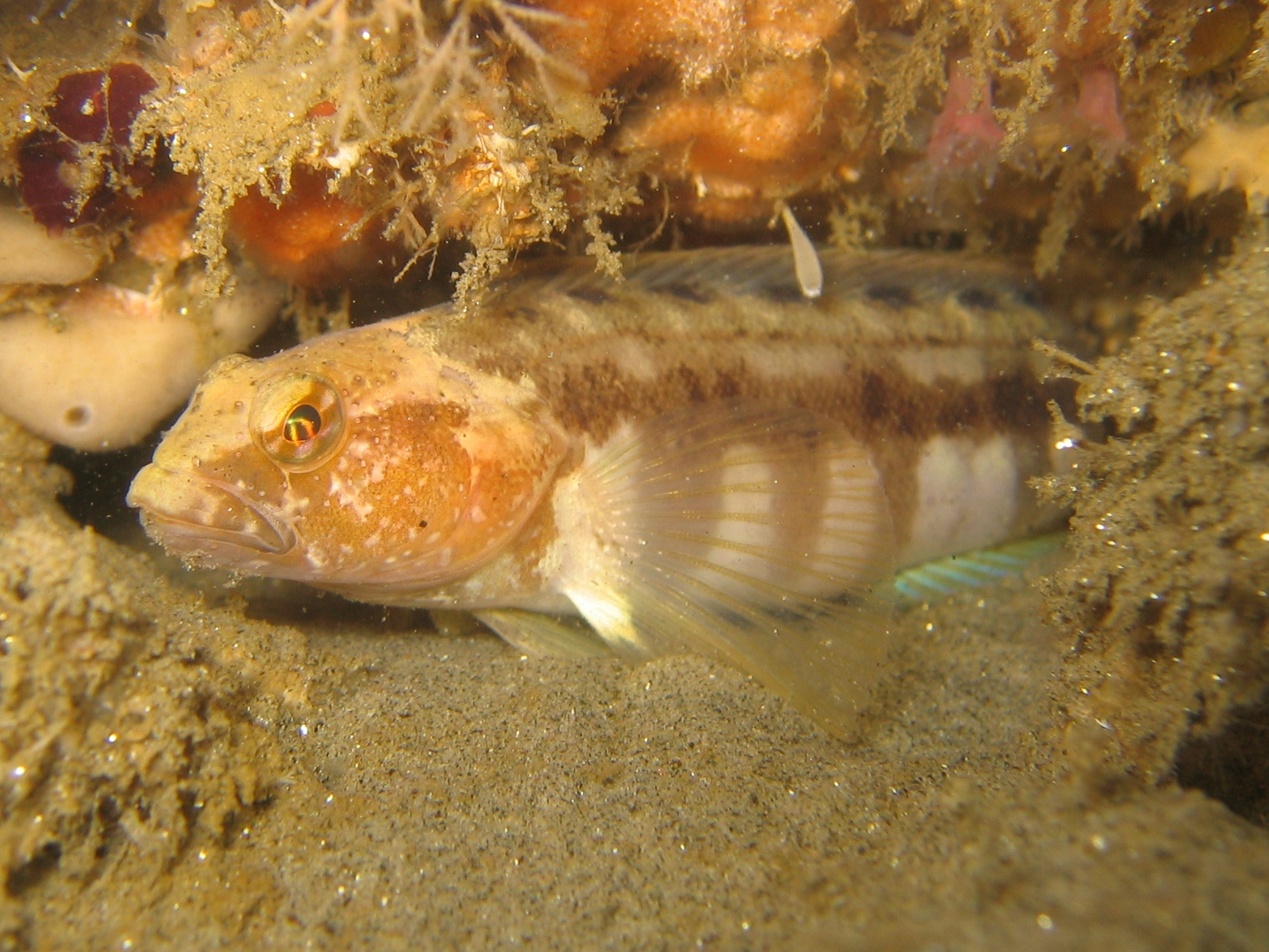
- From Scripps Canyon, La Jolla, CA

Scientific classification
- Kingdom: Animalia
- Phylum: Chordata
- Class: Actinopterygii
- Order: Perciformes
- Family: Bathymasteridae
- Genus: Rathbunella
- Species: R. hypoplecta

Binomial name
- Rathbunella hypoplecta (Gilbert, 1890)

Synonyms
- Bathymaster hypoplectus Gilbert, 1890

= Stripedfin ronquil =

Species of fish

The stripedfin ronquil (Rathbunella hypoplecta), also known as the bluebanded ronquil, is a species of marine ray-finned fish belonging to the family Bathymasteridae, the ronquils. This fish is found in the eastern Pacific Ocean.

== Taxonomy ==
The stripedfin ronquil was first formally described as Bathymaster hypoplectus in 1890 by the American ichthyologist Charles Henry Gilbert with the type locality given as off Southern California. When David Starr Jordan and Barton Warren Evermann proposed the monotypic genus Rathbunella they designated this species as its type species. The specific name hypoplectus is a compound of hypo, which means "under", and "plectus", meaning "plaited", assumed to be a reference to the branchiostegal membranes being broadly united, free from isthmus, creating a thick fold.

== Description ==
The stripedfin ronquil has an elongate body with a shape similar to that of a blenny. The overall color varies from olive brown to dull red, bluish black or purple with paler patches. There is a horizontal blue stripe running along the whole of the anal fin. Males have a number of obvious blotches on their flanks; females are palre with darker blotches and spots on the upper body and pale bars on the lower flanks and have a blue spot on the front part of the dorsal fin. The long anal fin has no spines, 33 rays and is uniform in height along its whole length, the caudal fin is rounded and the dorsal fin contains 46 rays, the first 5 rays being simple and the rest are branched. The dorsal fin also has no spines and is uniform in height. The pectoral fins are large and rounded and pelvic fin are thoracic, having a single spine and 5 rays. The head and body are covered with small smooth scales. The lateral line is clearly visible, located high on the body and runs in a straight line. This species has a maximum published total length of 16 cm (6.3 in).

== Distribution and habitat ==
The stripedfin ronquil is found in the eastern North Pacific Ocean where it is distributed from Santo Tomás, Baja California north to Point Conception in California. This is a solitary, demersal fish found in exposed rocky areas in shalloiw coastal waters down to depths of 178 m (584 ft).

== Biology ==
The stripefin ronquil feeds on invertebrates such as amphipods, copepods, polychaetes, shrimps, and gastropods. Their predators include a variety of larger fish and California sea lions (Zalophus californianus). This is an oviparous species and the females are batch spawning and fertilization is external. The female lays eggs in sheltered places n the rocks and the males guard them.
