= Joseph B. Noil =

Decorated United States Naval sailor

Joseph Benjamin Noil
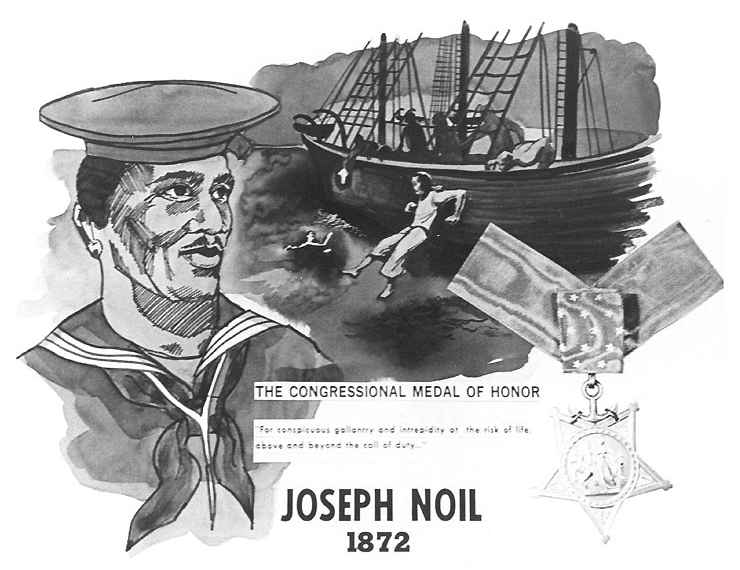
- U.S. Navy poster featuring Joseph Noil
- Born: 1841; Liverpool, Nova Scotia, British North America
- Died: March 21, 1882 (aged 40–41); Washington, D.C., US
- Burial place: Saint Elizabeth's Hospital
- Military career
- Allegiance: United States of America
- Branch: United States Navy
- Rank: Seaman
- Unit: USS Powhatan
- Awards: Medal of Honor

Joseph Benjamin Noil (1841 – March 21, 1882) was a United States Navy sailor and a recipient of America's highest military decoration—the Medal of Honor.

== Military service ==
Joseph B. Noil enlisted in the Navy from New York; when he re-enlisted for three years on December 29, 1874, he was described as thirty-four years old, born in Nova Scotia and of African descent. His civilian occupation was as a caulker, and he was five feet, six inches tall.

While serving on USS Powhatan at Norfolk, Virginia on December 26, 1872, he saved a drowning shipmate, Boatswain James C. Walton. For his conduct on this occasion, he was awarded the Medal of Honor.

On May 25, 1881, Noil, promoted to the rating of Captain of the Hold and serving on the USS Wyoming (1859), was admitted to the Naval Hospital in Norfolk, suffering from "paralysis" (PTSD). About a week later, he was transferred to Saint Elizabeth's Hospital in Washington, D.C., where he died on March 21, 1882, and was buried in the hospital graveyard with his name misspelled as "Noel". His grave was re-discovered in 2011 by the Medal of Honor Historical Society of the United States, a group that has a mission to identify and photograph the "lost" resting places of Medal of Honor recipients. A new headstone, noting that Noil is a Medal of Honor recipient, was dedicated in April 2016, in a ceremony attended by representatives from the Canadian Embassy in Washington and by Noil's great-great-great granddaughter.

== Medal of Honor citation ==
Rank and organization: Seaman, U.S. Navy. Born: 1841, Nova Scotia. Accredited to: New York.

Citation:

Serving on board the U.S.S. Powhatan at Norfolk, 26 December 1872, Noil saved Boatswain J. C. Walton from drowning.

== Personal life ==
Noil married Sarah Jane Gambier of New York City; they had two daughters, Florence Gambier Noil (October 1871 – October 5, 1933) and Sarah Elizabeth Noil (b. January 13, 1876, date of death unknown).

His granddaughter, Cora Hunter Parks, was an actress, dancer, and vaudeville artist who appeared in a number of Broadway shows. As a member of the group The Rhythmettes, she sang "Optimistic Voices" in the 1939 movie The Wizard of Oz, and on Broadway in 1939, again with the Rhythmettes, with Louis Armstrong, Moms Mabley, Oscar Polk and others, she sang and danced in the show Swingin' the Dream.

== See also ==
- List of Medal of Honor recipients during peacetime
- List of African American Medal of Honor recipients
- List of foreign-born Medal of Honor recipients
- Military history of Nova Scotia
- Black Nova Scotians
