= Dolores Lewis Garcia =

Native American potter

- Born: 1938; Acoma Pueblo, New Mexico, USA
- Known for: Pottery
- Style: Traditional Puebloano
- Mother: Lucy M. Lewis

Dolores Lewis Garcia (born 1938) is a Native American potter from Acoma Pueblo, New Mexico, US. She is known for her traditional style. She continues to work at the Acoma Pueblo, producing pottery including the heart-line deer, hoof prints, and other abstract patterns.

== Biography ==
Garcia was born on the Acoma Pueblo in New Mexico, and is one of nine children born to Acoma potter and matriarch Lucy M. Lewis, who taught many of her children the traditional pottery-making process rooted in their ancient tradition, including potters Anne Lewis Hansen, Mary Lewis Garcia, Emma Lewis Mitchell, Drew Lewis, and Carmel Lewis. Garcia was received her early education (1945 to 1955) in the Albuquerque Public School, where she was reprimanded for speaking her Native language. In 1990 she received a fellowship to the Institute for Advanced Study at Indiana University in Bloomington.

=== Work ===
Utilizing the skills taught by her mother, Garcia engages a traditional style when creating her decorative and utilitarian works. She was the first to use Mimbres designs in her work, which was at the suggestion of Dr. Kenneth M. Chapman from the Museum of New Mexico. Garcia is particularly known for her pottery designs such as the heart-line deer, hoof prints, and other abstract patterns. She and her sister Emma are adamant speakers against the use of commercial castware and artificial pigments, and continue to share their work at the Acoma Pueblo through workshops and demonstrations that are offered to the public.

Her work has been featured in numerous collections including "The Legacy of Generations: Pottery by American Indian Women" and "Seven Families in Pubelo Pottery", exhibited at institutions such as Maxwell Museum of Anthropology and the National Museum of Women in the Arts.
