= Frances Wieser =

American scientific illustrator

- Born: Francisca Wieser; 1869; Washington, D.C., U.S.
- Died: January 15, 1949 (aged 79–80); Washington, D.C, U.S.
- Resting place: Glenwood Cemetery, Washington, D.C
- Other names: Frances A. Wieser, Francesca Wieser
- Occupations: Scientific illustrator, drafter, artist, photographic assistant
- Employer(s): United States Geological Survey, United States National Museum

Francisca Wieser, also known as Frances A. Wieser, or Francesca Wieser (1869 – January 15, 1949) was an American scientific illustrator, drafter, artist, and photographic assistant. She worked for the United States Geological Survey, and the United States National Museum (now the National Museum of Natural History) from 1911 to 1929 with the title of "paleontologic draftsman". She was known for her drawings of fossils.

== Biography ==
Francisca A. Wieser was born on 1869 in Washington, D.C., in the United States. She was the daughter of German immigrants, her mother was Sophia Ailer (née Seitz), and her father was a war veteran (1st Maryland Cavalry in the Union Army during the American Civil War) and a visual artist, Louis Wieser (1836–1904). Her younger sister Florence Wieser (1877–1949) also worked as an illustrator and artist at the United States Geological Survey. From early childhood she had a love of creating art.

She served as an artist and illustrator to several departments and for several people, including Ray S. Bassler, and Charles Doolittle Walcott. Wieser used a combination of a microscope and drawing, camera lucida, to record fossils that were millions of years old, and was recognized for her ability to capture details of fossils by drawing rather than relying on photography.

=== Death and legacy ===
Wieser died on January 15, 1949, in Washington, D.C., at St. Elizabeths Hospital, a psychiatric hospital where she was a resident.

In 1904, the Cythere francisca or C. francisca fossil was named in her honor by the Maryland Geological Survey. In 1911, Ray S. Bassler named the Sceptropora francisca or S. francisca fossil in her honor.

== Publications ==
- Clark, William Bullock (1904). Reports Dealing with the Systematic Geology and Paleontology of Maryland. Vol. 2, Part 1. Maryland Geological Survey, Francisca Wieser (illustrations). Baltimore, MD: Johns Hopkins Press.
- Bassler, Ray S. (1906). A Study of the James Types of Ordovician and Silurian Bryozoa, No. 1442. Pamphlets on Biology: Kofoid collection. Vol. XXX. Francisca Wieser (illustrations). Washington, D.C.: Government Printing Office (G.P.O.).
- Bassler, Ray Smith (1911). Bulletin 77, The Early Paleozoic Bryozoa of the Baltic Provinces. Smithsonian Institution, United States National Museum, Francisca Wieser (illustrations). Washington, D.C.: Government Printing Office (G.P.O.). ISBN 978-0-598-37126-3.
- Canu, Ferdinand; Bassler, Ray Smith (1920). Bulletin 106, North American Early Tertiary Bryozoa. Vol. 1. Smithsonian Institution, United States National Museum, Francisca Wieser (illustrations). Washington, D.C.: Government Printing Office (G.P.O.).
- Springer, Frank (1921). Bulletin 115, The Fossil Crinoid Genus Dolatocrinus and its Allies. United States National Museum, Smithsonian Institution, William De Chastignier Ravenel (introduction), Kenneth M. Chapman, Herrick E. Wilson, Ray S. Bassler, Francesca Wieser. Government Printing Office (G.P.O.).
- Walcott, Charles Doolittle (1924). Nomenclature of Some Post Cambrian and Cambrian Cordilleran Formations. Smithsonian Miscellaneous Collection. Vol. 67. Frances Wieser (illustrations). Washington, D.C. and Baltimore, MD: Smithsonian Institution and The Lord Baltimore Press.
- Walcott, Charles Doolittle (1924). Cambrian Geology and Paleontology. Smithsonian Miscellaneous Collection. Vol. 67. Frances Wieser (illustrations). Washington, D.C. and Baltimore, MD: Smithsonian Institution and The Lord Baltimore Press.
