= New Deal and the arts in New Mexico =

Roosevelt's arts funding program

Justice Tempered with Mercy by Emil Bisttram c. 1936, located at Federal Building and United States Courthouse (Albuquerque, New Mexico)

The Wall Street crash of 1929 left many artists (as well as other workers) in the United States unemployed. Collectors who normally could afford to purchase such luxury items no longer had the means to do so. President Franklin D. Roosevelt's New Deal program created funding for art projects which would inspire confidence in American life and history. The program's objective was to hire artists to create works of art for display in public buildings throughout the country. From 1934 to 1943, there were various federally funded programs for artists in New Mexico – the Treasury Section of Painting and Sculpture, the Public Works of Art Project (PWAP), the Works Progress Administration (WPA)/Federal Art Project (WPA/FAP), and the Treasury Relief Art Project (TRAP).

== Public Works of Art Project ==
The PWAP was the first, short-lived, federally funded arts program to alleviate the economic job crisis. The program consisted of the selection of public buildings to receive various forms of art. It began in December 1933 and ended in June 1934.

George Biddle generated the idea of American artists painting murals in selected public buildings in New Mexico. By 1934, 100 artists had been assigned art projects by the Civil Works Administration (CWA) in the PWAP program throughout the state. Various public libraries, courthouses, post offices and state and county buildings received original works of art in the form of easel painting, murals or decorative objects.

There were sixteen regional districts set up; Region 13 included New Mexico and Arizona. Each regional district had local representation. Many of the artists and program organizers were well-known local figures. The regional committee which helped organize and select local administrators consisted of Senator Bronson Cutting, architect John Gaw Meem and social activist writer Mary Austin. Region 13 administrators were director Jesse Nusbaum (a New Mexico anthropologist), secretary Kenneth M. Chapman (also an anthropologist) and regional coordinator Gustave Baumann (a well-known artist in Santa Fe).

Baumann and other team members traveled throughout New Mexico, selecting towns and potential sites to be considered for artwork. He received a salary and transportation to travel New Mexico, asking local people and artists to recommend buildings for the artwork.

Federal funding for these art projects was not immediately available. The art and artists for selected towns and cities were determined over a period of time. The artists were able to pick their own themes, subject matter and style. Some of the mural locations were selected by the artists themselves. Each artist was evaluated and paid according to his or her skill and experience. "Class A" artists were upper-class artists – more established, considered highly skilled and experienced. They were paid $40 a week for 20 hours' work. "Class B" artists were less skilled and experienced, and were paid $27.50 a week for 20 hours of work. "Class C" artists were craftsman and laborers, receiving the lowest pay. When the PWAP project ended in June 1934 Region 13 had employed 3,600 artists and produced more than 16,000 works of art, created for public display.

== Works Progress Administration/Federal Art Project ==
The WPA project was referred to as the FAP, and was in effect from August 1935 to July 1943. The objective of this program was to put financially needy artists to work in jobs matching their talents. Unlike other federally funded arts programs, the artist had to be certified for relief by the Welfare Department. The FAP commissioned paintings, murals, sculptures and easel works. It also supported craft work such as woodwork, metal work, weaving and embroidery. The project also strove to develop educational art programs, community art centers and community galleries.

The WPA/FAP operated out of Washington, with advice from regional and state directors. Holger Chill (a prominent art collector and authority on American folk art) was the national director. Donald Baer was the regional director of District 5, which included New Mexico, Arizona, Colorado, Utah and Wyoming. He was responsible for coordinating artistic activities in all five states. Russell Vernon Hunter (a professional artist) was director for New Mexico. He was very dedicated and stayed on for the entire program, until it ended in 1943. His position consisted of assigning personnel, supervising all projects and locating sites to receive the artwork.

The artist selected his or her subject matter, and some worked out of their own studios. The Hispanic population benefited most from the FAP program, since they were the largest ethnic group in New Mexico and required considerable assistance during the Depression years. The FAP gave free rein to the New Mexico Hispanic artist's culture and heritage.

== Treasury Relief Art Project ==
TRAP was in effect from July 1935 to June 1939, operating in tandem with the WPA/FAP. The primary goal of TRAP was to help needy artists, with the quality of the art produced an important consideration. These commissions were awarded to artists with more experience and better skills. The government insisted on using local subject matter whenever possible. Olin Dows (a professional painter) agreed to be the unsalaried national director, Jesse Nusbaum was the regional advisor and artist Emil Bisttram was the local supervisor in New Mexico. When the project was completed, 356 artists created artworks for old (and new) Federal buildings.

== See also ==
- Public Works of Art Project
- Federal Art Project
- Civil Works Administration
- Section of Painting and Sculpture
- List of United States post office murals § New Mexico
