= Apie Begay =

American painter

- Occupation: painter
- Years active: early 20th century

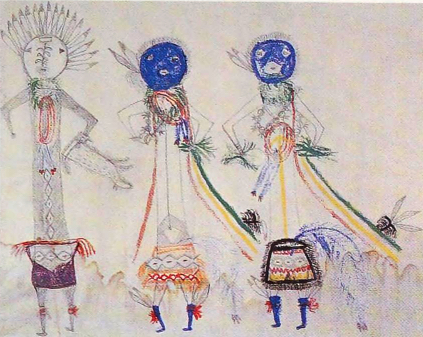
"Three Sand Painting Figures," wax pencils and pencil drawing, 1902

Apie Begay was a Navajo painter and artist in the early 20th century who resided and created art near the Pueblo Bonito trading post in the western part of present-day New Mexico. He is considered the first Navajo artist to create works with European-style materials such as crayons and colored pencils. Begay's work has been published widely and is in the permanent collections of institutions including the Museum of New Mexico and the Fred Jones Jr. Museum of Art.

== Life ==
Begay's birthdate is unknown. His name Begay Apie means "Son of Milk."

In 1902, anthropologist Kenneth M. Chapman visited the Navajo region and heard about a man "who does nothing ... for he is an artist." Chapman was intrigued and sought out this artist, eventually finding Begay in his hogan using red and black pigments to recreate spiritual Navajo sandpainting. Chapman gave him a box of crayons to expand his color palette, and Begay quickly incorporated this broader range into his work.

Chapman later wrote of this meeting, "One of the clerks showed us some drawings of Navajo dance groups, made by a Navajo artist, with pencil, on cardboard salvaged from paper boxes. I gave the artist, Apie Begay, some good paper, and lent him my box of ten colored pencils, the first he had ever seen. Apie made three drawings for me that have been described and exhibited several times as the earliest known examples of Navajo art produced with white man's materials."

Begay created several works on commission for Chapman. Some scholars consider this the beginning of "Anglo sponsorship" of indigenous art.

Begay's date of death is also unknown, though sources say he died "many years before 1936."

== Legacy ==
Begay was encouraged, as were nearly all Navajo artists of the time, to change his art style to meet more European sensibilities, but he resisted this shift and retained his more traditional imagery and styles instead. White critics often found fault with this; in 1973, for instance, Clara Lee Tanner wrote of Begay, "Apie Begay illustrates well the difficulties a primitive artist has in breaking away from established tools and materials and in attempting to use equipment and techniques which are partially or even totally strange to him." Three years later, Cherokee-passing white writer Jamake Highwater wrote that Tanner's assessment was "a rather condescending conclusion."

By 2009, scholar Tom Holm called Begay "the father of modern Navajo painting." Begay's paintings based on traditional culture but directed at a non-Native audience have been described as "the beginning of Native modernism".
