= Saint Elizabeths Hospital East and West Cemeteries =

Historic cemetery in Washington, D.C.

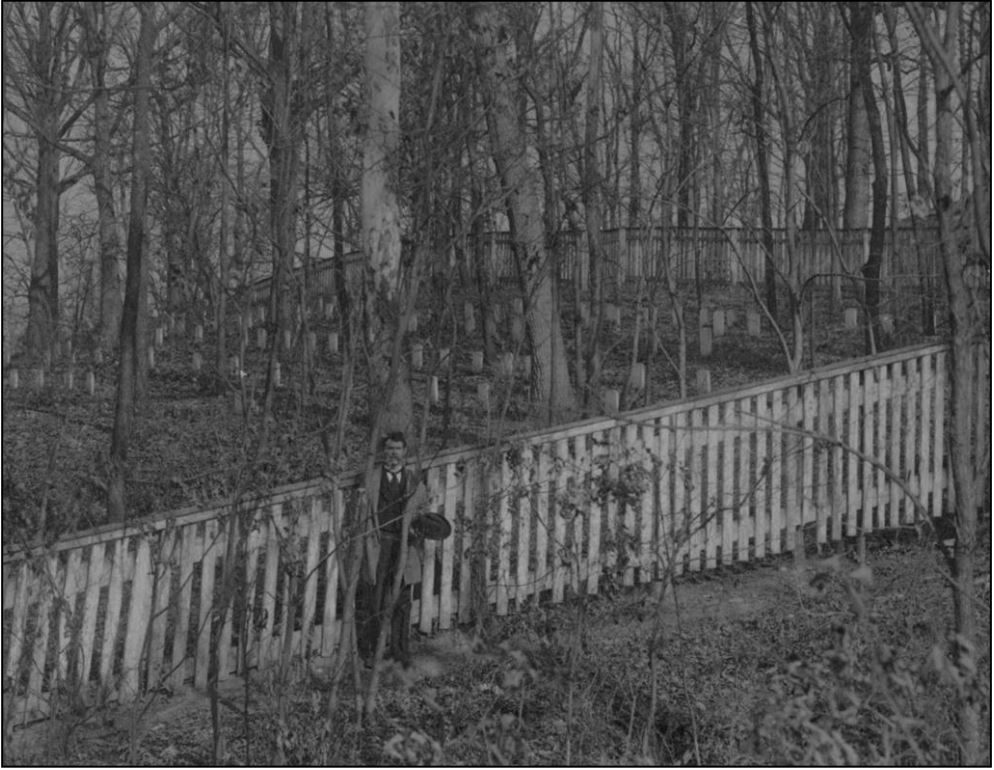
- Saint Elizabeth West Cemetery c. 1897
- Interactive map of Saint Elizabeths Hospital East and West Cemeteries

Details
- Established: 1856
- Location: Anacostia, Washington, D.C.
- Country: United States
- Coordinates: 38.854827°N 77.003513°W
- Type: Public
- Owned by: US Public Health Service
- Size: 10 acres (40,000 m^{2})
- Find a Grave: Saint Elizabeths Hospital East and West Cemeteries

St. Elizabeths Hospital East and West Cemeteries are two historic cemeteries located on the grounds of St. Elizabeths Hospital.

The West Cemetery has burials from the Civil War and hospital patients. Most of the veterans buried in the cemetery, on the West Campus, were patients of the hospital, not casualties of the war. A burial ledger of hospital patients between 1917 and 1983 was transcribed and published in 2008.

On the East Campus is the John Howard Cemetery. This cemetery has burials of veterans of multiple conflicts including the Civil War, Spanish–American War, World Wars I and II, a lone veteran of the War of 1812, and a Black Seminole Scout from the Seminole War.

Access to the cemeteries today is controlled by the General Services Administration with only authorized persons allowed.

== History ==
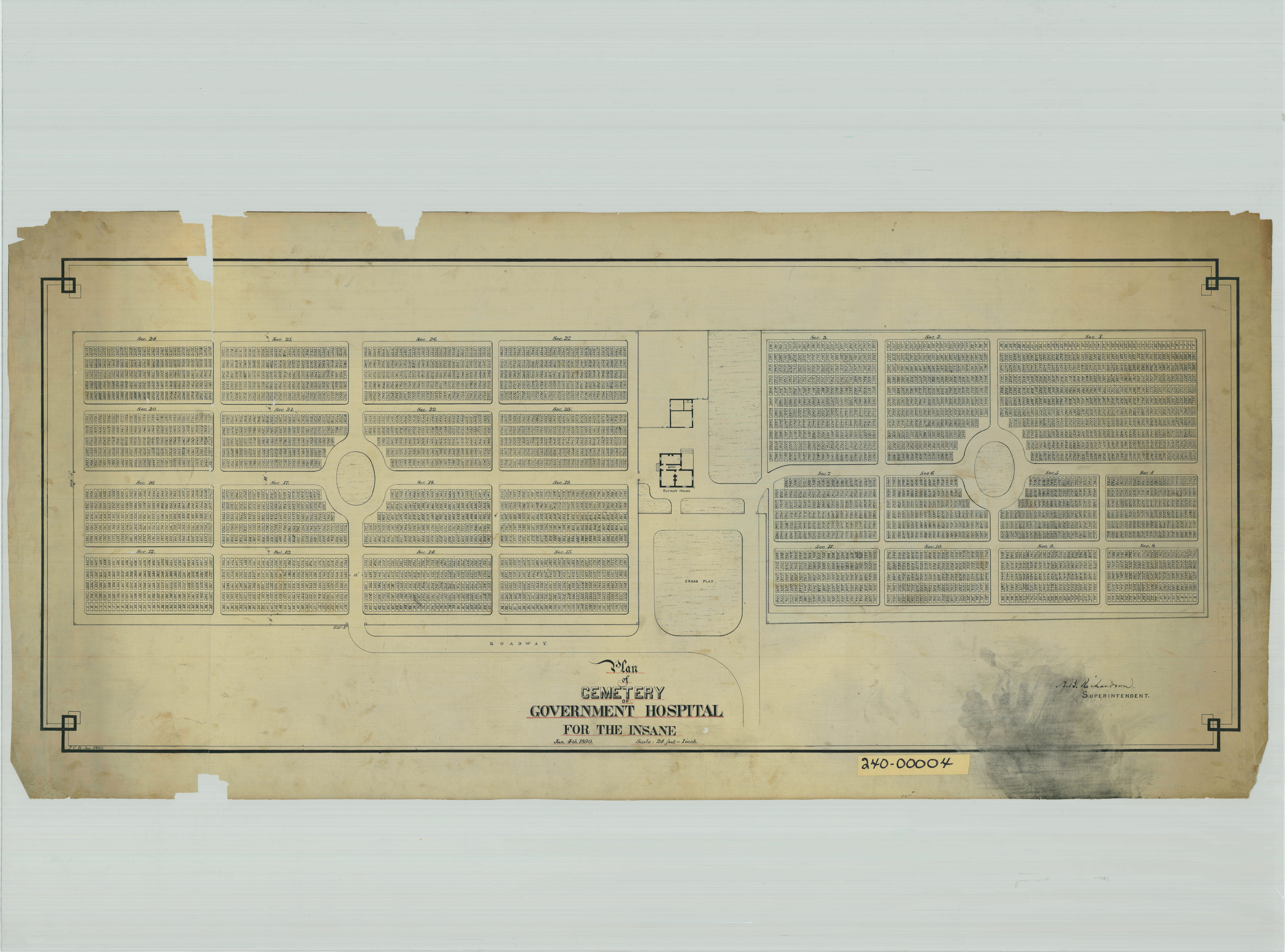
Plans of St. Elizabeths Hospital West Cemetery 1890

A plaque on a wall of the West cemetery states:

Founded during the Civil War for wounded soldiers that died on the St Elizabeths Campus during and after the Civil War. This small cemetery houses the remains of some 300 Civil War dead, both Confederate and Union, Black and White. When the foliage of the local forest subsides in the winter, the cemetery is visible from a considerable distance, since the white headstones are placed in the form of a cross.

Established in 1856, the West Cemetery spans just over 0.7 acres and contains approximately 600 graves.

By 1873 the West Cemetery was considered full and, as result, plans were made to establish the East Cemetery. The latter grew over the following 120 years into a nine-acre cemetery, with more than 5,000 total burials: over 2,050 military and over 3,000 civilian.

In 2016, a new headstone was added to recognize Medal of Honor recipient Joseph B. Noil, buried in 1882, whose previous headstone had misspelled his surname as Noel and had no acknowledgement of his award.
