= James Swann =

American spree killer

- Born: James Edward Swann, Jr. 1964 (age 61–62); Iselin, New Jersey, U.S.
- Occupation: Former security guard
- Parent(s): James Swann, Sr.
- Motive: Mental illness

Details
- Date: February 23 – April 19, 1993
- Country: United States
- Location: Washington, D.C.
- Killed: 4
- Injured: 5
- Weapon: Shotgun

James Edward Swann Jr. a.k.a. The Shotgun Stalker (born 1964), is an African-American serial killer whose random drive-by shotgun shootings in Washington, D.C. in 1993 earned him his nickname in the press. Swann was living in the Iselin section of Woodbridge Township, New Jersey before the attacks. He has been confined to St. Elizabeths Hospital since 1994 as a forensic patient since he was found not guilty by reason of insanity. His request for a furlough in 2011 was denied.

== Murders ==
Swann drove to Washington to carry out the attacks, which took place in the Mount Pleasant and Columbia Heights neighborhoods. Each of the attacks followed a standard format: Swann would slow his car down next to a pedestrian and fire a 20-gauge shotgun at the target before driving away. Swann killed four people and injured five in 14 attacks before he was apprehended by the Metropolitan Police on April 19, 1993.

== In custody ==
Swann was found not guilty by reason of insanity and confined to Saint Elizabeths Hospital. He claimed to have been driven to the killings by voices in his head, including that of the ghost of Malcolm X, who told him to kill people in Northwest Washington—the "civil rights side of town"—because they had been responsible for the civil rights leader's assassination in 1965.

In 2011, Swann applied for a 12-hour furlough from the psychiatric hospital where he has been committed in order to visit his father. Such a visit was to be under his father's supervision. Witnesses for Swann noted that he had earned an associate degree in Computer Science while incarcerated. A psychologist testifying on his behalf said that he had reviewed Swann's records, which showed that Swann "had not had a violent episode at the hospital since 2003, and his aggression with his psychosis was gone." This psychologist felt that Swann has a "low risk" of violence. But Swann was still suffering from hallucinations as recently as 2008. According to Assistant U.S. Attorney Colleen Kennedy, who opposed the furlough, Swann's father had given him a t-shirt with the phrase "Thrill to Kill" emblazoned on it, which Swann enjoyed wearing. The request for a furlough was denied.

== See also ==
- List of serial killers in the United States
