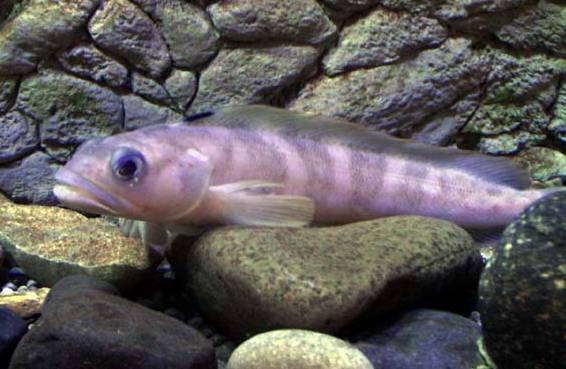

Scientific classification
- Kingdom: Animalia
- Phylum: Chordata
- Class: Actinopterygii
- Order: Perciformes
- Family: Bathymasteridae
- Genus: Bathymaster
- Species: B. signatus

Binomial name
- Bathymaster signatus Cope, 1873

= Bathymaster signatus =

Species of fish

Bathymaster signatus, the searcher, is species of marine ray-finned fish belonging to the family Bathymasteridae, the ronquils. This species is found in the northern Pacific Ocean.

== Taxonomy ==
Bathymaster signatus was first formally described in 1873 by the American paleontologist and biologist Edward Drinker Cope with its type locality given as Sitka, Alaska. Cope placed this new species in a new monotypic genus Bathymaster and so this species is the type species of that genus. The specific name signatus means "marked", presumed to be an allusion to the black spot crossing the tips of the membranes and first five rays of the dorsal fin.

== Description ==
Bathymaster signatus has an elongated, moderately compressed body, deepest at the start of the dorsal fin, with a large slightly pointed head. The mouth is terminal and diagonal with the outer teeth on the upper jaw being canine-like and the inner ones more conical, this is reversed on the lower jaw. There are teeth on the vomer and palatine. The oval shaped eyes are large. DThe dorsal fin has 47 soft rays and the anal fin has between 32 and 34 soft rays. The caudal fin is slender and softly rounded. The color is brown on the upper body having dark markings, paler on the lower body with yellow to orange streaks. Some geographical populations may show some yellow on the head and yellow mottling on fins. There is a conspicuous black blotch on the anterior part of dorsal fin over the first 3 to 5 rays. The pelvic fins are dusky and there are some dark markings on the other fins. The eyes are said to be blue. This species attains a maximum published total length of 38 cm (15 in).

== Distribution and habitat ==
Bathymaster signatus is found in the northern North Pacific Ocean where its range extends from East Siberian Sea to eastern Kamchatka and the Komandorski Islands, Russia to the state of Washington, United States including the Sea of Okhotsk. It is a demersal fish that is found on soft substrates offshore to depths of about 300 m (980 ft), but has been reported down to 825 m (2,707 ft).

== Biology ==
Bathymaster signatus has a spawning season which ends in June. They become sexually mature at lengths of 27 to 28 cm (11 to 11 in) and the mean fecundity of females is 90,351 eggs. The eggs have a diameter of 1.4 mm, and a weight of 1.14 mg. Their diet is made up largely of polychaetes as well as hermit crabs, shrimps, and gammarids, in order of decreasing importance.
