= Emma Lewis =

Native American potter (1931–2013)

Emma Lewis (1931–2013) was a Native American potter from the Acoma Pueblo. She was the daughter of the potter Lucy M. Lewis.

Her work is included in the collections of the Seattle Art Museum, the Peabody Museum of Archaeology and Ethnology and the Brooklyn Museum.
