= Ferdinand Canu =

French paleontologist and author

Ferdinand Canu (1863–1932) was a French paleontologist and author. In 1923 he was awarded Daniel Giraud Elliot Medal for his work North American Later Tertiary and Quaternary Bryozoa.

== Works ==
- 1917 – A synopsis of American Early Tertiary Cheilostome Bryozoa
- 1918 – Bryozoa of the Canal Zone and Related Areas
- 1919 – Contributions to the Geology and Paleontology of the West Indies
- Canu, Ferdinand; Bassler, Ray Smith (1920). Bulletin 106, North American Early Tertiary Bryozoa. Vol. 1. Smithsonian Institution, United States National Museum, Francisca Wieser (illustrations). Washington, D.C.: Government Printing Office (G.P.O.).
- 1921 – Bryozoa of the Philippine Region
- 1923 – North American Later Tertiary and Quaternary Bryozoa
- 1931 – Bryozoaires oligocènes de la Belgique conservés au Musée royal d'histoire naturelle de Belgique
- 1933 – The Bryozoan Fauna of the Vincentown Limesand
