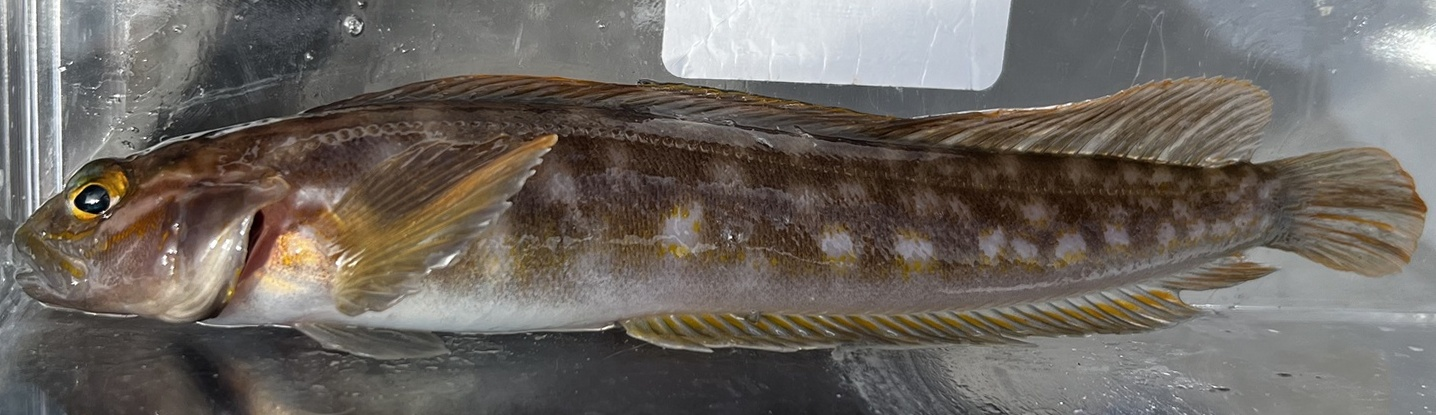

Scientific classification
- Kingdom: Animalia
- Phylum: Chordata
- Class: Actinopterygii
- Order: Perciformes
- Family: Bathymasteridae
- Genus: Ronquilus; D. S. Jordan & Starks, 1895
- Species: R. jordani

Binomial name
- Ronquilus jordani (C. H. Gilbert, 1889)

Synonyms
- Bathymaster jordani Gilbert, 1889

= Northern ronquil =

Species of fish

The northern ronquil (Ronquilus jordani) is species of marine ray-finned fish belonging to the family Bathymasteridae, the ronquils. This species is found in the eastern Pacific Ocean. This species is the only known member of its genus.

== Taxonomy ==
The stripedfin ronquil was first formally described as Bathymaster jordani in 1889 by the American ichthyologist Charles Henry Gilbert with the type locality given as Puget Sound in Washington. When David Starr Jordan and Edwin Chapin Starks proposed the monotypic genus Ronquilus they designated this species as its type species. The genus is classified in the family Bathymasteridae which is in the Scorpaeniform suborder Zoarcoidei.

== Etymology ==
The genus name is an anglicization from the Spanish word ronco, ronquillo being a diminutive, and which means "one who grunts", although Jordan and Starks did not mention croaking. The specific name jordani honors David Starr Jordan who, with Gilbert, first identified this species in Puget Sound.

== Description ==
The northern ronquil is a small, cylindrical ichthyoplankton with brown to gray head, and two yellow bands on cheek. The body is gray with dark spots near pale or pale-yellow fins. This species can be distinguished from other members of the Bathymaster family by its cheek scales and the absence of some features in the cephalic lateralis system. This species has a maximum published total length of 20 cm (7.9 in).

== Distribution and habitat ==
The northern ronquil is found in the northern Pacific Ocean from the eastern Aleutian Islands at Unimak Pass south to southern California, although it seems to be rare off California. Reports from elsewhere in the northern Pacific require to be verified. The adults are primarily benthic (bottom-dwelling) along rocky continental shelf and upper slope waters of the north-eastern Pacific Ocean. However, larvae and juveniles are considered neustonic, and occupy waters closer to the surface. This is thought to be beneficial due to increased growth in the warmer surface water and reduced predation at shallower depth. The life cycle and habitat preference of the Northern ronquil is subject to ongoing research.
