= Ray S. Bassler =

American geologist and paleontologist

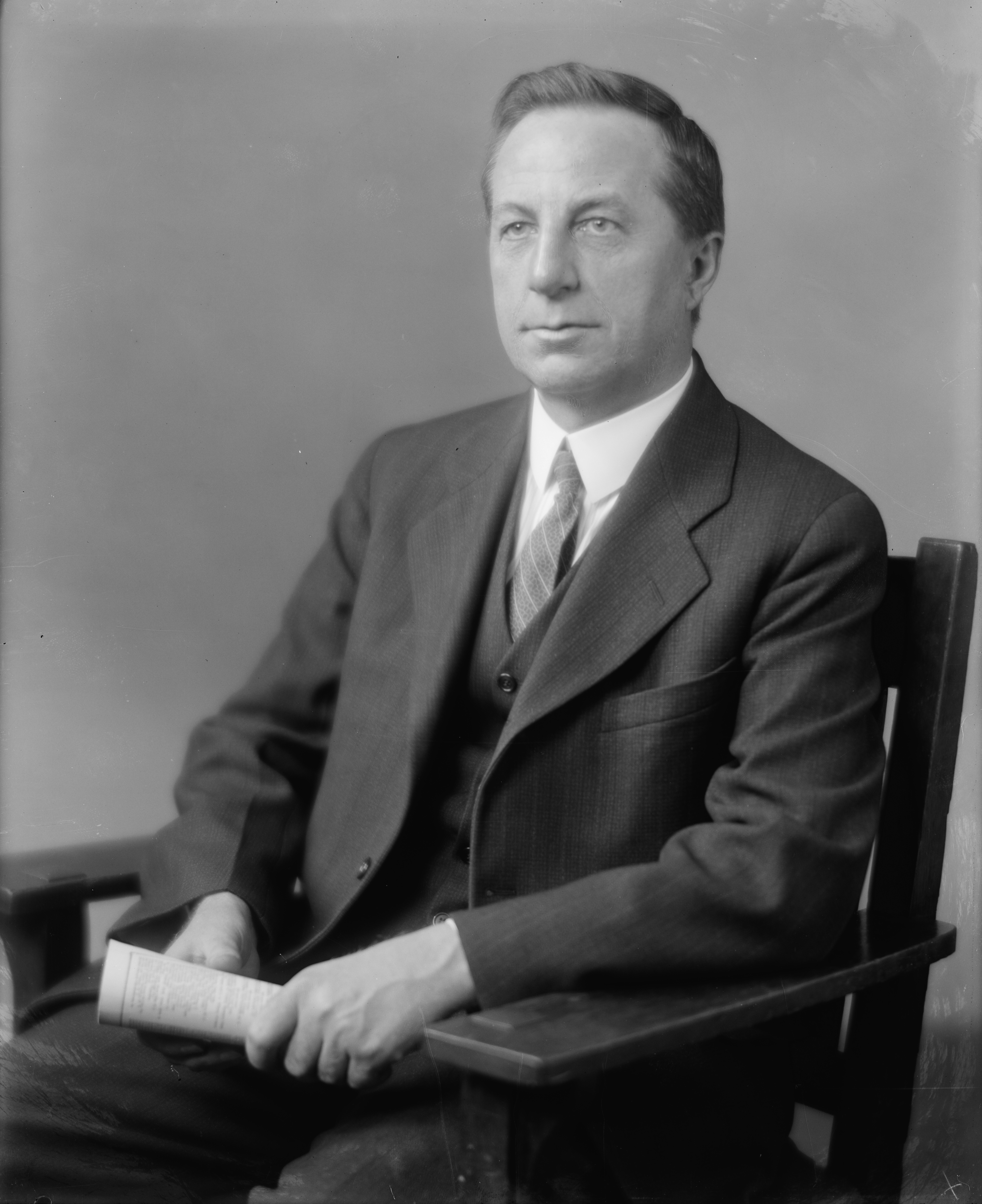
- Born: July 22, 1878
- Died: October 3, 1961 (aged 83)
- Scientific career
- Fields: Geology; Paleontology

Ray Smith Bassler (July 22, 1878 – October 3, 1961) was an American geologist and paleontologist.

== Biography ==
Bassler was born in 1878, in Philadelphia. When he was in high school he used to sell fossils for Edward Oscar Ulrich. He got his bachelor's degree in 1902 from the University of Cincinnati, and received master's degree in 1903 and Ph.D. in 1905 from George Washington University. Starting from 1904 to 1948 he was an assistant professor there. From 1905 to 1931 he was working with Ferdinand Canu of France on Tertiary Polyzoa of the Atlantic and Gulf coasts. Starting from 1910 to 1922 he was working as a curator for the Division of Paleontology and for the Division of Stratigraphic Paleontology from 1923 to 1928 at the United States National Museum. By 1929 he was appointed as a head curator of the Department of Geology, a job that he kept till his promotion to associate in Paleontology in 1948. He died in 1961.

He worked extensively on bryozoans (then called also polyzoans). In particular, he was the author of the bryozoan volume (Part G) of the Treatise on Invertebrate Paleontology, the first volume of this multi-volume compendium to be published (1953).

In 1925, he described the conodont families Prioniodinidae and Polygnathidae. In 1926, with E. O. Ulrich, he described the conodont genus Ancyrodella.

== Tributes ==
The conodont species name Neognathodus bassleri is a tribute to RS Bassler.

== Publications ==
- Bassler, Ray S. (1906). A Study of the James Types of Ordovician and Silurian Bryozoa, No. 1442. Pamphlets on Biology: Kofoid collection. Vol. XXX. Francisca Wieser (illustrations). Washington, D.C.: Government Printing Office (G.P.O.).
- Bassler, Ray Smith (1911). Bulletin 77, The Early Paleozoic Bryozoa of the Baltic Provinces. Smithsonian Institution, United States National Museum, Francisca Wieser (illustrations). Washington, D.C.: Government Printing Office (G.P.O.). ISBN 978-0-598-37126-3.
- Canu, Ferdinand; Bassler, Ray Smith (1920). Bulletin 106, North American Early Tertiary Bryozoa. Vol. 1. Smithsonian Institution, United States National Museum, Francisca Wieser (illustrations). Washington, D.C.: Government Printing Office (G.P.O.).
