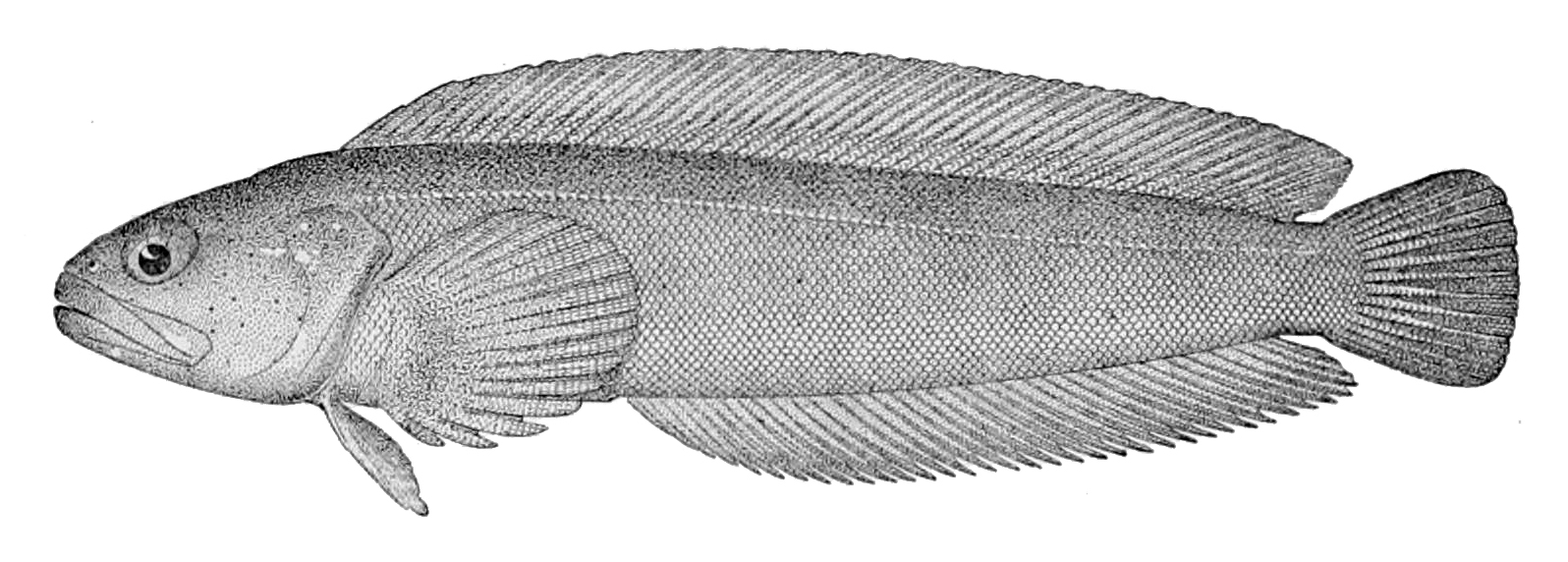
- Alaskan Ronquil (B. caeruleofasciatus)
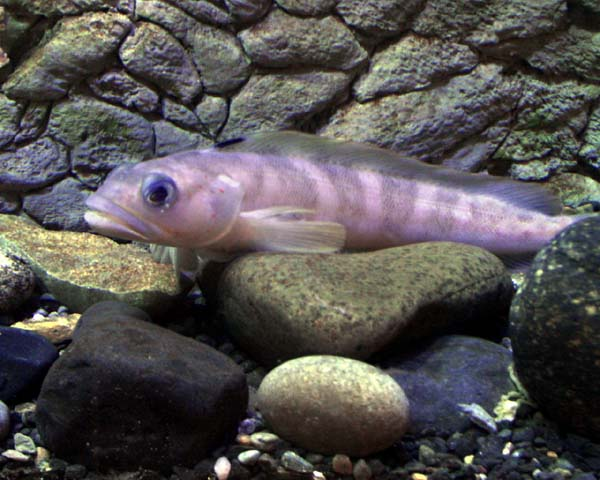
- Searcher (B. signatus)

Scientific classification
- Kingdom: Animalia
- Phylum: Chordata
- Class: Actinopterygii
- Order: Perciformes
- Family: Bathymasteridae
- Genus: Bathymaster; Cope, 1873

Type species
- Bathymaster signatus Cope, 1873

= Bathymaster =

Genus of fishes

Bathymaster is a genus of marine ray-finned fishes belonging to the family Bathymasteridae, the ronquils. These fishes are found in the northern Pacific Ocean.

== Taxonomy ==
Bathymaster was first proposed as a monotypic genus in 1873 by the American paleontologist and biologist Edward Drinker Cope when he described its type species Bathymaster signatus from Sitka, Alaska. The genus is classified in the family Bathymasteridae which is in the Scorpaeniform suborder Zoarcoidei. The genus name, Bathymaster, can be translated from the Greek to mean "deep searcher".

== Species ==
There are currently four recognized species in this genus:

- Bathymaster caeruleofasciatus C. H. Gilbert & Burke, 1912 (Alaskan ronquil)
- Bathymaster derjugini Lindberg, 1930 (Blackspot ronquil)
- Bathymaster leurolepis McPhail, 1965 (Smallmouth ronquil)
- Bathymaster signatus Cope, 1873 (Searcher)

== Characteristics ==
Bathymaster ronquils are distinguished from other genera of ronquils by having naked, i.e. scaleless, cheeks and opercula. there are 5 or 6 pores on the mandibles and the pores on the preoperculum are grouped in an 8:1:1 pattern. There are between 83 and 102 pored scales in the lateral line and these are not greater in size than the nearby scales. The dorsal fin is not continuous, and the first dorsal fin has 3 pliable spines. The largest species is B. signatus with a maximum published total length of 38 cm (15 in) while the smallest is B. derjugini which has a maximum published total length of 18 cm (7.1 in).

== Distribution and habitat ==
Bathymaster ronquils are found in the northern North Pacific from Washington north and west to Hokkaido. The searcher has been found as deep as 300 m (980 ft) but these fishes are typically found in shallow coastal waters at depths no greater than 200 m (660 ft). They are cold water benthic fishes.
