= Turbonilla rathbuni =

Scientific classification
- Kingdom: Animalia
- Phylum: Mollusca
- Class: Gastropoda
- Family: Pyramidellidae
- Genus: Turbonilla
- Species: T. rathbuni

Binomial name
- Turbonilla rathbuni Verrill & Smith, 1880

Species of gastropod

Turbonilla rathbuni is a species of sea snail, a marine gastropod mollusk in the family Pyramidellidae, the pyrams and their allies.

== Distribution ==
This species occurs in the following locations:

- North West Atlantic

== Notes ==
Additional information regarding this species:

- Distribution: Range: 41.5°N to 35°N; 75°W to 69.78°W. Distribution: USA: Massachusetts, Rhode Island, North Carolina
