= Lucy M. Lewis =

Native American potter

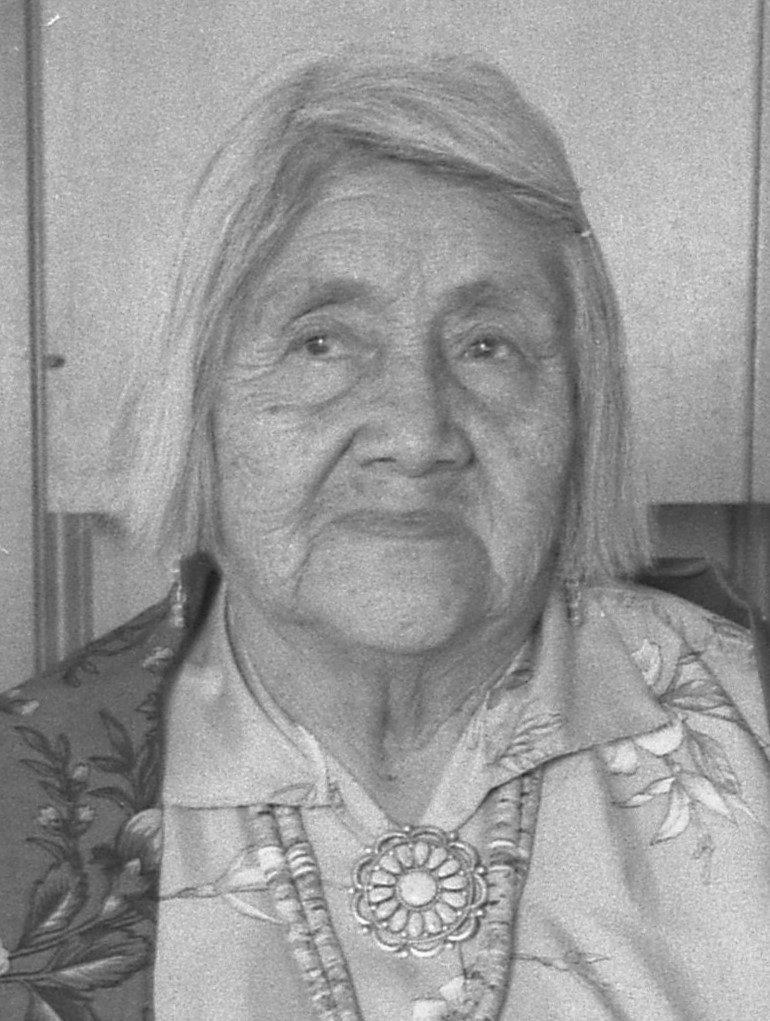
- Lewis in 1984
- Born: Lucy Martin c. 1890; Acoma Pueblo, New Mexico Territory
- Died: March 12, 1992; Acoma Pueblo, New Mexico, U.S.
- Style: Pottery
- Spouse: Toribio "Haskaya" Luis
- Children: Dolores Lewis Garcia

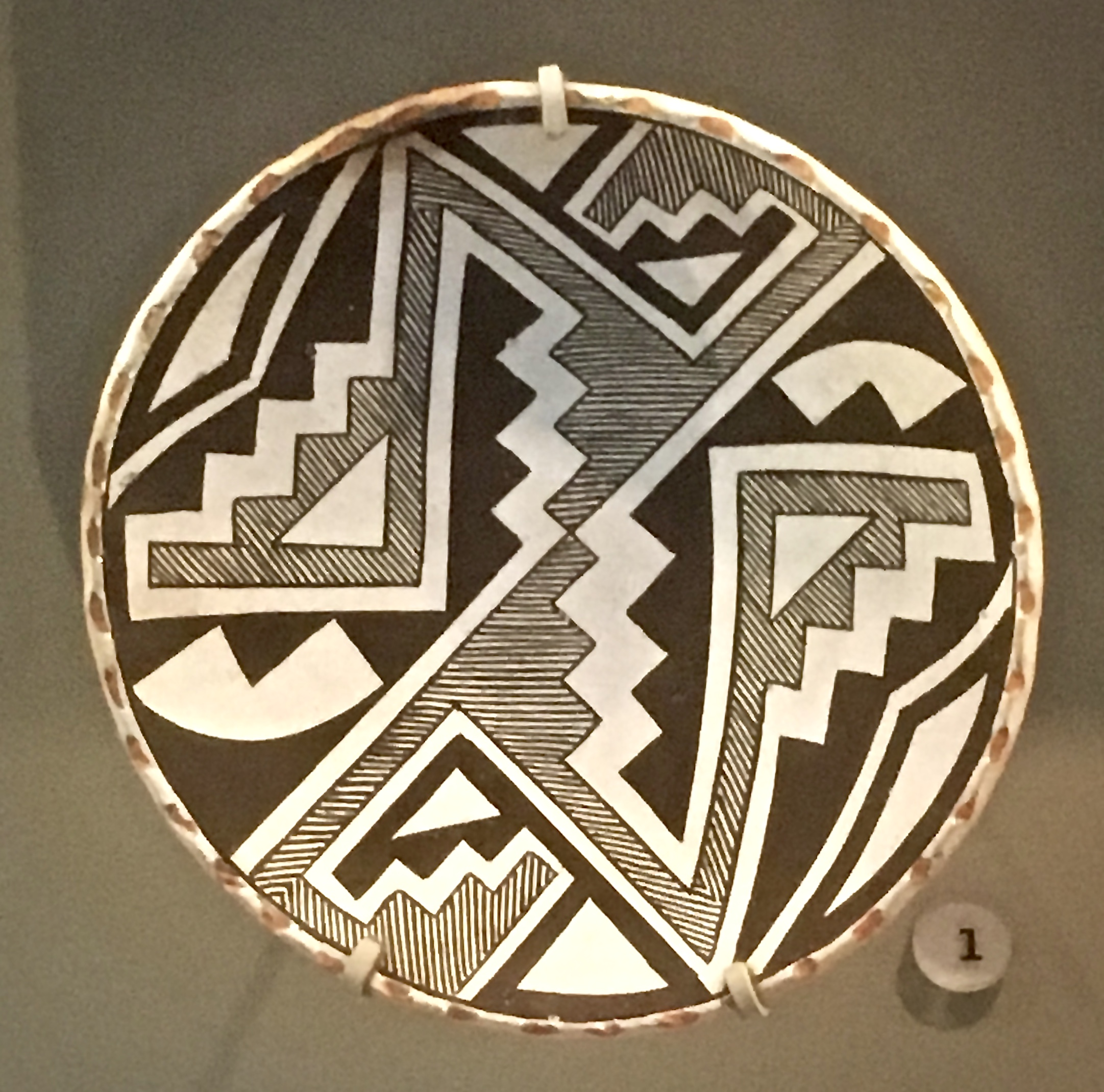
Small decorative plate with a classic Chaco--style design, by Lucy M. Lewis. On display at the Museum of Northern Arizona, Flagstaff

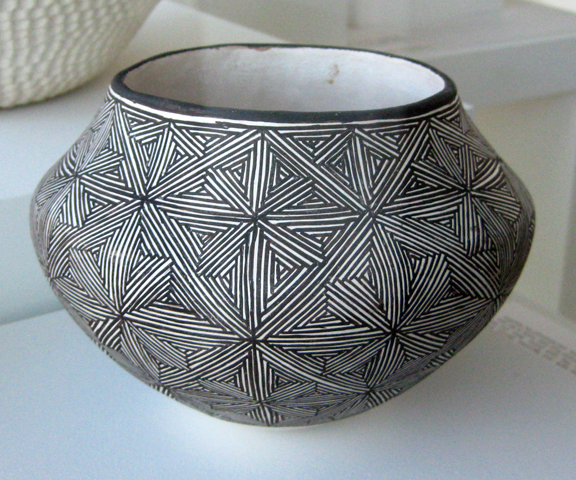
Fineline black-on-white olla by Lucy M. Lewis, ca. 1960–1970s, collection of the Fred Jones Jr. Museum of Art

Lucy Martin Lewis (1890/8–March 12, 1992) was a Native American potter from Acoma Pueblo, New Mexico. She is known for her black-on-white decorative ceramics made using traditional techniques.

== Biography ==
Lucy Martin Lewis was born in Sky City, a mesa in Acoma Pueblo, New Mexico, to Lola Santiago and Martin Ortiz. Though she celebrated her birthday on November 2, her birth year, while unknown, was probably in the 1890s.

There were no schools on the mesa, so Lewis received no formal education or art classes. She began making pottery at age eight, after studying with her great-aunt, Helice Vallo, and other Acoma Pueblo women. Both of her parents occasionally worked in the nearby town, Grants. Her early pottery was made for tourists. The ash-bowls were easily made and sold for five or ten cents.

In the late 1910s, Lewis married Toribio 'Haskaya' Luis. The family name was changed to Lewis when the oldest son, Ivan, went into the marines during World War II. She had nine children. Lewis handled household chores and helped her husband with the farming, yet still found time for her pottery; seven of her nine children went on to become potters themselves.

As an adult artist, Lewis was never in contact with archaeologists, museum curators, collectors, or many tourists due to Acoma Pueblo's remote location; she also did not travel to powwows or fairs, though she did occasionally sell her pottery in Grants, the closest nearby town at 20 miles away.

== Work ==
Lewis' daughter, Dolores Lewis Garcia, once noted:

"My mother, Lucy M. Lewis, began making pottery at about age seven and attracted public attention for her work in the 1950s...Our family would buy books to look up the old pottery designs and Dr. Kenneth M. Chapman from the Museum of New Mexico suggested to us to use the Mimbres designs and they have become very popular for us today. I was the first to use the Mimbres designs, then my sisters Emma and Mary began to use them. We have helped with publicity for other Acoma potters to bring more attention to the pottery of the Pueblo."

Lewis' designs were inspired by Ancestral Puebloans (Anasazi), including the Mimbres designs of the Mogollon as well as the Chacoan culture. Her work first began to be recognized outside of the Acoma Pueblo in 1950, when she won the a blue ribbon at the annual Gallup Intertribal Ceremonial. After the Gallup prize, Lewis began to sign her work, an act which created controversy within the Pueblo community. Four pieces of her pottery were featured on an episode of Antiques Roadshow and were appraised for between $10,000 to $18,000 for the set.

Before an artist can get started conceptualizing the design for a pot, the pot itself must be made. And before the pot can be made, the clay must be mined. Traditionally, clay has been mined from sites known only to each Pueblo tribe; the clay is considered sacred because it comes from the earth. After being mined, the dry raw material is sifted, pulverized, and tempered with potsherds that have been ground into powder to make the clay strong. Acoma clay, traditionally, is gray in color; its strength enables it to form thin walls of pottery.

Lewis's pottery is made from that same traditional Acoma gray clay body, and formed by hand using traditional coiling methods. To an untrained eye, pots formed using the coil method do not look much different from pots thrown on a wheel--but the difference is in the pace of creation; it can take many weeks to build a pot this way. Coiled pots taking substantially longer to build and require skill to keep the clay the perfect balance between wet and dry as it's being built. After the pot is shaped and dried, the form is further defined by hand-scraping the clay, and then sanded smooth with a stone. Then, a white slip is applied, in a few iterations, and polished. Without the slip, the mineral paints would run off the pot. Next, the design is applied using mineral paints and a brush made from yucca. Yucca holds more paint and makes finer lines than regular brushes bought at a store. Finally, on a day when the weather is right for firing, a small number of finished pieces are carefully pit-fired. Results are rarely 100%. Some pieces will end up cracked, the background on others will be gray rather than white (these will need to be re-fired), but a few will be successfully fired. After going through this process, one learns why these pieces should be well taken care of and carefully preserved.

Lewis' pottery featured innovative designs, and she has been compared to other innovators such as Pablo Picasso and Jackson Pollock. Lewis was known for the animals, and line designs she drew on her pottery. Her work is influenced by the color of the sky, along with her Native American culture. Lewis was mostly self-taught and her art was natural and innate. Lewis specialized in small pots that were usually six to twelve inches in height. In 1992, the price range for her pottery was listed as between one hundred and several thousand dollars.

Lewis' tribe, Acoma Pueblo, considered the clay she used for her pottery to be sacred. The creation of a single pot could take as long as two to three weeks. In addition, Native American pottery making is passed down the matriarchal line—mothers, grandmothers, and aunts teach the next generation.

In 1977, Lewis was invited to the White House and in 1983 she received New Mexico's Governor's Award for outstanding personal contribution to the art of the state. Her final art show was the 1991 SWAIA Indian Market in Santa Fe, New Mexico. After a long illness, Lucy M. Lewis died on March 12, 1992, in an Acoma Pueblo hospital.

== Awards ==
Lewis received awards for her work from the state of New Mexico, the College Arts Association, the American Crafts Council and the Honolulu Academy of Fine Arts.

== Notable collections ==
Her work is in the collections of the Smithsonian Institution and the National Museum of the American Indian, Cooper Hewitt, the Fred Jones Jr. Museum of Art, Lowell D. Holmes Museum of Anthropology, National Museum of Women in the Arts, the University of Michigan Museum of Art, the Haffenreffer Museum of Anthropology at Brown University, and the Spurlock Museum at the University of Illinois at Urbana-Champaign.

== Biographies ==
- Lucy M. Lewis: American Indian Potter by Susan Harnly Peterson and Fred Kabotie
- A Tribute to Lucy M. Lewis: Acoma Potter by John E. Collins and Dr. Frederick J. Dockstader
- Daughters of the Anasazi. John Anthony, Director. Albuquerque, NM.

== See also ==
- List of Native American artists
- Native American art
