= St. Elizabeths Hospital =

Psychiatric hospital in Washington, D.C.

- District of Columbia

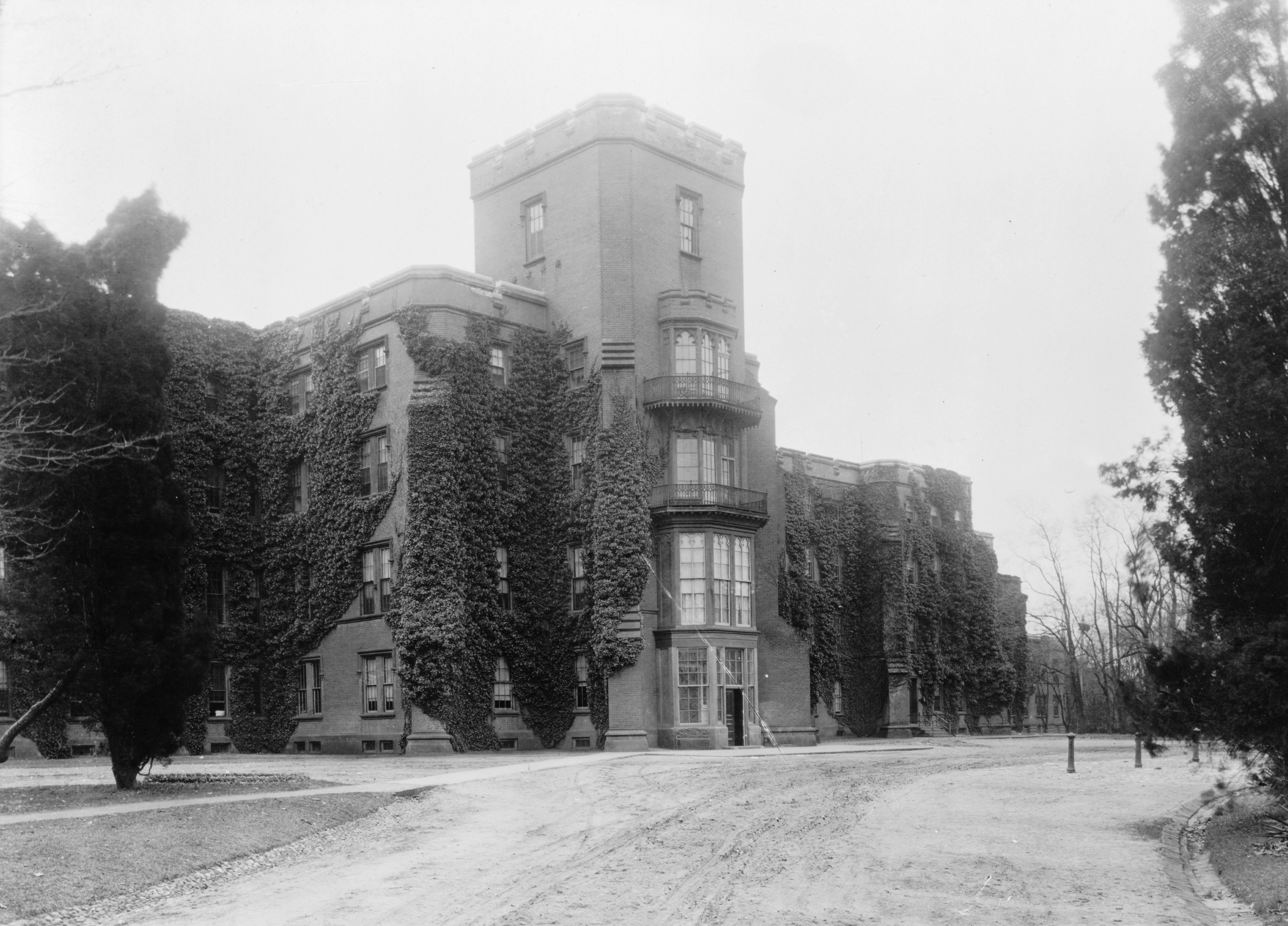
- The hospital's historic Center Building, seen here in the early 20th century, now serves as the headquarters of the Department of Homeland Security.

Geography
- Location: 1100 Alabama Avenue SE, Washington, D.C., U.S.

Organisation
- Type: Specialist

Services
- Specialty: Psychiatric

History
- Constructed: August 1852
- Opened: October 1855

Links
- Website: dbh.dc.gov/page/saint-elizabeths-hospital
- Lists: Hospitals in U.S.
- St. Elizabeths Hospital
- U.S. National Register of Historic Places
- U.S. National Historic Landmark District
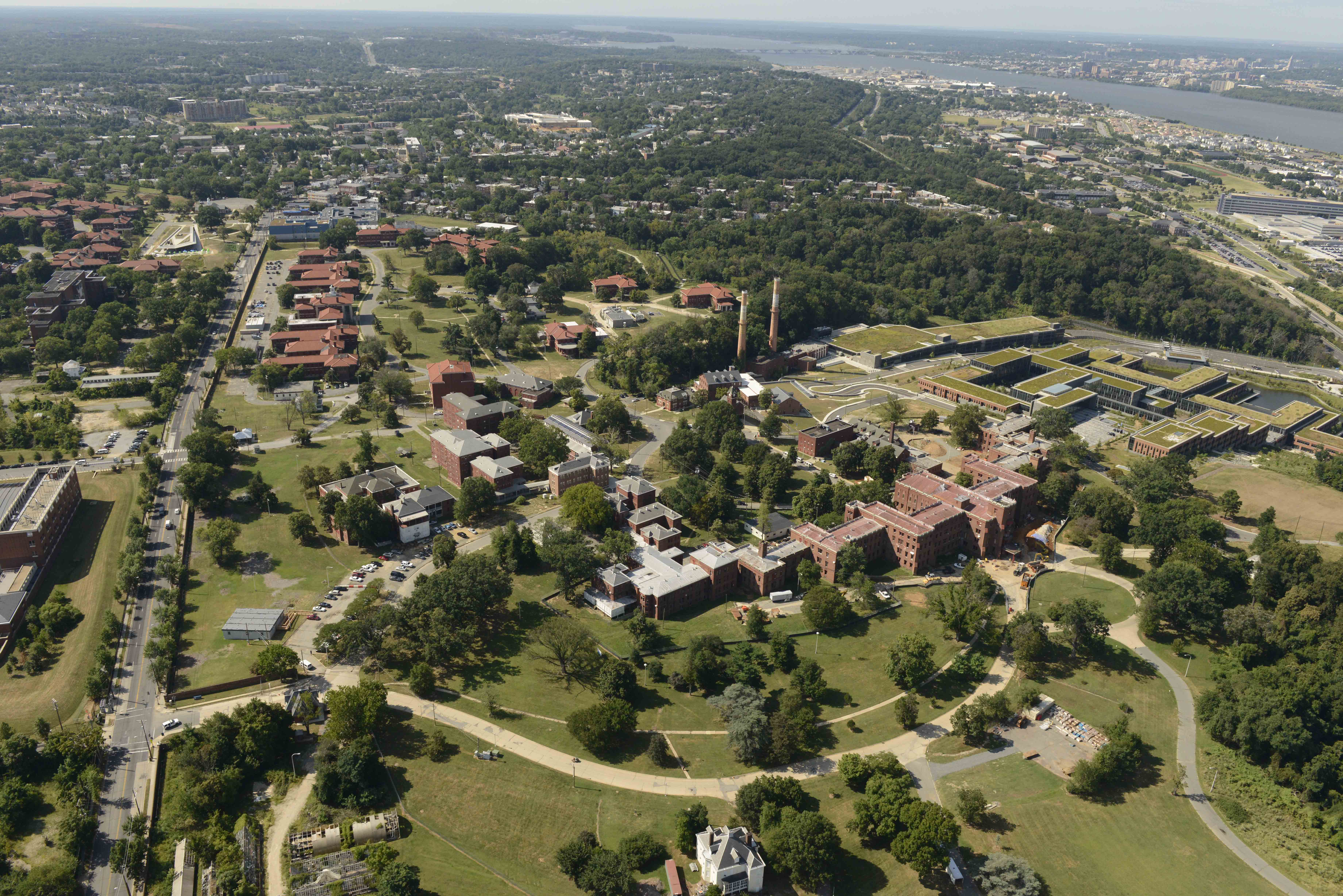
- Aerial view of the West Campus in 2015

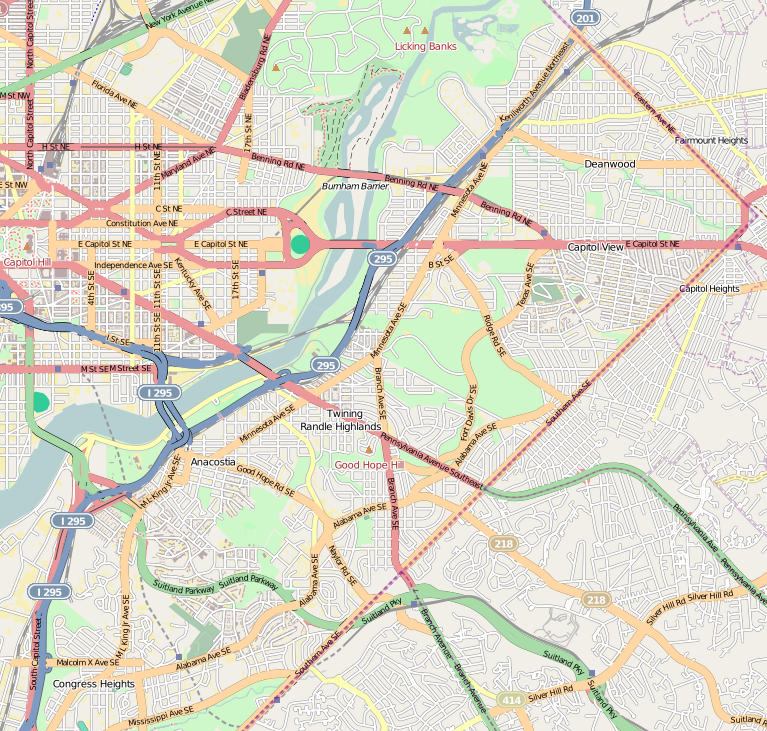
- Location within Washington, D.C. Location within the District of Columbia Location within the United States
- Location: 2700 and 2701 Martin Luther King Jr. Ave. SE, 1100 Alabama Avenue SE; Washington, D.C.
- Coordinates: 38°51′03″N 76°59′40″W
- Area: 346 acres (140 ha)
- Built: 1852
- Architect: Thomas U. Walter; Shepley, Rutan and Coolidge
- Architectural style: Italianate Revival, Italian Gothic Revival
- NRHP reference No.: 79003101

Significant dates
- Added to NRHP: April 26, 1979
- Designated NHLD: December 14, 1990

St. Elizabeths Hospital is a psychiatric hospital in Southeast Washington, D.C., operated by the District of Columbia Department of Mental Health. The hospital opened in 1855 under the name Government Hospital for the Insane, the first federally operated psychiatric hospital in the United States.

Housing over 8,000 patients at its peak in the 1950s, the hospital had a fully functioning medical-surgical unit, a school of nursing, accredited internships and psychiatric residencies. Its campus was designated a National Historic Landmark in 1990.

Since 2010, the hospital's functions have been limited to the portion of the East Campus operated by the District of Columbia Department of Mental Health. The remainder of the East Campus is slated for redevelopment by the District of Columbia. The West Campus was transferred to the United States Department of Homeland Security for its headquarters and its component agencies. The Douglas A. Munro Coast Guard Headquarters Building is located at the bottom of the West Campus. Much of the West Campus remains abandoned.

The campus grounds contain the Saint Elizabeths Hospital East and West Cemeteries. Burials were performed on the West Campus beginning in 1856. Approximately 450 graves of Civil War veterans and an unknown number of civilians are buried on the West Campus. In 1873, the three-quarter-acre West Campus burying ground was deemed full, and a new cemetery was opened on the East Campus. Approximately 2,050 military and 3,000 civilian interments occurred on the nine-acre cemetery on the East Campus over the next 120 years.

The hospital was under the control of the U.S. Department of Health and Human Services until 1987. At that time, ownership of its East Campus was transferred by the federal government to the District of Columbia.

== Early history ==
=== Founding ===
St. Elizabeths Hospital was founded as the Government Hospital for the Insane in August 1852 when the United States Congress appropriated $100,000 for the construction of a hospital in Washington, D.C., to provide care for indigent residents of the District of Columbia and members of the U.S. Army and Navy with brain illnesses.

In the 1830s, local residents, including Dr. Thomas Miller, a medical doctor and president of the Washington, D.C., Board of Health, had begun petitioning Congress for a facility to care for people with brain diseases in the City of Washington. Dorothea Dix (1802–1887) served as a pioneering advocate for people living with mental illnesses and she helped convince legislators of the need for the hospital. In 1852 she wrote the legislation that established the hospital.

Dix, who was on friendly terms with U.S. President Millard Fillmore, was asked to assist the Interior Secretary in getting the hospital started. Her recommendation resulted in the appointment of Dr. Charles H. Nichols as the hospital's first superintendent. After his appointment in the fall of 1852, Nichols and Dix began formulating a plan for the hospital's design and operation. They set out to find an appropriate location, based upon guidelines created by Thomas Story Kirkbride. His 1854 manual recommended specifics such as site, ventilation, number of patients, and the need for a rural location proximate to a city. He also recommended that the location have good soil for farming and gardens for the patients. Large facilities were self-supporting and some of the work was considered good for patients to engage in.

Dr. Nichols oversaw the design and building of St. Elizabeths, which began in 1853. The hospital was constructed in three phases. The west wing was built first, followed by the east wing and finally the center portion of the building, which housed the administrative operations as well as the superintendent's residential quarters. All three sections of the hospital were operated under one roof, in keeping with Kirkbride's design. Two other buildings, the West Lodge (1856–98) for men and the East Lodge for women, were built to house and care for African-American patients, as the city was effectively racially segregated.

=== Peak operation ===
Soon after the hospital opened to patients in January 1855, it became known officially as the Government Hospital for the Insane. During the Civil War, the West Lodge, originally built for male African-American patients, was used as a general hospital by the U.S. Navy. The unfinished east wing of the main building was used by the U.S. Army as a general hospital for sick and wounded soldiers. The Army hospital officially took the name of St. Elizabeth's Army Medical Hospital to differentiate it from the psychiatric hospital in the west wing of the same building. The name St. Elizabeth's was derived from the colonial-era name for the tract of land on which the hospital was built.

During the Civil War, General Hooker, concerned for the social well being of his troops had prostitution from the District to visit troops during daylight hours. These women were referred to Hookers girls, which explains the reference to prostitutes as Hookers.

After the Civil War and the closing of the Army's hospital, the St. Elizabeth's name was used unofficially and intermittently until 1916. Congress passed legislation changing the name from the Government Hospital for the Insane to St. Elizabeths Hospital, omitting the possessive apostrophe. It also transferred the hospital's administration to the United States Department of the Interior.

In the late 19th century, the hospital temporarily housed animals that were brought back from expeditions for the Smithsonian Institution. There were no other federal facilities for such purpose, as the National Zoo had not been built.

By 1940, St. Elizabeths Hospital was transferred to the Federal Security Agency, later the Department of Health, Education, and Welfare, as a U.S. Public Health Service Hospital. At its peak, the St. Elizabeths campus housed 8,000 patients annually and employed 4,000 people.

=== Decline ===
Beginning in the 1950s, large institutions such as St. Elizabeths were being criticized for hindering the treatment of patients and for outright abuses of some patients. The 1963 Community Mental Health Act led to deinstitutionalization. The act provided for local outpatient facilities and drug therapy as a more effective means of allowing patients to live near-normal lives. The first community-based center for mental health was established at St. Elizabeths in 1969.

The patient population of St. Elizabeths steadily declined as alternatives were sought for treatment. In 1967, the hospital was transferred to the National Institute of Mental Health.

== Recent history ==
External videos
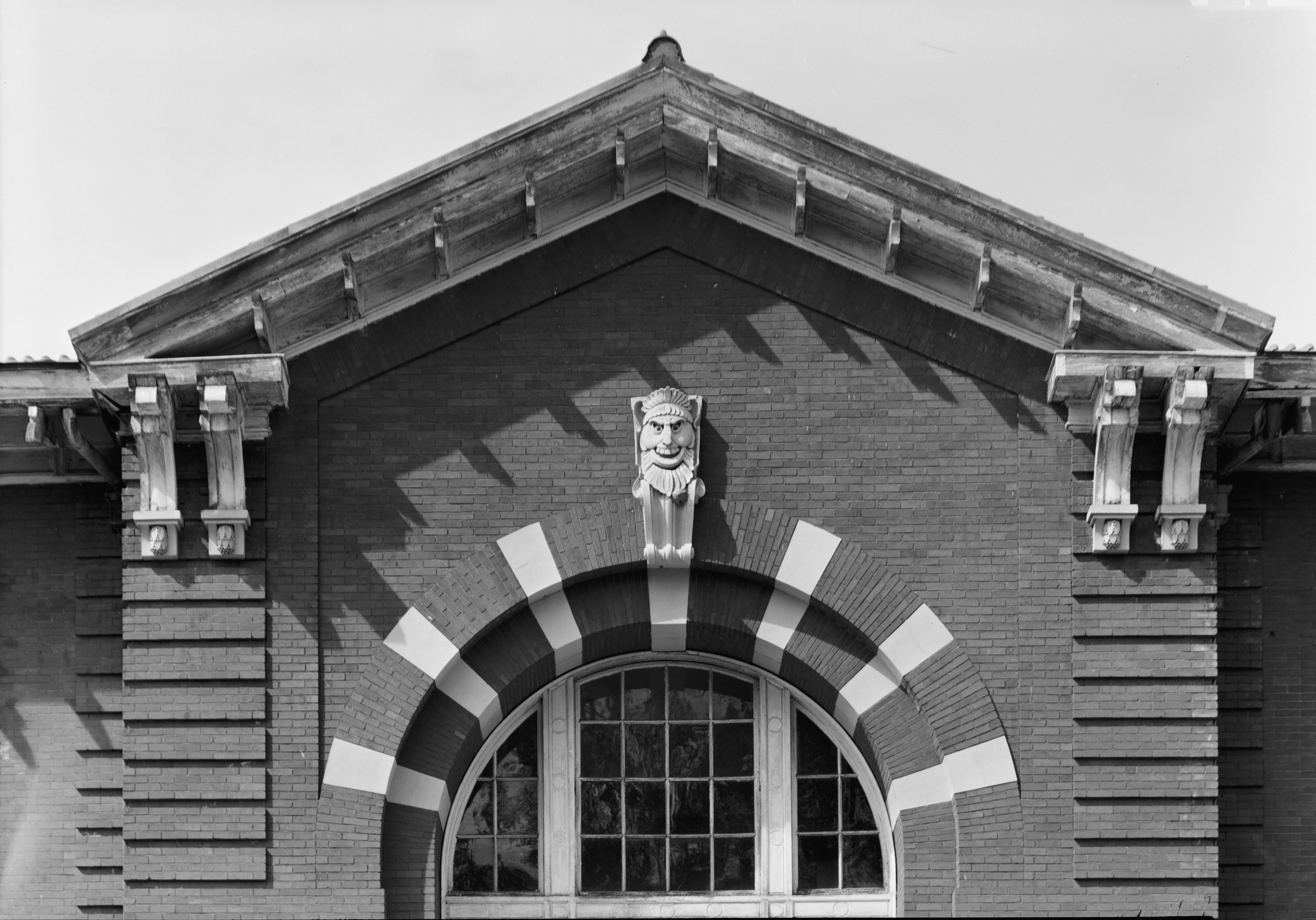
- St. Elizabeths Hospital Tour, 56:38, May 9, 2017, C-SPAN

After several decades in decline, the federal government decided that the large campus could no longer be adequately maintained. In 1987, Congress transferred hospital functions on the East Campus from the United States Department of Health and Human Services to the District of Columbia government, by the St. Elizabeths Hospital and District of Columbia Mental Health Services Act of 1984. The federal government retained ownership of the West Campus. By 2002, all remaining patients on the West Campus were transferred to other facilities.

=== East Campus ===
By 1996, only 850 patients remained at the hospital on the East Campus. The District of Columbia struggled with the poor conditions from years of neglect and inadequate funding: equipment and medicine shortages occurred frequently, and the heating system was broken for weeks at a time. Although the hospital continues to operate, it does so on a far smaller scale than it once did. As of January 31, 2009, the current patient census was 404 in-patients.

In the early 21st century, approximately half of St. Elizabeths' patients are civilly committed to the hospital for treatment. The other half are forensic (criminal) patients. Forensic patients are those who are adjudicated to be criminally insane (not guilty by reason of insanity) or considered incompetent to stand trial. Civil patients are those who are admitted owing to an acute need for psychiatric care. Civil patients can be voluntarily or involuntarily committed for treatment.

In the early 2000s, the U.S. Department of Justice undertook an investigation of the hospital because of allegations that patient rights were being violated. In 2007, the Department of Justice and the District of Columbia reached a settlement over these allegations. DOJ instituted oversight of needed changes. On August 28, 2014, the Department of Justice found that St. Elizabeths had "significantly improved the care and treatment of persons confined to Saint Elizabeths Hospital" and asked a federal court to dismiss the injunction. In January 2015, DC Auditors dismissed the settlement agreement and officially ended oversight of St. Elizabeths Hospital.

A new civil and forensic hospital was built on the East Campus by the District of Columbia Department of Mental Health and opened in the spring of 2010, housing approximately 297 patients. Until the new hospital opened, civil patients were cared for in various buildings on the East Campus. Forensic patients were housed in the John Howard Pavilion. In the new facility, civil and forensic patients live in separate units of the same building. The new hospital also houses a library, an auditorium, multiple computer laboratories, and a small museum in the lobby.

By the early 21st century the District of Columbia had made plans to redevelop St. Elizabeths' East Campus for mixed-use and residential rental property. The first step was construction of an arena for minor league sports. Other buildings on the East Campus were to be renovated for residential and associated retail uses, starting in 2018. The Entertainment and Sports Arena (renamed the CareFirst Arena in 2025) opened on campus on September 22, 2018. It is home to the Washington Mystics of the WNBA and Capital City Go-Go and is also the practice facility for the Washington Wizards of the NBA.

=== West Campus ===
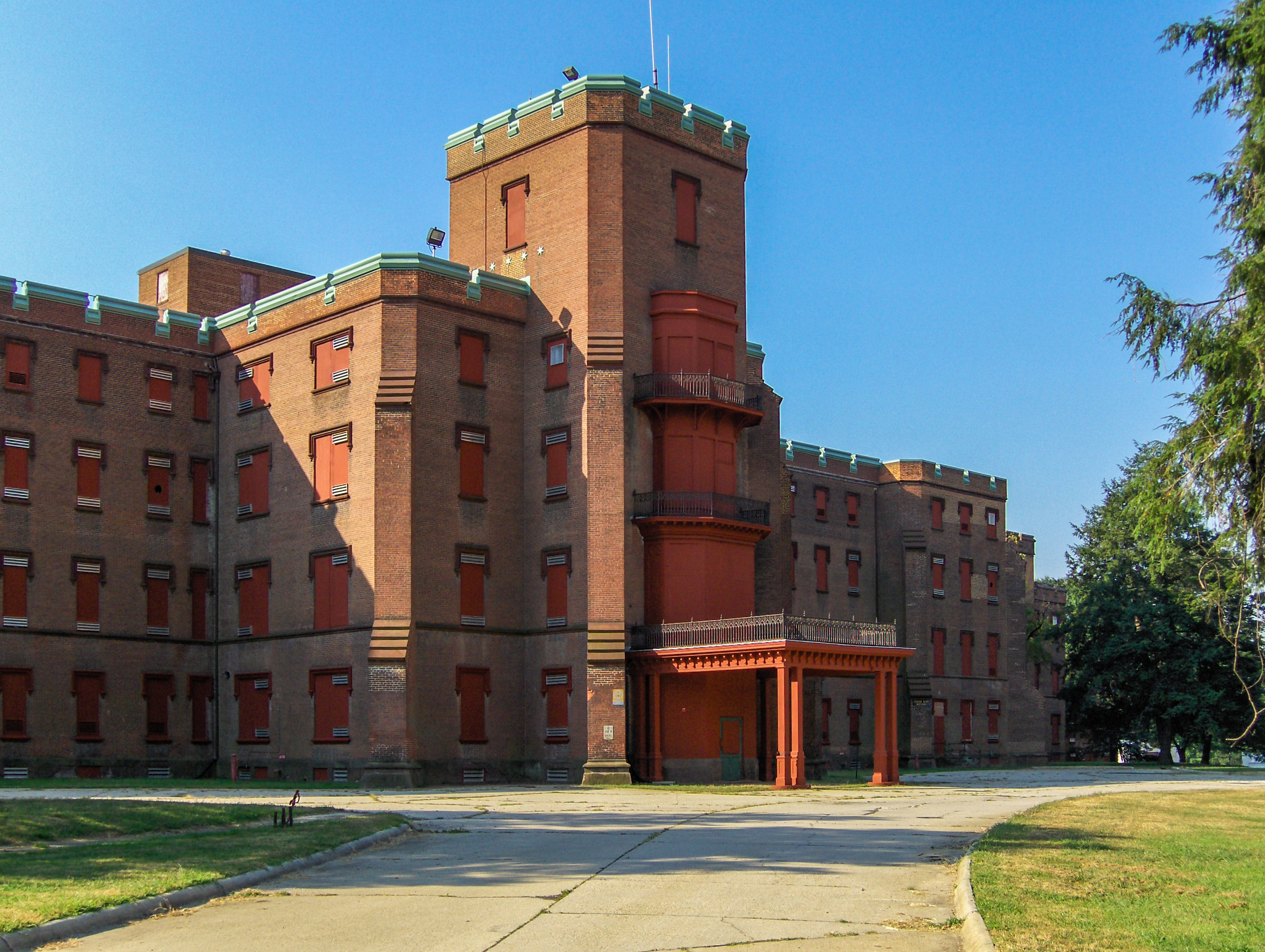
The Center Building at St. Elizabeths in 2006

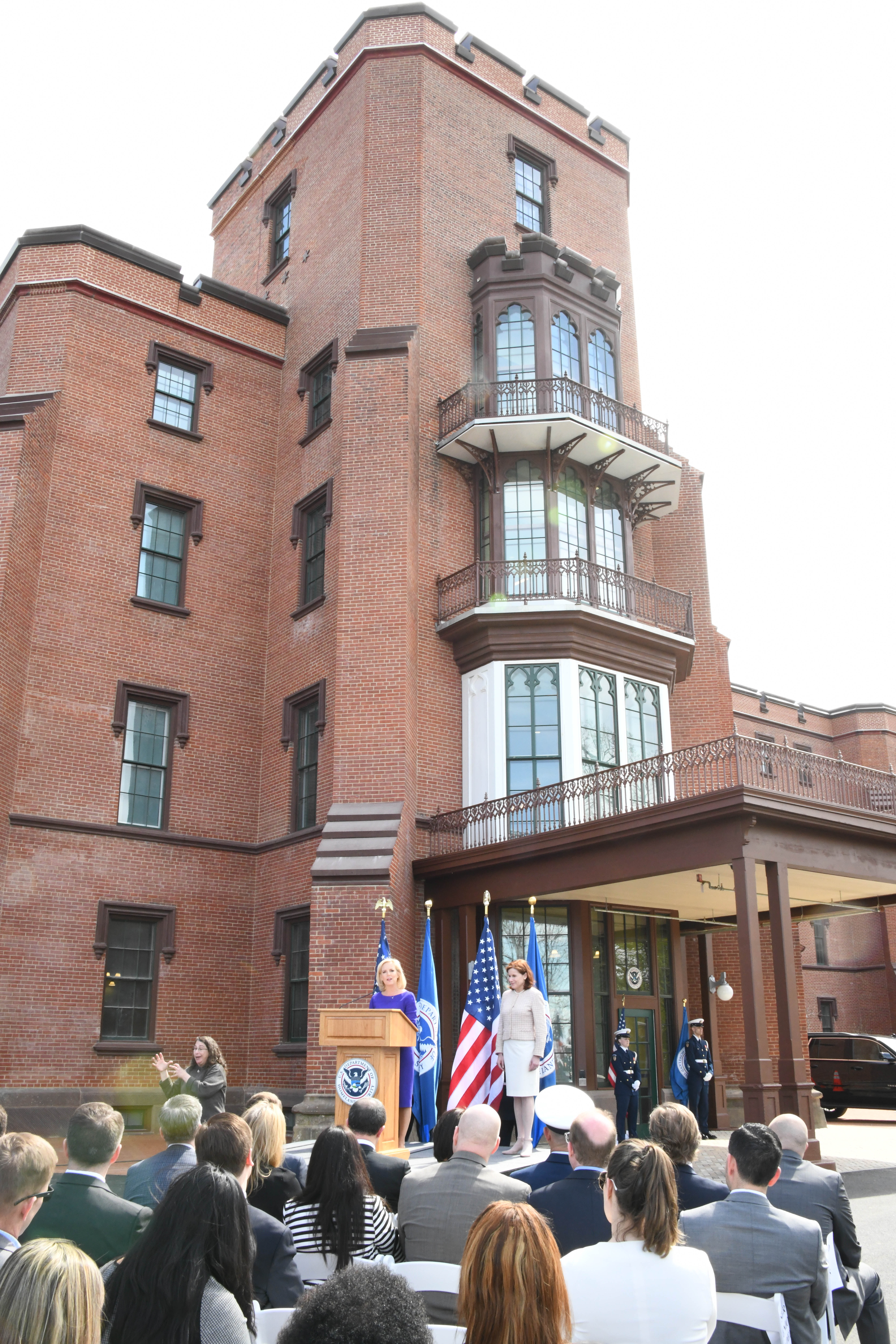
Opening ceremony for the new Department of Homeland Security headquarters in April 2019

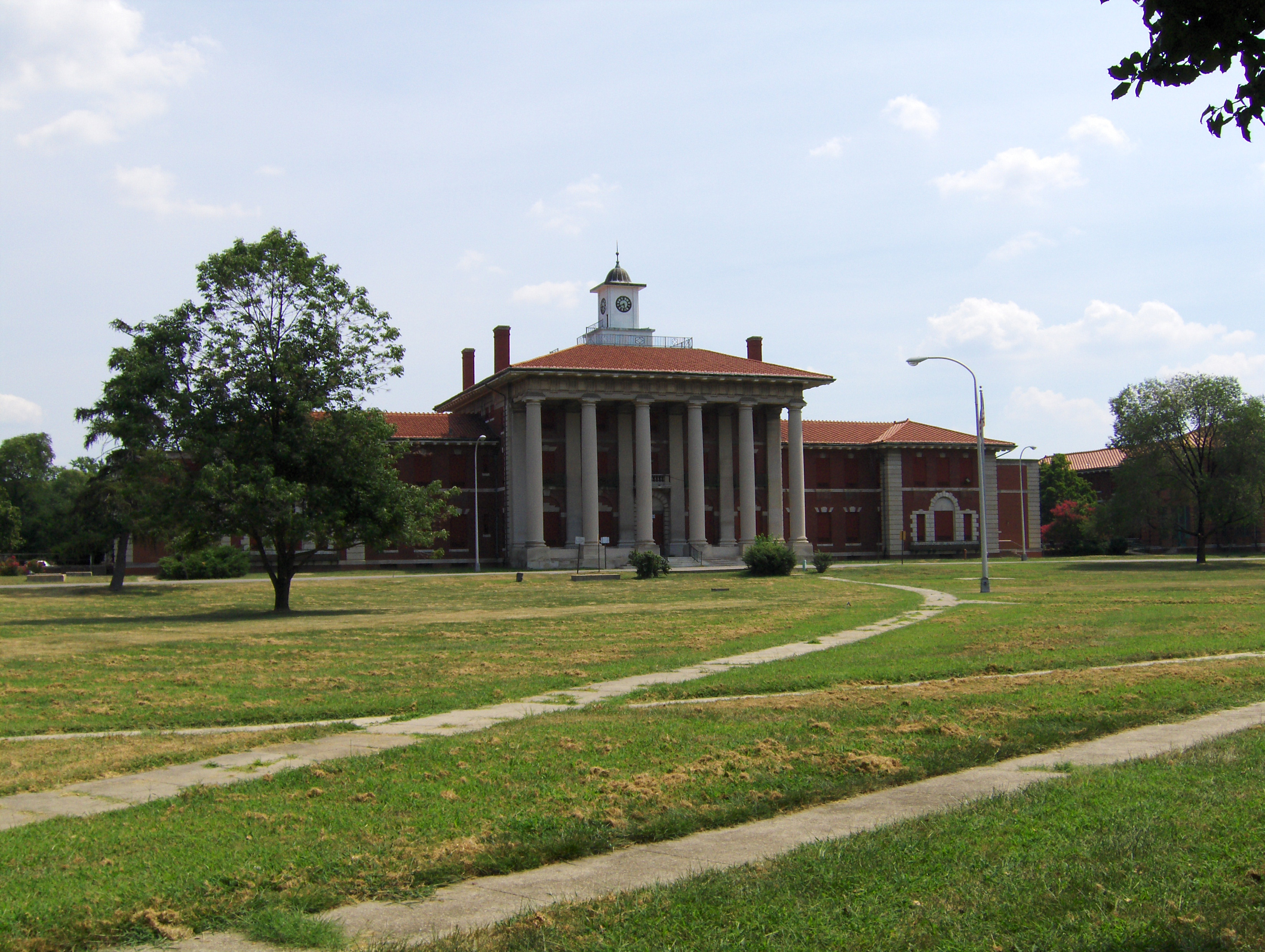
The Main Building on the West Campus in 2006

In 2002 the National Trust for Historic Preservation ranked the hospital complex as one of the nation's "11 Most Endangered Places". After the 1987 separation of the campuses, the D.C. government and its consultants proposed several commercial redevelopment projects for the West Campus, including relocating the University of the District of Columbia to the campus or developing office and retail space. The tremendous cost of bringing existing facilities up to code (estimated at $50–$100 million) kept developers away.

Given little private interest in the site, the federal government sought alternatives within agency needs. Control of the West Campus—home of the oldest building on the campus, the Center Building—was transferred from HHS to the General Services Administration in 2004. GSA improved security around the campus, shored up roofs, and covered windows with plywood in an attempt to secure the buildings and preserve the campus until a tenant could be found.

On March 20, 2007, the Department of Homeland Security (DHS) announced that it would establish a new facility on the West Campus. It planned to spend approximately $4.1 billion for renovations and adaptive reuse of buildings, in order to relocate its headquarters and most of its Washington-based offices to a new 4,500,000-square-foot (420,000 m^{2}) facility on the site. DHS had operations housed in dozens of buildings in the Washington, D.C., area, as several elements of the agency had been independent before its formation. Consolidation of employees from at least 60 facilities to St. Elizabeths was expected to result in a savings of $64 million per year in rental costs. DHS also hoped to improve employee morale and unity within the relatively new agency by having a central location from which to operate.

The plans to relocate DHS to St. Elizabeths were strongly criticized. Historic preservation experts argued that the consolidation plans would result in destruction of dozens of historic buildings on the campus and urged consideration of other alternatives. Community activists expressed concern that the planned high-security facility would be cut off from the surrounding community. They had hoped for agencies with employees who might support neighborhood businesses and shopping, settle in residential areas, and help revitalize the economically depressed area. Access to many areas of the campus, including what was then the abandoned West Campus (which houses the Center Building), was restricted before 2010.

A ceremonial groundbreaking for the DHS consolidated headquarters took place at St. Elizabeths on September 9, 2009. The event was attended by Senator Joseph Lieberman (D-CT), DHS Secretary Janet Napolitano, D.C. Delegate Eleanor Holmes Norton, D.C. Mayor Adrian Fenty, and acting GSA administrator Paul Prouty.

The United States Coast Guard was scheduled to be the first agency on the site in 2010. The relocated U.S. Coast Guard Headquarters Building was projected to open in May 2013, and a ceremony was held in July 2013 at the site. The U.S. Coast Guard Headquarters Building and several former hospital buildings (Atkins Hall, cafeteria) had been rehabilitated to support the new offices.

By 2015, construction began in the Center Building. Initially, this building has been slated for renovation, but internal structures (floors and ceilings) appeared to be beyond repair. The entire Center Building was renovated by removing old internal structures and building new structures to replace them, while retaining the historic facades. Between March and April 2019, the Department's Headquarters components moved to Center Building.

By April 2020, because of the surge in the COVID-19 pandemic and illness among staff, the DHS National Operations Center relocated to Mount Weather in an effort to reduce or prevent infections of critical personnel. Kristi Noem, the United States Secretary of Homeland Security, sought permission in late 2025 to demolish some of the West Campus buildings, citing safety and national-security issues. Preservationists objected to the proposed demolition because the request had come at such short notice. In August, engineers working for the General Services Administration found the 13 buildings "are generally in stable condition".

Department of Homeland Security employees voiced concerns in early 2026 about being exposed to asbestos during demolition of nearby buildings. The Department of Homeland Security employees said that they were not provided with masks or respirators and were told that they must report to their offices despite their concerns of asbestos exposure. The Department of Homeland Security employees said that construction workers wore hazmat suits and respirators and that the sign near the entryway warning of asbestos exposure was very small and easy to miss.

== Notable resident patients ==
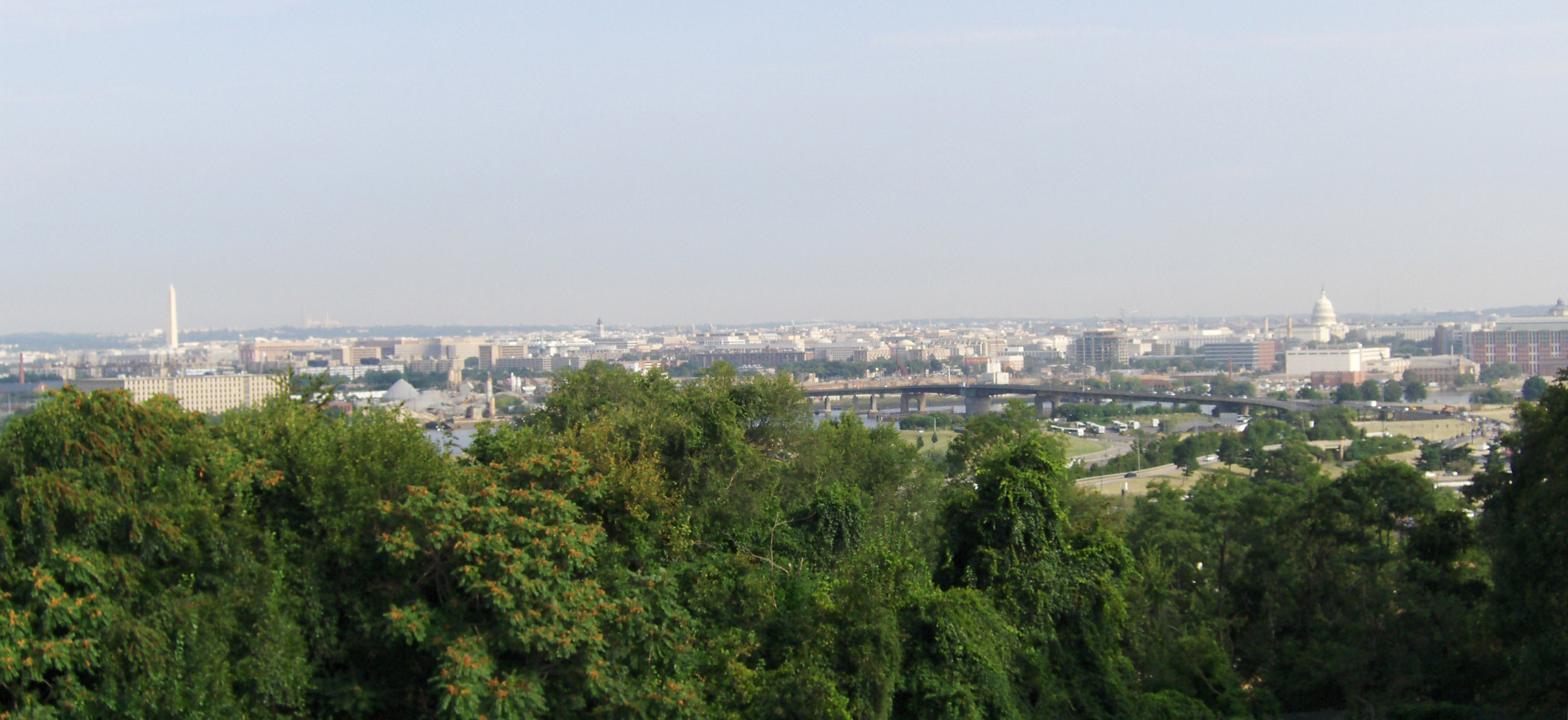
The view of the Washington, D.C., skyline from St. Elizabeths

Well-known patients of St. Elizabeths have included would-be presidential assassins Richard Lawrence, who attempted to kill Andrew Jackson, and John Hinckley Jr., who shot Ronald Reagan. Hinckley was released in 2016, subject to a number of restrictions. The court lifted all restrictions in 2022. Charles J. Guiteau, who assassinated President James Garfield, was held here until he was executed.

Notable residents from civil commitments were Mary Fuller, a stage and silent film actress and early star; William Chester Minor, who made major contributions to the Oxford English Dictionary while committed to an asylum in Great Britain; American poet Ezra Pound, a fascist collaborator during World War II; and Frances Wieser, a scientific illustrator. James Swann, a late 20th-century serial killer in the Washington, D.C., area, has been a forensic patient since 1994.

According to reporter Kelly Patricia O'Meara, St. Elizabeths is believed to have treated more than 125,000 patients; an exact number is not known because of poor record keeping and the division of responsibilities among different agencies over the years. Additionally, thousands of patients appear to have been buried in unmarked graves across the campus. Records for individuals buried in the graves have been lost. O'Meara has suggested that some bodies may have been cremated in the incinerator on-site. The General Services Administration, current owner of the property, considered using ground-penetrating radar to attempt to locate unmarked graves, but has yet to do so.

More than 15,000 known autopsies were performed at St. Elizabeths from 1884 through 1982. A collection of over 1,400 brains preserved in formaldehyde, 5,000 photographs of brains, and 100,000 slides of brain tissue was maintained by the hospital until the collection was transferred to a museum in 1986, according to O'Meara. In addition to mental health patients buried on the campus, several hundred American Civil War soldiers are interred at St. Elizabeths.

== Contributions to medicine ==
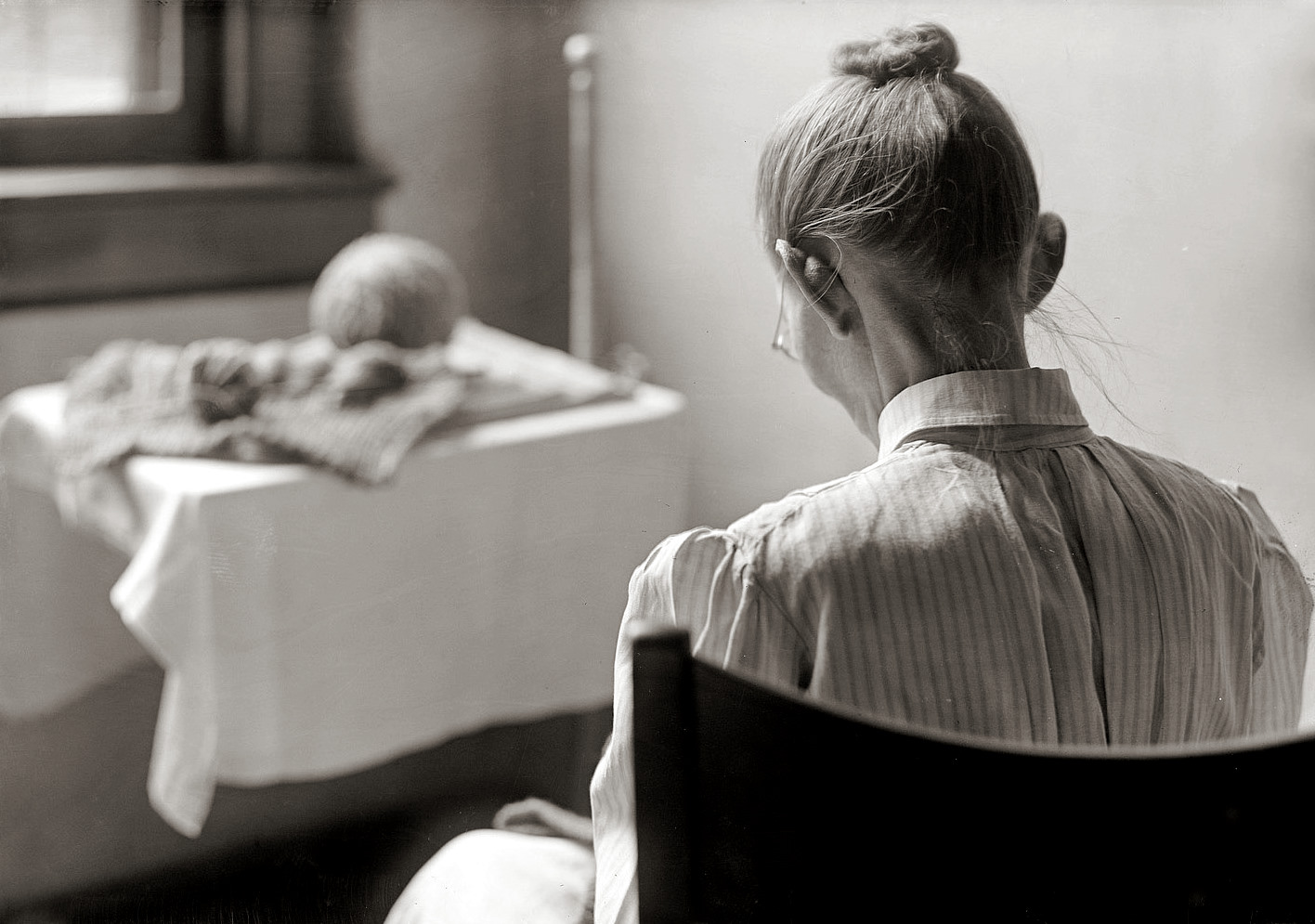
An elderly patient at St. Elizabeths, c. 1917

Several important therapeutic techniques were pioneered at St. Elizabeths, and it served as a model for later institutions. It was the first to use hydrotherapy, Freudian psychoanalytic techniques, dance therapy and psychodrama, for instance. Walter Freeman, onetime laboratory director, was inspired by St. Elizabeths to pioneer the transorbital lobotomy. It was used to treat epilepsy and some psychiatric conditions.

During American involvement in World War II, the Office of Strategic Services (OSS), the predecessor to the Central Intelligence Agency, used facilities and staff at St. Elizabeths Hospital to test "truth serums". OSS tested a mescaline and scopolamine cocktail as a truth drug on two volunteers at St. Elizabeths Hospital, but found the combination unsuccessful. Separate tests of THC as a truth serum were equally unsuccessful.

In 1963, Dr. Luther D. Robinson, the first African American superintendent of St. Elizabeths, founded the mental health program for the deaf. Throughout his career he was a leading authority on treating deaf patients with brain disorders.

== Facilities and grounds ==
An 1860 topographic map of the Saint Elizabeths Hospital campus

The hospital's West Campus plan in 1937

The campus of St. Elizabeths is located on bluffs overlooking the confluence of the Potomac and Anacostia rivers in the southeast quadrant of Washington, D.C. It is divided by Martin Luther King Jr. Avenue between the 118-acre (48 ha) East Campus (now owned by the D.C. government) and the 182-acre (74 ha) West Campus (owned by the federal government). It has many important historic buildings, foremost among them the Center Building, designed according to the principles of the Kirkbride Plan by Thomas U. Walter (1804–87). He is notable as the primary architect of the expansion of the U.S. Capitol that was begun in 1851.
