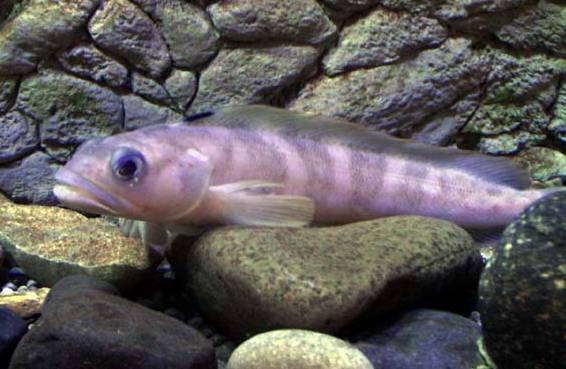
- Searcher (Bathymaster signatus)

Scientific classification
- Kingdom: Animalia
- Phylum: Chordata
- Class: Actinopterygii
- Order: Perciformes
- Suborder: Zoarcoidei
- Family: Bathymasteridae; D. S. Jordan & C. H. Gilbert, 1883

Genera
- see text

= Ronquil =

Ronquils

Family of fishes

Ronquils (sometimes spelt ronchils) is a small family marine ray-finned fish, the Bathymasteridae. These fishes are found only in Arctic and North Pacific waters. This family contains just seven species in three genera. The larger species are important to commercial fisheries as food fish. Ronquils are most closely related to the eelpouts and prowfish in the suborder Zoarcoidei of the order Scorpaeniformes.

== Taxonomy ==
The Bathymasteridae was first proposed as a family in 1883 by the American ichthyologists David Starr Jordan and Charles Henry Gilbert. The 5th edition of Fishes of the World classifies this family within the suborder Zoarcoidei, within the order Scorpaeniformes. Other authorities classify this family in the infraorder Zoarcales within the suborder Cottoidei of the Perciformes because removing the Scorpaeniformes from the Perciformes renders that taxon non monophyletic. The monophyly of the Zoarcoidei has still not been fully ascertained but it is generally accepted that the most basal family is Bathymasteridae.

== Etymology ==
The name ronquil is said to be an anglicization from the Spanish ronco, ronquillo being a diminutive, and which means "one who grunts". The family name Bathymasteridae is derived from the type genus Bathymaster and this can be translated from the Greek to mean "deep searcher".

== Genera ==
The ronquil family contains seven species divided into three genera as follows:

- Bathymaster Cope, 1873
- Rathbunella Jordan & Evermann, 1896
- Ronquilus Jordan & Starks, 1895

== Characteristics ==
Ronquils have elongate with long dorsal and anal fins which are even in height along all of their length. These fins are separated from the large, truncate to round caudal fin by a clear caudal peduncle. There are between 43 and 49 branched and unbranched rays in the dorsal fin while the anal fin contains between 31 and 36 rays. These ray counts include between 1 and 6 weak, pliant to the front of the dorsal fin and 1 or 2 similar spines in the front of the anal fin. The pectoral fins are large and rounded while the pelvic fins are located on the thorax, and have a single spine and 5 soft rays. There is a single pair of nostrils. The scales vary from weakly ctenoid, nearly smooth, to strongly ctenoid. There are sensory pores on the upper head of head and on the cheeks and these are obvious. The lateral line is clearly visible and runs on the upper body, straight to the rear of the dorsal fin, and has between 75 and 105 scales. The roof of the mouth has palatine and vomerine teeth. The bill membrane is separate from the isthmus, in most cases. There is no swim bladder. These fishes may be olive brown to dull red, bluish black, or purplish in their overall colour, they can be marked with bright green, blue, yellow, red, orange, and white bars, spots or other markings. The colour and patterns often vary between populations or be an expression of sexual dimorphism. Ronquins vary in size from a total length of 20 cm (7.9 in) in Ronquilus jordani to more over 38 cm (15 in) for Bathymaster signatus.

== Distribution, habitat and behaviour ==
Ronqulis inhabit cold waters in the North Pacific where they have a wide range from Baja California to the Sea of Japan, ronquils are benthic animals, spending most of their time on or near the bottom. These fishes are typically found in shallow coastal waters down to depths of around 200 m (660 ft), however, Bathymaster signatus has been taken from depths in excess of 300 m (980 ft) in the Bering Sea and Aleutian Islands.

Ronquils feed primarily on small benthic crustaceans and mollusks, and the stomachs of some specimens sampled contained only nudibranch]s. Little is known about predators of ronqulis but it is presumed that most larger carnivores that occur in the same areas as them, especially predatory fishes, will prey on them. Although considered fairly common, ronquils are rarely observed; this is likely owing to their secretive nature.

Few specifics are recorded regarding ronquil spawning, but the males are known to guard the brood. The males have been known to cannibalize some of the eggs they are guarding.

== See also ==
- List of fish common names
- List of fish families
