= 1908 in poetry =

List of years in poetry	(table)
- … 1898; 1899; 1900; 1901; 1902; 1903; 1904; 1905; 1906; 1907; 1908; 1909; 1910; 1911; 1912; 1913; 1914; 1915; 1916; 1917; 1918 …
- In literature 1905 1906 1907 1908 1909 1910 1911
- Art; Archaeology; Architecture; Literature; Music; Philosophy; Science; +...

Nationality words link to articles with information on the nation's poetry or literature (for instance, Irish or France).

== Events ==
- March – Ezra Pound leaves America for Europe. In April, he moves to Venice, where in July he self-publishes his first collection of poems, A Lume Spento (dedicated to his friend Philadelphia artist William Brooke Smith, who has just died of tuberculosis). In August he settles in London, where he will remain until 1920 and in December publish A Quinzaine for this Yule.
- Summer – The Marlowe Society stages a production at the New Theatre, Cambridge (England), of Milton's masque Comus directed by Rupert Brooke.
- Renée Vivien attempts suicide by overdose of laudanum at the Savoy Hotel in London.

=== The Poets' Club ===
- Founding in London of the Poets' Club, a group comprising mainly amateurs who meet monthly for most of the year.
- Late in the year – T. E. Hulme reads to the Poets' Club his paper, A Lecture on Modern Poetry, a concise statement of his influential advocacy of free verse.

== Works published in English ==
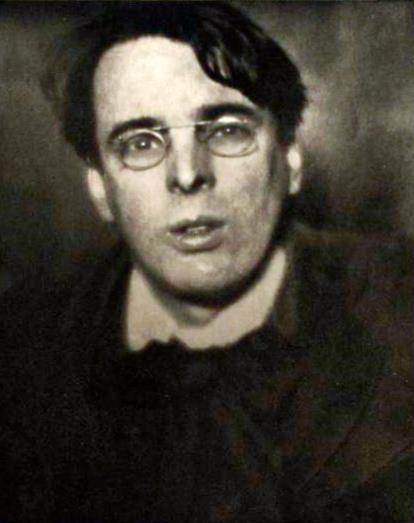
W. B. Yeats in Dublin on 24 January 1908

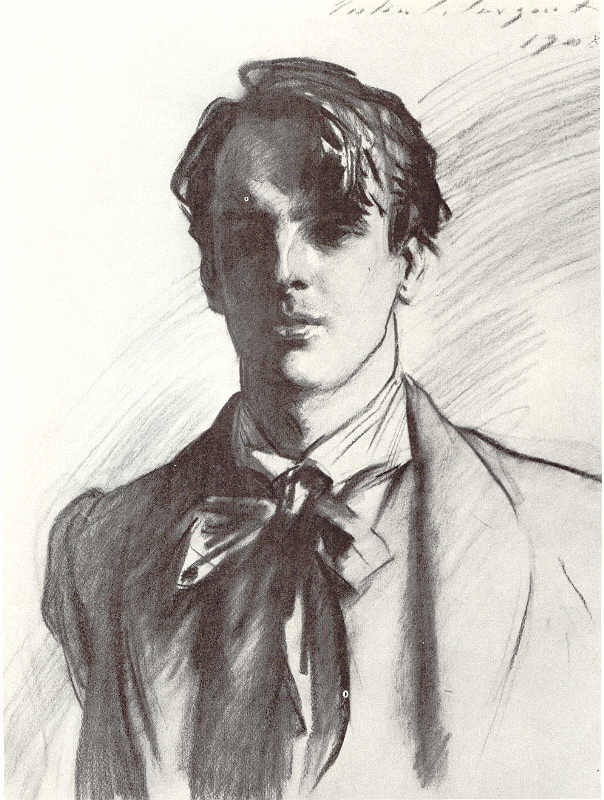
1908 Portrait of W. B. Yeats by John Singer Sargent

=== Canada ===
- William Wilfred Campbell, Poetical Tragedies including "Mordred", "Daulac", "Morning" and "Hildebrand"
- William Henry Drummond, The Great Fight: Poems and Sketches. New York: G.P. Putnam’s Sons.

=== United Kingdom ===
- Lascelles Abercrombie, Interludes and Poems
- Hilaire Belloc, Cautionary Tales for Children
- William Henry Davies, Nature Poems and Others
- Edmund Gosse, The Autumn Garden
- Thomas Hardy, The Dynasts: Part 3
- Minnie Louise Haskins, The Desert, including the poem The Gate of the Year
- Edith Nesbit, Ballads and Lyrics of Socialism
- Stephen Phillips, New Poems
- Ezra Pound, A Quinzaine for this Yule, American poet published in the United Kingdom
- Katharine Tynan, Experiences, Irish poet published in the United Kingdom
- William Butler Yeats, The Collected Works in Verse and Prose, Irish poet published in the United Kingdom

=== United States ===
- William Stanley Braithwaite, The House of Falling Leaves with Other Poems
- Ezra Pound, American poet published in the United Kingdom and Italy:
  - A Lume Spento, Pound's first poetry collection (the title translates as "a dim light") published at his own expense in Venice
  - A Quinzaine for this Yule, London
- George Sterling, A Wine of Wizardry and Other Poems

=== Other in English ===
- John Le Gay Brereton, Sea and Sky, Australia
- Katharine Tynan, Experiences, Irish poet published in the United Kingdom
- Albert D. Watson, The Wing of the Wild-Bird
- William Butler Yeats, The Collected Works in Verse and Prose, Irish poet published in the United Kingdom

== Works published in other languages ==
=== French language ===
==== France ====
- Francis Jammes:
  - Poèmes mesurés
  - Rayons de miel, Paris: Bibliothèque de l'Occident
- Valery Larbaud, Les Poésies de A. O. Barnabooth

==== Canada, in French ====
- Louis-Joseph Doucet, La Chanson du Passant, French language, Canada
- Albert Ferland, Le Canada Chante, French language, Canada

=== Other ===
- C. Subrahamania Bharati, Cutecakitankal, Indian, Tamil-language
- José Santos Chocano, Fiat Lux, Peru
- Louis-Joseph Doucet, Chanson du passant; French language;, Canada
- Albert Ferland, Le Canada chanté, in four volumes, published from this year to 1910, French language, Canada
- Kahlil Gibran, Al-Arwah al-Mutamarrida ("Rebellious Spirits"), Lebanese-born Arabic poet in the United States
- Maria Konopnicka, Rota ("Oath"), Polish

== Awards and honors ==
- Newdigate Prize (University of Oxford) – Julian Huxley, "Holyrood"
- Gaisford Prize for Greek Verse Composition (University of Oxford) – Ronald Knox

== Births ==
Death years link to the corresponding "[year] in poetry" article:

- February 4 – Julian Bell (killed 1937), English poet, and a member of a family whose notable members include his parents, Clive and Vanessa Bell; his aunt, Virginia Woolf; his younger brother, writer Quentin Bell; and writer and painter Angelica Garnett, his half-sister
- March 8 – Ebrahim Al-Arrayedh (إبراهيم العريّض) (died 2002), Indian-born Bahraini poet
- April 2 – Ronald McCuaig (died 1993), Australian poet and writer
- April 15 – Denis Devlin (died 1959), Irish modernist poet and career diplomat
- April 24 – George Oppen (died 1984), American poet, winner of the 1969 Pulitzer Prize in poetry
- May 25 – Theodore Roethke (died 1963), American poet
- June 14 – Kathleen Jessie Raine (died 2003), English poet, critic and scholar
- August 19 – Josephine Jacobsen (died 2003), American poet, short story writer and critic
- September 9 – Cesare Pavese (suicide 1950), Italian poet, novelist, literary critic and translator
- October 9 – Harry Hooton (died 1961), Australian poet and anarchist
- October 12 – Paul Engle (died 1991), American poet, writer, editor and novelist
- November 28 – Mary Oppen (died 1990), American activist, artist, photographer and writer
- November 30
  - Buddhadeb Bosu (died 1974), Bengali poet
  - Eric Irvin (died 1992), Australian

== Deaths ==
- January 15 – James Ryder Randall (born 1839), American journalist and poet
- January 16 – Edmund Clarence Stedman (born 1833), American poet, critic, essayist, banker and scientist
- February 22 – Eliza A. Pittsinger (died 1837), American, "The California Poetess"
- May 23 – François Coppée (born 1842), French writer, le poète des humbles
- May 27 – Alexander Posey (born 1873), Native American poet, humorist, journalist and politician
- June 23 – Kunikida Doppo 國木田 獨歩 (born 1871), Japanese Meiji period romantic poet and one of the novelists who pioneered naturalism in Japan
- September 21 – Ernest Fenollosa (born 1853), American orientalist
- October 21 – Charles Eliot Norton (born 1827), American scholar and man of letters

== See also ==
- 20th century in poetry
- 20th century in literature
- List of years in poetry
- List of years in literature
- French literature of the 20th century
- Silver Age of Russian Poetry
- Young Poland (Młoda Polska) a modernist period in Polish arts and literature, roughly from 1890 to 1918
- Poetry
