= Endon and Stanley =

Civil parish in Staffordshire, England

Coordinates: 53.0738°N 2.1083°W

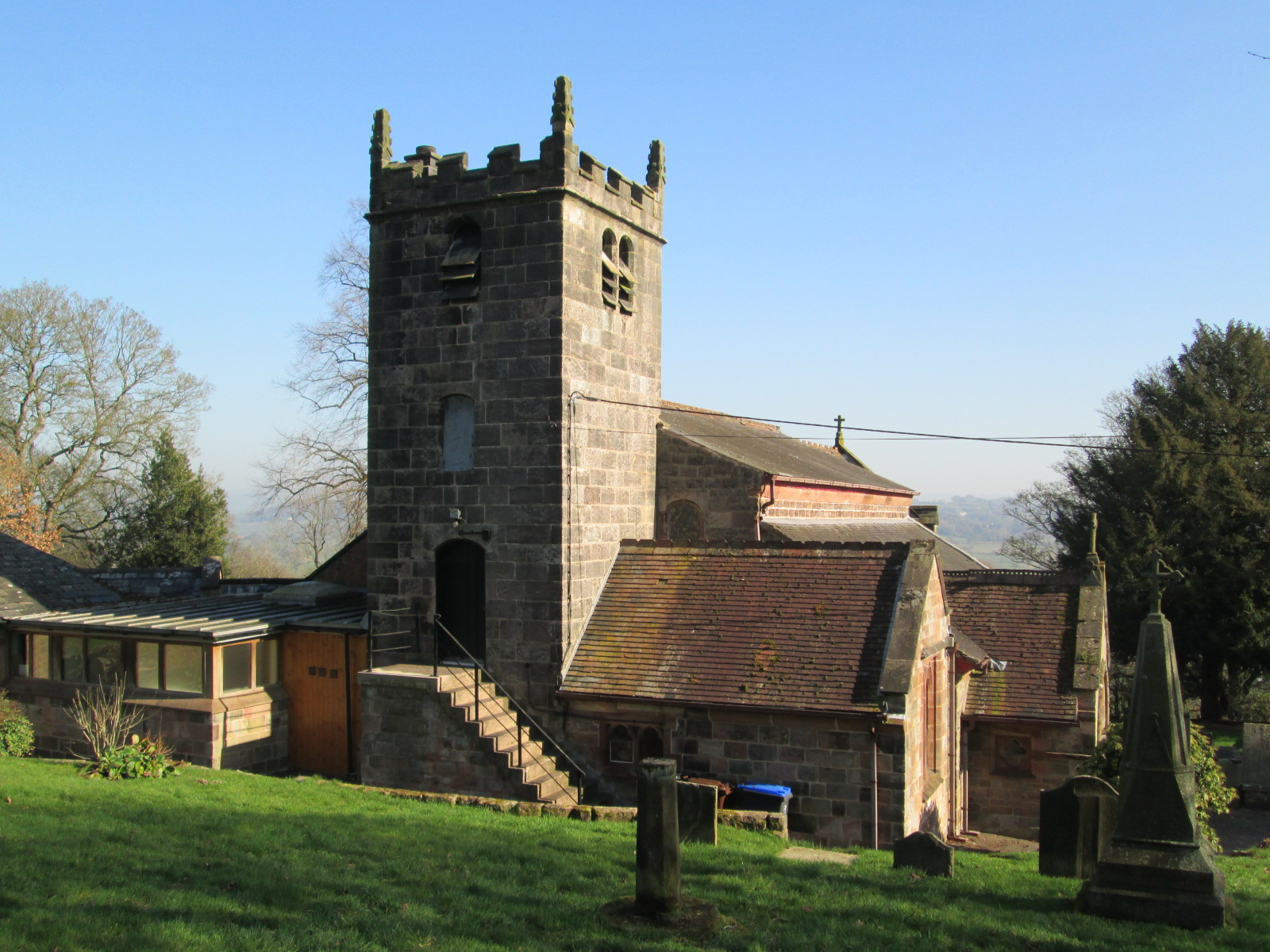
St Luke's Church, Endon

Endon and Stanley is a civil parish in Staffordshire, England, containing the villages Endon and Stanley.

The civil parish (replacing a civil parish containing Endon, Stanley and Longsdon) was formed in 1894.

== See also ==
- Listed buildings in Endon and Stanley
