= Listed buildings in Longsdon =

Longsdon is a civil parish in the district of Staffordshire Moorlands, Staffordshire, England. It contains 19 listed buildings that are recorded in the National Heritage List for England. Of these, two are at Grade II*, the middle of the three grades, and the others are at Grade II, the lowest grade. The parish contains the village of Longsdon and the surrounding area. The Leek Branch of the Caldon Canal passes through the parish, and the listed buildings associated with this are four bridges and a tunnel entrance. The other listed buildings consist of houses and associated structures, farmhouses and farm buildings, a milepost, and a church.

== Key ==
Grade	Criteria
II*	Particularly important buildings of more than special interest
II	Buildings of national importance and special interest

== Buildings ==
Name and location	Photograph	Date	Notes	Grade
Dunwood House Farmhouse; 53.09507°N 2.07928°W	—	17th century	The farmhouse was restored and altered in the 19th century. It is in stone, and has a tile roof with verge parapets on shaped kneelers. There is an L-shaped plan, with a front range of two storeys and an attic and three bays, and a lower rear wing. In the centre is a gabled porch, and to the left is a lean-to bay window. The other windows have chamfered mullions and hood moulds, there are three gabled dormers on kneelers, and at the rear is a transomed full-height stair window.	II
Stonelowe Hall; 53.08918°N 2.06762°W	—	17th century	A farmhouse that was restored in 1866 and later enlarged, it is in stone, and has a tile roof with verge parapets. There are two storeys, a main range of five bays, a single-storey well-house to the left, and a later two-storey two-bay wing recessed on the left. The main range has two gables with an embattled parapet between. Above the doorway is a steeply pitched pediment with an inscription and date in the tympanum, and the windows have chamfered mullions.	II
Barn southwest of Stonelowe Hall; 53.08873°N 2.06797°W	—	17th century	The barn, which was later extended, is in stone, and has a blue tile roof with verge parapets, moulded copings, and ball finials. It has two levels, consisting of a hay loft over a shippon, and there is a single-storey two-bay extension to the left, and a two-storey, one-bay extension recessed to the right. The barn contains double hay loft doors, casement windows, a sliding door, and two rows of vents.	II
Rowley Gate Farmhouse; 53.10516°N 2.06780°W	—	1686	A stone farmhouse with a string course, and a tile roof with verge parapets. There are two storeys and three bays. On the front is a gabled two-storey porch that has an entrance with a Tudor arch and a pediment with an inscription and date. Some windows have chamfered mullions, and others are later casements.	II
Harracles Hall; 53.11283°N 2.06761°W	—	Early 18th century	A small country house built for Josiah Wedgwood, it is in red brick with stone dressings on a moulded plinth, with rusticated quoins, a string course, an eaves band and a hipped red tile roof. There are two storeys, and an L-shaped plan, with a west front of seven bays, the middle three bays projecting under a pediment containing a low-relief festooned cartouche. The central entrance has a moulded surround, a keystone, and a broken segmental pediment on corbels. The windows are cross-casements with moulded surrounds. The south front has five bays.	II*
West tunnel entrance and screen wall 53.08623°N 2.03876°W		1801	The tunnel is on the Leek Branch of the Caldon Canal. The portal at the west end is in stone, and the tunnel entrance has an elliptical arch, above which is a plaque with pilasters. The screen wall is slightly concave, and has a parapet and end piers.	II
Longsdon Grange; 53.10830°N 2.07002°W	—	1817	A stone farmhouse with a parapet ramped up to the centre, and a tile roof. There are two storeys, a square plan, and two bays. The windows are sashes with hood moulds.	II
Bridge No. 4; 53.08023°N 2.06611°W		Early 19th century	The bridge carries Denford Road over the Leek Branch of the Caldon Canal. It is in stone, and consists of a single elliptical arch. The bridge has concave sides, a string course, and parapets with rounded copings. The carriageway is ramped to north over the bridge.	II
Bridge No. 5; 53.07988°N 2.06178°W	—	Early 19th century	An accommodation bridge over the Leek Branch of the Caldon Canal, it is in stone, and consists of a single elliptical arch. The bridge has slightly concave walls ending in piers, a string course, and parapets with rounded copings cambered over the carriageway.	II
Bridge No. 6; 53.08131°N 2.05825°W		Early 19th century	The bridge carries Sutherland Road over the Leek Branch of the Caldon Canal. It is in stone, and consists of a single elliptical arch. The bridge has slightly concave walls ending in piers, a string course, and slightly cambered parapets with rounded copings.	II
Bridge No. 7; 53.08012°N 2.05343°W		Early 19th century	An accommodation bridge over the Leek Branch of the Caldon Canal, it is in sandstone, and consists of a single elliptical arch. The bridge has a string course, slightly cambered parapets with chamfered half-round coping, and square piers at the ends.	II
Barn and stables southeast of Harracles Hall; 53.11250°N 2.06770°W	—	Early 19th century	The building is in stone and has blue tile roofs with verge parapets. It forms a U-shaped plan, and there are two levels, with hay lofts over stables and a byre. The openings include hay loft doors, top-hung casement windows, a full-height segmental-arched entry, and stable doors. In the gable end are three tiers of pigeon nesting boxes.	II
Milepost; 53.08639°N 2.07859°W		Early 19th century	The mileopst is on the north side of the A53 road. It is in cast iron, about 500 millimetres (20 in) high, and consists of a circular shaft with flute conical capping, and two panels. The panels indicate the distances to Leek, Newcastle-under-Lyme, and Burslem.	II
Trees Farmhouse; 53.08771°N 2.08689°W	—	Early 19th century	The farmhouse is in red brick, and has a tile roof with verge parapets on kneelers. There are two storeys and an attic, three bays, and a small extension to the right. In the centre is a doorway with a keystone, and the windows are cross-casements, also with keystones.	II
Barn east of Rowley Gate Farmhouse; 53.10512°N 2.06745°W	—	Mid 19th century	The barn is in stone, and has a blue tile roof with verge parapets. There are two levels, and a long front of about 20 metres (66 ft). The barn contains a stable door and a blocked window.	II
Gate piers and wall, Stonelowe Hall; 53.08905°N 2.06762°W	—	Mid 19th century	The boundary wall at the front of the garden is in stone with twice-chamfered coping. It is about 30 metres (98 ft) long and 1 metre (3 ft 3 in) high, and is ramped up to the gate piers, which are square and have moulded capping and ball finials. To the right is a mounting block with five steps.	II
Dunwood Hall, steps and urns 53.08720°N 2.08090°W	—	1871	A house in Gothic style, it is built in stone with quoins, and has a slate roof with verge parapets, and decorative cast iron ridges. There are two storeys and an attic, a radial plan with a central hall, and a three-storey entrance tower. The tower has string courses, a quatrefoil modillion frieze, a moulded cornice with gargoyles, and a hipped roof. Steps lead up to a four-centred arched doorway that has shafts with foliaged capitals, a fanlight, and a fleur-de-lys finial, and flanking the doorway are large urns. Above it is a three-sided oriel window, and over that are three single lights. The outer bays contain chamfered mullioned and transomed windows and gabled half-dormers.	II
Stables and coach house, Dunwood Hall; 53.08739°N 2.08050°W	—	c. 1871	The building is in pink sandstone with yellow sandstone dressings, a moulded eaves band, and a Westmorland slate roof with verge parapets. There are two levels, and an L-shaped plan. The centre is gabled and contains a Tudor arched coach entry, above which is an octagonal cupola with a broached flèche.	II
St Chad's Church; 53.08878°N 2.06255°W		1903–05	The church, designed by Gerald Horsley, is built in stone with blue tile roofs. It consists of a nave, a north aisle, a chancel with a vestry, and a west steeple with a south porch. The steeple has a three-stage tower with angle buttresses, a half-octagonal stair turret on the south side, a six-light west window with a pointed head, and a broach spire with massive gargoyles and two tiers of gabled lucarnes.	II*
