= Listed buildings in Endon and Stanley =

Endon and Stanley is a civil parish in the district of Staffordshire Moorlands, Staffordshire, England. It contains 48 listed buildings that are recorded in the National Heritage List for England. Of these, one is at Grade II*, the middle of the three grades, and the others are at Grade II, the lowest grade. The parish contains the villages of Endon and Stanley and the surrounding area. The Caldon Canal runs through the parish and makes a junction with its Leek Branch in the parish. The listed buildings associated with the canal are bridges, locks, a side pond, and a lock keeper's cottage. Most of the other listed buildings are houses, cottages and associated structures, farmhouses and farm buildings. The rest of the listed buildings include a church and items in the churchyard, and three mileposts.

== Key ==
Grade	Criteria
II*	Particularly important buildings of more than special interest
II	Buildings of national importance and special interest

== Buildings ==
Name and location	Photograph	Date	Notes	Grade
Brook Cottage; 53.08356°N 2.10557°W		16th century	The house has a cruck construction, it was refaced the 17th century and largely rebuilt in the 19th century. It is mainly in red brick, with some remaining stone, and has a tile roof. There are two storeys and two bays. On the front is a gabled porch, the windows are 19th-century casements, and inside there is a cruck frame.	II
Sutton House; 53.08132°N 2.10756°W	—	16th century	The farmhouse has a timber framed core, the exterior has almost been replaced by stone, and a roof is of slate and tile with verge parapets. There are two storeys and an attic, and an H-shaped plan, consisting of a central range and projecting gabled cross-wings, the right wing the wider. In the central range is a three-sided bay window with a hipped roof. The left gable contains chamfered mullioned windows, and the windows in the central range and right wing are sashes. On the south side of the left wing is timber framing on a plinth.	II
Manor Farmhouse; 53.07951°N 2.09769°W	—	1597	The farmhouse, which was altered and extended in the 19th century, is in stone, and has a roof of stone or slate with verge parapets. The entrance front has two storeys, the main block to the right has three bays, to the left is a lower bay, and further to the left is another, still lower, bay. The main block contains sash windows and in the left bay is a casement window. At the rear are two storeys and an attic and two gables containing three-light Gothic casements in the lower floors, and mullioned attic windows. In the parapet between the gables is a dated panel.	II
Brook Cottages; 53.08356°N 2.10507°W	—	17th century	A farmhouse that was extended in the 18th century, altered in the 20th century, and divided into two units. The building is in stone, the right bay is faced in brick, and it has a verge parapet on the right with pitched coping on corbelled kneelers. On the front is a projecting porch with a pediment and a ball finial. The windows are mullioned and there is also an oculus.	II
Hallwater Farmhouse; 53.08045°N 2.10580°W	—	17th century	The farmhouse, which was altered and extended in the 19th century, is in stone with a tile roof. There are two storeys, an L-shaped plan with two parallel ranges, and an entrance front of two gabled bays. The windows have chamfered mullions.	II
Hollin House; 53.08816°N 2.12456°W	—	17th century	A stone farmhouse with a tile roof that has verge parapets with pitched copings on corbelled kneelers. There are two storeys and an attic, and three bays. In the centre is a doorway with a restored lintel. The windows have chamfered mullions, and there are three gabled dormers.	II
Barn north of Lanehead Farmhouse; 53.09289°N 2.12883°W	—	17th century	The barn was altered and extended in about 1830. It is in stone with a tile roof, it has a long low front, and there are two levels. The barn contains four hay loft doors, seven entrances, and casement windows.	II
Lawn Farmhouse; 53.07727°N 2.09326°W	—	17th century	The farmhouse, which was extended in the 19th century, is partly in stone and partly in brick, with a tile roof that has verge parapets with pitched coping and flame finials. There are two storeys and an attic, and an L-shaped plan, consisting of an earlier projecting stone gabled wing to the left, and a later two-bay brick range to the right. The gabled wing is on a plinth, it has moulded string courses, and contains mullioned and transomed windows, and a porch with a blind oculus above it.	II
Meadow Cottage and Yewtree Cottage; 53.07639°N 2.09154°W	—	17th century	A farmhouse, later divided into two cottages, the building is in stone, with a tile roof that has verge parapets with pitched coping on corbelled kneelers. There are two storeys and attics, and four bays. In the centre of each cottage is a gabled porch, there are chamfered mullioned windows in the ground floor, and 20th-century casements elsewhere.	II
Barn north of Sutton House; 53.08175°N 2.10721°W	—	17th century	The barn, which was altered in the 19th century, is in stone and has a tile roof. There are two levels, consisting of a hay loft over a cow shed, and an L-shaped plan, with a front range of about 25 metres (82 ft) and a rear outshut. The openings include opposing doors, vents, and hay loft doors.	II
St Luke's Church; 53.08139°N 2.10870°W		17th century	The oldest part of the church is the tower, the rest of the church dating from 1876–79. It is built in sandstone and has roofs of red and blue tile and slate. The church consists of a nave, north and south aisles, a south porch, a chancel, and a west tower. The tower has three stages, a west door with a segmental head, a moulded string course, and an embattled parapet with crocketed angle pinnacles.	II
Cross base, St Luke's Church; 53.08130°N 2.10896°W	—	17th century (probable)	The cross base is in the churchyard of the church, and is in stone. It is circular at the bottom, and has a short square shaft about 1.2 metres (3 ft 11 in) high, which is chamfered at the angles, and run out at the head and the base.	II
Stable north of Sutton House; 53.08184°N 2.10744°W	—	17th century	The stable, which was partly rebuilt in the 19th century, is in stone, the gable at the east end has been rebuilt in brick, and the roof is tiled. There are two levels, with a loft over a stable. In the stable is an entrance with a Tudor arch, a doorway, and a two-light mullioned window, and in the loft are vents.	II
The Ashes; 53.08751°N 2.10349°W		17th century	The farmhouse was altered in the 18th century. It is in stone and has a tile roof with verge parapets and pitched copings. There are two storeys, an attic and cellars, and an H-shaped plan, consisting of a hall range and projecting gabled cross-wings. The left gable has a plinth and moulded string courses. The entrance is in the right wing, and has a Tuscan doorcase with a cornice and ball finials. The windows are mullioned or mullioned and transomed.	II*
Barn northeast of The Ashes; 53.08795°N 2.10304°W	—	17th century	The barn is in stone, with a tile roof that has verge parapets with pitched copings on corbelled kneelers. There are two levels, consisting of a hay loft over cow sheds. It has a long front, and contains seven hay loft doors, a segmental-headed cart entry, five doors, and top-hung casement windows.	II
Bull pen north of The Ashes; 53.08800°N 2.10326°W	—	17th century	The bull pen is in stone, with a tile roof that has verge parapets on corbelled kneelers. It has a single storey, it is gabled, and has a door in the centre of the south side.	II
Stable and cart shed east of The Ashes; 53.08758°N 2.10329°W	—	17th century	Possibly originally a barn, the building was converted in the 19th century. It is in stone with a stone slate roof that has verge parapets with pitched copings on corbelled kneelers. There are two levels, consisting of a loft over a stable and a cowshed. The stable is on the left and has a door, a small window, and a segmental arch. External steps in the left gable end lead up to the loft.	II
Hollinhurst Farmhouse; 53.07667°N 2.08166°W	—	1656	The farmhouse, which was altered in the 19th century, is in stone, and has a tile roof with verge parapets. There are two storeys, and an L-shaped plan, with a range of four bays, and a projecting gabled wing on the right. In the wing is a doorway with a heavy dated lintel. Most of the windows are 20th-century casements, and at the ends of the house are blind windows with chamfered mullions and hood moulds.	II
Clay Lake Farmhouse; 53.07724°N 2.12693°W	—	17th or early 18th century	The farmhouse was altered in the 19th and 20th centuries. It is in stone on a chamfered plinth, and has a tile roof with verge parapets and pitched copings. There are two storeys, a central gabled porch, and at the rear is a mullioned window.	II
Barn north of The Ashes; 53.08784°N 2.10343°W	—	17th or early 18th century	The barn is in stone and has a tile roof with verge parapets on corbelled kneelers. There are two levels, consisting of a hay loft over cowsheds. In the upper level are two hay loft doors and vents, and in the lower level are eight openings, including an entrance with a heavy lintel. At the rear is a Tudor arched doorway.	II
Owl Cottage; 53.08350°N 2.10518°W	—	1710	The lower part of the cottage is in stone, the upper part in brick, and the roof is tiled. There are two storeys and two bays. The central doorway has a dated and inscribed heavy lintel and a gabled hood, and the windows are 20th-century casements.	II
Cottage north of Sutton House; 53.08158°N 2.10748°W	—	Early 18th century	The cottage is in sandstone and has a tile roof with verge parapets. There is one storey and an attic, and a single bay. The doorway has a quoined surround, and the two-light windows have chamfered mullions.	II
Sherrat memorial 53.08130°N 2.10870°W	—	1734	The memorial is in the churchyard of St Luke's Church, and is to the memory of Simon Sherrat. It is a chest tomb in stone, and has a moulded plinth and cornice, tall sides, and an apsidal end to the west.	II
Group of three chest tombs 53.08148°N 2.10872°W	—	18th century	The chest tombs are in the churchyard of St Luke's Church. They are in stone, and have varying designs.	II
Bridge No. 31 (Park Lane Bridge); 53.07996°N 2.10079°W		Late 18th century	The bridge carries Park Lane over the Caldon Canal. It is in stone, and consists of a single elliptical arch. The bridge has a raised string course, parapets with rounded coping cambered over the span, and piers at the ends.	II
Bridge No. 32 (Smith's Bridge); 53.08085°N 2.09727°W		Late 18th century	An accommodation bridge over the Caldon Canal, it is in stone, and consists of a single elliptical arch. The bridge has a raised string course, parapets with rounded coping cambered over the span, and piers set diagonally at the angles.	II
Bridge No. 33 (Brick Kiln Bridge); 53.08132°N 2.09216°W		Late 18th century	An accommodation bridge over the Caldon Canal, it is in stone, and consists of a single elliptical arch. The bridge has a raised string course, parapets with rounded coping cambered over the span, and piers at the ends.	II
Bridge No. 34 (Plant's Bridge); 53.08126°N 2.08480°W		Late 18th century	An accommodation bridge over the Caldon Canal, it is in stone, and consists of a single elliptical arch. The bridge has a raised string course, parapets with rounded coping cambered over the span, and with piers set diagonally.	II
Bridge No. 36; 53.08105°N 2.07896°W		Late 18th century	An accommodation bridge over the Caldon Canal, it is in stone, and consists of a single elliptical arch. The bridge has a raised string course, voussoirs, and parapets with coping. It is cambered over the north side, and there are piers set diagonally.	II
Lanehead Farmhouse; 53.09260°N 2.12912°W	—	Late 18th century	A stone farmhouse with a tile roof, two storeys and an attic, two bays, and a single-storey single-bay extension to the left. The windows are casements.	II
Lock No. 11; 53.08082°N 2.07738°W		c. 1779	Hazelhurst Middle Lock on the Caldon Canal, it was altered in 1841 and in about 1973, and is in red sandstone with some replacement in brick. There are two flights of stone steps and a bypass weir.	II
Evans memorial 53.08132°N 2.10857°W		1794	The memorial is in the churchyard of St Luke's Church, and is to the memory of Ann Evans. It is a chest tomb in stone on a plinth, and has inset pilasters at the angles with banded waists and heads, inscribed panels on the sides, and a moulded top slab.	II
Fox memorial 53.08110°N 2.10873°W	—	1796	The memorial is in the churchyard of St Luke's Church, and is to the memory of James Fox. It is a chest tomb in stone, and has moulded and waisted pilasters at the angles, a moulded top slab, and incised sides with quadrants at the angles.	II
Lock at entry to Leek Branch; 53.08109°N 2.07924°W		c. 1800	This is Hazelhurst Top Lock, Lock No. 10 on the Caldon Canal. It has stone-coped engineering brick retaining walls, and the lock gate, which dates from about 1981, has a wrought iron top rail.	II
Yates memorial 53.08156°N 2.10855°W	—	1817	The memorial is in the churchyard of St Luke's Church, and is to the memory of Samuel Yates. It is a chest tomb in stone on a deep moulded plinth, and has inclined side panels with scrolls at the angles, a pitched moulded top, and an inset centre slab.	II
Godwin memorial 53.08155°N 2.10871°W	—	1823	The memorial is in the churchyard of St Luke's Church, and is to the memory of Arthur Godwin. It is a chest tomb in stone on a deep moulded plinth, and has inclined sides with scrolls at the angles, a moulded cornice and a hipped inset centre slab.	II
1–5 Gratton Lane and wall 53.08405°N 2.10530°W	—	Early 19th century	A terrace of five cottages with a moulded eaves band, and a tile roof with verge parapets. There are two storeys and six bays. The windows are sashes with wedge lintels, some painted. In front of the cottages is a stone stepped plinth wall with cast iron spearhead railings.	II
Bridge No. 1; 53.08085°N 2.07919°W		Early 19th century	An accommodation bridge over the Leek Branch of the Caldon Canal, it is in red brick, and consists of a single elliptical arch. The bridge has stone copings, string courses, rubbing blocks, parapets cambered over the span, and end piers set diagonally.	II
Bridge No. 27; 53.07178°N 2.11321°W		Early 19th century	A roving bridge over the Caldon Canal, it is in painted brick and consists of a single elliptical arch. The bridge has stone copings, a hood mould, and a cambered parapet with end piers.	II
Bridge No. 29 (Kidd's Bridge); 53.07467°N 2.10232°W		Early 19th century	An accommodation bridge over the Caldon Canal, it is in brick and consists of a single elliptical arch. The bridge has a string course, a parapet cambered over the span, and diagonal end piers with stone cappings.	II
Lock Keeper's Cottage; 53.08118°N 2.07926°W		Early 19th century	The cottage is adjacent to Hazelhurst Top Lock. It is in rendered brick and has a blue tile roof. There are two storeys and an L-shaped plan, with two bays, the left bay protruding and gabled. On the gable end is a hipped bay window, and the other windows are mullioned with two lights.	II
The Plough Inn; 53.07885°N 2.10861°W		Early 19th century	The public hours is in red brick, partly rendered, with stone dressings, on a plinth, with quoins and a hipped tile roof. There are two storeys and three bays. On the front are three semicircular two-storey bay windows with cornices, containing sash windows with columns between. Steps lead up to the doorway that has a raised surround and a pediment.	II
Canal lock side pond 53.08102°N 2.07927°W	—	c. 1842	A basin in stone and semi-engineering brick, it is square with sides of about 4 metres (13 ft) and curved corners. On the north side is a balustrade of wrought iron railings.	II
Footbridge at SJ 947 537; 53.08113°N 2.07957°W		1842	A roving bridge near Hazelhurst Top Lock, it is Bridge No. 35 over the Caldon Canal, and is in cast iron with abutments in stone. The bridge consists of a single elliptical arch that has a balustrade screen with a fish-scale pattern, and a dated centre panel.	II
Spring house 53.08373°N 2.10528°W	—	1845	The structure surrounds the outlet of a spring and is in stone. It consists of a square basin surrounded on three sides, and with a dated Tudor arched head. Above this is a cornice, and a stepped pyramidal roof surmounted by a wrought iron weathervane.	II
Milepost outside Kings Croft; 53.07806°N 2.11906°W		1879	The milepost is on the side of the B5051 road. It is in cast iron, and consists of a circular shaft with a domed head carrying two plates inscribed with the distances to Leek and Newcastle-under-Lyme.	II
Milepost at SJ 923 528; 53.07304°N 2.11559°W		1879	The milepost in on the northwest side of Leek Road (A53 road). It is in cast iron, and consists of a circular shaft with a domed head carrying two plates inscribed with the distances to Leek, Newcastle-under-Lyme, and Burslem. On the base of the shaft is a quatrefoil panel with the date and details of the manufacturer.	II
Milepost at SJ 933 541; 53.08397°N 2.10077°W		1879	The milepost in on the northwest side of Leek Road (A53 road). It is in cast iron, and consists of a circular shaft with a domed head carrying two plates inscribed with the distances to Leek, Newcastle-under-Lyme, and Burslem. On the base of the shaft is a quatrefoil panel with the date and details of the manufacturer.	II
