= Free verse =

Poetic style

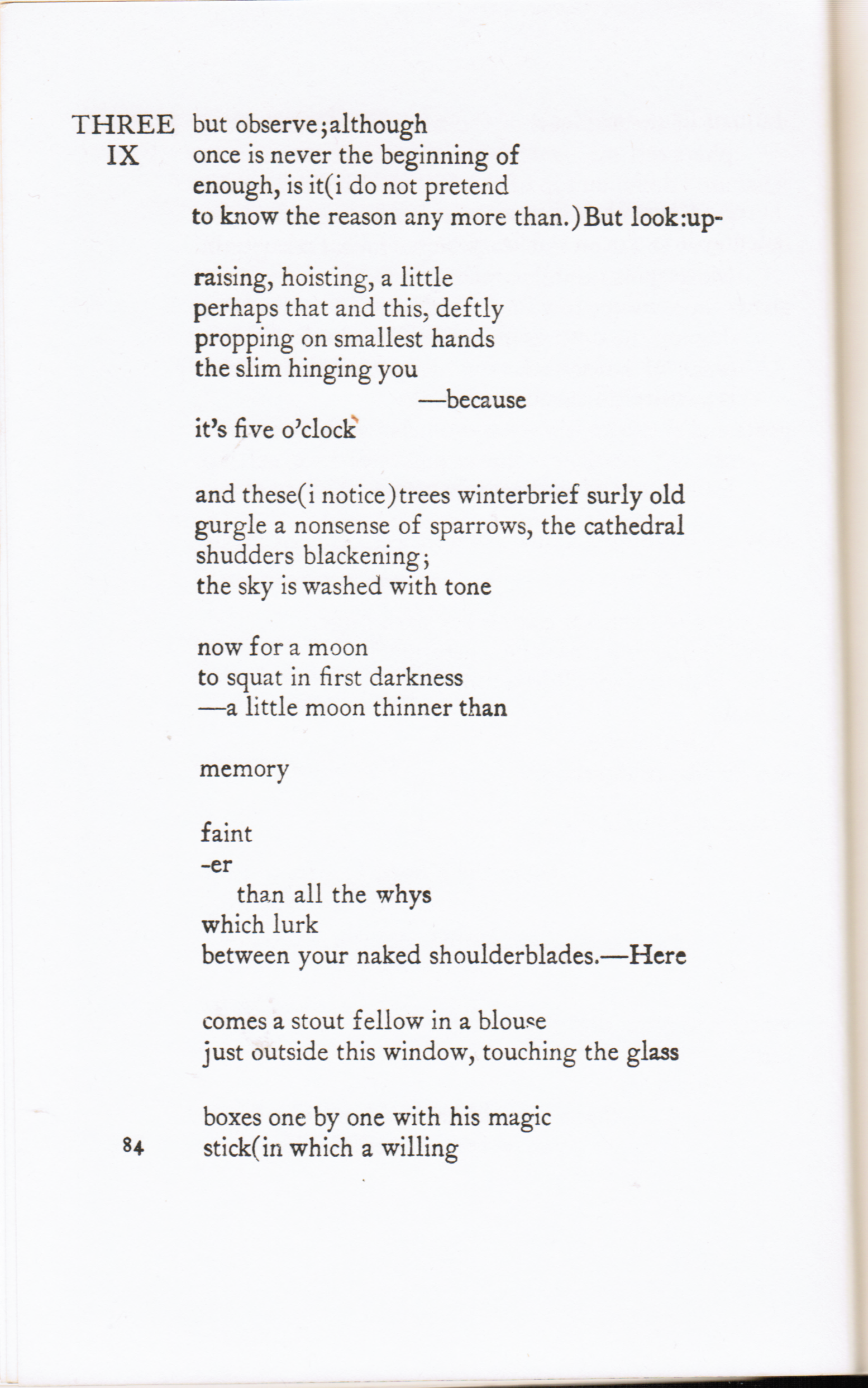
"Is 5" by E. E. Cummings, an example of free verse.

Free verse is an open form of poetry which does not use a prescribed or regular meter or rhyme and tends to follow the rhythm of natural or irregular speech. It encompasses a large range of poetic form, and its distinction to other forms (such as prose) is often ambiguous. In general, the core characteristic of free verse is its flexibility.

== History ==
Though individual examples of English free verse poetry surfaced before the 20th century (parts of John Milton's Samson Agonistes or the majority of Walt Whitman's poetry, for example), free verse is generally considered an early 20th century innovation of the late 19th-century French vers libre. However, the sort of cadencing now recognized in free verse can be traced back at least as far as the archaic "Hebrew psalmist" poetry of the Bible. The title of "American father of free verse" has been bestowed upon Walt Whitman.

T. E. Hulme and F. S. Flint first introduced the form to the London-based Poets' Club in 1909. This form later became the heart of the Imagist movement through Flint's advocacy of the genre. Imagism, in the wake of French Symbolism (i.e. vers libre of French Symbolist poets), was the wellspring out of which the main current of Modernism in English flowed. T. S. Eliot later identified this as "the point de repere usually taken as the starting point of modern poetry," since hundreds of poets were led to adopt vers libre as their medium.

In the 21st century, most published poems are considered to be free verse. Free verse is one of the more popular forms of poetry today and is considered the "norm."

== Definition ==
Verse is free "when it is not primarily obtained by the metered line." Free verse does not have "predetermined patterns that define many other poetic forms," but it is not considered to be completely free. In 1948, Charles Allen wrote, "The only freedom cadenced verse obtains is a limited freedom from the tight demands of the metered line." Free verse is as equally subject to elements of form (the poetic line, rhythm, strophes or strophic rhythms, stanzaic patterns, and rhythmic units or cadences) as other forms of poetry. Donald Hall goes as far as to say that "the form of free verse is as binding and as liberating as the form of a rondeau," and T. S. Eliot wrote, "No verse is free for the man who wants to do a good job."

Kenneth Allott, the poet and critic, said the adoption by some poets of vers libre arose from "mere desire for novelty, the imitation of Whitman, the study of Jacobean dramatic blank verse, and the awareness of what French poets had already done to the alexandrine in France." The American critic John Livingston Lowes in 1916 observed "Free verse may be written as very beautiful prose; prose may be written as very beautiful free verse. Which is which?"

Some poets have considered free verse restrictive in its own way. In 1922, Robert Bridges voiced his reservations in the essay "Humdrum and Harum-Scarum". Robert Frost, in a comment regarding Carl Sandburg, later remarked that "Writing free verse is like playing tennis with the net down." Sandburg responded saying, in part, "There have been poets who could and did play more than one game of tennis with unseen rackets, volleying airy and fantastic balls over an insubstantial net, on a frail moonlight fabric of a court." William Carlos Williams said, "Being an art form, a verse cannot be free in the sense of having no limitations or guiding principles." Yvor Winters, the poet and critic, said, "…the greatest fluidity of statement is possible where the greatest clarity of form prevails. … The free verse that is really verse—the best that is, of W.C. Williams, H. D., Marianne Moore, Wallace Stevens, and Ezra Pound—is, in its peculiar fashion, the antithesis of free."

In Welsh poetry, however, the term has a completely different meaning. According to Jan Morris, "When Welsh poets speak of Free Verse, they mean forms like the sonnet or the ode, which obey the same rules as English poesy. Strict Metres verse still honors the immensely complex rules laid down for correct poetic composition 600 years ago."

In general, there seems to be disagreement on whether free verse is restricted by foundational poetry conventions or not.

== Vers libre ==
Vers libre is a free-verse poetic form of flexibility, complexity, and naturalness created in France in 1886. It was largely through the activities of La Vogue, a weekly journal founded by Gustave Kahn, as well as the appearance of a band of poets unequaled at any one time in the history of French poetry. Their style of poetry was dubbed "Counter-Romanticism" and it was led by Verlaine, Rimbaud, Mallarmé, Laforgue, and Corbière. It is concerned with synesthesia (the harmony or equilibrium of sensation) and later described as "the moment when French poetry began to take consciousness of itself as poetry." Gustave Kahn was commonly supposed to have invented the term vers libre and according to F. S. Flint, he "was undoubtedly the first theorist of the technique(s)." Later in 1912, Robert de Souza published his conclusion on the genre, voicing that "A vers libre was possible which would keep all the essential characteristics of vers Classique, but would free it from the encumbrances which usage had made appear indispensable." Thus, the practice of vers libre is not the abandoning of pattern, but the creation of an original and complicated metrical form for each poem.

The formal stimuli for vers libre were vers libéré (French verse of the late 19th century that liberated itself from classical rules of versification whilst observing the principle of isosyllabism and regular patterned rhyme) and vers libre Classique (a minor French genre of the 17th and 18th century which conformed to classic concepts, but in which lines of different length were irregularly and unpredictably combined) and vers Populaire (versification derived from oral aspects of popular song). Remy de Gourmont's Livre des Masques gave definition to the whole vers libre movement; he noted that there should arise, at regular intervals, a full and complete line, which reassures the ear and guides the rhythm.

=== Form and structure ===
The unit of vers libre is not the foot, the number of the syllables, the quantity, or the line. The unit is the strophe, which may be the whole poem or only a part. Each strophe is a complete circle. Vers libre is "verse-formal based upon cadence that allows the lines to flow as they will when read aloud by an intelligent reader."

Unrhymed cadence in vers libre is built upon "organic rhythm" or the rhythm of the speaking voice with its necessity for breathing, rather than upon a strict metrical system. Vers libre addresses the ear, not the eye. Vers libre is liberated from traditional rules concerning meter, caesura, and line end stopping. Every syllable pronounced is of nearly equal value but is less strongly accented than in English; being less intense requires less discipline to mold the accents into the poem's rhythm. This new technique, as defined by Kahn, consists of the denial of a regular number of syllables as the basis for versification; the length of the line is long and short, oscillating with images used by the poet following the contours of his or her thoughts and is free rather than regular.

Although free verse requires no meter, rhyme, or other traditional poetic techniques, a poet can still use them to create some sense of structure. A clear example of this can be found in Walt Whitman's poems, where he repeats certain phrases and uses commas to create both a rhythm and structure.

Pattern and discipline are to be found in good free verse; the internal pattern of sounds, the choice of exact words, and the effect of associations give free verse its beauty. With the Imagists, free verse became a discipline and acquired status as a legitimate poetic form. Herbert Read, however, noted that "the Imagist Ezra Pound gave free verse its musical structure to an extent that paradoxically it was no longer free."

Unrestrained by traditional boundaries, the poet possesses more license to express and has more control over the development of the poem; This can allow for a more spontaneous and individualized poetic art product.

Technically, free verse has been described as spaced prose, a mosaic of verse and prose experience.

== Antecedents ==
As the French-language term vers libre suggests, this technique of using more irregular cadences is often said to have its origin in the practices of 19th-century French poets such as Gustave Kahn and Jules Laforgue, in his Derniers vers of 1890. Taupin, the US-based French poet and critic, concluded that free verse and vers libre are not synonymous, since "the French language tends to give equal weight to each spoken syllable, whereas English syllables vary in quantity according to whether stressed or unstressed."

Walt Whitman, who based his long lines in his poetry collection Leaves of Grass on the phrasing of the King James Bible, influenced later American free verse composers, notably Allen Ginsberg. One form of free verse was employed by Christopher Smart in his long poem Jubilate Agno (Latin: Rejoice in the Lamb), "written during confinement in various asylums between 1758/1763 but not published until 1939."

Some poets of the Victorian era experimented with free verse. Christina Rossetti wrote examples of rhymed but unmetered verse, and poems such as W. E. Henley's "Discharged" (from his In Hospital sequence) could be considered free verse.

Free verse in English was persuasively advocated by critic T. E. Hulme in his A Lecture on Modern Poetry (1908). Later in the preface to Some Imagist Poets 1916, he commented, "Only the name is new, you will find something much like vers libre in Dryden's Threnodia Augustalis; a great deal of Milton's Samson Agonistes, and the oldest in Chaucer's House of Fame."

In France, a few pieces in Arthur Rimbaud's prose poem collection Illuminations contains free verse, and in the Netherlands, tachtiger (i.e. a member of the 1880s generation of innovative poets) Frederik van Eeden employed the form at least once in his poem "Waterlelie" ("Water Lily").

The German poet Heinrich Heine made an important contribution to the development of free verse with 22 poems, written in two-poem cycles between 1825 and 1826, called Die Nordsee (The North Sea); These were first published in Buch der Lieder (Book of Songs) in 1827.

== Famous poets ==
- Audre Lorde
  - "Coal"
- Langston Hughes
  - "I, Too"
- Laura Gilpin
  - "Two-Headed Calf"
- Margaret Atwood
  - "This is a Photograph of Me"
- Mary Oliver
  - "Wild Geese"
- Stephen Crane
  - "In the Desert"
- T.S. Eliot
  - "Cousin Nancy"
- Walt Whitman
  - "I Hear America Singing"
- William Carlos Williams
  - "The Red Wheelbarrow"

== See also ==
- Abbaye de Créteil
- Blank verse
- Cadence
- Confessional poetry
- Imagism
- Modernist poetry
- New Formalism
- Poetry analysis
- Prose poetry
- Symbolism
