= Cadence (poetry) =

Rhythmic pattern of a verse

In poetry, cadence describes the fall in pitch of the intonation of the voice, and its modulated inflection with the rise and fall of its sound.

== Etymology ==
From Middle French cadence, and from Italian cadenza, and from Latin cadentia, with the meaning "to fall.""

== Cadence in poetry ==
In poetry cadence describes the rhythmic pacing of language to a resolution and was a new idea in 1915 used to describe the subtle rise and fall in the natural flow and pause of ordinary speech where the strong and weak beats of speech fall into a natural order restoring the audible quality to poetry as a spoken art. Cadence verse is non-syllabic resembling music rather than older metrical poetry with a rhythmic curve containing one or more stressed accents and roughly corresponding to the necessity of breathing, the cadence being more rapid and marked than in prose.

== Legacy ==
The idea that cadence should be substituted for metre was at the heart of the Imagist credo according to T. E. Hulme. Unrhymed cadence in Vers libre is built upon 'organic rhythm,' or the rhythm of the speaking voice with its necessity for breathing, rather than upon a strict metrical system. Cadence in free verse came to mean whatever the writer liked, some claiming verse and poetry had it, but prose did not, but for some it was synonymous with free verse, where each poet has to find the cadence within himself.

== See also ==
- Vers libre
- Free verse
- Cadence (music)
