= A Lecture on Modern Poetry =

Lecture by T. E. Hulme promoting free verse

"A Lecture on Modern Poetry" was a paper by T. E. Hulme which was read to the Poets' Club around the end of 1908. It is a concise statement of Hulme's influential advocacy of free verse. The lecture was not published during Hulme's lifetime.

The lecture commences with an apparent attack on the attitudes of some members of the Club, including its president Henry Simpson. Hulme writes: "I want to speak of verse in a plain way as I would of pigs: that is the only honest way. The President told us last week that poetry was akin to religion. It is nothing of the sort."

Hulme discusses how forms rise and fall, and proceeds to the topic of French vers libre, referring to Gustave Kahn's explanation of the technique: "It consisted in a denial of a regular number of syllables as the basis of versification. The length of the line is long and short, oscillating with the images used by the poet; it follows the contours of his thought and is free rather than regular."

Hulme concludes with a call to arms: "a shell is a very suitable covering for the egg at a certain period of its career, but very unsuitable at a later age. This seems to me to represent fairly well the state of verse at the present time. ... [it] has become alive, it has changed from the ancient art of chanting to the modern impressionist, but the mechanism of verse has remained the same. It can't go on doing so. I will conclude, ladies and gentlemen, by saying, the shell must be broken."

== Sources ==
- Patrick McGuinness (editor), T. E. Hulme: Selected Writings, Fyfield Books, Carcanet Press, 1998. ISBN 1-85754-362-9
