= Endon High School =

Location
- Leek Road; Endon; Staffordshire, ST9 9EE; England
- Coordinates: 53.0735°N 2.1166°W

Information
- Type: Academy
- Local authority: Staffordshire County Council
- Trust: Shaw Education Trust
- Department for Education URN: 148002 Tables
- Ofsted: Reports
- Headteacher: Andrew Skelding
- Gender: Coeducational
- Age: 11 to 16
- Enrolment: 701 as of January 2016
- Website: http://endon.staffs.sch.uk/

Endon High School is a coeducational secondary school located in Endon in the English county of Staffordshire.

Endon Hall Primary School and St Lukes CE Primary School in Endon act as the main feeder schools for Endon High School, as well as St Anne's CE Primary School in Brown Edge.

Previously a community school administered by Staffordshire County Council, in November 2020 Endon High School converted to academy status. The school is now sponsored by the Shaw Education Trust.

Endon High School offers GCSEs and BTECs as programmes of study for pupils.
