= Longsdon =

Village in Staffordshire, England

Coordinates: 53.0888°N 2.0614°W

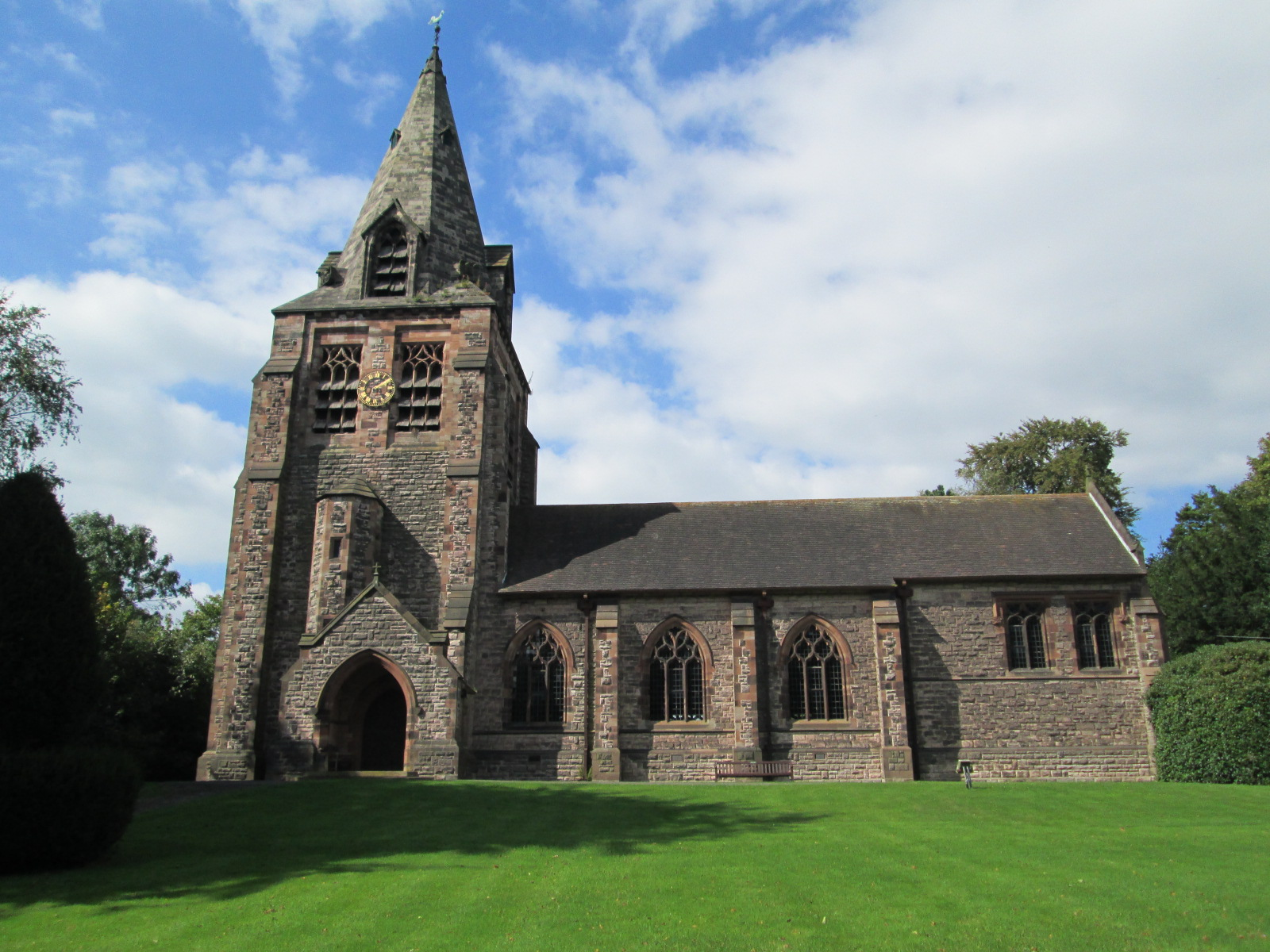
- St Chad's Church, Longsdon

- Location within Staffordshire
- OS grid reference: SJ 960 546
- Civil parish: Longsdon
- District: Staffordshire Moorlands
- Shire county: Staffordshire
- Region: West Midlands
- Country: England
- Sovereign state: United Kingdom
- Post town: Stoke-on-Trent
- Postcode district: ST9
- Police: Staffordshire
- Fire: Staffordshire
- Ambulance: West Midlands
- UK Parliament: Staffordshire Moorlands

Longsdon is a village and civil parish in the Staffordshire Moorlands district of Staffordshire, England, about 1.5 miles (2.4 km) southwest of Leek, on the A53 road.

== Civil parish ==
The civil parish was created in 1894. (Formerly Longsdon was part of a civil parish including Endon and Stanley.) The boundary partly follows Horton Brook in the west, Endon Brook in the south and, until 1934 when 560 acres (230 ha) were transferred to Leek Urban District, the River Churnet in the east. Several farmhouses lie in the north of the civil parish, south of Rudyard.

== Buildings ==
Longsdon Memorial Hall, south of the main road, dates from 1920, and was built as a memorial to the men of the village who died in the First World War.

Adjacent to the Memorial Hall is the pub The Wheel.

Dunwood Hall, in the west of the village and north of the main road, was built in 1871 for Thomas Hulme, a potter. It is a Grade II listed building. The architect was Robert Scrivener, and its style is regarded as High Gothic.

=== St Chad's Church ===
Villagers used to attend the church at Endon, built about 1720. In 1871 a mission church dedicated to St James, also used as a school, was opened in Longsdon, in School Lane. The site was given by John Robinson, of Westwood Hall in Leek. In 1889 the mission was transferred to the new parish of All Saints', Leek.

In 1901, John Robinson gave land in Longsdon, off the main road, as the site of a new church, adjoining a burial ground for which he had donated land in 1899.

The parish church of St Chad was built from 1903 to 1905. The architect was Gerald Horsley, and it is regarded as influenced by the work of Norman Shaw. It is a Grade II* listed building. The church is in perpendicular style; it has a west tower with a broach spire, and a south porch. The fittings are in Arts and Crafts style.

The parish was created in 1906. St Chad is now one of the churches in the United Benefice of Cheddleton, Horton, Longsdon and Rushton Spencer, of the Diocese of Lichfield.

== See also ==
- Listed buildings in Longsdon
