= Stanley, Staffordshire =

Village in Staffordshire, England

Coordinates: 53°4′6″N 2°6′12″W

Stanley
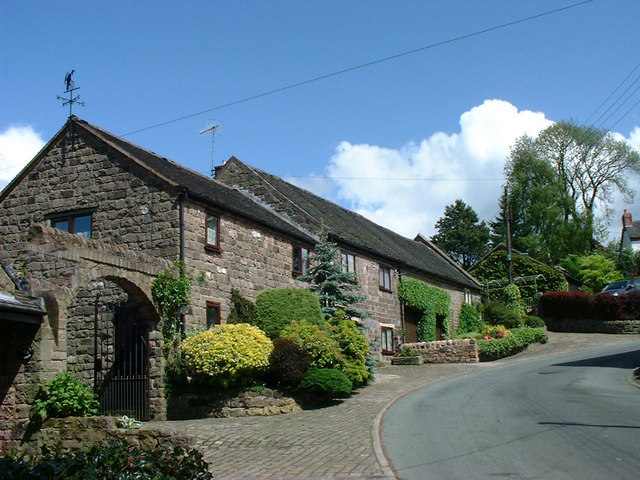
- Cottages in Stanley

- Location within Staffordshire
- OS grid reference: SJ 933 523
- Civil parish: Endon and Stanley
- District: Staffordshire Moorlands
- Shire county: Staffordshire
- Region: West Midlands
- Country: England
- Sovereign state: United Kingdom
- Police: Staffordshire
- Fire: Staffordshire
- Ambulance: West Midlands

Stanley is a small village in the Staffordshire Moorlands district of Staffordshire, England, about 4 miles (6.4 km) southwest of Leek. The village of Bagnall is about 1 mile (1.6 km) to the south.

Stanley was formerly a township in the parish of Leek, and later part of a civil parish with Endon (about 1 mile (1.6 km) to the north) and Longsdon (about 3 miles (4.8 km) to the north-east). Since 1894 it has been in the civil parish of Endon and Stanley.

The village lies mostly at height 500–600 feet (150–180 m). The name Stanley, probably referring to this site, means a clearing on stony ground. The terrain is of boulder clay, and the underlying rock is millstone grit.

== Features ==
Some cottages in Stanley were built in the 1860s for workers at flint mills, of which there were three in the 19th century. The pub The Travellers Rest dates from that time (its name being the original name).

Stanley Pool, south of the village, is used for sailing by the North Staffordshire Sailing Club, founded in 1961.

== History ==
The estate was held from about 1200 by William of Stanley, who received it from Adam de Audley, Lord of Horton; his descendants held the estate until 1660, when it was sold by William Stanley. The oldest house in the village, Lower House Farm, built about 1700, is probably on the site of the medieval manor house.

Stanley Pool was built in 1786 to supply the Caldon Canal. Originally 8 acres (3.2 ha), it was enlarged to 33 acres (13 ha) in 1840, a new dam being built to the north of the original dam.

== See also ==
- Listed buildings in Endon and Stanley
