= St Luke's Church, Endon =

Church of St Luke
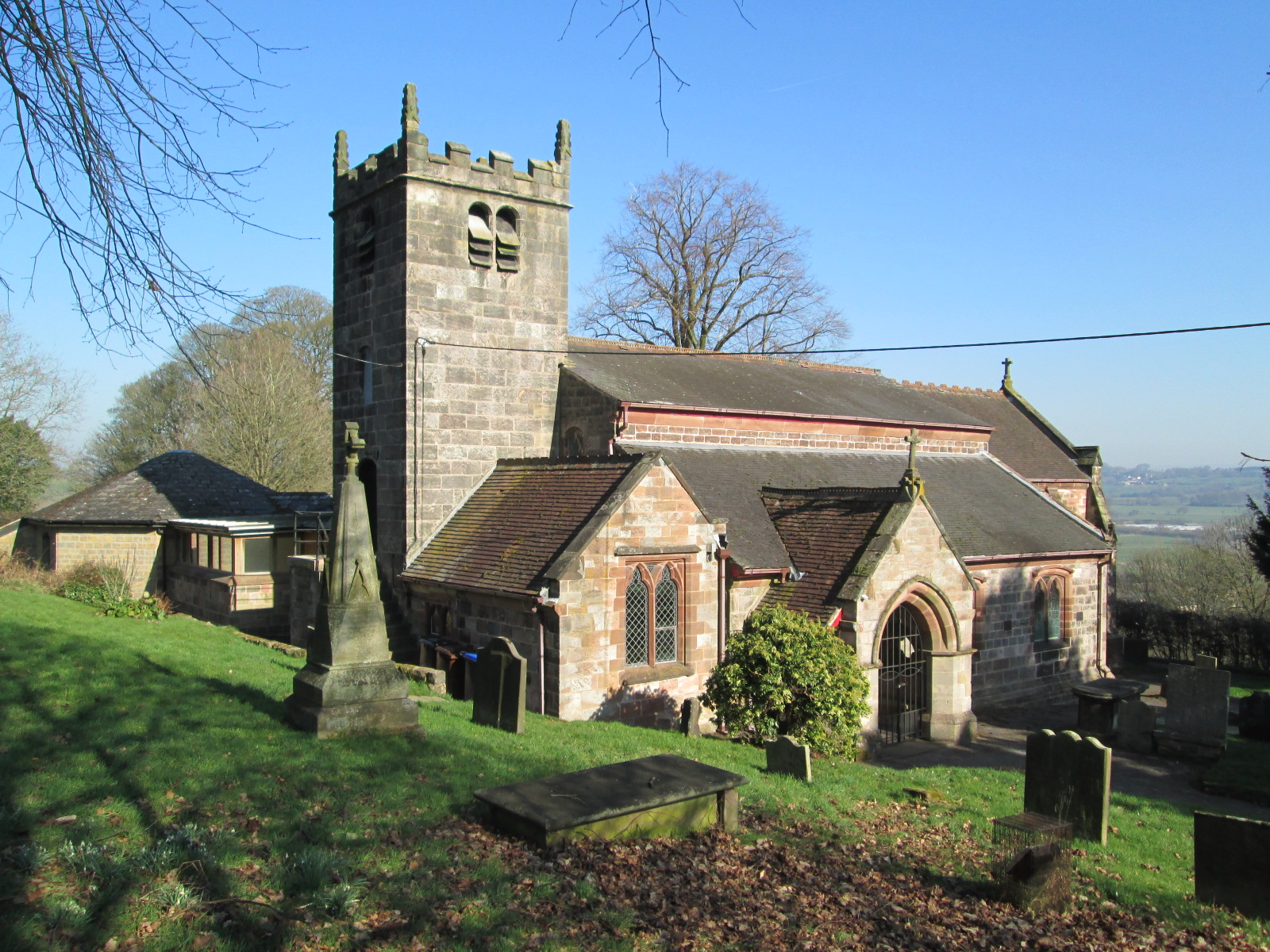
- Church of St Luke
- 53°4′52.954″N 2°6′31.529″W
- OS grid reference: SJ 92812 53800
- Location: Endon, Staffordshire
- Country: England
- Denomination: Church of England
- Website: endonstlukes.org.uk

Architecture
- Heritage designation: Grade II
- Designated: 15 December 1986

Administration
- Diocese: Lichfield

St Luke's Church is an Anglican church in Endon, Staffordshire, England, and in the Diocese of Lichfield. The building, dating originally from about 1720 and rebuilt in the 1870s, is Grade II listed.

== History and description ==
The original church was built in 1719–1721. It had a nave with a west tower, and two galleries, one of which was accessed from external stairs on the tower. It was a chapel of ease for the parish church of Leek, St Edward's; in 1865 the parish of Endon was created, which included Longsdon until 1889.

The church was rebuilt in the 1870s by Beardmore of Hanley, preserving the original tower and its external stairs. The chancel was extended and a south aisle of three bays was added. A stone pulpit was installed, and the box pews were removed. The floor of the nave was laid with tiles by Mintons. A north aisle, similar to the south aisle, was built in 1898. In the 1980s, the Chapter House, an octagonal meeting room, was built adjoining the church on the north-west.

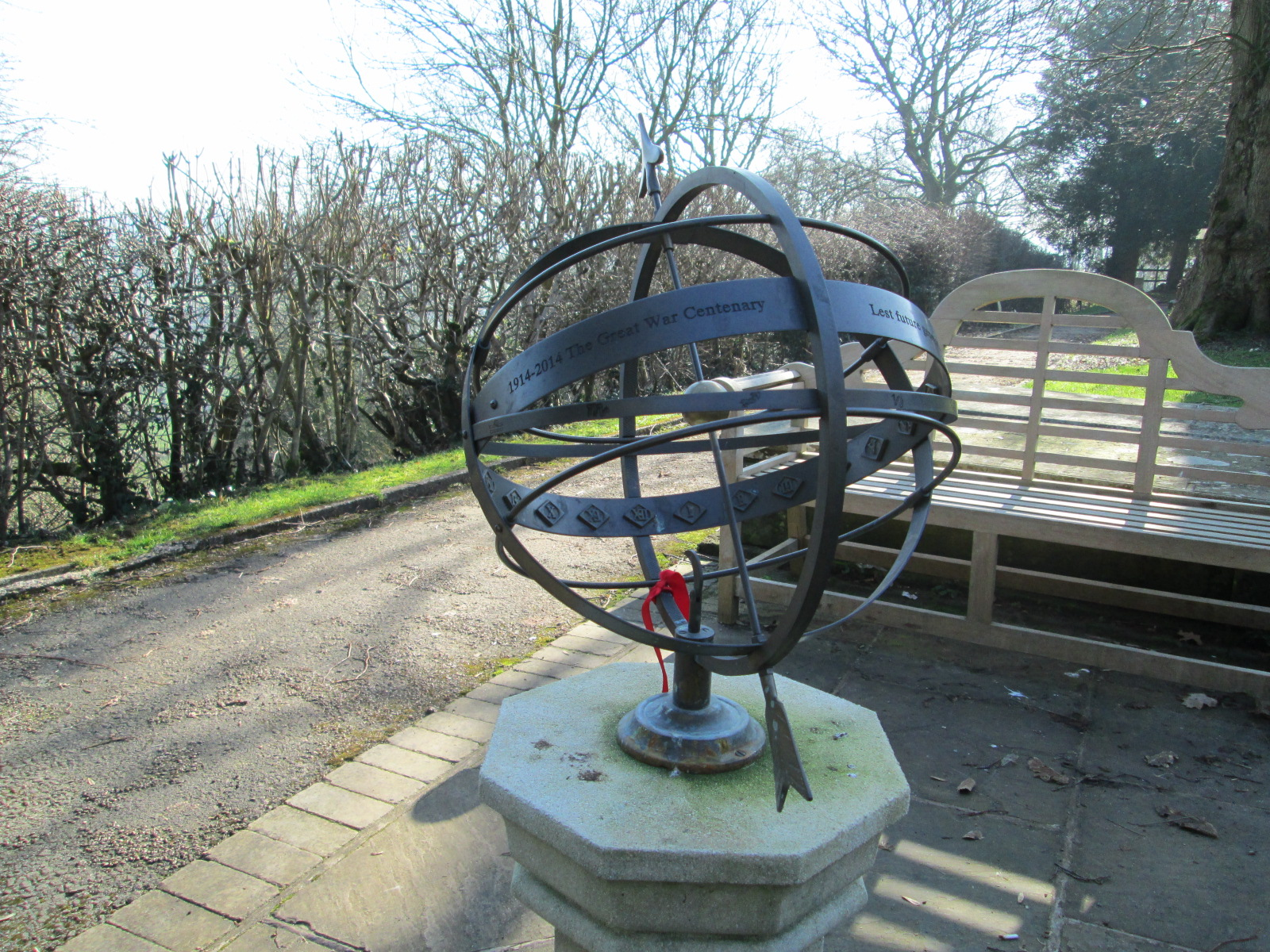
Sundial at St Luke's Church

The east window, installed in 1893, is by Edward Burne-Jones; it is a memorial to George Smith of Bank House. Another window was given as a memorial to the writer T. E. Hulme, born in Endon, and killed in the Great War. There is a single bell, dated 1726.

In the grounds of the church is an armillary sundial, commissioned from Robert Foster of Ironbridge, commemorating the centenary in 2014 of the Great War.

== See also ==
- Listed buildings in Endon and Stanley
