= A Quinzaine for this Yule =

Collection of poetry by Ezra Pound

- Author: Ezra Pound
- Language: English
- Genre: Poetry collection
- Published: 1908 (Pollock and Co)
- Publication date: December 1908
- Publication place: Britain
- ISBN: 0879680873

A Quinzaine for this Yule (or A Quinzaine for this Yule: Being Selected from a Venetian Sketch-book "San Trovaso.") is a collection of poetry by Ezra Pound.

== Content ==
The title refers to an archaic word for the fifteenth day after a feast day, or a verse with fifteen syllables. Yule is a traditional word for a winter religious festival. The book is 27 pages long and contains 15 poems. It was published in 1908 by Pollock and Co.

== Background ==
When Pound was working on getting his first collection, A Lume Spento, published while in Venice, he kept a notebook commonly known as the San Trovaso notebook that contained drafts of poetry. When he returned to London towards the end of 1908, it was this notebook that he used as the basis of a new poetry collection. The book was, like his first, self-financed, though it was promoted out of the shop of Charles Elkin Mathews.

== Reception ==
Robert Stark notes that "he rejects many of the conventionally poetic qualities of his earliest verse" claiming that Pound attempted for a sort of "literary barbarianism". Contemporary reviews, such as in Punch, noted (referring collectively to A Quinzaine, A Lume Spento, Exultations, and Personae) that "[Pound's] verse is the most remarkable thing in poetry since Robert Browning".
