= Henry Simpson (Poets' Club founder) =

Henry Simpson, FRSL (22 October 1868 - 20 November 1960) was a banker and the founder and president of the Poets' Club in London in 1908.

== Early life and education ==
Simpson was born in Canonbury, London, son of Archibald Simpson, a doctor, and Agnes Simpson (née Forbes). Simpson's mother was descended from the Lord Forbes of Pitsligo. His Great Uncle was the Scottish architect Archibald Simpson. He was brought up in Aberdeen and educated at the Royal High School, Edinburgh.

== Career ==
Following school he joined the banking profession, where he spent four years with the Royal Bank of Scotland in Edinburgh. He then returned to London where he joined the Capital and Counties Bank and took up the role of bank manager in their Westminster branch.

In March 1908 he played a chief role in the founding of the Poets Club and was the club's first president. The first meeting consisted of a group of nine men and women who met at a Bohemian restaurant in Soho, all were poetry enthusiasts who wished to recite their works in public. The club was the first literary club to allow women as members. The club published a number of poetry anthologies which included Simpson's own poems alongside other poets including Ezra Pound and T. E. Hulme.

Simpsons' poems were published in newspapers and literary reviews around the world. He published three books of verse, the first was A Faery Flute which was published in 1909 which was described by the Aberdeen Daily Journal as being "full of fine thoughts and beautiful imagery, couched in choice language and in melodious rhythms." A second book of verse, The Golden Rose and Other Poems, was published in 1917 and influenced by the war: the Illustrated London News review stated that "[t]he author is one of those to whom the thought of war gives pain". and The Gentlewoman's review, that "his efforts breathe the true poetic spirit, and are pregnant with high-minded patriotism." Simpson's final book of verse, Lauds and Loves, was published in 1930 with a preface by his friend, the writer Gilbert Frankau.

Simpson was for many years a Fellow of the Royal Society of Literature and was awarded a Lifetime Fellowship for "services to poetry and letters". He was also a member of the Society's council for ten years and held the role of honorary treasurer.

Simpson, aged 90, was still president of the club when it celebrated its 50th anniversary in 1958. He died two years later in November 1960. He was married and had three children.

== Sources ==
- Jewel Spears Brooker, Mastery and Escape: T.S. Eliot and the Dialectic of Modernism, University of Massachusetts Press, 1996, ISBN 1-55849-040-X. (page 48)
- The papers of Oscar Browning
