= The Ashes, Endon =

Coordinates: 53.0875°N 2.1035°W

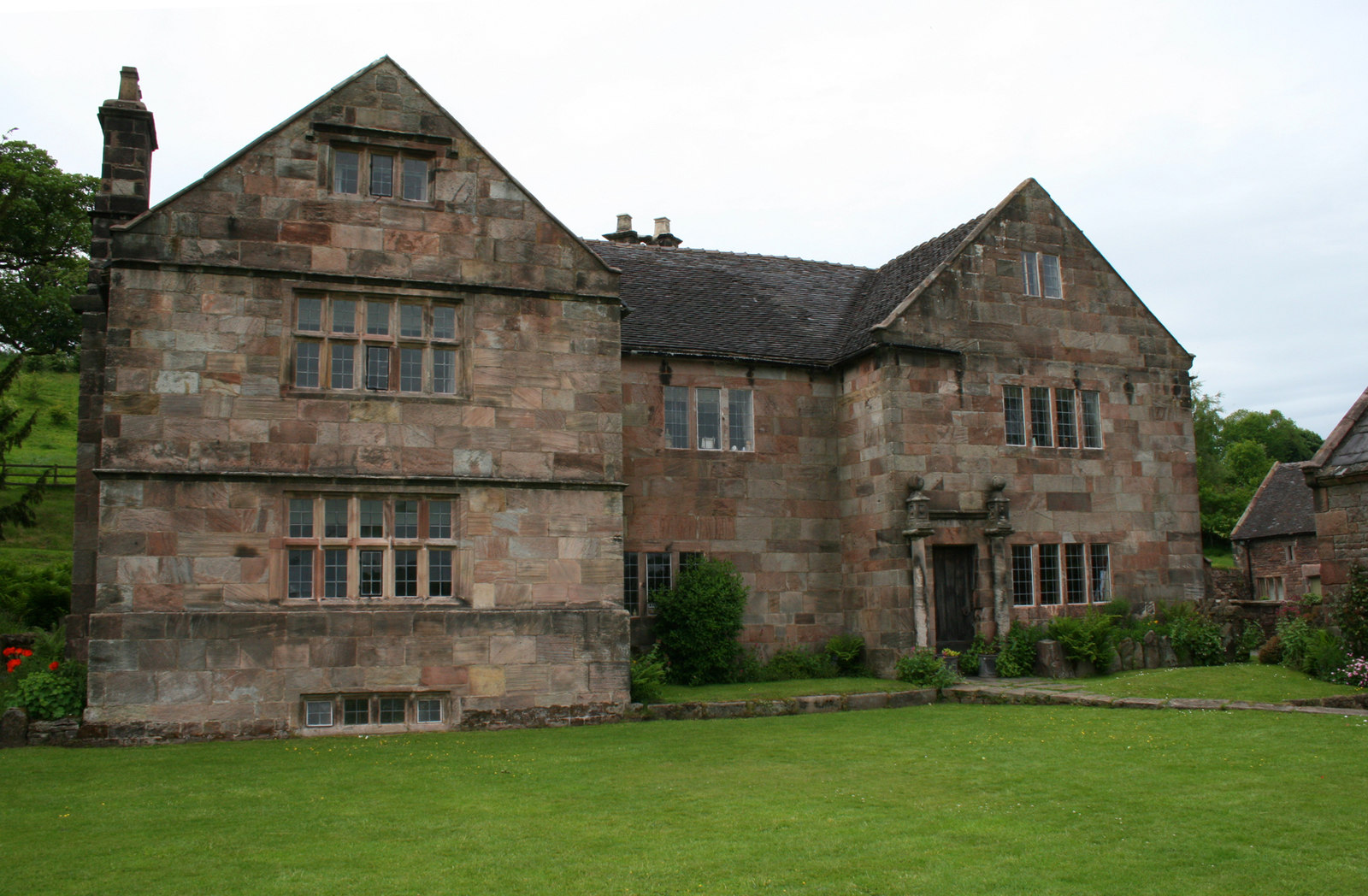
The Ashes

The Ashes near Endon in Staffordshire is a building of historical significance and is Grade II* listed on the English Heritage Register. It was built in the 17th century probably by Sir John Bellot and was the home of many notable residents for the next three centuries. Today the barns of the property are venues for weddings and other special events.

== Early owners ==
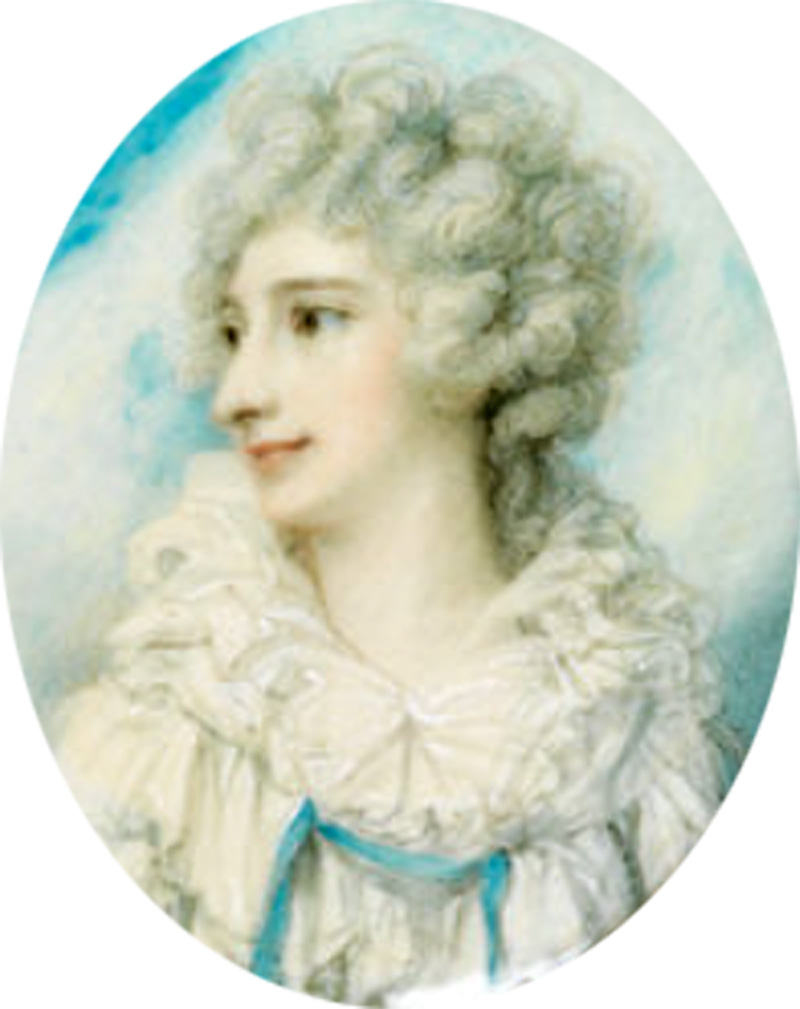
Jane Debank who married William Sneyd

Before the Dissolution of the Monasteries in 1538 "The Ashes" paid its tithes to the Cistercian monks at Dieulacres Abbey. In 1561 Hugh Bentley bought the property with his wife Margaret. When he died his son John Bentley inherited the house. He and his wife Ellen Bowyer had only one child Ursula who was his sole heir. In 1612 she married John Bellot (1592-1659) of Moreton and so when John Bentley died in 1638 "The Ashes" was passed into the Bellot family. On John's death in 1659 his son Sir John Bellot (1619-1674) became the owner. It is believed that either he or his father is the builder of the current house.

Sir John Bellot was born in 1619. In about 1650 he married Anne Willbraham (1627-1711), daughter of Roger Wilbraham of Dorfold. When he died in 1674 his son Sir Thomas Bellot (1651-1699) inherited the property. Sir Thomas was a Member of Parliament and for many years represented the people of Newcastle-under-Lyme. He was educated at the University of Oxford and became a barrister. In 1675 he married Susanna Packe and the couple had two sons and three daughters. Their eldest son Sir John Bellot (1676-1714) became the owner in 1699 when Sir Thomas died. However in 1710 he sold the property to John Debank of Wall Grange.

John Debank married in 1721 Jane Wade. Their eldest son Simon Debank (1730-1801) became the owner of "The Ashes" when John died. He married Elizabeth Birtles (1750-1814) in 1771. The notice of marriage read: "On Monday last at Leek, Symon Debank Esq was married to Miss Birtles, an accomplished young lady with a fortune of £50,000 (About £7,300,000 today). The couple lived at "the Ashes" and had one child Jane Debank whose portrait is shown. An article about her life and marriage was in the book called "Staffordshire Women".

== Later owners ==
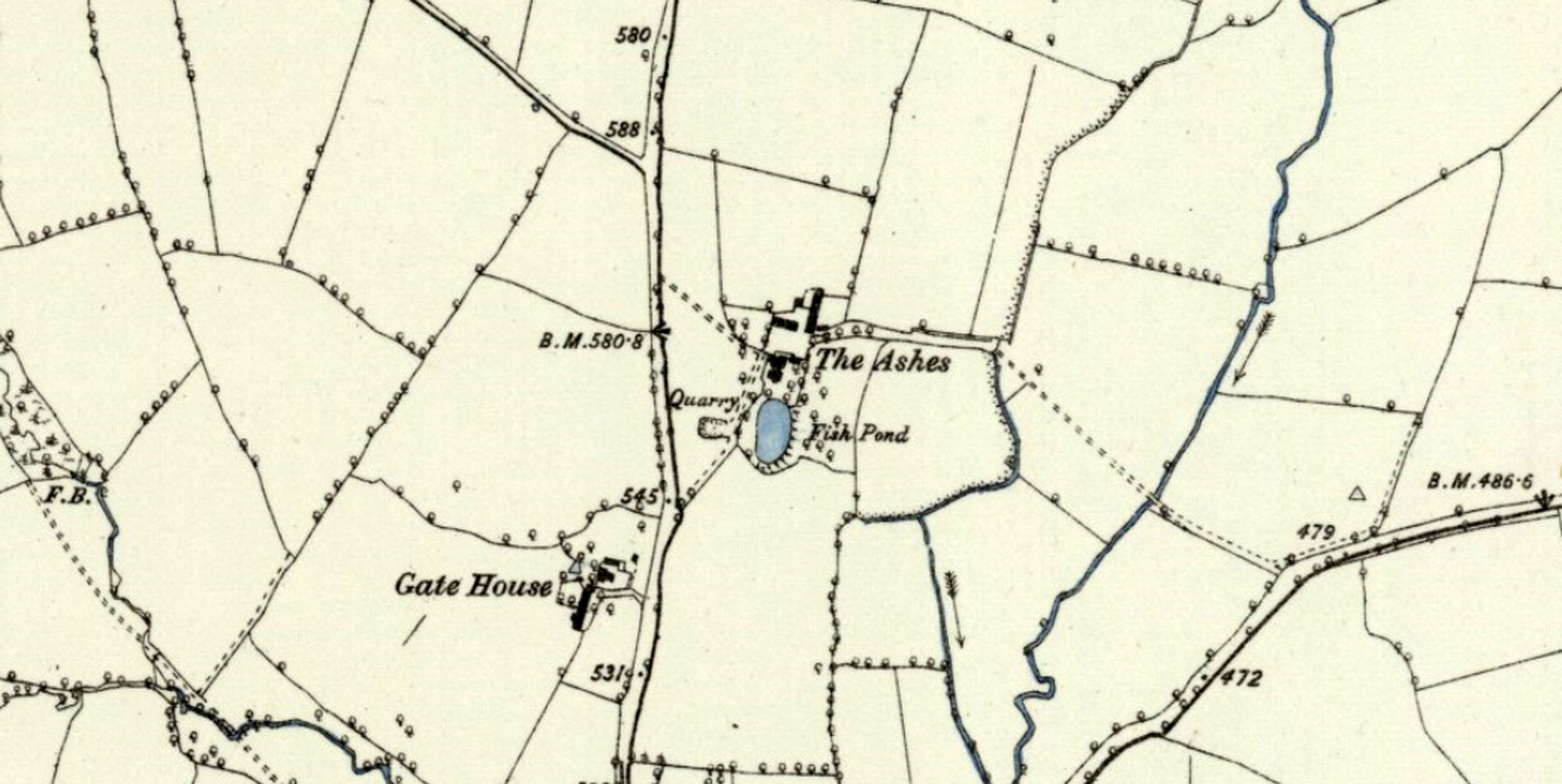
Map of The Ashes 1876

Jane Debank (1773-1840) married William Sneyd (1767-1851) in 1796 and "The Ashes" was passed to the Sneyd family with her large inheritance. This couple built Ashcombe Park which still stands today. Their fourth son Thomas Sneyd (1800-1882) inherited "The Ashes" in 1851 and after his death in 1882 his son Major General Thomas William Sneyd (1837-1918) became the owner. In about 1900 he decided to sell the property and it was bought by the Williamson family.

George Henry Williamson (1877-1967) was a horse breeder and farmer. He was born in 1877 in Cheddleton. His father was John Williamson of Hazelhurst, Cheddleton. In 1902 he married Charlotte Adams (1879-1955) who was the daughter of George Henry Adams of Endon. The couple had four children Eric Hazelhurst Williamson (1903-1992), George Henry Williamson (1905-1984), Evelyn Bessie Williamson (1909-2004) and John Myott Williamson (1911-1995). The three boys eventually left "The Ashes" but Evelyn Bessie (called Bessie) stayed there for the whole of her life and died there in 2004 at the age of 95.
