= Albert Durrant Watson =

Canadian poet, and physician

Albert D. Watson
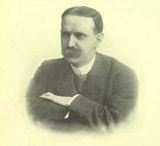
- Born: January 8, 1859; Dixie, Canada West
- Died: May 3, 1926 (aged 67); Toronto, Ontario
- Education: Victoria University; Edinburgh University
- Occupations: Physician, poet

Albert Durrant Watson (January 8, 1859 – May 3, 1926) was a Canadian poet, and physician.

== Life ==
He graduated from Victoria University, and Edinburgh University. He practiced medicine for more than forty years in the city of Toronto.

Watson was born in a family of a reformer in politics and a Methodist in religion. He held a series of seances from 1918 to 1920 by medium Louis Benjamin. He joined the Bahá'í Faith in 1920, was active in the Toronto community, and publishing poems related to the religion in the 1920s in and beyond Bahá'í publications.

The earliest known published assertion that we are stardust ("our bodies are star-stuff") is in Watson's 1913 book.

== Works ==
- "The Norse Discovery of America", Journal of the Royal Astronomical Society of Canada, 1923, v17, pp257.

=== Poetry ===
- "A Hymn for Canada", Canadian Medical Association Journal
- The wing of the wild bird and other poems. William Briggs. 1908. "Albert Durrant Watson."
- Love and the universe: The immortals, and other poems... Macmillan. 1913. ISBN 9780665776694.
- Heart Of The Hills: Poems. 1917. reprint. Kessinger Publishing, LLC. 2007. ISBN 978-0-548-73411-7.
- Dream of God: A Poem (1922)
- Woman: a poem. Ryerson Press. 1923.
- Poetical works. Ryerson Press. 1924.

=== Anthologies ===
- Bliss Carman; Lorne Pierce, eds. (1954). Canadian poetry in English. Ryerson Press.
- Albert Durrant Watson; Lorne Pierce, eds. (1923). Our Canadian literature: representative prose & verse. Ryerson Press.

=== Psychic ===
- The twentieth plane: a psychic revelation reported by Albert Durrant Watson. G. W. Jacobs & company. 1919. "Albert Durrant Watson."
- Albert Durrant Watson, Louis Benjamin (1920). Birth through death, the ethics of the twentieth plane: a revelation received through the psychic consciousness of Louis Benjamin. The James A. McCann company. "Albert Durrant Watson."
- Dr. Albert Durrant Watson, a prominent Canadian psychic investigator, claimed to be the first to receive a message from Dr. James H. Hyslop who died on June 17, 1920, in Upper Montclaire, New Jersey, "Hyslop's Society Scooped By Canada" The New York Times, Tuesday, June 22, 1920.
