= A Lume Spento =

1908 poetry collection by Ezra Pound

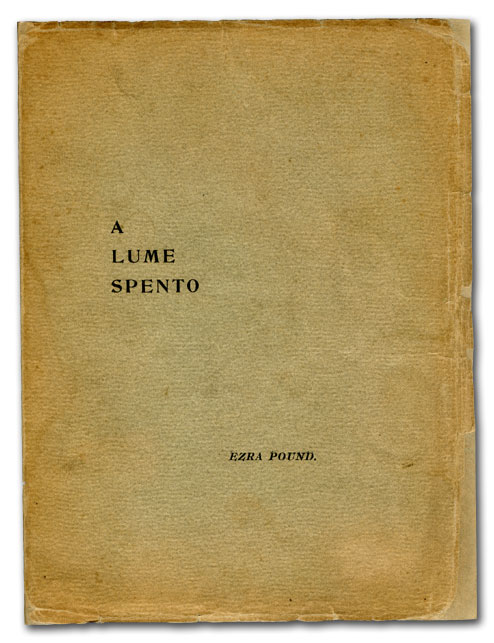
- Cover, first printing
- Author: Ezra Pound
- Language: English
- Genre: Poetry collection
- Publisher: A. Antonini
- Publication date: July 1908
- Publication place: Italy
- Media type: Print (softcover)

A Lume Spento (translated by the author as With Tapers Quenched) is a 1908 poetry collection by Ezra Pound. Self-published in Venice, it was his first collection.

== Background and writing ==
Ezra Pound (1885–1972) studied Romance languages and literature, including French, Italian, Provençal and Spanish, at the University of Pennsylvania and Hamilton College. In these studies Pound—long interested in poetry—had gained an interest in turn-of-the-century English poetry.

Pound dedicated A Lume Spento to Philadelphia artist William Brooke Smith, one of his friends, who had recently died of tuberculosis. The two had met in 1901–02, and Smith—an avid reader—introduced Pound to the works of English decadents such as Oscar Wilde and Aubrey Beardsley. The title of the work is an allusion to the third canto of Dante's Purgatory, where it occurs in the speech of Manfred, King of Sicily, as he describes the treatment his excommunicated corpse has endured, exhumed, and discarded without light along the banks of the river Verde. The procession of priests with unlit tapers is similar to the imagery in the practice of "bell, book and candle", but Manfred remains optimistic that "by their curse we are not so destroy'd, / But that the eternal love may turn, while hope / Retains her verdant blossom...". Critic Hugh Witemeyer wrote that, overall, the implication is that Smith had led an unorthodox life like that of Manfred.

The collection was initially meant to be titled La Fraisne ("The Ash Tree"). Although this title was not kept, the poem of the same name was presented second in the collection.

== Contents and themes ==
A Lume Spento consists of 45 poems.

A Lume Spento is replete with allusions to works which had influenced Pound, including Provençal and late Victorian literatures. Pound adopts Robert Browning's technique of dramatic monologues, and as such he "appears to speak in the voices of historical or legendary figures". These figures, Witemeyer writes, reflect the spiritualism common in the period, in which the different personae Pound adapts are considered "mediumistic channelings" of the deceased.

In his biography of Pound, David A. Moody argues that the collection demonstrated an implicit challenge to the "crepuscular spirit" prevalent in contemporary literature, one which has drawn little attention yet can be found in certain poems and the collection's arrangement. He notes a progression in which persons who let their passion get the best of them are, implicitly, relegated to a Dantean Hell. In two of the poems ("Famam Librosque Cano" and "Scriptor Ignotus"), he writes, Pound appears to be questioning his own poetry, yet also showing unbound pride at his ability. This last poem, according to Moody, is the culmination of this progression and challenge: "If 'La Fraisne' represented the lowest state of being, then in 'Scriptor Ignotus' we have the poet himself as aspiring to the most exalted state of his poetic soul".

== Release and reception ==
After completing the poems, Pound attempted to find an American company to publish them. He thought that it would impress publisher Thomas Bird Mosher, but was mistaken; Mosher refused to acknowledge the then-unknown poet. Unsuccessful with finding an American publisher, by February 1908 had left for Europe, first arriving in Gibraltar, then moving to Venice, Italy. It is in this latter city that Pound ultimately self-published A Lume Spento in July 1908, with the printer A. Antonini.

Upon arriving in Venice, Pound had only $80 to his name; $8 of this was spent printing A Lume Spento. Paper for this first printing was reportedly left over from the Venetian press's recent history of the church, and Pound supervised the printing process himself. Only 150 copies were printed. Pound was not confident of the quality of the work and considered dumping the proofs into a canal, later writing in Canto LXXVI:

shd/I chuck the lot into the tide-water?
Le Bozze "A Lume Spento"/
and by the column of Todero
shd/I shift to the other side.

In August, Pound moved to London, and by the end of the year he had persuaded the bookseller Elkin Mathews to display the collection. By October 1908, Pound's work had begun to receive critical commentary, both in the press and amongst the writing community. In a review of A Lume Spento, the London Evening Standard called it "wild and haunting stuff, absolutely poetic, original, imaginative, passionate, and spiritual". Later reception has been mixed. Moody writes that there is evidence of "some real mastery of rhythm and rhyme" in the work, but the quality of the poems drops dramatically as the collection continues.

Although Pound continued to seek an American publisher for A Lume Spento, he was unsuccessful. He published his second collection, A Quinzaine for this Yule, in December 1908. Pound's main poems from A Lume Spento were reprinted in his 1909 collection Personae; this collection begins with the same motto A Lume Spento ends, "Make strong old dreams lest this our world lose heart". Some more poems were included in later collections. A Lume Spento was first republished in full in 1965, as part of A Lume Spento and Other Early Poems, then again in 1976 as part of Collected Early Poems.

== Works cited ==
- Alighieri, Dante; Clay, Henry F. (trans) (1914). The Divine Comedy of Dante Alighieri: Hell, Purgatory, Paradise. The Harvard Classics. Vol. 20. New York: P.F. Collier & Son.
- Alighieri, Dante; Norton, Charles E. (trans.) (2005) [1891]. Dante's Purgatorio. Digireads. ISBN 9781420935288.
- Eliot, T. S (1917). Ezra Pound: His Metric and his Poetry. New York: Alfred A. Knopf. OCLC 983441.
- "Ezra Pound". Chicago: The Poetry Foundation. Archived from the original on 20 February 2014.
- Freer, Allen; Andrew, John, eds. (1970). Cambridge Book of English Verse 1900–1939. Cambridge: Cambridge University Press. ISBN 978-0-521-09625-6.
- Moody, David A (2007). Ezra Pound: Poet: A Portrait of the Man and His Work, Volume I, The Young Genius 1885–1920. Oxford: Oxford University Press. ISBN 978-0-19-957146-8.
- Pound, Ezra (2003) [1948]. Sieburth, Richard (ed.). The Pisan Cantos. New York: New Directions. ISBN 0-8112-1558-X.
- Pound, Ezra (1976). King, Michael (ed.). Collected Early Poems of Ezra Pound. Oxford: Oxford University Press. ISBN 978-0-8112-0608-2.
- Stock, Noel (2012). The Life of Ezra Pound. London: Routledge. ISBN 978-0-415-67896-4.
- Wilhelm, James J (2008). Ezra Pound in London and Paris, 1908–1925. New York: New Directions. ISBN 978-0-271-02798-2.
- Witemeyer, Hugh (2005). "A Lume Spento". In Demetres P Tryphonopoulos; Stephen Adams (eds.). The Ezra Pound Encyclopedia. Westport, Conn: Greenwood Press. pp. 185–86. ISBN 978-0-313-06143-1.
- Zinnes, Harriet, ed. (1980). Ezra Pound and the Visual Arts. New York: New Directions Publishing. ISBN 978-0-8112-0772-0.
