= William Brooke Smith =

American painter (died 1908)

William Brooke Smith (died 1908) was an American painter and friend of Ezra Pound. His death from tuberculosis greatly affected Pound, who dedicated his first poetry collection, A Lume Spento, to Smith.

== Life ==
William Brooke Smith was living in Philadelphia by 1901. In a 1921 letter to William Carlos Williams, Smith's friend Ezra Pound wrote "How in Christ's name he came to be in Phila.—and to know what he did at age 17–25—I don't know." Pound's friend Hilda Doolittle recalled that Smith was "tall, graceful, with a 'butterfly bow' tie", and that a letter he had sent Pound was "poetic, effusive, written, it appeared, with a careful spacing of lines and unextravagant margin".

Smith met Pound, then a freshman at the University of Pennsylvania, in 1901 or 1902, when the latter was aged sixteen. The two became friends, in one of Pound's first true friendships. As Smith was an avid reader, he introduced Pound to the works of English decadents such as Oscar Wilde and Aubrey Beardsley; this included gifting Pound a copy of Wilde's Salome. Smith's sister had given him a copy of Edward FitzGerald's The Rubaiyat, containing works by Sufi writer Omar Khayyam. As such, Pound's daughter Mary de Rachewiltz suggests that the two may have discussed "Soufi and Mystics, wine, beauty, Pantheism, and painting".

From 1902 to 1905 Smith studied at the Philadelphia College of Art, living on Diamond Street. Pound would sometimes attend classes with him. After graduation, Smith and Pound kept in touch. One letter from Smith, from 1907, was posted from a home on Franklin Street.

== Death and legacy ==
Smith died in 1908 of tuberculosis. When news of this reached Pound, he was devastated. He soon renamed the poetry collection he had been working on, meant to be titled La Fraisne (The Ash Tree) after one of its first poems, as A Lume Spento (With Tapers Spent). In his dedication, Pound wrote:

... sith one of has gone out from amongst us it [is] given
A LUME SPENTO
(WITH TAPERS QUENCHED)
in memoriam eius mihi caritate primus
WILLIAM BROOKE SMITH
Painter, Dreamer of dreams

The title of the collection, A Lume Spento, is a reference to the third canto of Dante's Purgatorio, is an allusion to the death of Manfred, King of Sicily, and his funeral procession in the earlier work. Pound critic Hugh Witemeyer writes that, overall, the implication is that Smith had led an unorthodox life like that of Manfred, a conclusion with which Daniel Tiffany agrees, writing that the dedication implied Smith was "a heretic of sorts, a renegade".

Smith's death continued to weigh on Pound; he wrote in 1922 that "thirteen years are gone; I haven't replaced him and shan't and no longer hope to". Tiffany finds that, in Canto 77, Pound refers to Smith as "the wraith of my best friend", an allusion to Dante's description of his best friend, Guido Cavalcanti; Mary Paterson Cheadle concurs with this conclusion, though she suggests sculptor Henri Gaudier-Brzeska as another possibility. Tiffany describes Smith as still "haunting" Pound in Hugh Selwyn Mauberley, as Elpenor to Odysseus, and writes that, ultimately, Pound was unable to put the "ghost" to rest.

Letters between Smith and Pound were rediscovered by James J. Wilhelm and published in 1990. Tiffany writes that these letters show "the closeness of their friendship – and perhaps something more than friendship": in these 1907 letters, Smith refers to Pound as "my dear boy", writes that Pound is "very dear to me", and reminds him to "take the best care of yourself, especially the part that isn't seen".

== Works cited ==
- Cheadle, Mary Paterson (1997). Ezra Pound's Confucian Translations. Ann Arbor: University of Michigan Press. ISBN 978-0-472-10754-4.
- Doolittle, Hilda (1979). End to Torment. New York: New Directions Publishing. ISBN 978-0-8112-0720-1.
- Nadel, Ira, ed. (1999). The Cambridge Companion to Ezra Pound. Cambridge: Cambridge University Press. ISBN 978-0-521-64920-9.
- de Rachewiltz, Mary (1993). "Ezra Pound's Library: What Remains". Ezra Pound and Europe. Atlanta: Rodopi. pp. 1–18. ISBN 978-90-5183-521-2.
- Ruthven, K K (2002). Ezra Pound as a Literary Critic. London: Routledge. ISBN 978-0-203-32900-9.
- Stock, Noel (2012). The Life of Ezra Pound. London: Routledge. ISBN 978-0-415-67896-4.
- Tiffany, Daniel (1995). Radio Corpse: Imagism and the Cryptaesthetic of Ezra Pound. Cambridge: Harvard University Press. ISBN 978-0-674-74662-6.
- Witemeyer, Hugh (2005). "A Lume Spento". In Demetres P Tryphonopoulos; Stephen Adams (eds.). The Ezra Pound Encyclopedia. Westport, Conn: Greenwood Press. pp. 185–86. ISBN 978-0-313-06143-1.
- Zinnes, Harriet, ed. (1980). Ezra Pound and the Visual Arts. New York: New Directions Publishing. ISBN 978-0-8112-0772-0.
