= Endon =

Village in Staffordshire, England

Coordinates: 53.078825°N 2.111225°W

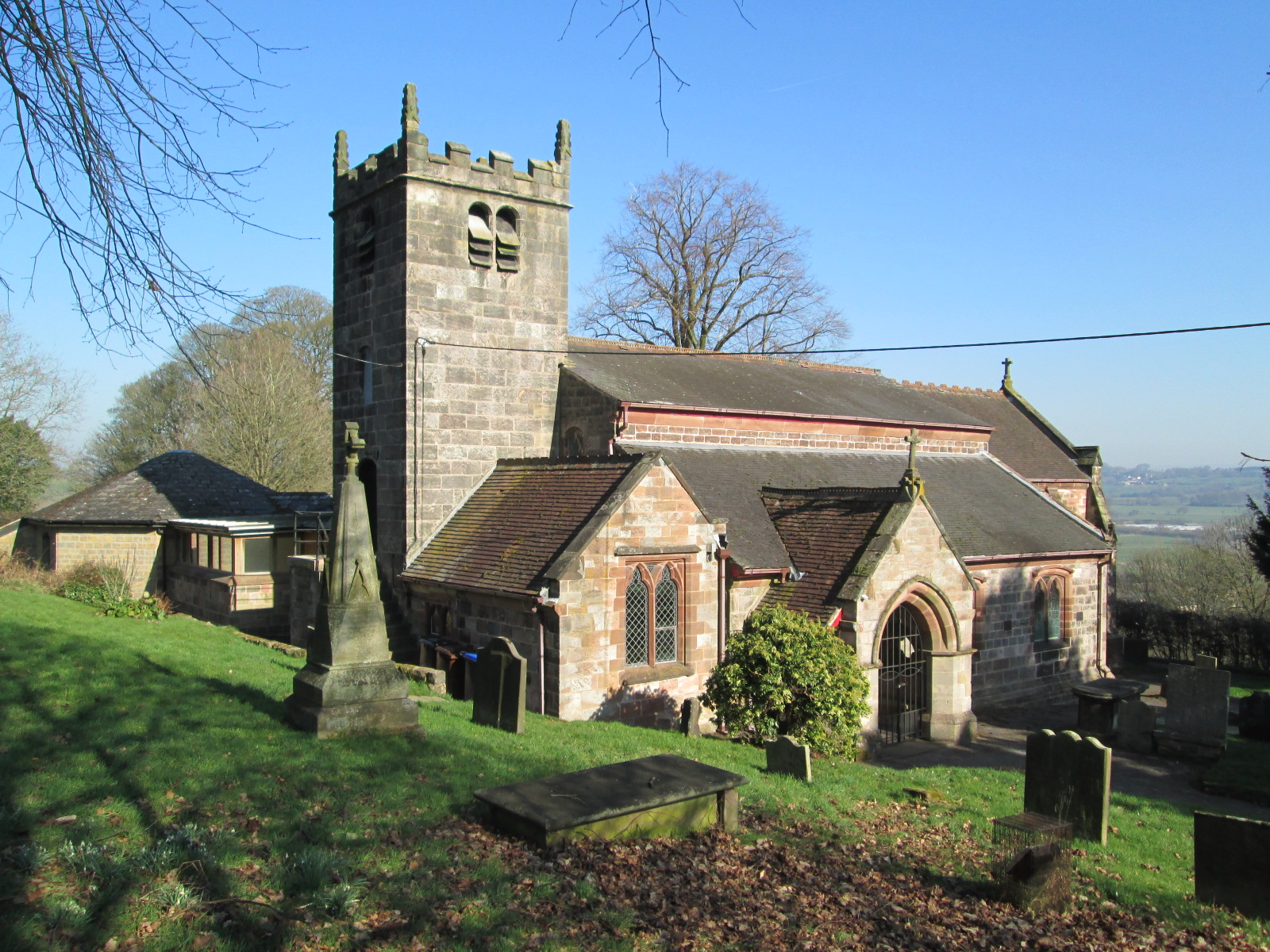
- Parish Church of St Luke, Endon

- Location within Staffordshire
- Population: 3,221 (2011)
- OS grid reference: SJ925535
  - London: 138 mi (222 km) SE
- Civil parish: Endon and Stanley
- District: Staffordshire Moorlands
- Shire county: Staffordshire
- Region: West Midlands
- Country: England
- Sovereign state: United Kingdom
- Post town: STOKE-ON-TRENT
- Postcode district: ST9
- Dialling code: 01782
- Police: Staffordshire
- Fire: Staffordshire
- Ambulance: West Midlands

Endon is a village within the Staffordshire Moorlands district of Staffordshire, England. It is 4 miles (6.4 km) southwest of Leek and 6 miles (9.7 km) north-northeast of Stoke-on-Trent. Endon was formerly a township in civil parish of Leek.

Together with neighbouring Stanley, Endon forms the civil parish of Endon and Stanley.

The local education consists of three schools; St. Luke's Church of England Primary School, Endon Hall Primary School and Endon High School.

== Local features ==
The Caldon Canal, a branch of the Trent & Mersey Canal, passes around Endon.

The Ashes, a 17th-century house, lies to the north of the village.

== Railway ==
The Endon railway station was opened by the North Staffordshire Railway on 1 November 1867 and operated for almost 100 years, closing in 1963. There are ambitious plans in hand to develop passenger facilities at Endon, bringing the village station back to life after decades of disuse. The project to reconnect Endon is a joint partnership between Moorland & City Railways and Churnet Valley Railway. Volunteers working on behalf of Churnet Valley Railway, will carry out repairs on the four-mile stretch of track, supported by contractors.

Reaching Endon will be a major milestone for the expansion project, and will mean that passenger trains will reconnect the outskirts of the Potteries with the Churnet Valley and Leek area for the first time since the cut backs of the Beeching Axe. It is also intended to make it possible to travel directly from Endon to Alton towers on this passenger train. Later, the intention is to reconnect Endon to Stoke-on-Trent. Large amounts of funding are required to meet this aim.

== Well dressing ==
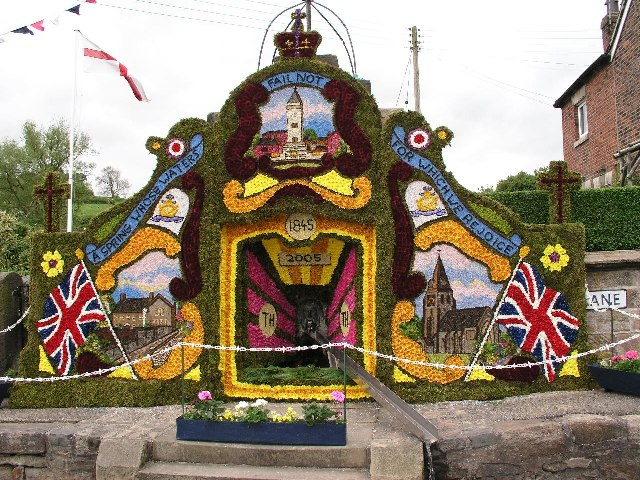
Well dressing in Endon

The village is unusual in the respect that it is one of only a few outside Derbyshire which practises the ancient custom of Well dressing. A weekend fair accompanies the dressing of the well at which a local girl is crowned as the Well Dressing Queen. The fair also includes a contest called "Tossing the Sheaf" where local men compete to see who can toss a bale of straw the highest over a raised bar. The fair is known for bringing the entire village together, which is a rare occasion for most modern villages.

== Literary and musical associations ==
T. E. Hulme (1883–1917), an English critic and poet, was born at Gratton Hall. Through his writings on art, literature and politics, he had a notable influence upon modernism.

The opening line of the iconic 1976 Sutherland Brothers and Quiver hit "Arms of Mary": "the lights shine down the valley", was written by Iain Sutherland who was looking from a Stockton Brook farm house down over Endon.

== See also ==
- Listed buildings in Endon and Stanley
