= Gerald Horsley =

British architect & draughtsman (1862-1917)

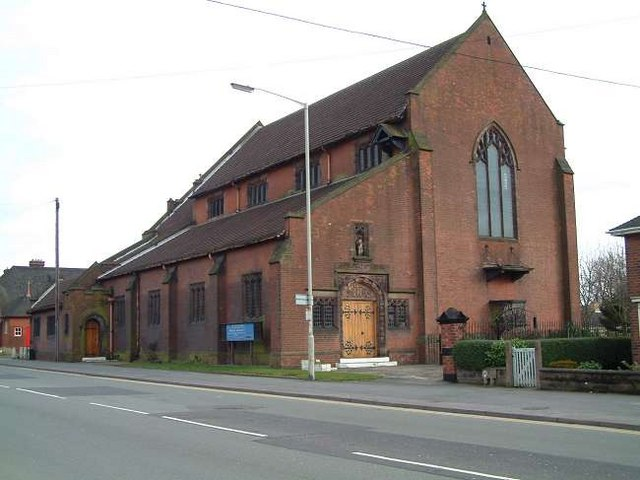
All Saints' Church, Joiners Square, Stoke-on-Trent designed by Horsley

Gerald Callcott Horsley (31 October 1862, in Glasgow – 2 July 1917, in Crowborough, East Sussex) was a British architect and draughtsman who lived in London.

== Life ==
Horsley was the son of the painter John Callcott Horsley. He was articled to Norman Shaw from 1879 to 1882, and in 1883 became his assistant. From 1884 to 1885 he was assistant to John Dando Sedding.

In 1883, Horsley was a founder member of the St George's Art Society, 1884 of the Art-Workers' Guild. He was the first recipient, in 1887 and again in 1888, of the Owen Jones Studentship of the Royal Institute of British Architects (RIBA) which took him twice to Italy.

A RIBA associate in 1890, he left the institute in 1892 in protest against plans for compulsory registration of architects; he rejoined as a fellow in 1906.

From 1911 to 1913, Horsley was president of the Architectural Association.

== Works ==
Horsley was first influenced by the Arts and Crafts Movement and built a number of country residences. His best known buildings are in a Baroque revival style following the examples of Christopher Wren. In this style he designed St Paul's Girls' School in Hammersmith (1901–1902; Music School added in 1914) and a few stations for the North Western Railway such as Hatch End station (1911).

Some churches like St Chad's Church, Longsdon, Staffordshire (1902–1906) are Gothic buildings.

Horsley was also an excellent draughtsman and submitted views of historic monuments to the annual exhibitions of the Royal Academy all his life. He also prepared presentation drawings for architect colleagues. Horsley was the illustrator of A History of Gothic Art in England by E. S. Prior (published 1900).
