= Poets' Club =

Former poetry discussion group in London

The Poets' Club was a group devoted to the discussion of poetry. It met in London in the early years of the twentieth century. It was founded by Henry Simpson, a banker. T. E. Hulme helped set up the group in 1908, and was its first secretary.

Hulme wrote a charter document: "Rules 1908". The group comprised mainly amateurs and met once a month, excluding the summer months of July, August, and September, for dinner, the reading of poems, and the presentation of short (20 minute) papers on various topics relating to poetry. Around the end of 1908 Hulme read the Club his A Lecture on Modern Poetry. The Club produced several anthologies; the first two being — For Christmas MDCCCCVIII (January 1909) and The Book of the Poets' Club (December 1909). Two of Hulme's poems were included in the first, "Autumn" and "A City Sunset," and another two in the second. These are regarded as the first examples of Imagism.

In 1909, Hulme began a side-project with F.S. Flint, both a critic and friend of the Poets' Club, called "The School of Images," introducing Ezra Pound to the group in April 1909. This group lasted less than a year but anticipated and motivated the Imagist movement.

The fourth and final anthology of the Poets' Club — Christmas 1913 — contained work by writers including: John Todhunter, E. Nesbit, Victor Plarr, Henry Simpson, Alexander von Herder, A. St. John Adcock, Selwyn Image, and Margaret Scott Thomson.

== Sources ==
- Patrick McGuinness (editor), T. E. Hulme: Selected Writings, Fyfield Books, Carcanet Press, 1998. ISBN 1-85754-362-9 (page xii)
- Jewel Spears Brooker, Mastery and Escape: T. S. Eliot, University of Massachusetts Press, 1996, ISBN 1-55849-040-X. (page 48)
