= T. E. Hulme =

English poet (1883–1917)

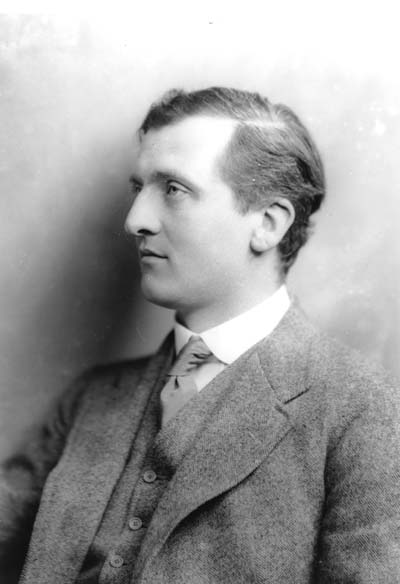
- Hulme in 1912
- Born: Thomas Ernest Hulme; 16 September 1883; Endon, Staffordshire, United Kingdom
- Died: 28 September 1917 (aged 34); Oostduinkerke, West Flanders, Belgium
- Resting place: Coxyde Military Cemetery
- Education: University of Cambridge; University College London
- Occupations: Poet; critic
- Writing career
- Pen name: North Staffs
- Years active: 1907–1917
- Military career
- Allegiance: United Kingdom
- Branch: British Army; Royal Navy
- Service years: 1914–1917
- Rank: Lieutenant
- Units: Honourable Artillery Company; Royal Marine Artillery
- Conflicts: First World War †

Thomas Ernest Hulme (/hjuːm/; 16 September 1883 – 28 September 1917) was an English critic and poet who, through his writings on art, literature and politics, had a notable influence upon modernism. He was an aesthetic philosopher and the father of imagism.

== Early life and education ==
Thomas Ernest Hulme — called "Ernest" by his family — was born at Gratton Hall, Endon, Staffordshire, the son of Thomas Hulme and Mary, née Young. Thomas attempted farming, but "the life proved too strenuous" for him; when his son was still young the family relocated to a house on Endon Bank, and Thomas went into business for a time as an auctioneer and sales agent before starting up a ceramics transfer business operating from a factory in Newcastle-under-Lyme. Thomas was "a remote and hard man" with an "explosive temper", but it was Mary Hulme that was "the disciplinarian in the family... a spirited, independent woman with a good sense of humour and a command of repartee." Thomas Hulme's father, also Thomas, who lived at nearby Dunwood Hall, was a successful pawnbroker whose death in 1884 "left his family well provided for". The Hulmes were wealthy; they "had chauffeurs and gardeners at Endon Bank, but the family had regional accents rather than Oxbridge accents and there was more social mixing across the classes than was common in the cities."

Hulme was educated at Newcastle-under-Lyme High School and, from 1902, St John's College, Cambridge, where he read mathematics, but was sent down in 1904 after rowdy behaviour on Boat Race night. He was thrown out of Cambridge a second time after a scandal involving a Roedean girl. He returned to his studies at University College London, before travelling around Canada and spending time in Brussels acquiring languages.

== Career ==
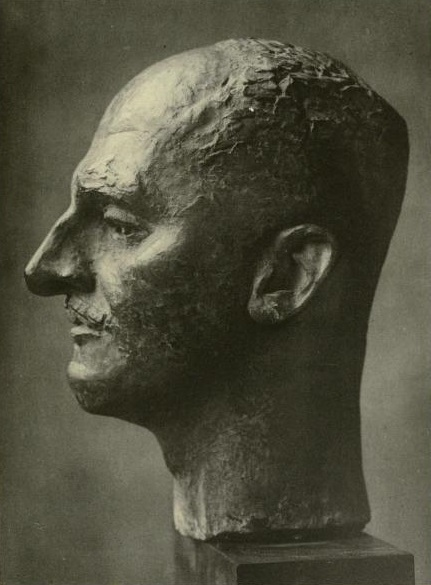
Bust of T. E. Hulme by Jacob Epstein

From about 1907 Hulme became interested in philosophy, translating works by Henri Bergson and sitting in on lectures at Cambridge. He translated Georges Sorel's Reflections on Violence. The most important influences on his thought were Bergson, who asserted that "human experience is relative, but religious and ethical values are absolute" and, later, Wilhelm Worringer (1881–1965), German art historian and critic – in particular his Abstraktion und Einfühlung (Abstraction and Empathy, 1908). Hulme was influenced by Remy de Gourmont's aristocratic concept of art and his studies of sensibility and style. From 1909 Hulme contributed critical articles to The New Age, edited by A. R. Orage.

Hulme developed an interest in poetry and wrote a small number of poems. He was made secretary of the Poets' Club, attended by such establishment figures as Edmund Gosse and Henry Newbolt. There he encountered Ezra Pound and F. S. Flint. In late 1908 Hulme delivered his paper A Lecture on Modern Poetry to the club. Hulme's poems "Autumn" and "A City Sunset", both published in 1909 in a Poets' Club anthology, have the distinction of being the first Imagist poems. A further five poems were published in The New Age in 1912 as The Complete Poetical Works of T. E. Hulme. Despite this misleading title, Hulme in fact wrote about 25 poems totalling some 260 lines, of which the majority were possibly written between 1908 and 1910. Robert Frost met Hulme in 1913 and was influenced by his ideas. The publisher of the book Ripostes (to which Pound appended the 'complete' poetical works of T. E. Hulme) spoke in that book of Hulme "the meta-physician, who achieves great rhythmical beauty in curious verse-forms".

In his critical writings Hulme distinguished between Romanticism, a style informed by a belief in the infinite in man and nature, characterised by Hulme as "spilt religion", and Classicism, a mode of art stressing human finitude, formal restraint, concrete imagery and, in Hulme's words, "dry hardness". Similar views were later expressed by T. S. Eliot. Hulme's ideas had a major effect on Wyndham Lewis and for a time the two were friends, later coming to blows over Kate Lechmere, Lewis coming off the worse during this encounter which ended when Hulme hung Lewis upside down by the cuffs of his trousers from the railings of Great Ormond Street. He championed the art of Jacob Epstein and David Bomberg, was a friend of Gaudier-Brzeska, and was in on the debut of Lewis's literary magazine BLAST and vorticism.

Hulme's politics were conservative, and he moved further to the right after 1911 as a result of contact with Pierre Lasserre, who was associated with Action Française.

== First World War ==
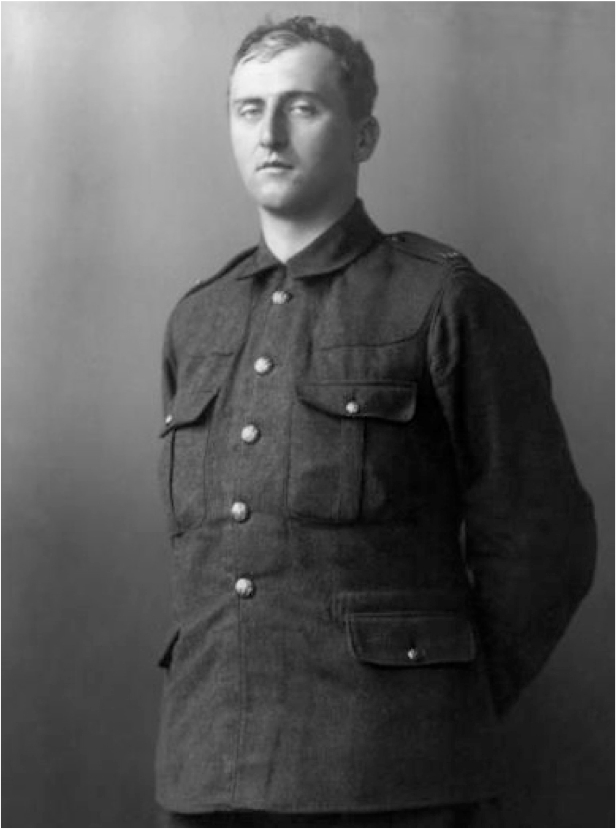
T. E. Hulme in army uniform

Hulme volunteered as an artilleryman in 1914 and served with the Honourable Artillery Company and later the Royal Marine Artillery in France and Belgium. He kept up his writing for The New Age. Notable publications during this period for that magazine were "War Notes", written under the pen name "North Staffs", and "A Notebook", which contains some of his most organised critical writing. Hulme was commissioned as an officer in June 1915 and eventually became a lieutenant in the Royal Marines. He was wounded in 1916.

=== Death ===
Back at the front in 1917, he was killed by a shell at Oostduinkerke near Nieuwpoort, in West Flanders. According to Robert Ferguson:

On 28 September 1917, four days after his thirty-fourth birthday, Hulme suffered a direct hit from a large shell which literally blew him to pieces. Apparently absorbed in some thought of his own he had failed to hear it coming and remained standing while those around threw themselves flat on the ground. What was left of him was buried in the Military Cemetery at Koksijde, West-Vlaanderen, in Belgium where—no doubt for want of space—he is described simply as 'One of the War poets'.

== Works ==
- Notes on Language and Style (1929, University of Washington Book Store); in The Criterion, Vol. 3, No. 12, (July 1925) (ed. Herbert Read)
- Speculations: Essays on Humanism and the Philosophy of Art (1936, K. Paul, Trench, Trubner & Co., Ltd.), edited by Herbert Read
- Further Speculations of T. E. Hulme (1955, University of Minnesota), edited by Samuel Hynes
- The Collected Writings of T. E. Hulme (1996, OUP), edited by Karen Csengeri
- Selected Writings of T. E. Hulme (2003, Fyfield Books), edited by Patrick McGuinness

=== Selected poems ===
- Above the Dock
- Autumn
- A City Sunset
- Conversion
- The Embankment
- Mana Aboda
- The Man in the Crow's Nest
- Susan Ann and Immortality
- The Poet
- A Tall Woman
- A Sudden Secret
- In the Quiet Land
- At Night!
- Town Sky-line

=== As translator ===
- Henri Bergson, An Introduction to Metaphysics, (1912)
- Georges Sorel, Reflections on Violence, (1915)

=== Articles ===
- "Belated Romanticism," The New Age, Vol. IV, No. 17, 1909.
- "The New Philosophy," The New Age, Vol. V, No. 10, 1909.
- "Bergson and Bax," The New Age, Vol. V, No. 13, 1909.
- "Searchers after Reality: Bax," The New Age, Vol. V, No. 14, 1909.
- "Searchers after Reality: Haldane," The New Age, Vol. V, No. 17, 1909.
- "A Note on 'La Foi'," The New Age, Vol. V, No. 27, 1909.
- "Searchers after Reality: Jules De Gaultier," The New Age, Vol. VI, No. 5, 1909.
- "Notes on the Bologna Congress," The New Age, Vol. VIII, No. 26, 1911.
- "Bergsonism in Paris," The New Age, Vol. IX, No. 8, 1911.
- "Bax on Bergson," The New Age, Vol. IX, No. 14, 1911.
- "Notes on Bergson," The New Age, Vol. IX, No. 25, 1911.
- "Notes on Bergson II," The New Age, Vol. IX, No. 26, 1911.
- "Mr. Balfour, Bergson, and Politics," The New Age, Vol. X, No. 2, 1911.
- "Notes on Bergson III," The New Age, Vol. X, No. 4, 1911.
- "Notes on Bergson IV," The New Age, Vol. X, No. 5, 1911.
- "Notes on Bergson V," The New Age, Vol. X, No. 17, 1912.
- "Mr. Epstein and the Critics," The New Age, Vol. XIV, No. 8, 1913.
- "German Chronicle", Poetry and Drama, Vol. II, 1914.
- "Modern Art: The Grafton Group," The New Age, Vol. XIV, No. 11, 1914.
- "Modern Art: A Preface Note and Neo-Realism," The New Age, Vol. XIV, No. 15, 1914.
- "Modern Art: The London Group," The New Age, Vol. XIV, No. 21, 1914.
- "Modern Art: Mr. David Bomberg's Show," The New Age, Vol. XV, No. 10, 1914.
- "The Translator's Preface to Sorel's 'Reflections on Violence'," The New Age, Vol. XVII, No. 24, 1915.
- "War Notes," The New Age, Vol. XVIII, No. 2, 1915 (as North Staffs).
- "War Notes," The New Age, Vol. XVIII, No. 3, 1915 (as North Staffs).
- "War Notes," The New Age, Vol. XVIII, No. 4, 1915 (as North Staffs).
- "War Notes," The New Age, Vol. XVIII, No. 5, 1915 (as North Staffs).
- "A Notebook," The New Age, Vol. XVIII, No. 5, 1915.
- "War Notes," The New Age, Vol. XVIII, No. 6, 1915 (as North Staffs).
- "A Notebook," The New Age, Vol. XVIII, No. 6, 1915.
- "War Notes," The New Age, Vol. XVIII, No. 7, 1915 (as North Staffs).
- "A Notebook," The New Age, Vol. XVIII, No. 7, 1915.
- "War Notes," The New Age, Vol. XVIII, No. 8, 1915 (as North Staffs).
- "A Notebook," The New Age, Vol. XVIII, No. 8, 1915.
- "War Notes," The New Age, Vol. XVIII, No. 9, 1915 (as North Staffs).
- "War Notes," The New Age, Vol. XVIII, No. 10, 1916 (as North Staffs).
- "A Notebook," The New Age, Vol. XVIII, No. 10, 1916.
- "War Notes," The New Age, Vol. XVIII, No. 11, 1916 (as North Staffs).
- "War Notes," The New Age, Vol. XVIII, No. 12, 1916 (as North Staffs).
- "War Notes," The New Age, Vol. XVIII, No. 13, 1916 (as North Staffs).
- "A Notebook," The New Age, Vol. XVIII, No. 13, 1916.
- "War Notes," The New Age, Vol. XVIII, No. 14, 1916 (as North Staffs).
- "War Notes," The New Age, Vol. XVIII, No. 15, 1916 (as North Staffs).
- "A Notebook," The New Age, Vol. XVIII, No. 15, 1916.
- "War Notes," The New Age, Vol. XVIII, No. 16, 1916 (as North Staffs).
- "War Notes," The New Age, Vol. XVIII, No. 17, 1916 (as North Staffs).
- "War Notes," The New Age, Vol. XVIII, No. 18, 1916 (as North Staffs).
- "The Note-Books of T. E. Hulme," The New Age, Vol. XXX, No. 12, 1922.
- "The Note-Books of T. E. Hulme: II," The New Age, Vol. XXX, No. 13, 1922.
- "The Note-Books of T. E. Hulme: III," The New Age, Vol. XXX, No. 15, 1922.
- "The Note-Books of T. E. Hulme: IV," The New Age, Vol. XXX, No. 16, 1922.
- "The Note-Books of T. E. Hulme: Bergson's Theory of Art," The New Age, Vol. XXX, No. 22, 1922.
- "The Note-Books of T. E. Hulme: Bergson's Theory of Art, II", The New Age, Vol. XXX, No. 23, 1922.
- "The Note-Books of T. E. Hulme: Bergson's Theory of Art, III", The New Age, Vol. XXX, No. 24, 1922.
