= Antanas Vaičius =

Lithuanian Roman Catholic prelate and bishop

The Most Reverend Antanas Vaičius
- Diocesan Bishop of Telšiai
- Appointed: 5 July 1982 (as Apostolic Administrator); 10 March 1989 (as Diocesan Bishop)
- Term ended: 26 May 2001
- Predecessor: Juozapas Pletkus (as Ap.Administrator)
- Successor: Jonas Boruta, SJ
- Previous post: Titular Bishop of Sullectum (1982–1989)

Orders
- Ordination: 24 September 1950 by Kazimieras Paltarokas
- Consecration: 25 July 1982 by Liudas Povilonis

Personal details
- Born: Antanas Vaičius; 5 April 1926 Geidučiai, Klaipėda County, Lithuania
- Died: 25 November 2008 (aged 82) Telšiai, Telšiai County, Lithuania
- Buried: Telšiai Cathedral
- Education: Telšiai Priest Seminary, Kaunas Priest Seminary

Antanas Vaičius (5 April 1926 – 25 November 2008) was a Lithuanian Roman Catholic prelate, who served as an Apostolic Administrator (1982–1989) and Diocesan Bishop (1989–2001) of the Roman Catholic Diocese of Telšiai.

== Early years ==
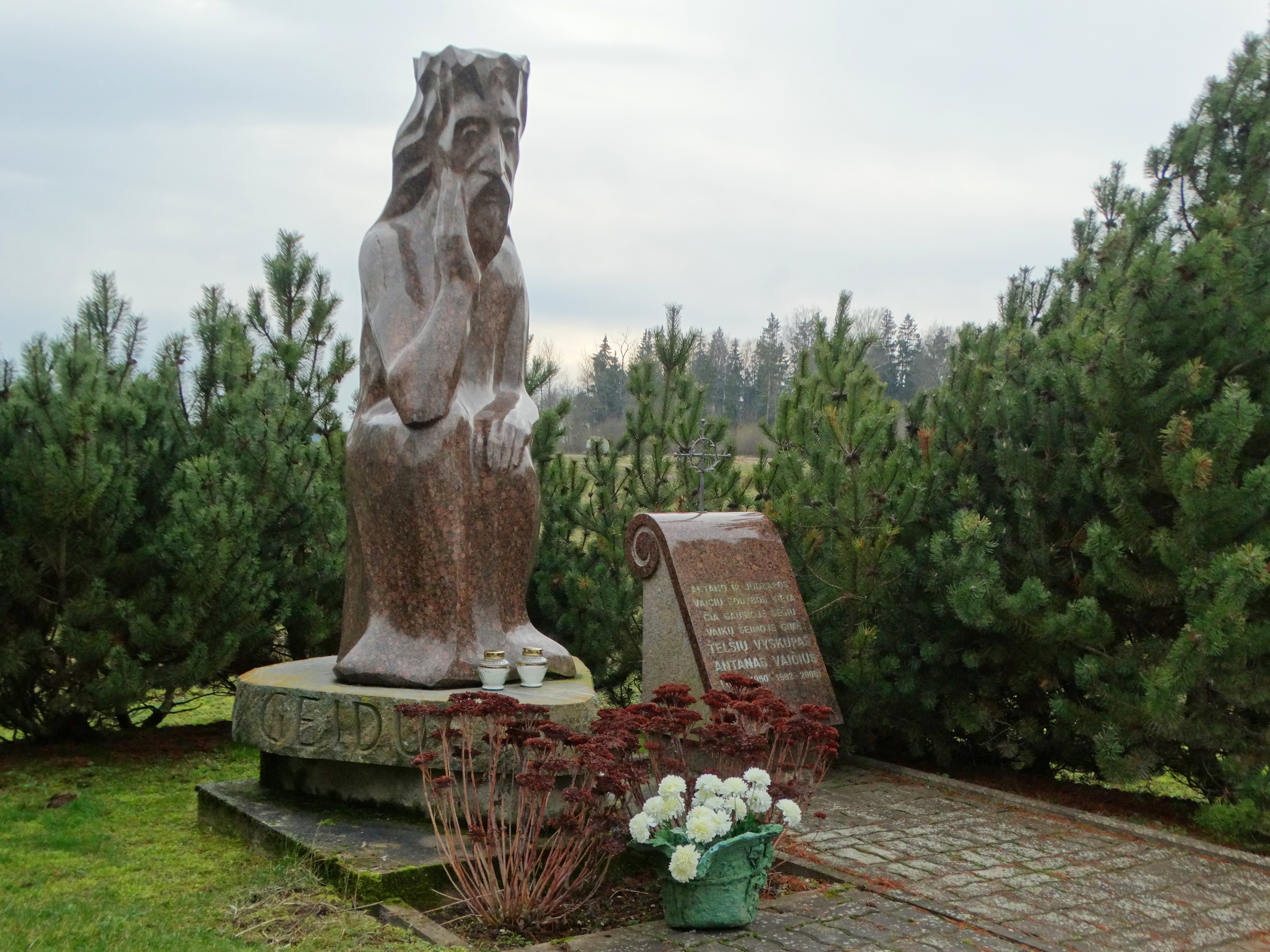
the Pensive Christ monument in his native Geidučiai, dedicated to bishop Antanas Vaičius

Born in Geidučiai, present day Skuodas District Municipality, in a farmers family with four sisters and one brother, Antanas Vaičius during 1934–1943 studied in Šačiai, Mosėdis and Skuodas schools and joined to the Telšiai Bishop Vincentas Borisevičius Priest Seminary, where studied until 1946, when this seminary was closed by Soviets. From 1946 to 1951 he studied in the Kaunas Priest Seminary. During his studies, he was ordained to the priesthood for the Diocese of Telšiai by bishop Kazimieras Paltarokas on 24 September 1950.

== Pastoral and diocesan work ==
Father Vaičius worked as an assistant priest, and after – as a parish priest in a various parishes of the Diocese of Telšiai: Plungė, Žygaičiai, Klaipėda, Salantai, Lauko Soda, Akmenė, Viekšniai and Telšiai. On 3 October 1975, he was elected as a Vicar Capitluar for the vacant Diocese of Telšiai and the Roman Catholic Territorial Prelature of Klaipėda.

On 5 July 1982, Pope John Paul II appointed him Titular Bishop of Sullectum and Apostolic Administrator of the Roman Catholic Diocese of Telšiai. Bishop Vaičius received his episcopal consecration on 25 July 1982 in the Cathedral Basilica of apostles St. Peter and St. Paul of Kaunas from Bishop Liudas Povilonis, with Bishops Romualdas Krikšciunas and Vincentas Sladkevičius as co-consecrators. During 1988–1993 he served as the vice-president of the Lithuanian Bishops' Conference.

Bishop Vaičius retired on 26 May 2001, after reaching the age limit of 75 years old and lived in Telšiai.

Catholic Church titles
Preceded by Vicente Ramón Hernández Peña	Titular Bishop of Sullectum; 1982–1989	Succeeded by Benjamín Jiménez Hernández
Preceded by Juozapas Pletkus	Apostolic Administrator of the Diocese of Telšiai; 1982–1989	Succeeded by himself as Diocesan Bishop
Preceded by himself as Apostolic Administrator	Diocese of Telšiai; 1989–2001	Succeeded by Jonas Boruta
