= Diocese of Telšiai =

Roman Catholic diocese in Lithuania

Coordinates: 55°59′N 22°15′E

Diocese of Telšiai Dioecesis Telsensis (-Klaipedensis) Telšių vyskupija
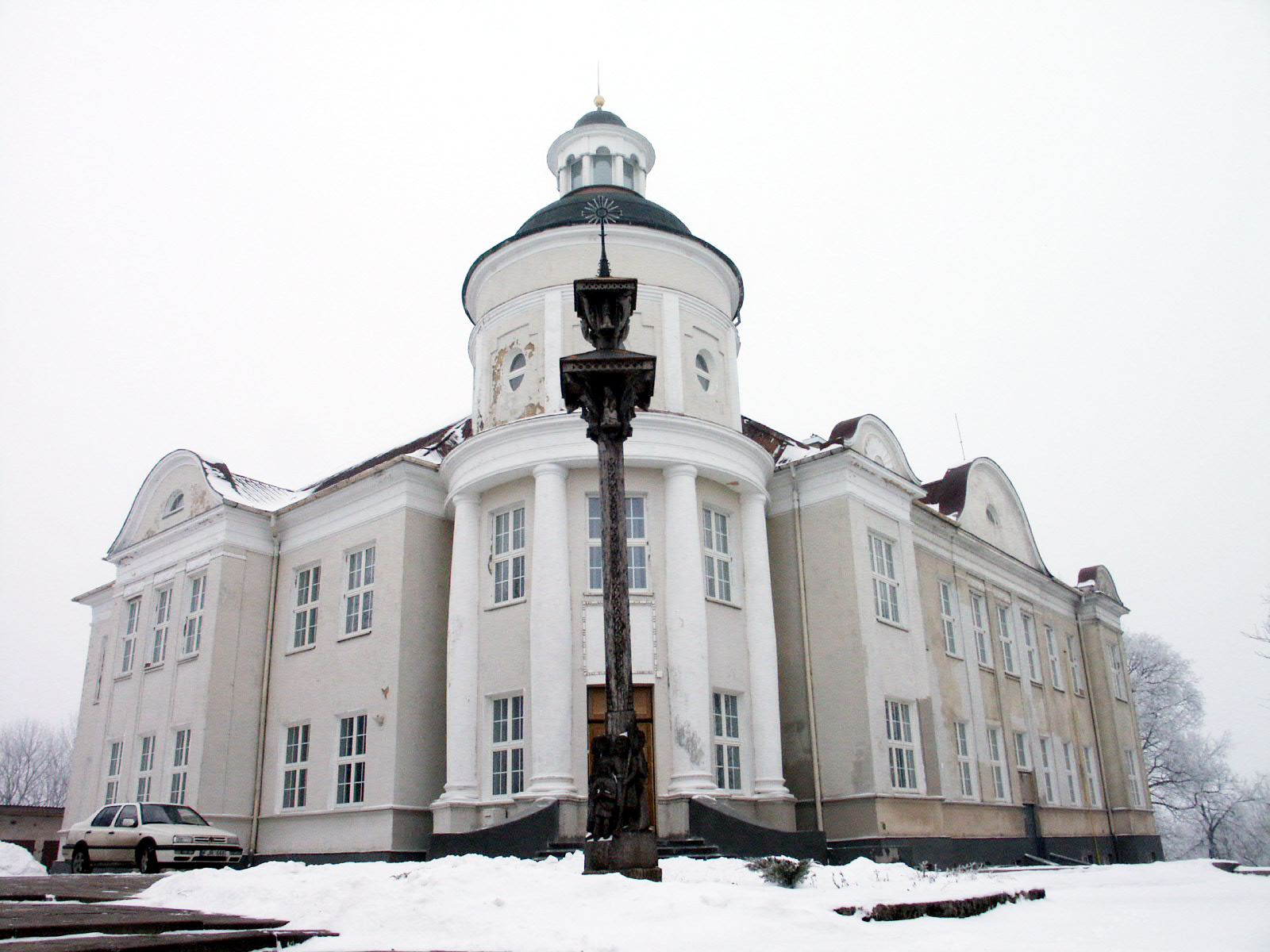

Location
- Country: Lithuania
- Ecclesiastical province: Kaunas
- Metropolitan: Kaunas

Statistics
- Area: 13,373 km^{2} (5,163 sq mi)
- Population: Total; Catholics: (as of 2014); 705,000; 564,000 (80%)

Information
- Sui iuris church: Latin Church
- Rite: Latin Rite
- Cathedral: Telšiai Cathedral
- Patron saint: Justin Martyr

Current leadership
- Pope: Leo XIV
- Bishop: Algirdas Jurevičius
- Metropolitan Archbishop: Kęstutis Kėvalas

Map
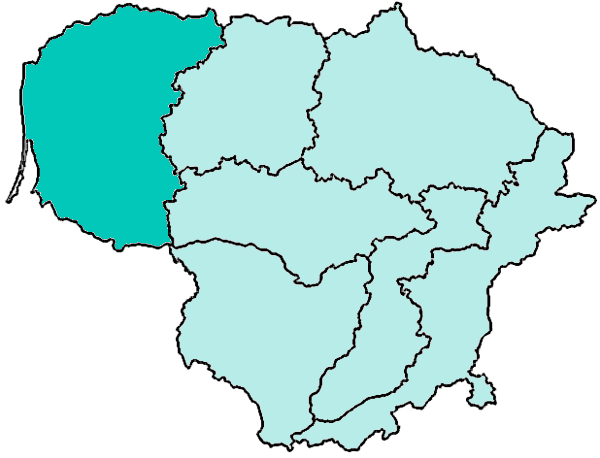
- Location of Diocese of Telšiai in Lithuania

The Roman Catholic Diocese of Telšiai (Latin: Telsen(sis)) is a suffragan Latin diocese in the ecclesiastical province of the Metropolitan of Kaunas, one of two in Lithuania.

== History ==
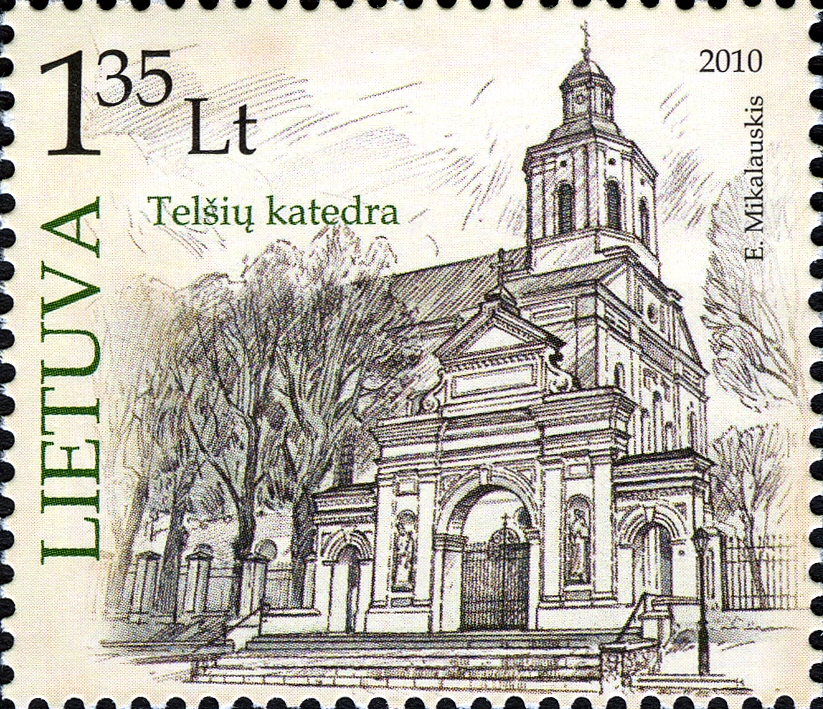
St Anthonys Cathedral, Telsiai

The diocese was established on 4 April 1926 on territory split off from the Diocese of Samogitia. On 28 May 1997, it lost territory to establish the Diocese of Šiauliai.

On 24 December 1991, the Territorial Prelature of Klaipėda (Memel), which had been seceded from the Diocese of Ermland on 4 April 1926, and was repeatedly held in personal union by the Bishops already, was merged into the Telšiai Diocese.

== Statistics ==
As of 2014, the diocese pastorally served 564,000 Catholics (80.0% of 705,000 total) on 13,373 square kilometres (5,163 sq mi) in 79 parishes and 95 missions with 164 priests (148 diocesan, 16 religious), 50 lay religious (18 brothers, 32 sisters) and 20 seminarians studying at the Telšiai Bishop Vincentas Borisevičius Priest Seminary.

== Special churches ==
Its cathedral is the Cathedral of St. Anthony of Padua in the city of Telšiai. It also has the former cathedral of the Diocese of Samogitia in Varniai and a minor basilica dedicated to the Visitation of the Blessed Virgin Mary in Žemaičių Kalvarija.

== Episcopal ordinaries ==
(all Roman rite)

Suffragan Bishops of Telšiai

- Justinas Staugaitis (1926.04.05 – death 1943.07.08), also Bishop-Prelate of Territorial Prelature of Klaipėda (Lithuania) (1926.04.05 – 1939)
  - Apostolic Administrator Vincentas Borisevičius (1943 – 1944.01.21), while Titular Bishop of Lysias (1940.02.03 – 1944.01.21 see below) as Auxiliary Bishop of Telšiai 1940.02.03 – 1944.01.21)
- Vincentas Borisevičius (see above 1944.01.21 – death 1946.11.18)
  - Apostolic Administrator Bishop Petras Maželis (1959.11.10 – 1964.02.14 see below) while Titular Bishop of Celenderis (1955.05.22 – 1964.02.14) as Auxiliary Bishop of Telšiai (1955.05.22 – 1964.02.14); previously Bishop-Prelate of Territorial Prelature of Klaipėda (Lithuania) (1949.12.20 – 1955.05.22)
- Petras Maželis (see above 1964.02.14 – death 1966.05.21), also again Bishop-Prelate of Klaipėda (1964.02.14 – 1966.05.21)
  - Apostolic Administrator Bishop Juozapas Pletkus (1967.11.08 – death 1975.09.29) while Titular Bishop of Tubia (1967.11.08 – 1975.09.29), also Apostolic Administrator of Klaipėda (Lithuania) (1967.11.08 – 1975.09.29)
  - Apostolic Administrator Bishop Antanas Vaičius (1982.07.05 – 1989.03.10 see below), Titular Bishop of Sullectum (1982.07.05 – 1989.03.10) and Apostolic Administrator of Klaipėda (Lithuania) (1982.07.05 – 1991.12.24)
- Antanas Vaičius (see above 1989.03.10 – retired 2001.05.26), died 2008
- Jonas Algimantas Boruta, SJ (2002.01.05 – 2017.09.18), previously Titular Bishop of Vulturara (1997.05.28 – 2002.01.05) as Auxiliary Bishop of Archdiocese of Vilnius (Lithuania) (1997.05.28 – 2002.01.05)
- Kęstutis Kėvalas (2017.09.18 – 2020.02.19), previously Titular Bishop of Abziri (2012.09.27 – 2017.04.20) as Auxiliary Bishop of Kaunas (Lithuania) (2012.09.27 – 2017.04.20), coadjutor bishop of Telšiai (2017.04.20 – 2017.09.18); later promoted as Archbishop of Kaunas (2020.02.19-).
- Algirdas Jurevičius (2020.06.01-), previously Titular Bishop of Materiana and Auxiliary Bishop of Kaunas (2018.07.02-2020.06.01)

=== Auxiliary episcopate ===
- Linas Vodopjanovas (Genadijus), OFM (2012.02.11 – 2016.05.20), appointed as Bishop of Panevėžys
- Jonas Kauneckas (2000.05.13 – 2002.01.05)
- Liudas Povilonis, MIC (1969.11.07 – 1973.07.07)
- Pranciskus Ramanauskas (1944.02.28 – 1959.10.17)

== Sources and external links ==
- GCatholic.org
- Catholic Hierarchy
- Diocese website
