= Antanas Lapė =

Lithuanian Catholic priest (1961–2007)

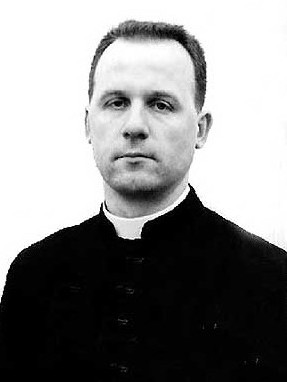
Mons. teol. lic. Antanas Lapė

Antanas Lapė (February 25, 1961 – January 8, 2007) was a Lithuanian Catholic priest, monsignor, academic, and rector of the Telšiai Priest Seminary. A member of the Lithuanian Catholic Academy of Science, he was recognized for his significant contributions to theological education and Church administration in Lithuania.

== Early life and education ==
Antanas Lapė was born on February 25, 1961, in the village of Jokšai, Klaipėda District Municipality, Antanas and Petronėlė (née Vaišnoraitė) Lapės, a family of Siberian deportees who had returned to Lithuania.

He began his education in 1968 at Gibišėliai Primary School in the Klaipėda District and later attended Palanga’s 1st Secondary School (now Palanga Old Gymnasium), graduating in 1979. That same year, he enrolled at the Faculty of Engineering Economics at Kaunas Polytechnic Institute (now Kaunas University of Technology), earning a degree in industrial economics and management in 1984.

== Early career ==
After graduating, Lapė began his professional career as an accountant at the Šiauliai Milk Plant. In 1988, he was promoted to the position of chief accountant, a role he held until 1991, when he decided to pursue a religious vocation.

== Religious life ==
In 1991, Lapė joined the Telšiai Priest Seminary. He was ordained as a priest on May 26, 1996, by Bishop Antanas Vaičius. Following his ordination, he was appointed Chancellor and Economist of the Telšiai Diocese Curia, where he oversaw the diocese's administrative and financial affairs.

Lapė furthered his theological education between 1997 and 2001 at the Catholic University of America in Washington, D.C., earning a Licentiate in Theology. His thesis, The Ecclesiology of Communion in the Encyclicals and Post-Synodal Apostolic Exhortations of John Paul II, examined the theological concept of communion in the writings of Pope John Paul II.

== Academic and pastoral contributions ==
After returning to Lithuania, Lapė assumed the roles of Vice Rector and Procurator of the Telšiai Priest Seminary, while also serving as a lecturer in dogmatic theology. On September 1, 2003, Bishop Jonas Boruta appointed him Rector of the Telšiai Bishop Vincentas Borisevičius Priest Seminary. As Rector, Lapė played a key role in shaping the seminary's academic programs and mentoring future generations of Lithuanian priests. He was also a member of the Lithuanian Catholic Academy of Science.

In addition to his academic and pastoral roles, Monsignor Antanas Lapė was an active member of the Telšiai Diocese's Priest Council, the College of Consultors, the Commission for Ordinations and Appointments, and the Permanent Council for Renovation and Building Maintenance. He also served as the Director of the Diocesan Family Center.

In recognition of his service, Pope John Paul II granted him the title of Monsignor on March 10, 2005, naming him a Chaplain of His Holiness.

== Later life and death ==
Due to declining health, Lapė resigned as Rector of the Telšiai Priest Seminary on March 29, 2006. He died on January 8, 2007, in Telšiai and was interred in the courtyard of Telšiai Cathedral, leaving behind a legacy of service and dedication to the Church.
