= Territorial Prelature of Klaipėda =

Catholic ecclesiastical district in Lithuania

Territorial Prelature of Klaipėda Territorialis Praelatura Klaipedensis Klaipėdos prelatūra
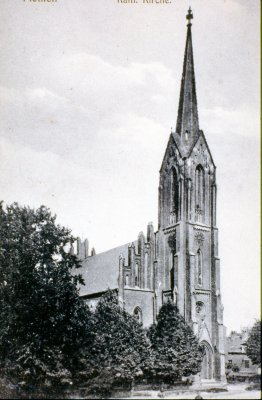
- Church of the Holy Trinity in Klaipėda (prelate church destroyed during World War II)

Location
- Country: Lithuania
- Ecclesiastical province: Immediate

Statistics
- Population: Total; Catholics: (as of 1939); 153,000; 25,000 (16%)
- Parishes: 5 (1939)
- Churches: 8 (1939)

Information
- Denomination: Roman Catholic
- Established: 1926
- Cathedral: Klaipėda
- Secular priests: 14

The Territorial Prelature of Klaipėda (Lithuanian: Klaipėdos prelatūra) was a Roman Catholic territorial prelature which existed from 1926 to 1991 in the Lithuanian coastal area of Klaipėda Region. Established as prelature nullius, it was administered by the bishop of Telšiai but was under the direct jurisdiction of the Holy See.

Klaipėda Region (Memel Territory, Memelland), detached from East Prussia after World War I, was mainly Lutheran and had only four Catholic parishes. However, after the incorporation into Lithuania in 1923, the number of Catholics rose from 8,000 in 1926 to 25,000 in 1939. As such, four new churches were completed in the 1930s. There were tensions and conflicts between the original residents and the newcomers from Lithuania proper. After World War II, the number of Catholics continued to grow but their activities were suppressed by the Soviets. The prelature was officially liquidated and incorporated into the Diocese of Telšiai in December 1991.

== History ==
=== Establishment ===
Klaipėda Region was part of the East Prussia until the Treaty of Versailles. Lithuania gained the region after the Klaipėda Revolt in 1923. The area, like much the rest of East Prussia, was mostly Lutheran in contrast with Lithuania which is overwhelmingly Roman Catholic. The region had only four Catholic parishes in Klaipėda, Šilutė, Ropkojai, and Viešvilė. Together with three other parishes that remained in Prussia, they formed a deanery that belonged to the Diocese of Warmia (Ermland). It is estimated that there were about 8,000 Catholics in the area of the prelature in 1926.

The Lithuanian ecclesiastical province of the Archdiocese of Kaunas was established by the papal bull Lithuanorum Gente issued on 4 April 1926. Germany lobbied for the parishes to remain within the Diocese of Warmia while Lithuanians wanted them fully incorporated into a Lithuanian diocese. The papal bull adopted a compromise – the parishes became prelature nullius administered by the bishop of Telšiai "observing the provisions of local circumstances". Thus while administered by a Lithuanian bishop, the prelature fell directly under the jurisdiction of the Holy See.

=== Interwar ===
==== Administration ====
The Klaipėda Convention placed religious affairs under the jurisdiction of local authorities of the region (i.e. the Directorate and the Parliament). Therefore, new openings for priests had to be first approved by the civil authorities. The priests did not receive sufficient income from their pastoral duties. Therefore, they were paid a salary by the Directorate which was lower than what priests could make in Prussia. Germany covered the difference thus ensuring its influence on the clergy. There were disagreements between the bishop and the Directorate on the salaries paid to newly appointed priests.

Albert Dannelautzki was the pastor of the Church of the Holy Trinity in Klaipėda which became the prelate church. He became dean of Klaipėda deanery.

The cannon law required that prelature had an advisory council. In 1930, bishop Justinas Staugaitis requested an exemption from the Congregation for Bishops as the prelature was so small. The congregation agreed, but mandated that Staugaitis selected his deputy from priests in the region. Staugaitis initially chose the pastor of Šilutė, but he refused explaining that Dannelautzki had much greater authority among the local priests. Staugaitis then selected his vicar general Pranas Urbonavičius as the acting deputy.

The Diocese of Warmia continued to have influence in the region. For example, priests contributed to the diocese's pension fund and attended recollections in Stoczek or Braniewo. The last two priests from Warmia, educated at Collegium Hosianum, were appointed to the diocese in 1927 and 1930. On a couple of occasions, the bishop of Warmia was asked to send new priests to the prelature, however it was refused due to the shortage of priests and because priests could not be compelled to work outside of the diocese. The German Ministry of Foreign Affairs suggested that the Diocese of Telšiai sent priests to be educated in Warmia.

==== Catholic growth ====
In the interwar, due to immigration of Catholics from Lithuania proper, the number of Catholics grew and new churches were constructed in Pagėgiai, Priekulė, Plikiai, and Smalininkai. In 1936, Lithuanians started raising fund for the construction of a new Catholic church in Klaipėda. The construction committee, chaired by the former prime minister Ernestas Galvanauskas, purchased land in Smeltė and selected a project by the engineer Adolfas Lukošaitis. However, due to the unstable international situation, the construction did not begin.

In 1939, the prelature had 13 priests (four Germans and nine Lithuanians), five parishes, eight churches, and about 25,000 Catholics. Five of the Lithuanian priests were new graduates of the Telšiai Seminary. No Catholic schools or monasteries were established in the prelature, though Sisters of Saint Elizabeth had plans to move into the region and the Jesuits were offered a house in Klaipėda by a Lithuanian American priest.

==== Lithuanian–German relations ====
There were tensions and disagreements between the Catholics from Prussia and Lithuania not only due to language differences (German vs. Lithuanian), but also due to differences in practice and traditions – for example, different holidays, the role played by the parishioners in parish affairs, attitude towards Lutherans. Starting in 1930, prelature's priests organized conferences to discuss issues specific the region.

Relations between Germans and Lithuanians became more tense as Hitler rose to power in the early 1930s. Lithuania attempted to counter German influence in the region by, among other things, providing funding for the construction of new Catholic churches and expelling priests who were not loyal to Lithuania. In September 1934, governor of Klaipėda Jonas Navakas expelled nine Lutheran priests and the Catholic pastor of Viešvilė for not speaking Lithuanian.

New churches were mainly initiated by Albert Dannelautzki, but he was gradually removed from construction committees. In 1933, marking his 25th anniversary of service, Dannelautzki was awarded the honorary title of prelate. At the same time, the Holy See reserved the right to appoint his successor thus preempting any effort of removing him. However, in fall 1933, Dannelautzki requested a position in the Diocese of Warmia. The bishop discussed the issue with the German Ministry of Science, Art, and Education and rejected Dannelautzki's request as his position in Klaipėda was deemed to be essential.

=== World War II and after ===
When Lithuania lost the region to Nazi Germany in March 1939, the Holy See appointed Maximilian Kaller, bishop of Warmia, as the acting administrator of the prelature on 10 June 1939. Kaller chose Dannelautzki as vicar general. By May 1939, five Lithuanian priests remained in the region and received wages from the Lithuanian government. Lithuanian priests were persecuted by the Nazis and only two priests avoided arrests. After the war, most of the original populations of the region fled or was expelled and was replaced by new immigrants. The prelature returned to the administration of the bishop of Telšiai.

During the Soviet era, Christians faced persecution and Catholic activities in the prelature were limited. During World War II, most churches in Klaipėda city were destroyed leaving the Church of Christ the King as the only functioning Catholic church in the city. Due to post-war migration, the number of Catholics grew substantially and reached estimated 30,000 by 1956. After the death of Joseph Stalin, permission for a construction of a new Catholic church was granted. The Church of Mary, Queen of Peace, was completed in 1961 but the Soviets confiscated it and turned into a philharmonic. This left the small Church of Christ the King as the only Catholic church in the city until 1988.

In 1974, the prelature had 10 churches in Klaipėda, Šilutė, Ropkojai, Viešvilė, Pagėgiai, Plikiai, Smalininkai, Rukai, Saugos, and Vilkyškiai. The new post-war churches were not purpose-built. Rukai used an existing Lutheran church; Saugos used a Lutheran chapel; Vilkyškiai used a converted personal residence.

=== Disestablishment ===
In 1958, the Diocese of Telšiai was reorganized into 10 deaneries, including two (Klaipėda and Šilutė) which had centers in the prelature. The prelature was officially disestablished and became part of the Diocese of Telšiai on 24 December 1991 after Lithuania regained independence from the Soviet Union.

== Prelates and apostolic administrator ==
- 1926–1939: Justinas Staugaitis, prelate
- 1939–1949: sede vacante
  - 1939–1947: Maximilian Kaller, apostolic administrator
- 1949–1966: Petras Maželis, prelate
- 1967–1975: Juozapas Pletkus, prelate
- 1975–1991: Antanas Vaičius, prelate

== Bibliography ==
- Jodkowski, Marek (2018). "Z badań nad duchowieństwem warmińskim w udzielnej prałaturze kłajpedzkiej w latach 1926–1939" (PDF). Studia Elbląskie (in Polish). 19: 119–133.
- Kopiczko, Andrzej (2015). "Die Katholische Kirche in Memelland (1923–1939)". Acta historica universitatis Klaipedensis (in German). 30: 101–125. ISSN 2351-6526.
- Streikus, Arūnas (2012). "Klaipėdos krašto katalikų integravimas į Lietuvos bažnytinę provinciją 1926–1939 m." (PDF). Bažnyčios istorijos studijos. 5: 343–370. ISSN 1392-0502.
