= Vincentas Borisevičius =

Lithuanian Roman Catholic bishop (1887–1946)

- Bishop of Telšiai
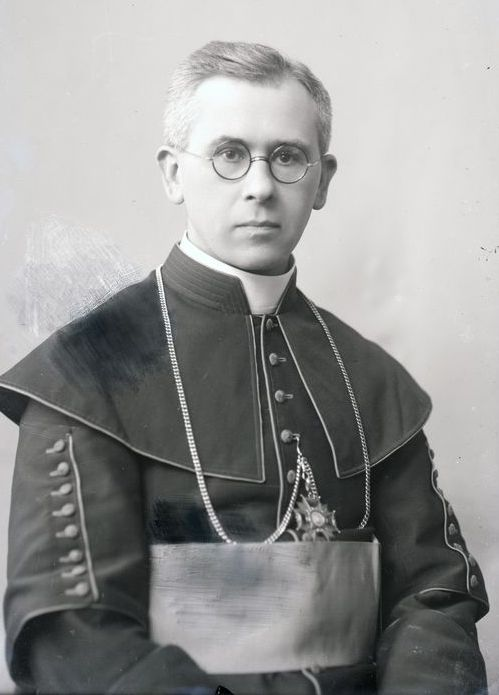
- Church: Roman Catholic Church
- Diocese: Diocese of Telšiai
- Installed: 21 January 1944
- Term ended: 18 November 1946
- Predecessor: Justinas Staugaitis
- Successor: Petras Maželis

Orders
- Ordination: 29 May 1910
- Consecration: 10 March 1940

Personal details
- Born: 23 November 1887 Bebrininkai, Suwałki Governorate, Congress Poland
- Died: 18 November 1946 (aged 58) Vilnius, Lithuanian SSR
- Buried: Tuskulėnai Manor; Telšiai Cathedral (reburied)
- Denomination: Roman Catholic
- Education: Sejny Priest Seminary; University of Fribourg

Vincentas Borisevičius (23 November 1887 – 18 November 1946) was a Lithuanian Roman Catholic bishop of the Telšiai Diocese. The process of his beatification was initiated in 1990.

Born to a family of well-off Lithuanian farmers, Borisevičius was educated at the boys' gymnasium of the Church of St. Catherine in Saint Petersburg, Sejny Priest Seminary, and University of Fribourg in Switzerland. In 1913, he became a vicar and prison chaplain to Kalvarija. During World War I, he evacuated to Minsk where he worked as a chaplain of the 10th Army of the Russian Imperial Army. Upon return to Lithuania in 1918, he became chaplain and religion teacher at the Marijampolė Gymnasium. In 1922, he moved to teach moral and pastoral theology as well as social sciences at the Sejny Priest Seminary. In 1926, Justinas Staugaitis, the first bishop of the newly created Diocese of Telšiai, invited Borisevičius to help him organize the diocese and the new priest seminary in Telšiai. The seminary was officially opened on 4 October 1927 and Borisevičius was its rector until it was closed in 1940 in the aftermath of the Soviet occupation of Lithuania. In 1940, he became auxiliary bishop of Telšiai and a titular bishop of Lysias. After the death of Bishop Staugaitis on 7 July 1943, Borisevičius succeeded him as the new bishop of Telšiai.

Accused of various anti-Soviet activities, including supporting Lithuanian partisans, Borisevičius was arrested by the NKVD in December 1945 and again in February 1946. On 28 August, he was convicted of being a traitor under Article 58 of the Soviet Penal Code and sentenced to death. He was executed in November 1946 and buried in a mass grave at the Tuskulėnai Manor in Vilnius. His remains were found in 1996 and were reburied at the Telšiai Cathedral in 1999.

== Biography ==
=== Early life and education ===
Borisevičius was born in the village of Bebrininkai situated on the banks of the Šešupė river and located near Pilviškiai. His parents were well-off Lithuanian farmers and owned about 40 hectares (99 acres) of land. His family had thirteen children, but only nine (four sons and five daughters) reached adulthood. After his mother's death in 1894, Borisevičius was raised by his elder sister Ona. In 1893–1897, he attended a Russian primary school in Šunskai. After the graduation, he was sent to a boys' gymnasium of the Church of St. Catherine in Saint Petersburg which was attended by his older brother Kazimieras. In September 1903, Borisevičius and his brother Kazimieras enrolled into the Sejny Priest Seminary. After three months of study, due to poor health, Borisevičius had to delay the studies for a year. He graduated in 1909 but was still too young to be ordained as a priest. Therefore, he was ordained as a deacon and was sent for further studies to the University of Fribourg in Switzerland by bishop Antanas Karosas of the Diocese of Sejny. He received a 300-ruble stipend from the Motinėlė Society. He graduated with a licentiate after defending his thesis that Jesus Christ is God. He was ordained as a priest on 29 May 1910 in Sejny. He could not pursue further studies for a doctorate due to poor health. He returned to Lithuania and held his first mass in Šunskai.

=== Priest and teacher ===
In spring 1913, Borisevičius was posted as a vicar and prison chaplain to Kalvarija. During World War I, when Germans briefly captured Kalvarija, Borisevičius was taken as a hostage and later faced Russian inquiries for collecting German-imposed contributions. Later, he and his family evacuated to Minsk where he sheltered three seminary students. In 1916–1917, he worked as a chaplain of the 10th Army of the Russian Imperial Army. In June 1917, he as a representative of the Lithuanian Christian Democratic Party participated in the Petrograd Seimas. In Minsk, he organized financial aid for Lithuanian students and received a silver tableware set from Madeleine Radziwiłł worth 30,000 rubles which became the basis for the charitable fund of the Catholic youth federation Ateitis and was later used to finance the construction of its headquarters in Kaunas. When Minsk was captured by the Germans, he briefly worked as a theology teacher at a Gymnasium in Minsk.

In 1918, he returned to Lithuania and in September became chaplain of Marijampolė Gymnasium. In April 1919, he also became chaplain of the Marijampolė Realgymnasium, established by Andrius Bulota. The Realgymnasium promoted socialism and supported a group of Aušrininkai and thus was averse to the Catholic Church. Due to the hostile anti-religious atmosphere and attitudes, both from students and administration, Borisevičius resigned from the Realgymnasium in June 1919. He continued to teach at the Marijampolė Gymnasium until spring 1922 when he was reassigned to teach at the Sejny Priest Seminary. He cared for his students, supporting struggling students financially or with additional lessons and overseeing a dormitory of the Žiburys Society. He also supported the Lithuanian Christian Democratic Party and agitated people to vote in the elections to the Constituent Assembly of Lithuania. In 1920, he was elected to the Marijampolė city council where he served as a secretary and, for three months, chairman.

In fall 1921, Borisevičius traveled back to Fribourg to deal with his unfinished studies and returned in spring 1922. At that time, he was reassigned to teach moral and pastoral theology as well as social sciences at the Sejny Priest Seminary which expelled from Sejny operated from Gižai. He was also active in local chapters of Catholic organizations, including the Lithuanian Catholic Women's Organization and youth union Pavasaris.

=== Rector in Telšiai ===
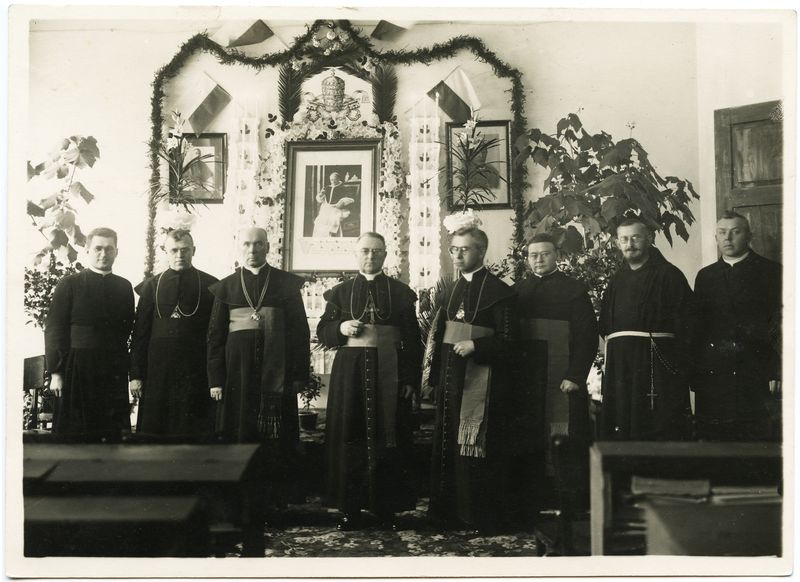
Bishop Staugaitis (fourth from left) and Borisevičius (fifth from left) at the Telšiai Priest Seminary in 1930

In 1926, as part of a broader reorganization of Lithuanian dioceses by Pope Pius XI, Justinas Staugaitis became the first bishop of the newly created Diocese of Telšiai. Staugaitis organized the new diocese and invited Borisevičius to become his vicar general and later the first rector of the new priest seminary in Telšiai. The seminary was officially opened on 4 October 1927. He later constructed a new three-floor building for the seminary. He also taught moral theology based on the writings of Adolphe Tanquerey. His goal was not to prepare academics, but priests for practical work among the people. He addressed the students every day for about 15 minutes before lunch emphasizing piousness, devotion to God, discipline, morality. According to his students, he was scrupulous, almost a perfectionist, who wanted to quickly transform the clerics to perfect priests. He strictly enforced the discipline, insisted on showing proper respect to superiors, and was not hesitant to expel the students for "lack of calling". He remained rector until 1940 when the seminary was closed in the aftermath of the Soviet occupation in June 1940.

On 16 February 1928, Borisevičius was elevated to prelates by the pope. He participated in the congresses of the Lithuanian Catholic Academy of Science, chairing their theology section in 1936 and 1939 and presented papers on Lithuanian religious character and on moral virtues in writings of bishop Motiejus Valančius. He also contributed articles to various Lithuanian Catholic periodicals, including Vadovas, Šaltinis, Žiburys, Laisvė, Rytas, Spauda ir gyvenimas, Žemaičių prietelius, Ateitis, but mostly to Tiesos kelias. Staugaitis and Borisevičius purchased printing presses so that the diocese could more easily publish its periodicals. He was a member of the Society of Saint Vincent de Paul that helped the poor and a strong supporter of the Catholic Action movement.

=== Bishop and execution ===
On 3 February 1940, he was appointed as an auxiliary bishop of Telšiai and as a titular bishop of Lysias. He was consecrated on 10 March in Telšiai Cathedral by bishops Staugaitis of Telšiai, Kazimieras Paltarokas of Panevėžys, and Juozapas Kukta of Kaišiadorys. Bishop Staugaitis died on 7 July 1943 and Pope Pius XII appointed Borisevičius as the new bishop on 21 January 1944. He officially took over the diocese on 4 March. During his later Soviet trial, three Jews testified that he helped Jews to hide from the Holocaust. When in mid 1944, as a result of the Baltic Offensive, Red Army took control of most of Lithuania, Borisevičius refused to follow the example many other Lithuanian members of the clergy and intelligentsia and retreat to the West escaping future communist persecutions. He remained in Telšiai.

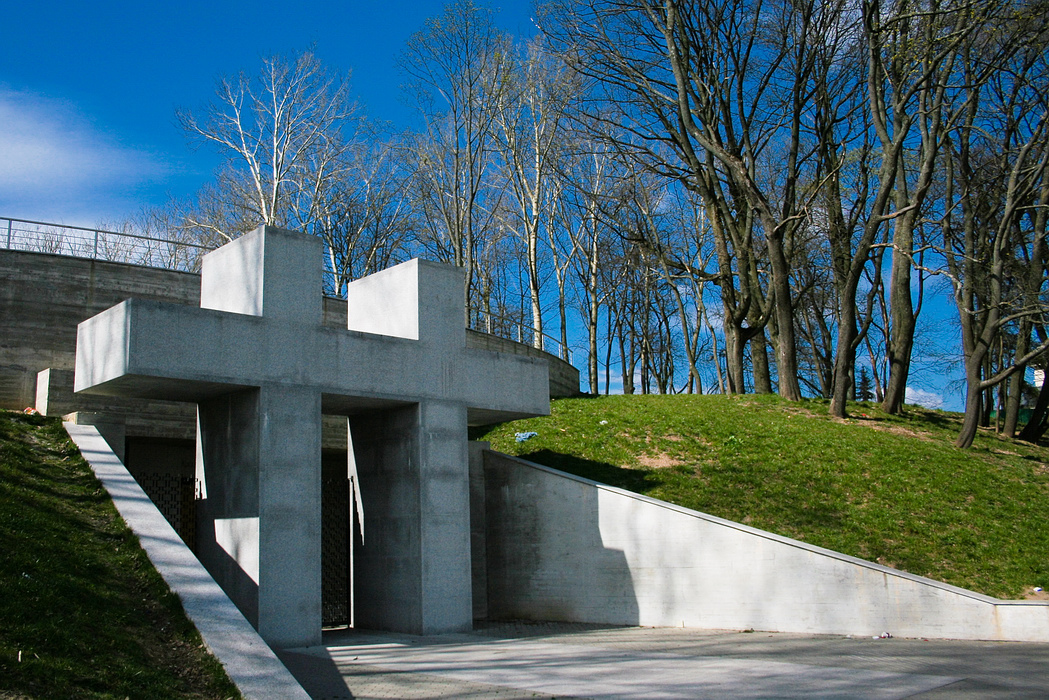
Memorial to Soviet victims in Tuskulėnai Manor

Already in April 1945, even before the war was over, NKVD arrested Adolfas Kubilius, commander of the Samogitian Legion (a military unit of the Lithuanian Liberty Army), who provided information on the legion, its members, and support received from Borisevičius. Bishop Borisevičius was first arrested on 18 December 1945, but released six days later. He was offered a deal – cooperate with Soviet authorities in exchange for a pardon, but, after a discussion with Archbishop Mečislovas Reinys, he refused. This discussion was later listed as one of the "crimes" in Reinys' trial. On 3 January, Borisevičius sent a letter to NKGB listing examples of how he had helped Jews, communists, and Soviet POWs and citing John 10:11 (The good shepherd gives His life for the sheep) to explain his refusal to cooperate. He was arrested again on 5 February 1946 and kept in the prison at the NKVD headquarters in Vilnius (present-day Museum of Occupations and Freedom Fights). Borisevičius was accused by the NKVD of delivering anti-Soviet sermons in 1940–1941, keeping two anti-Soviet books (including an eyewitness account of the Chervyen massacre by Jonas Petruitis), publishing an anti-Soviet proclamation in 1943, supporting the Samogitian Legion and helping two of its leaders (Eduardus Misevičius and Šarūnas Jazdauskas) hide from Soviet authorities, providing Lithuanian partisans with fake papers, and helping a German paratrooper transmit a radiogram to Germany. On 28 August, he was convicted of being a traitor under Article 58 of the Soviet Penal Code and sentenced to death. After the trial, he was imprisoned in Lukiškės Prison. There is no direct evidence, but it is believed that the sentence was carried out on 18 November 1946 with twelve others.

Borisevičius was buried in a mass grave in Tuskulėnai Manor in Vilnius. His remains were located and identified in summer 1996. On 27 September 1999, his remains were reburied in Telšiai Cathedral. At the same time, remains of Pranas Gustaitis, dean of Viešvėnai executed with Borisevičius, were reburied in the churchyard of Viešvėnai. Three days earlier, Borisevičius was posthumously awarded the Order of the Cross of Vytis (2nd degree). The Telšiai Bishop Vincentas Borisevičius Priest Seminary was renamed in his honor in 2002, as well as a street in Kazlų Rūda in 1995. In February 1990, Lithuanians initiated the beatification case of Borisevičius and archbishops Teofilius Matulionis and Mečislovas Reinys, who were also repressed by the Soviets.

== Bibliography ==
- Andrijauskaitė, Ugnė Marija (2013). Aušrininkų organizacija 1910-1938 m. (PDF) (Master's thesis) (in Lithuanian). Kaunas: Vytautas Magnus University.
- Baltinis, Andrius (1975). Vyskupo Vincento Borisevičiaus gyvenimas ir darbai (PDF) (in Lithuanian). Rome: Lithuanian Catholic Academy of Science. OCLC 955441798.
- Biržiška, Vaclovas, ed. (1954). "Borisevičius, Vincentas". Lietuvių enciklopedija (in Lithuanian). Vol. 3. Lietuvių enciklopedijos leidykla. OCLC 977068241.
- Černius, Remigijus (November 2016). "Vincentas Borisevičius 1887 11 23–1946 11 18" (PDF). Atmintinos datos (in Lithuanian). Genocide and Resistance Research Centre of Lithuania.
- Katilius, Algimantas (2006). "Kauniečių "Motinėlės" draugija Kaune". Kauno istorijos metraštis (in Lithuanian). 7. ISSN 2335-8734.
- Stancikas, Dalius; Bogomolovaitė, Inga (1994). "Vyskupo Vincento Borisevičiaus tardymas ir žūtis". Laisvės kovų archyvas (in Lithuanian). 11. ISSN 1392-0421.
- Streikus, Arūnas, ed. (2000). Lietuvos vyskupai kankiniai sovietiniame teisme (PDF) (in Lithuanian). Lithuanian Catholic Academy of Science. ISBN 9986-592-28-3.
- Urbanavičiūtė-Jonaitienė, Danguolė (11 May 2012). "Apie vyskupo kankinio gyvenimą ir likimą. Prisimenant Telšių vyskupą Vincentą Borisevičių". XXI amžius (in Lithuanian). 19 (1994). ISSN 2029-1299. Archived from the original on 19 June 2021.
- Vasiliauskienė, Aldona (2003). "LKMA genezės aspektai". Lietuvių katalikų mokslo akademijos metraštis (in Lithuanian). 22. ISSN 1392-0502.
