= Telšiai Priest Seminary =

Roman Catholic seminary in Lithuania

Coordinates: 55°58′54″N 22°14′45″E

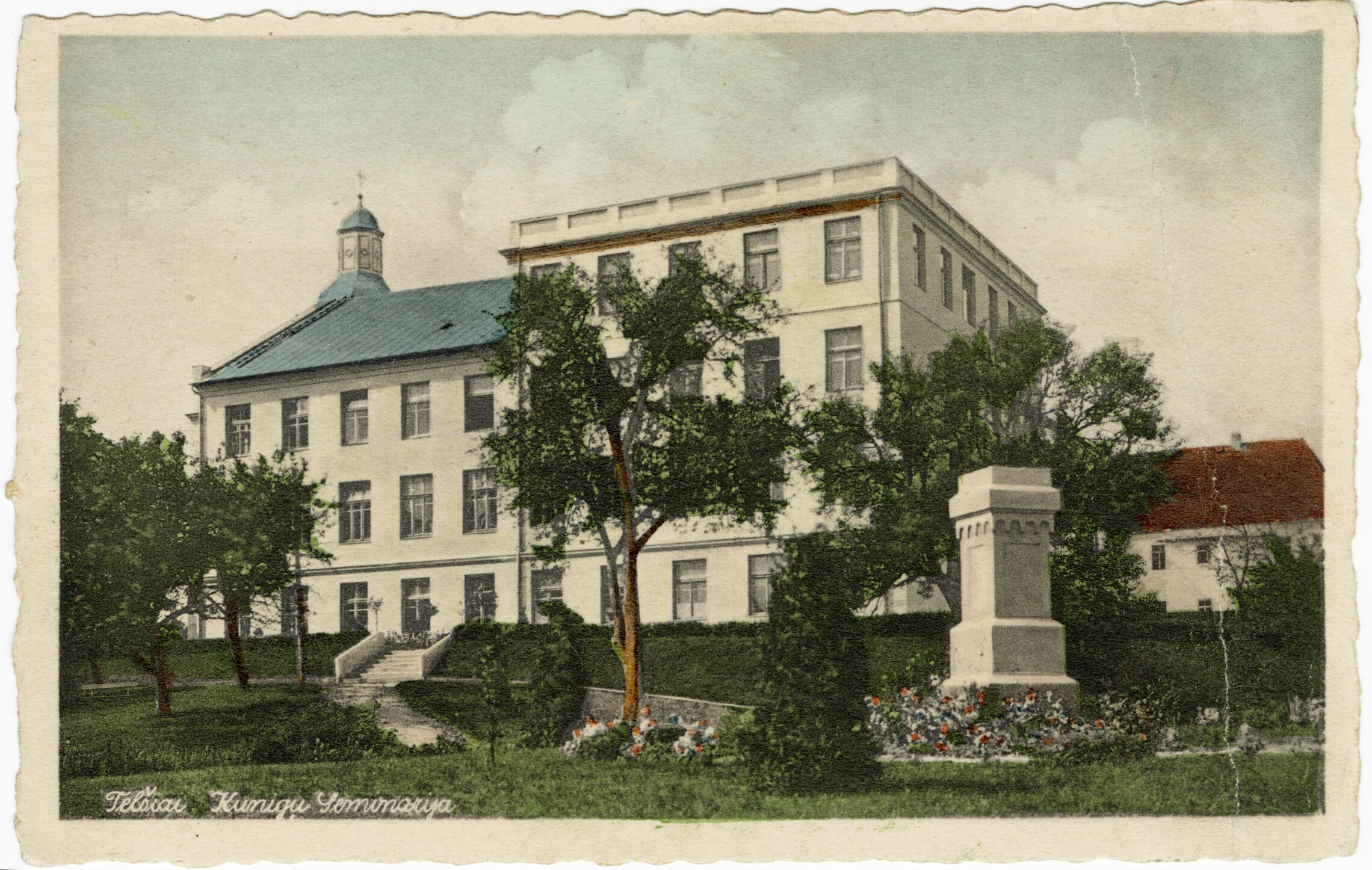
Seminary premises in Telšiai (interwar postcard)

Telšiai Bishop Vincentas Borisevičius Priest Seminary (Lithuanian: Telšių Vyskupo Vincento Borisevičiaus kunigų seminarija) is a former Roman Catholic seminary in Telšiai, Lithuania. It was founded in 1927 by Justinas Staugaitis, the first bishop of Telšiai. It was closed in 1946 by Soviet authorities. By that time, it educated about 150 priests. The seminary was reestablished in 1989 and recognized as a private university in 2000. In 2020, the seminary was reorganized to offer only one-year propaedeutic course. Therefore, it lost its accreditation in 2021.

== History ==
=== Establishment ===
The Diocese of Telšiai was established by the papal bull Lithuanorum Gente issued on 4 April 1926. Its first bishop Justinas Staugaitis quickly became concerned with the lack of priests in the diocese. Kaunas Priest Seminary had only 26 Samogitian seminarians who were expected to return to work in the diocese. According to canon law (since the Council of Trent) and the Concordat of 1927, each diocese is obliged to have its own priest seminary. Staugaitis pursued the idea of a seminary despite critics who pointed out lack of funds and qualified teachers.

Staugaitis announced the new seminary on 5 June 1927. It was officially opened on 4 October 1927 (98 years ago) with 41 students. Vincentas Borisevičius became the first rector of the seminary (he later became the second bishop of Telšiai). Initially, it was a minor seminary or lyceum which provided secondary education to students interested in priesthood. Plans for a major seminary (seminarium maius) were opposed by prime minister Augustinas Voldemaras who appealed to the Holy See hoping to limit the number of priest seminaries in Lithuania to two (Kaunas and Vilkaviškis). The Holy See agreed if each diocese could have a minor seminary or "two-year preparatory theological school". However, Staugaitis persisted and elevated the seminary to a major seminary in 1929.

=== Interwar ===
Number of students
Year	Students
1927/1928	43
1929	87
1930	94
1931	108
1932	112
1933	118
1934	118
1935	122
1936	97
1937	69
1938	61
1939	85
1940	83

Because seminary's curriculum was equivalent to that of a public school, the diocese requested funding from the Lithuanian government, but the ruling Lithuanian Nationalist Union was not favorable to the Catholic church and refused the requests until 1930. That year, the government agreed to pay salaries to teachers, but not those teaching religious or theological subjects. The government also did not recognize theological degrees granted by the seminary. In his memoirs, Staugaitis described an incident where Steponas Rusteika, minister of internal affairs, attempted to install an agent at the seminary and provoke one seminarian to write a paper criticizing president Antanas Smetona. In another incident, two of seminary's lecturers were accused of delivering anti-government lectures.

To get more qualified teachers for the seminary, bishop Staugaitis sent several priests to be educated in Rome. According to available data, 26 priests taught in pre-war seminary, including bishop Pranciškus Būčys, future bishops Vincentas Borisevičius and Petras Maželis, future diocese administrator Justinas Juodaitis, and former Lithuanian representative in Vatican Jurgis Narjauskas. A papal representative inspected the seminary in 1938 and reported that students were exemplary in religiosity and studiousness, but teachers had other jobs and commitments thus were not always able to properly prepare for lectures.

Initially, the education lasted four years. By 1935, the education lasted seven years – two years of high school, one year of philosophy, and four years of theology. The seminary had a library (10,000 books in 1932) and a physics laboratory. Tuition, including room and board, cost 450 litas per year. The first nine priests were ordained on 12 June 1932. The number of students varied; the highest enrollment was 122 in 1934/35. Before World War II, the seminary graduated 118 priests.

The seminary owned two plots of land – 70 hectares (170 acres) in the former Džiuginėnai folwark and 40 hectares (99 acres) of the former parish church returned from the Eastern Orthodox Church. The land was used for farming that provided revenue and foodstuffs to the seminary. The farms were improved by installing drainage, planting an orchard, building a greenhouse, repairing and building new farm buildings.

=== World War II ===
After the Soviet occupation in 1940, the seminary was closed. Its building was converted into a military hospital of the Red Army. The seminarians were moved to Kaunas Priest Seminary. After the German invasion of the Soviet Union, the seminary reopened on 15 September 1941 with 67 students. In 1943, Germans raided the seminary and arrested priest Pranciškus Baltrumas for slaughtering pigs without a permit. In fall 1943, Germans established a hospital in the seminary building forcing students to find other accommodation.

In fall 1944, the frontline reached Telšiai. Several professors and 44 seminarians retreated west. Some of them continued studies at Collegium Willibaldinum in Eichstätt. The remaining seminarians resumed studies in Telšiai in January 1945. In September 1945, the seminary was visited by Mečislovas Gedvilas, Chairman of the Council of People's Commissars of the Lithuanian SSR. He declared that the seminary was closed and seminarians would be transferred to Kaunas, but agreed to allow the completion of the school year in Telšiai. The seminary was officially closed on 15 June 1946. By that time, it had consecrated about 150 priests.

=== Post-Soviet ===
Number of students
Year	Students
1989/1990	22
1990/1991	32
1991/1992	69 + 3 in Rome
1992/1993	86 + 3 in Rome
1993/1994	82 + 3 in Rome
1994/1995	71 + 2 in Rome
1995/1996	56 + 3 in Rome
1996/1997	55 + 3 in Rome
1997/1998	54 + 1 in Rome
1998/1999	57 + 1 in Rome
1999/2000	54 + 2 in Rome
2000/2001	58 + 2 in Rome
2001/2002	59 + 1 in Rome
2002/2003	63 + 1 in Rome
2003/2004	41
2004/2005	49
2005/2006	37
2006/2007	33
2007/2008	27
2008/2009	24
2009/2010	29
2010/2011	28
2011/2012	24
2013	18
2018	9

The seminary in Telšiai was re-established in 1989 by bishop Antanas Vaičius. It opened on 1 September 1989 with 22 students. Before 1995, education lasted five years (one year of philosophy and four years of theology). In 1995, the course was extended to six years by adding additional year for philosophy. In 2000, the seminary was recognized as a university which granted bachelor's and master's degrees. The seminary was renamed after its first rector Vincentas Borisevičius on 23 November 2002 (his 115th birth anniversary).

In 1994, the diocese reestablished the minor seminary, known as Lyceum of the Diocese of Telšiai (Telšių vyskupijos licėjus), which provided the last three (from 1999, the last two) years of secondary education. The government recognized the school three years later. By 2005, 79 students graduated from the lyceum.

In March 2003, Lithuanian bishops decided to establish a required one-year propaedeutic course so that aspiring priests could explore their calling and better understand the mission of a priest. The course was established at the former monastery Žemaičių Kalvarija. To further strengthen education, in 2009, the seminary was attached to the Pontifical Lateran University so that seminary graduates could easily continue their education in Rome.

In 2011, the seminary had 32 teachers, including 22 priests. Of the teachers, 13 had doctorate degrees. Additionally, there were seven doctorate students in Rome. By 2011, the seminary graduated 113 priest and one deacon, of which 59 received master's degrees. By 2019, the seminary ordained 126 priests and two deacons.

In summer 2020, Lithuanian bishops decided to reorganize the priest seminaries in Lithuania. Each of the three seminaries became responsible for a different stage of education – Telšiai Seminary for the propaedeutic course, Kaunas Seminary for the two-year philosophy education, and Vilnius Seminary for the four-year theology course. As a result, the seminary lost the accreditation for its religion study program in 2021 and as of the 2021/22 school year is not organizing any tertiary education studies. It then lost its status of an educational institution in April 2025. In the 2024/25 school year, it had seven students in the propaedeutic class.

== Seminary's building ==
At first, the seminary used the western wing of the former Bernardine monastery. The eastern wing was derelict and needed repairs that cost 73,780 litas. Staugaitis initiated the construction of a new seminary building based on a project by the architect Povilas Taračkovas. The construction cost was estimated at 351,214 litas. Diocese's priests raised 164,000 litas and the congregation raised 84,000 litas. Additional funds were raised by Juozapas Valaitis who toured various communities of Lithuanian Americans and collected about $40,000 in two years. The government did not provide cash, but supplied timber.

The construction started in May 1928 and was completed in six months. The new building was consecrated on 16 December 1928. It was built on a hill offering views of the city. It had four floors on the northern half, and three floors on the southern half. It was equipped with central heating and plumbing. It had three large halls for meetings and 40 rooms. The ground floor had a chapel with a sacristy. By 1939, the seminary outgrew the premises but reconstruction plans were interrupted by the outbreak of World War II.

After the war, the building was nationalized and, at various times, used for offices of a local newspaper, teacher's seminary, and school for the deaf. The building was reconstructed when the seminary reopened, but it is criticized for not matching architectural style of the older buildings in the complex. In 2023, the seminary had 82 residential rooms, but most of them were vacant due to the declining student enrollment. As a result, the seminary started offering the rooms to tourists and other visitors. The building also houses an exposition of sacral heritage of the Samogitian Museum Alka.

== Rectors ==
Seminary's rectors were:

- 1927–1940 – Vincentas Borisevičius
- 1940–1946 – Pranciškus Ramanauskas
- 1946–1989 – Seminary was closed
- 1989–1993 – Kazimieras Gasčiūnas
- 1996–1997 – Steponas Brazdeikis
- 1997–2003 – Algis Genutis
- 2003–2006 – Antanas Lapė
- 2006–2008 – Vygintas Gūdeliūnas
- 2008–2011 – Jonas Ačas
- 2011–2015 – Viktoras Ačas
- 2015–2018 – Ramūnas Norkus
- 2018–2022 – Saulius Stumbra

== Bibliography ==
- Ačas, Viktoras; Ačas, Jonas (2011). "Telšių kunigų seminarijos įsteigimas ir jos raida iki šių dienų" (PDF). Tiltai. priedas (in Lithuanian). 42: 101–124. ISSN 1648-3979.
- Brazdeikis, Vytautas Steponas (2011). "Telšių mažoji kunigų seminarija". Tiltai. priedas (in Lithuanian). 42: 125–138. ISSN 1648-3979.
- Butrimas, Adomas (2008). Telšiai: sakralinis kompleksas Insulos kalvoje. Telšiai: the Sacral Ensemble on Insula Hill. Vilniaus dailės akademijos leidykla. ISBN 978-9955-854-02-9.
- Gasanovas, Orijus (14 August 2023). "Lietuviams siūloma neeilinė patirtis: naktį galima praleisti kunigo lovoje". Delfi.lt (in Lithuanian).
- Servienė, Aurelija (26 March 2021). "Telšių kunigų seminarijos istorija sugulė į knygą". Telšių žinios (in Lithuanian).
- Staugaitis, Justinas (2006). Mano atsiminimai (in Lithuanian) (2nd ed.). Vilnius: Katalikų akademija. ISBN 9986592534.
- Vaitekūnas, Stasys (2011). Justinas Staugaitis: vyskupas, politikas, tautos dvasios ir valstybės puoselėtojas (in Lithuanian). Vilnius: Mokslo ir enciklopedijų leidybos centras. ISBN 9785420016923.
