= Telšiai Bernardine Monastery =

Monastery in Telšiai, Lithuania

Telšiai Bernardine monastery and seminary building complex
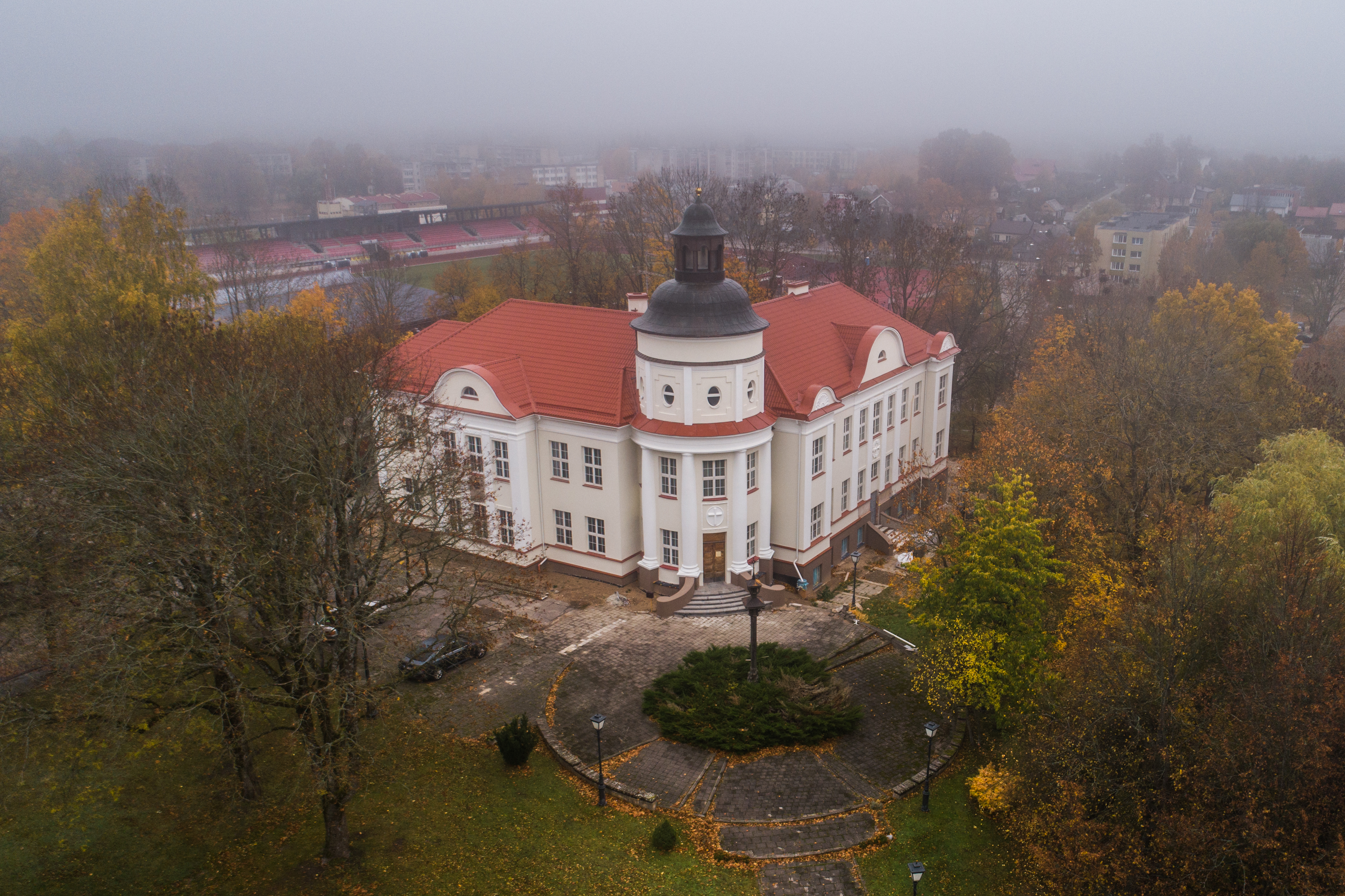
- Interactive map of the Telšiai Bernardine monastery and seminary building complex area

General information
- Type: Bernardine monastery, cathedral and the seminary
- Location: Telšiai, Lithuania
- Coordinates: 55.982154°N 22.246237°E

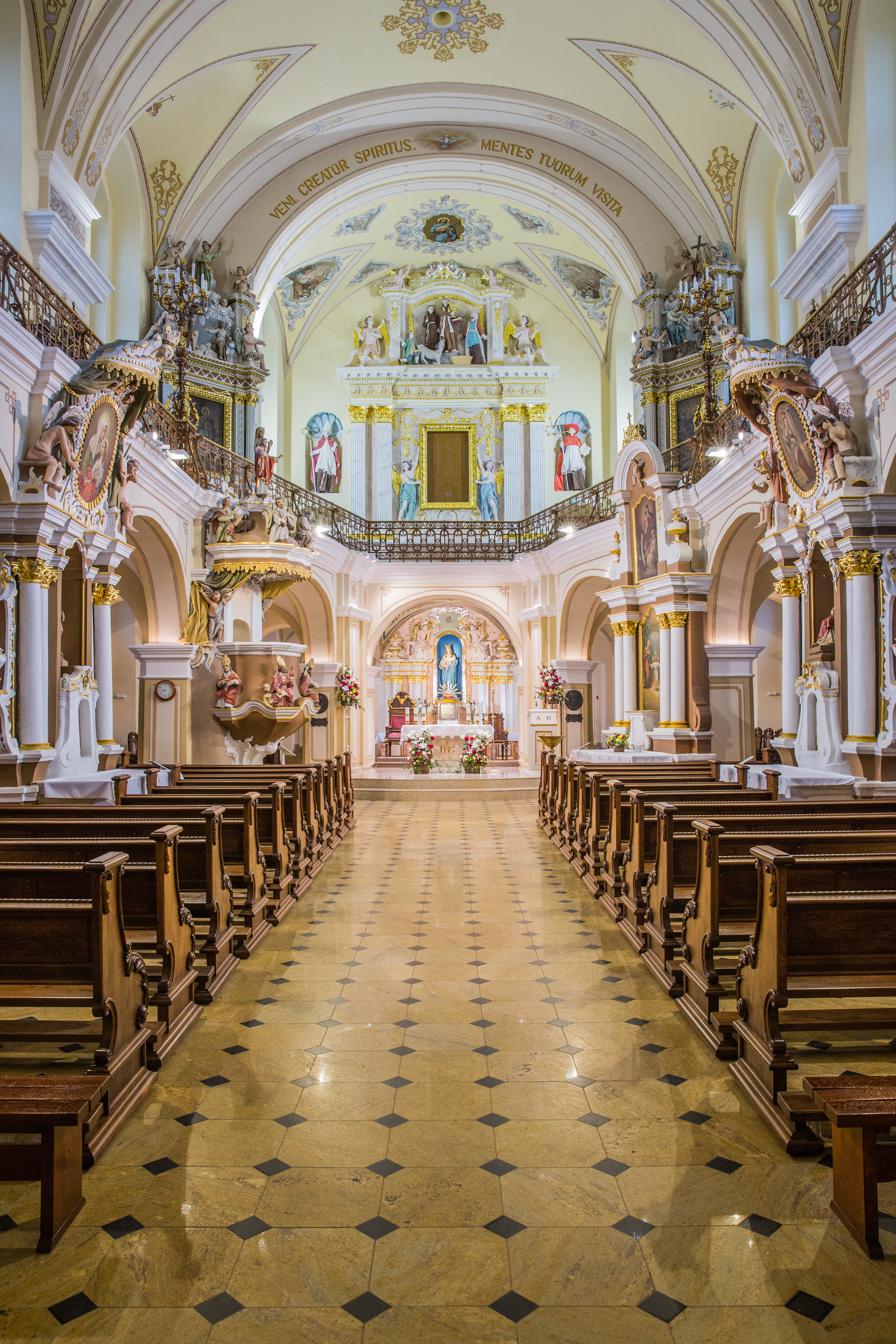
Interior of the cathedral

Telšiai Bernardine monastery and seminary complex is a monastery in Lithuania. It is one of the most important sacred buildings in the region of Samogitia.

== Location ==
It stands on the northern shore of Lake Mastis, upon the hill of Insula.

== History ==
The buildings rose for the first time in the 17th century. The complex comprises the Bernardine monastery and church (which in 1926 became a cathedral), the seminary, the Episcopal palace, school and other buildings.

The establishment of a Bernardine monastery in Telšiai was initiated by a Telšiai elder, Lithuanian Grand Duchy chancellor Povilas Sapiega along with his wife Kotryna - Goslauskaitė-Valavičienė Sapiegienė. Confirmation was received from Sigismund III Vasa, monarch of the united Polish-Lithuanian Commonwealth. At first a small wooden, later masonry, monastery was built. At the end of the 17th century a Loreto holy house was built, - the northernmost holy house devoted to Loreto Mary, mother of Jesus. The monks prayed there until 1748, until the church that was built nearby was consecrated.

In the middle of the 18th century Telšiai was rebuilt after the Great Northern War, plague and famine, that took place at the beginning of that century. With the significance of the city increasing through the initiative of Lithuanian Bernardine provincial superior father Pranciškus Samavičius and Telšiai Bernardine monastery abbot Pranciškus Kašutis, the construction of the masonry church was begun. The construction was funded by the majority of Samogitia's noblemen. The construction of the church was completed in 1791, and it was consecrated in 1794.

The renaissance-classicist style altar was dedicated to St. Anthony's (1195-1231), one of the best-known saints in Samogitia.

In 1793, through the efforts of the Bernardine monks a three-year district school was opened, which became a grammar school in 1831. In 1868 by the instruction of Curator of Education in Vilnius the school was closed.

In 1853 due to the Russian government's anti-Catholic policies the Bernardine monastery was closed as well. A part of the monastery became a parsonage, the church became a Telšiai city parish church, and the priests, parish priests. In the 19th century a tower was built in the middle of the church, which due to an unreliable structure had to be demolished and a new one built of half its size. The church was restored on two occasions in 1897–1898, when a metal gallery surrounding the whole second floor with lanterns was erected, and historic style masonry churchyard gates were built.

On 4 April 1926, Pope Pius XI issued an apostolic constitution “Lituanorum gente“ which established the Lithuanian church province and Telšiai diocese. Justinas Staugaitis (1866-1943), a prominent church and Lithuanian government figure, was chosen as the first bishop of Telšiai. It was thanks to his efforts that in 1927 the seminary was reopened at the monastery, and in 1929 a seminary annex was built. The episcopal palace was built in 1929–1930.

In 1940, Vincentas Borisevičius was consecrated as bishop in Telšiai diocese cathedral. On 5 February 1946 he was arrested by the officials of the Soviet government, tortured and executed in Vilnius on 18 November 1946. His remains were discovered in Tuskulėnai and in 1999 reburied in the cathedral of St. Anthony in the bishop's crypt. His canonisation case was opened.

The renovation of the cathedral was conducted in preparation for the 600th anniversary of the Christianisation of Lithuania and Samogitia. The doors of the church were decorated with copper plates representing the development of Christianity in Samogitia, the churchyard gates were adorned by the statues of St. Anthony, the patron of the cathedral and St. Stanislaus of Szczepanów, the patron of Telšiai city.

== Gallery ==
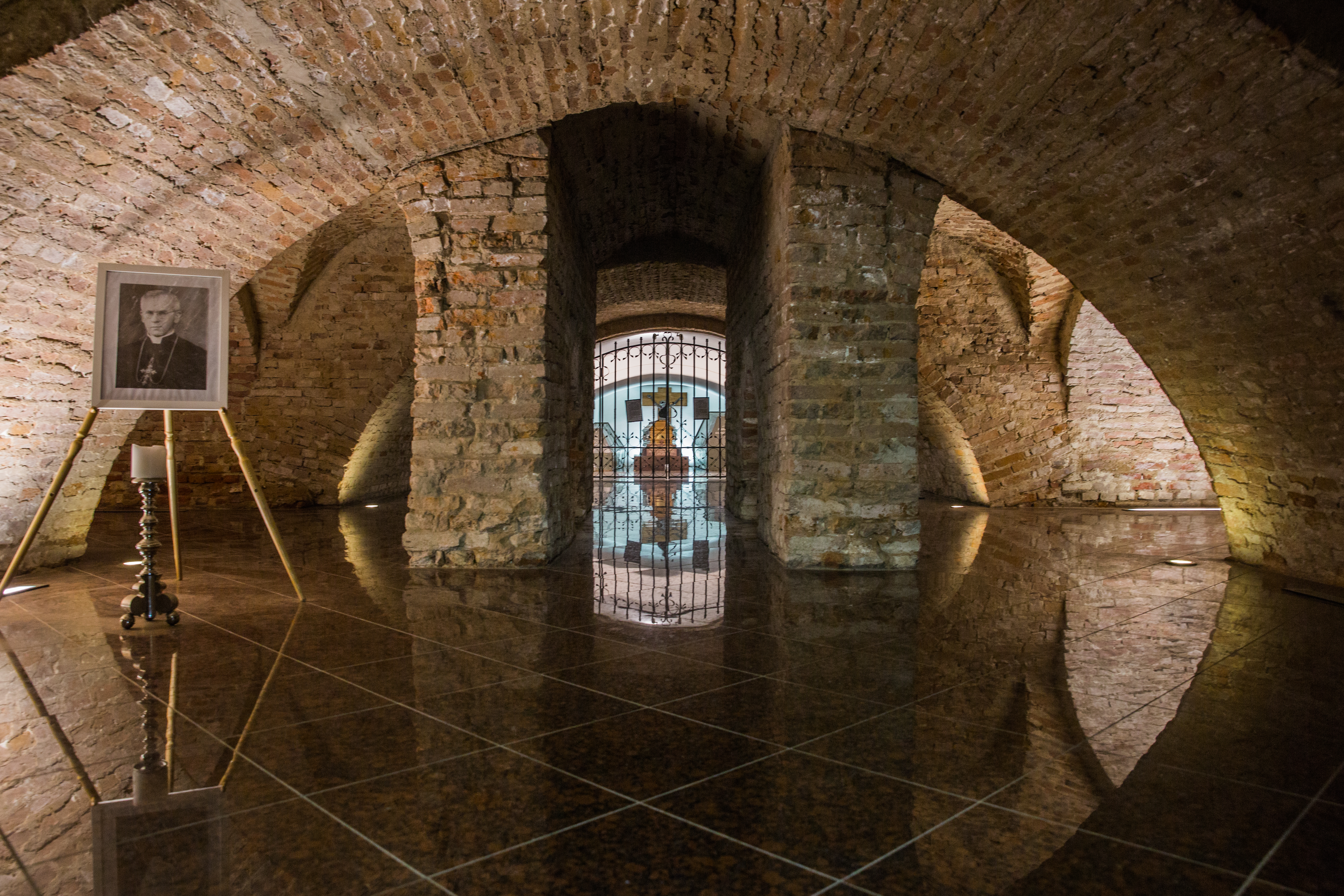

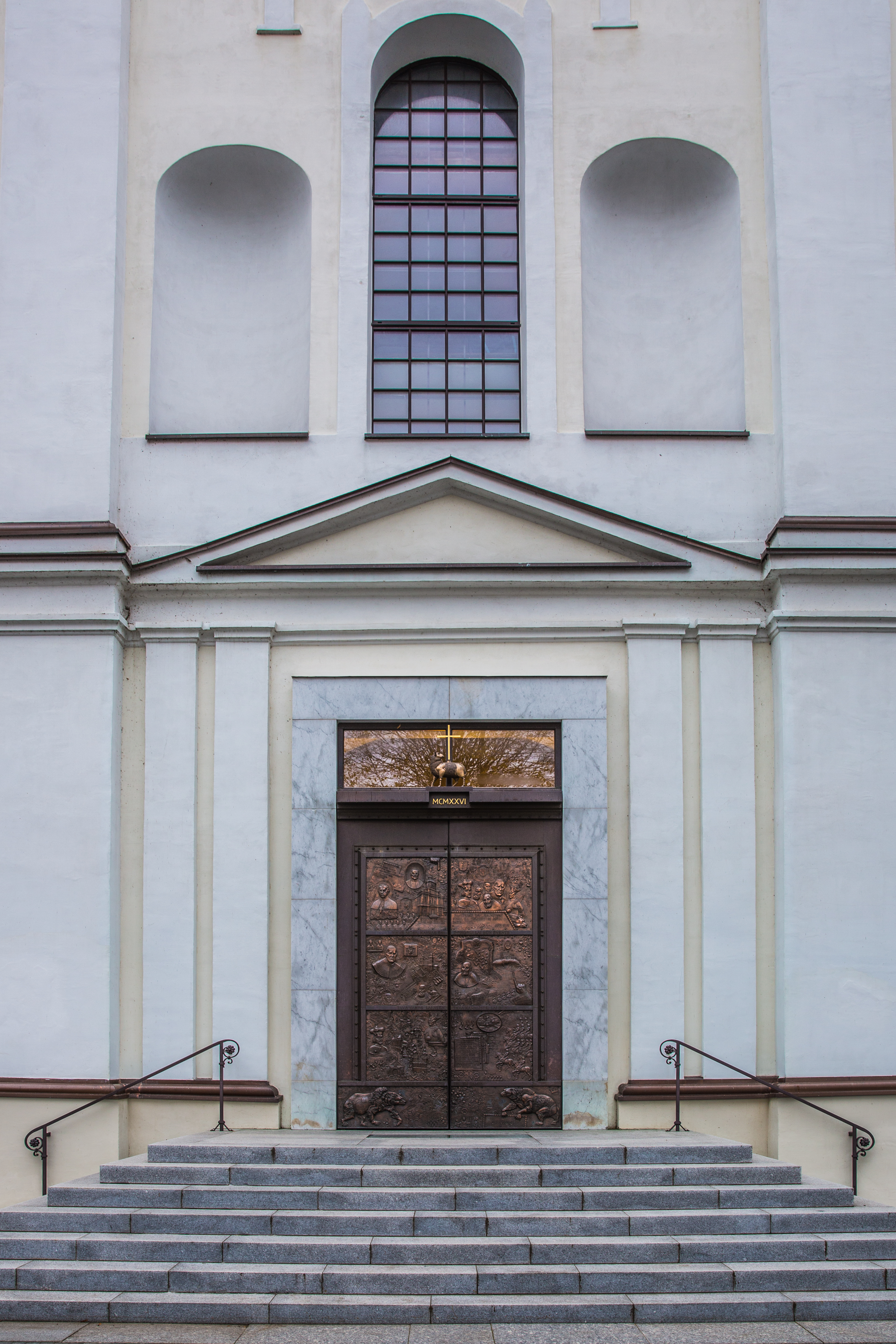

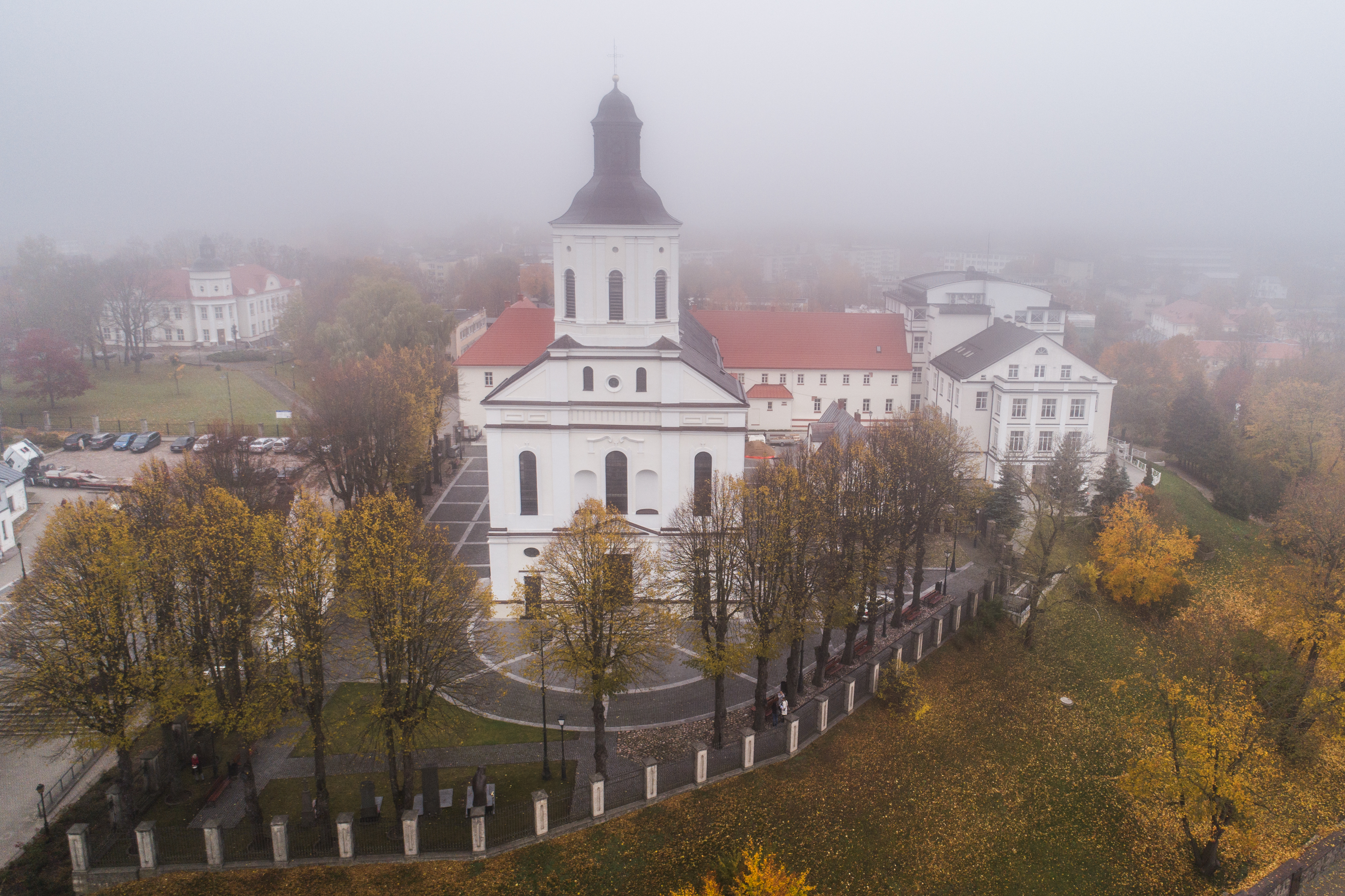

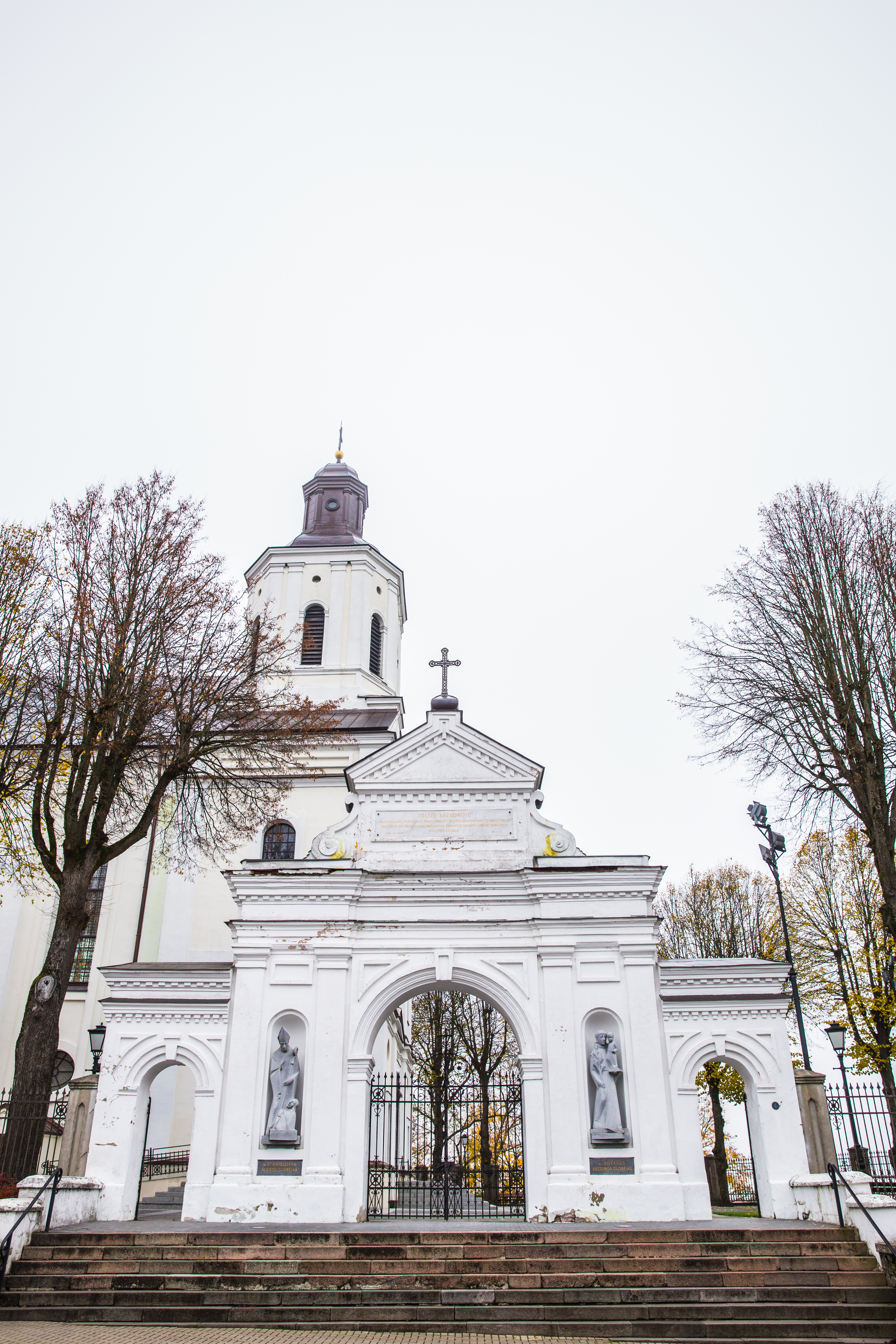
