= Lauko Soda =

- Town
- Location within Lithuania
- Coordinates: 55°53′31″N 22°15′22″E
- Country: Lithuania
- County: Telšiai County
- Municipality: Telšiai district municipality
- Eldership: Ryškėnai eldership

Population (2011)
  - Total: 134
- Time zone: UTC+2 (EET)
  - Summer (DST): UTC+3 (EEST)

Lauko Soda (Samogitian: Lauka Suoda, Polish: Ławkosody) is a town in Telšiai County, Lithuania. According to the 2011 census, the town has a population of 134 people.
