= Šunskai =

- Town
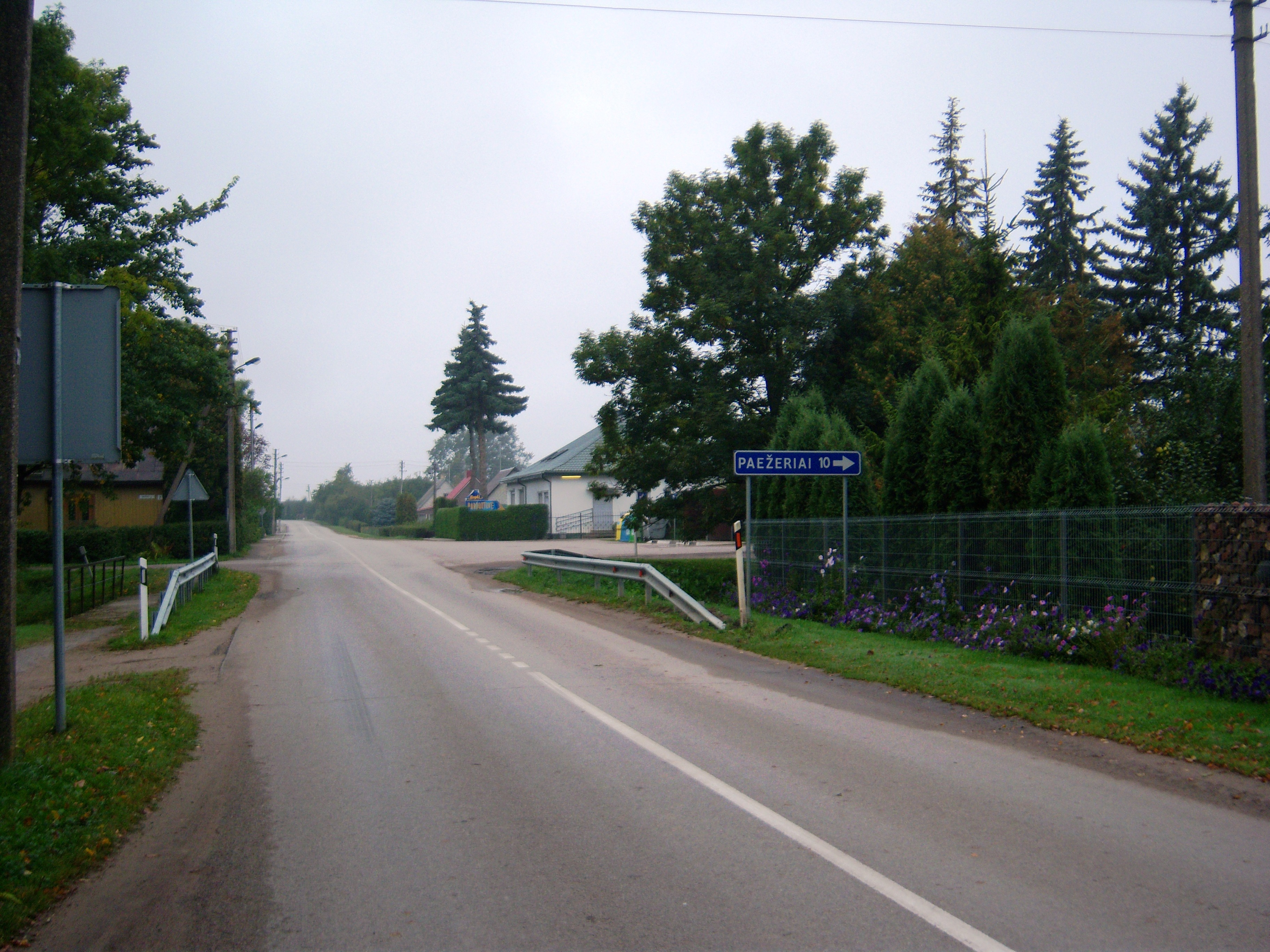

- Location within Lithuania
- Coordinates: 54°38′30″N 23°19′30″E
- Country: Lithuania
- County: Marijampolė County

Population (2021)
  - Total: 402
- Time zone: UTC+2 (EET)
  - Summer (DST): UTC+3 (EEST)

Šunskai is a small town in Marijampolė County, in southwestern Lithuania. It is known for its pheasant sanctuary, the only one of its kind in the country.

== Geography and location ==
Šunskai is a small town located within the Marijampolė County in southern Lithuania, situated approximately 8 kilometers northwest of the city of Marijampolė. It serves as a local parish center for the surrounding rural area. The town is traversed by the Žvirgždė River, a tributary of the Šešupė, while to the south of the town lies the Šunskai Forest.

== Demographics ==
According to the 2011 Lithuanian census, Šunskai had a population of 468 people. A decade later, the 2021 Lithuanian census, showed a population of 402 residents, reflecting a 1.6% average annual decrease. The town covers an area of 7.3 km^{2}, resulting in a population density of approximately 55 people per square kilometer. The population is relatively balanced by gender, with women making up 51% (205 individuals) and men accounting for 49% (197 individuals).

== Notable features ==
=== Pheasant Sanctuary ===
Šunskai is home to a unique pheasant sanctuary, the only one of its kind in Lithuania. Visitors can observe over 100 birds, including 17 different pheasant species, as well as other animals such as peacocks, pigeons, hens, squirrels, and alpacas. The sanctuary offers educational activities and is open from May to November.

=== Historical cemetery ===
The Šunskai cemetery is the final resting place of Tomas Ferdinandas Žilinskas, a prominent educator and cultural figure. Born in 1840, in Domeikava, he was known for distributing prohibited Lithuanian press materials and educating approximately 700 students over 37 years. His contributions to Lithuanian education earned him recognition as a "great patriarch of Lithuanian teachers".
