= Jonas Algimantas Boruta =

Lithuanian Roman Catholic prelate (1944–2022)

His Excellency Jonas Algimantas Boruta
- Bishop Emeritus of Telšiai
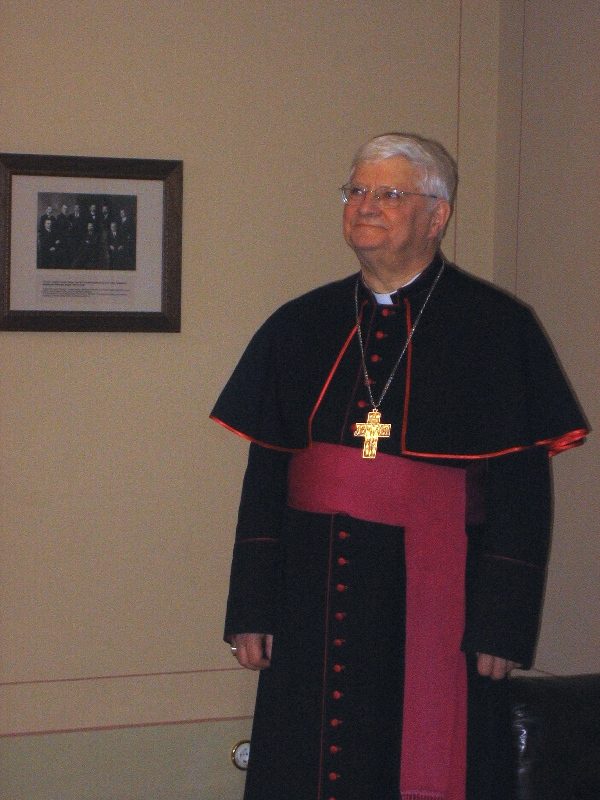
- Metropolis: Kaunas
- Appointed: 5 January 2002
- Term ended: 18 September 2017
- Predecessor: Antanas Vaičius
- Successor: Kęstutis Kėvalas
- Previous posts: Titular Bishop of Vulturaria and Auxiliary Bishop of Vilnius (1997–2002)

Orders
- Ordination: 5 August 1982 by Julijonas Steponavičius
- Consecration: 21 June 1997 by Audrys Juozas Bačkis

Personal details
- Born: 11 October 1944 Garliava, Lithuanian SSR, USSR
- Died: 19 December 2022 (aged 78) Marijampolė, Lithuania

Jonas Algimantas Boruta (11 October 1944 – 19 December 2022) was a Lithuanian Roman Catholic prelate, Jesuite.

Boruta was born in Garliava, Lithuania and was ordained to the priesthood in 1982. He served as titular bishop of Vulturaria (1997–2002) and as auxiliary bishop of the Roman Catholic Archdiocese of Vilnius, Lithuania (1997–2002), and as bishop of the Roman Catholic Diocese of Telšiai, Lithuania, from 2002 until his resignation in 2017.

Catholic Church titles
Preceded by Antanas Vaičius	Bishop of Telšiai; 2002–2017	Succeeded by Kęstutis Kėvalas
Preceded by —	Auxiliary Bishop of Vilnius; 1997–2002	Succeeded by —
Preceded by Rolando Octavus Joven Tria Tirona	Titular Bishop of Vulturaria; 1997–2002	Succeeded by Thomas John Joseph Paprocki
