= Telšiai Cathedral =

Cathedral in Telšiai, Lithuania

St. Anthony of Padua Cathedral Šv. Antano Paduviečio katedra
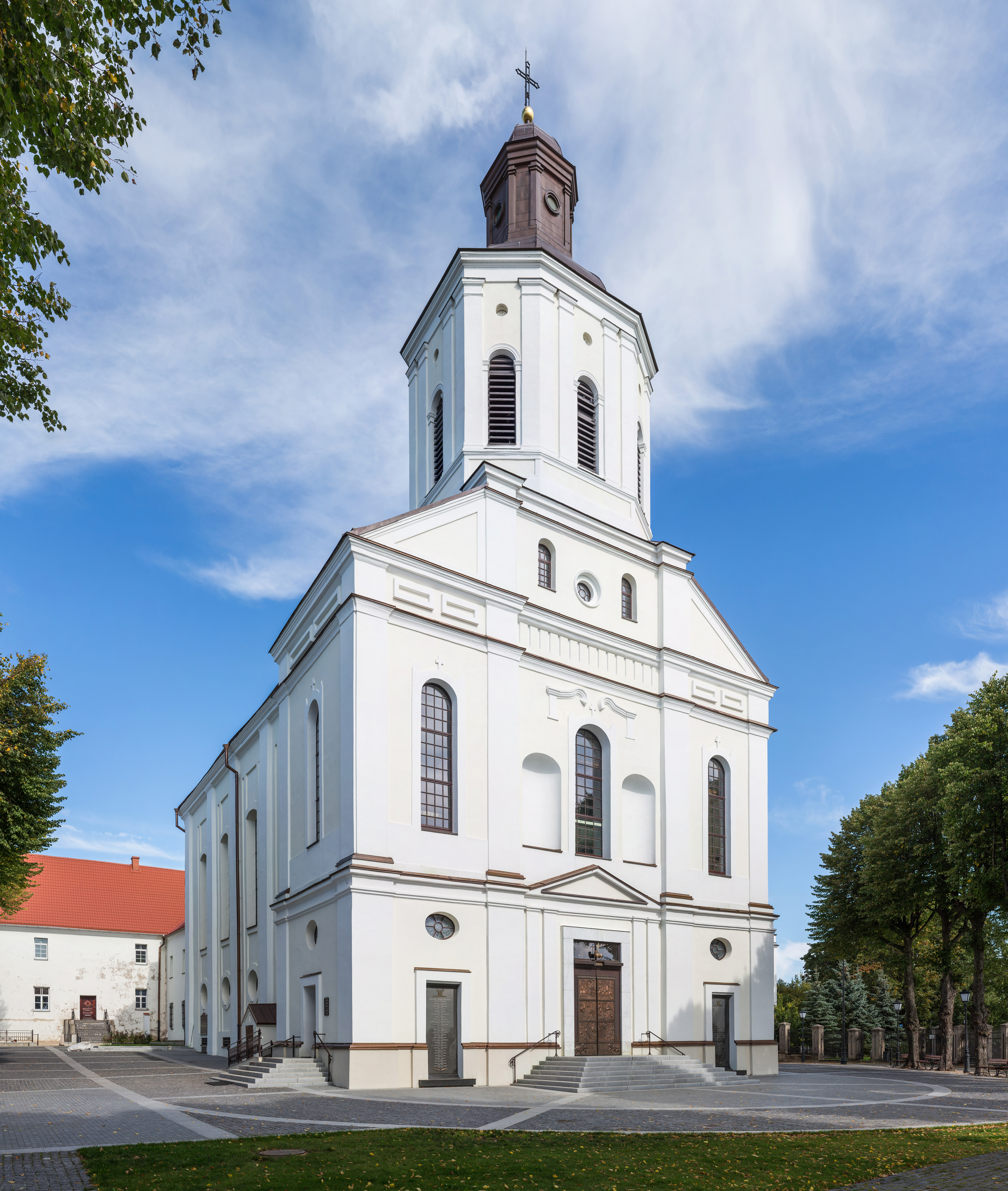

Religion
- Affiliation: Roman Catholic
- Ecclesiastical or organisational status: Cathedral
- Year consecrated: 1794
- Status: Active

Location
- Location: Telšiai, Lithuania
- Interactive map of St. Anthony of Padua Cathedral; Šv. Antano Paduviečio katedra
- Coordinates: 55°58′56″N 22°14′47″E

Architecture
- Style: Baroque and Classicism
- Materials: plastered masonry

Website
- telsiukatedra.lt

St. Anthony of Padua Cathedral (Lithuanian: Telšių Šv. Antano Paduviečio katedra) is a Roman Catholic cathedral in Telšiai, Lithuania, seat of the Roman Catholic Diocese of Telšiai.

== History ==
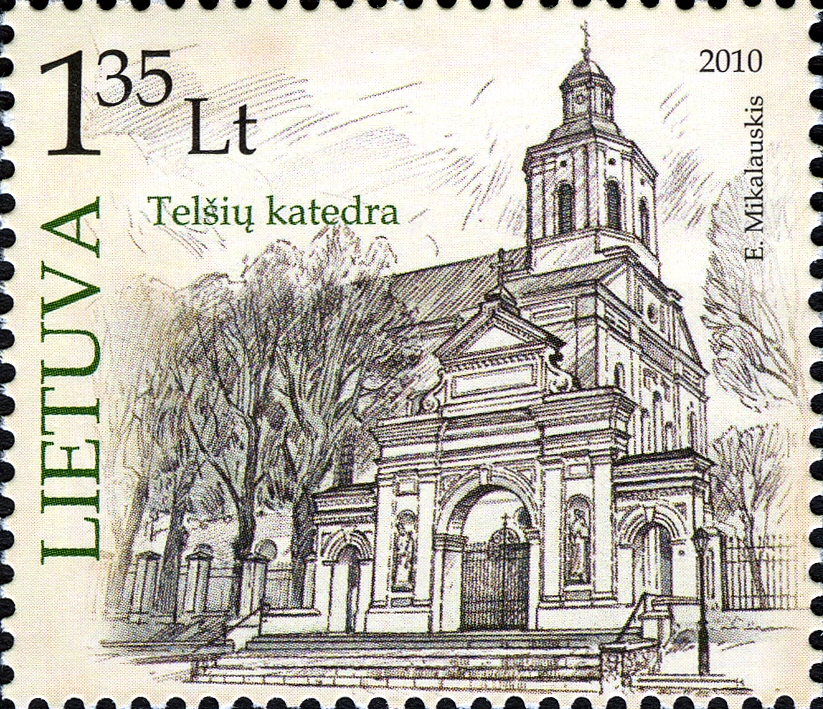
Telšiai Cathedral stamp

The history of the church dates back to 1624, when Deputy Chancellor of Lithuania Paweł Stefan Sapieha established a Franciscan monastery and built a wooden church on Insula Hill in the centre of Telšiai. A new spacious brick church was constructed between 1762 and 1794. It was consecrated in 1794 by the suffragan bishop of Samogitia, Fr Tadeusz Józef Bukaty (Lithuanian: Tadas Juozapas Bukota).

In 1802, the renowned Vilnius architect Jan Boretti was obliged to construct two towers and a narthex. However, for unknown reasons he built only the narthex and failed to complete the work of towers.

The Franciscan monastery was dissolved in 1853 by the Russian tsar, and the church became parish church. Romualdas Leščevskis became the first secular parish priest in 1854. The tower was built in 1859. In 1893 architect Piotras Serbinovičius designed the fence and gates of the churchyard.

After the establishment of the Roman Catholic Diocese of Telšiai in 1926, the church became a cathedral. Three bishops of Telšiai, Justinas Staugaitis, Vincentas Borisevičius, and Pranciškus Ramanauskas, are buried in the cathedral's tomb. Bishops Petras Maželis, Juozapas Pletkus and Antanas Vaičius are buried in the churchyard.

In 1938 the Czech master and organ builder Otto Kratokvil built a modern organ. This large manual and foot-operated Romantic-style organ has 22 registers and is machine-made. The keyboard and mechanical parts were manufactured by various western firms and the wooden pipes were made in Šiauliai.

To commemorate the 600th anniversary of baptism of Samogitia, the artist Romualdas Inčirauskas decorated the doors of the cathedral with the Samogitian baptism story. The crypt was also reconstructed.

== Architecture ==
The cathedral reflects features of Baroque and Classicism. Its plan is rectangular. It has one tower and a three-wall apse. The cathedral's nave is bordered by two aisles, separated by piers. Two-sloped roof provides the cathedral with slender proportions. It also has a tower above the eastern facade. The exterior of the building is laconic and restrained. The modest width of the side facades is divided by original pairs of windows: smaller oval windows light the lower gallery and the upper part has tall narrow windows. The space between the windows is divided by the pilasters.

The interior of the cathedral is spacious and light. The pillars which support the gallery are modified visually by the arches which link them and surround the chancel. Profiled wall columns, cornices and the installations form an organic part of the interior. Artist Jurgis Mažeika designed two altars beside the pillars and in the presbytery as well as the pulpit while artist Tomasz Podhajski (Lithuanian: Tomas Podgaiskis) designed three altars in the second storey and the central altar.

Telšiai Cathedral is the only church in Lithuania which has a two-storey altar.

The churchyard gates are designed as a tripartite triumphal arch with ornamental decoration: the complex cornices, vaults and niches reflect the harmony of neo-baroque and neo-renaissance forms typical of fin-de-siecle historicism. in 2005 the sculptures of St. Anthony of Padua (patron of the cathedral) and St. Stanislaus (patron of Telšiai city) designed by Arūnas Sakalauskas were constructed to the churchyard gates.

== Interior gallery ==
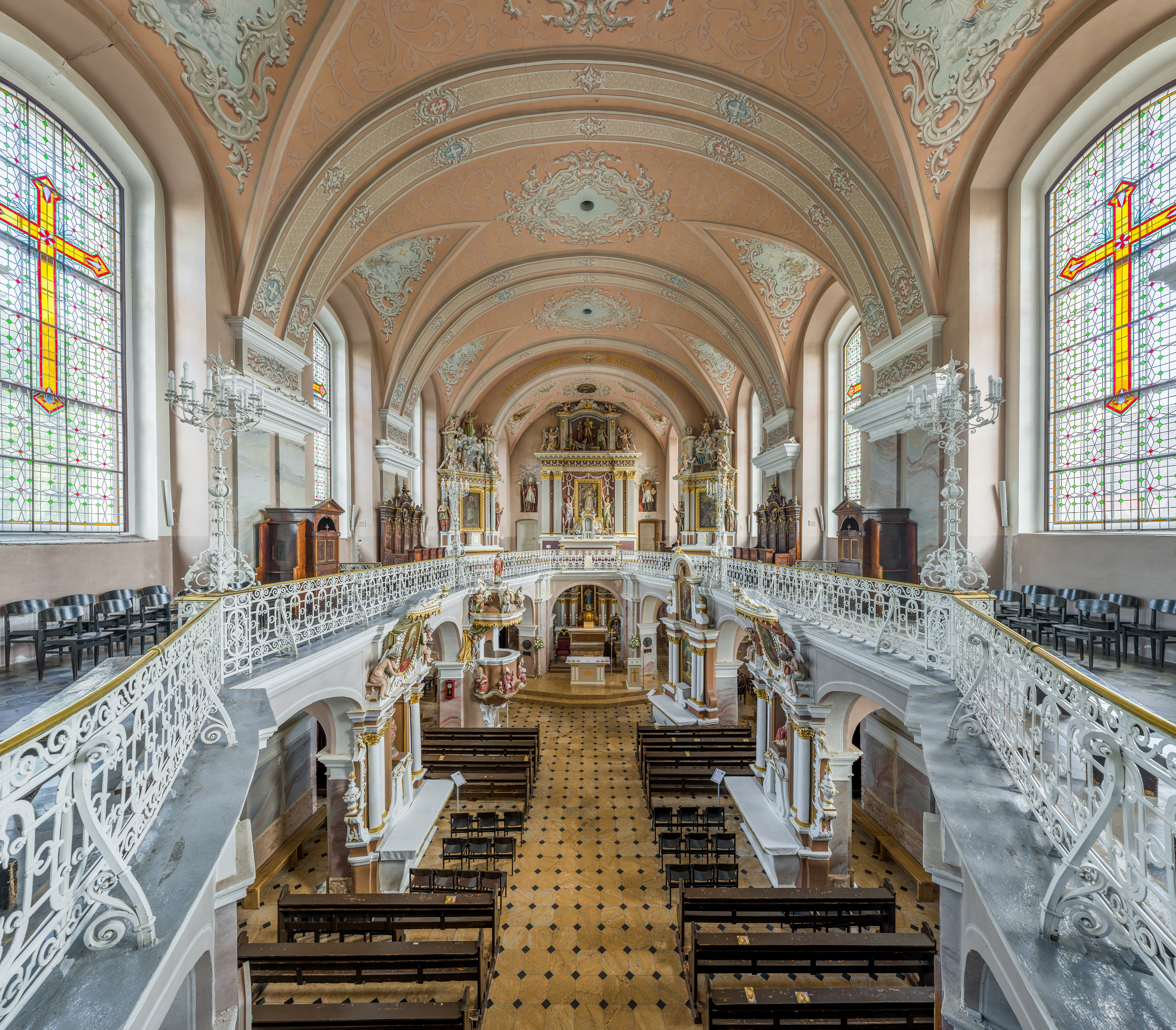

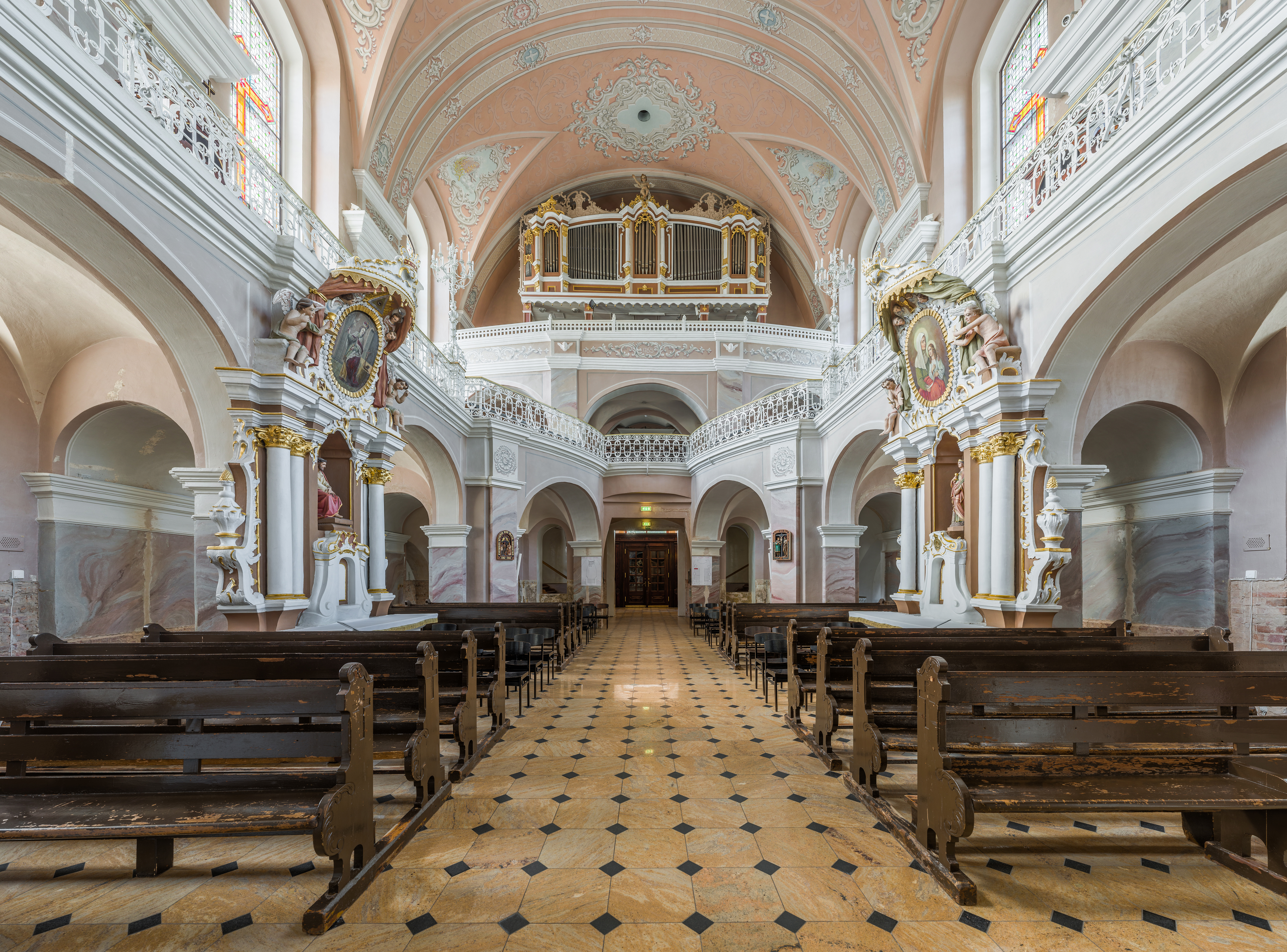

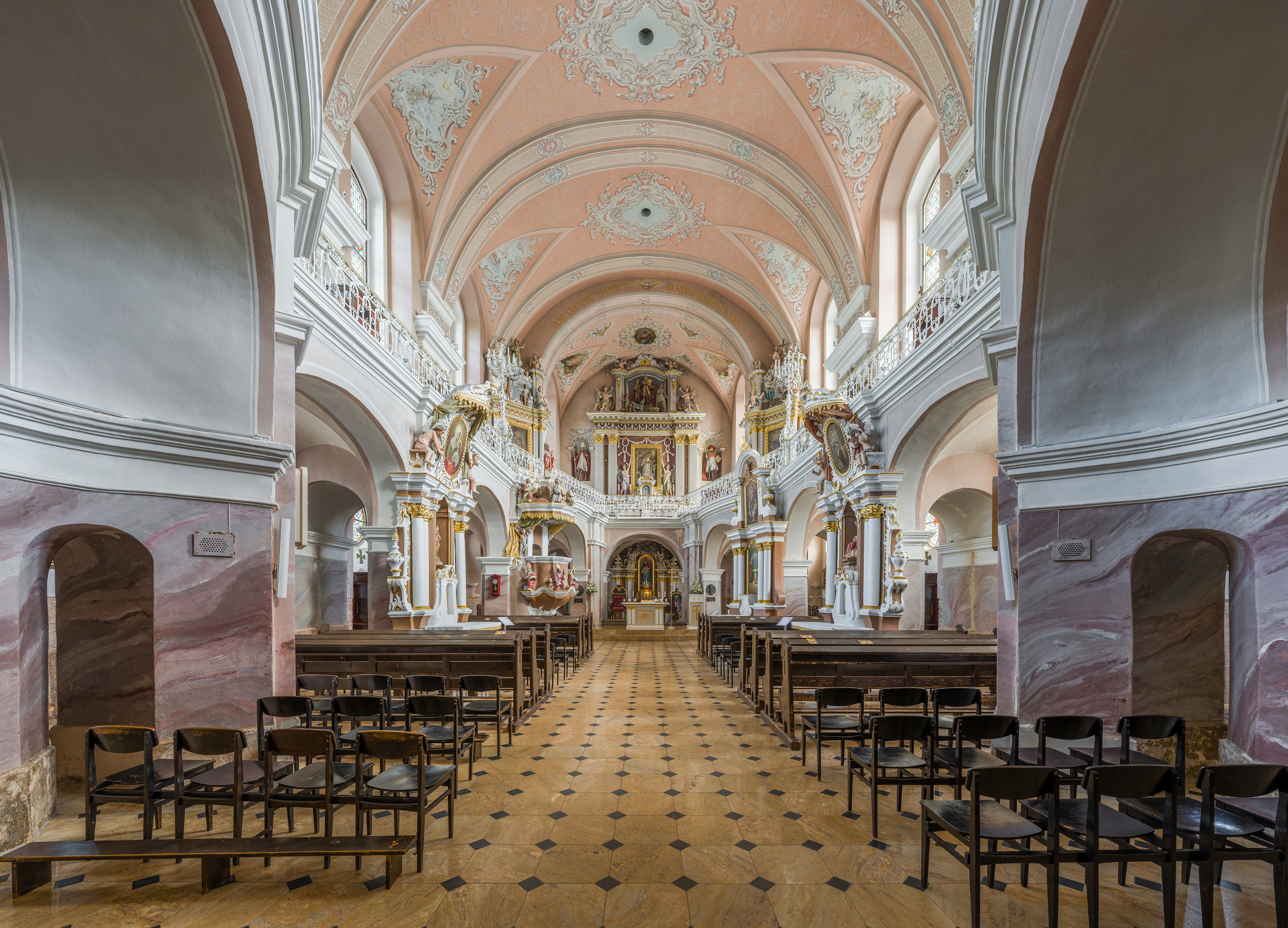

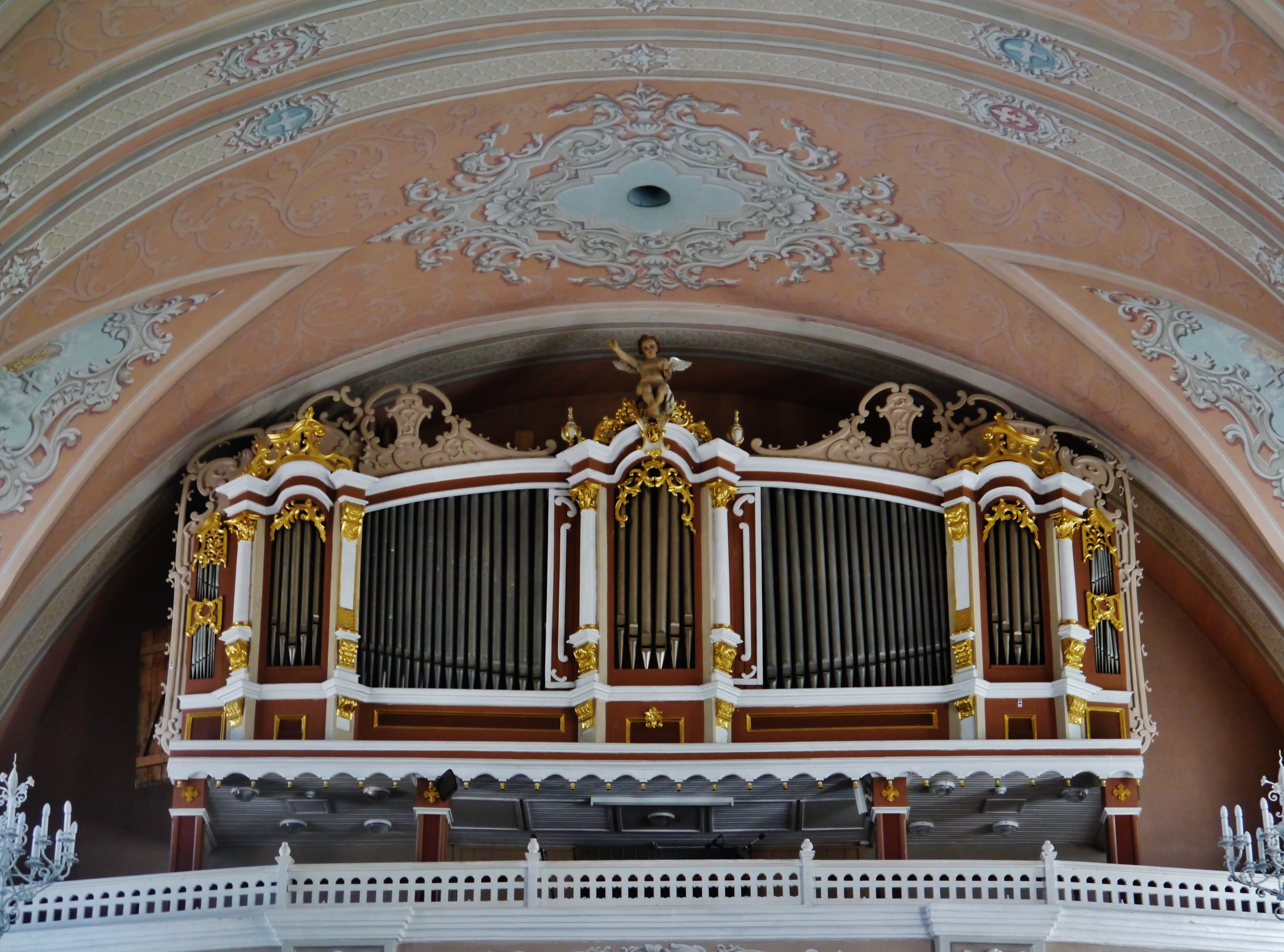

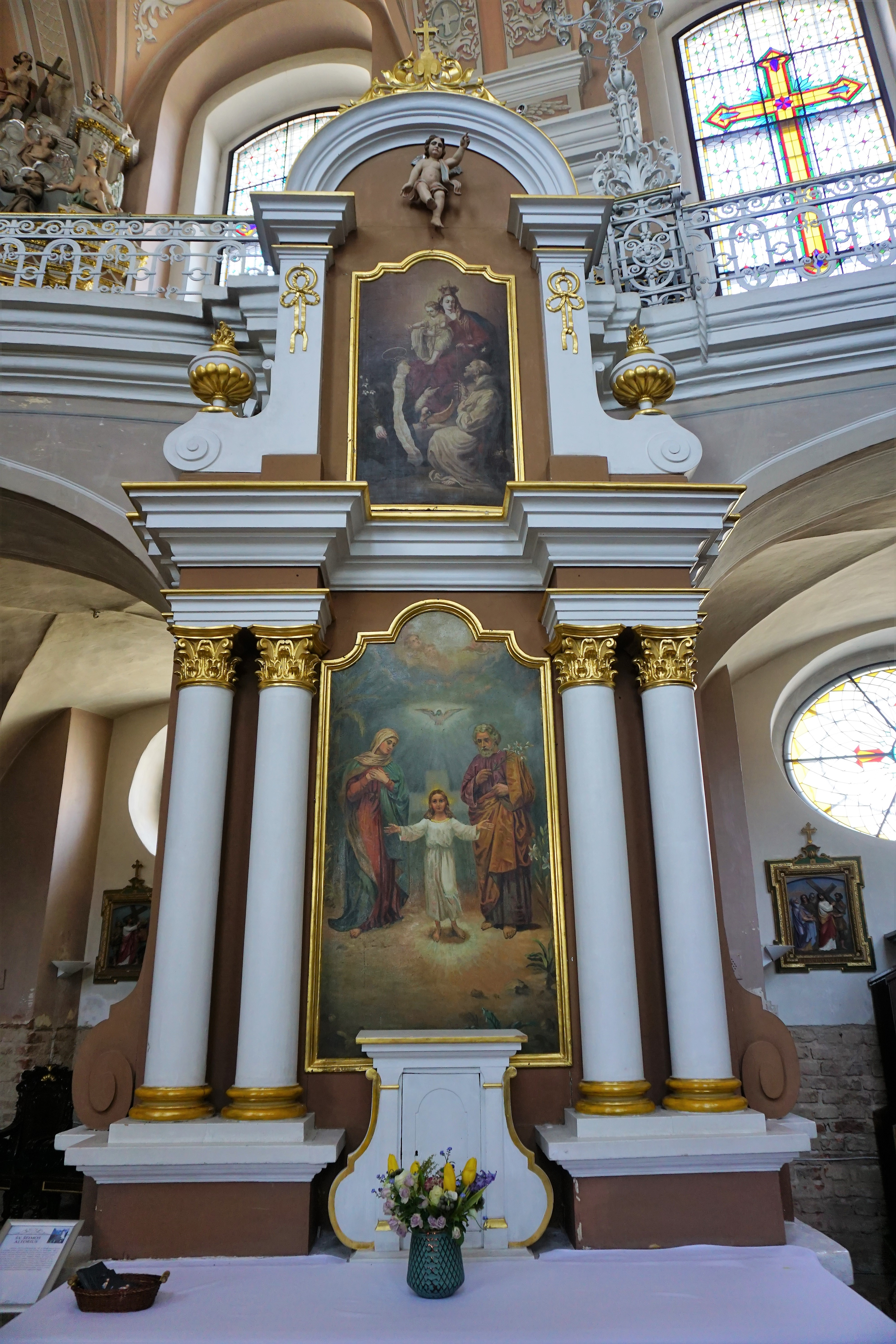

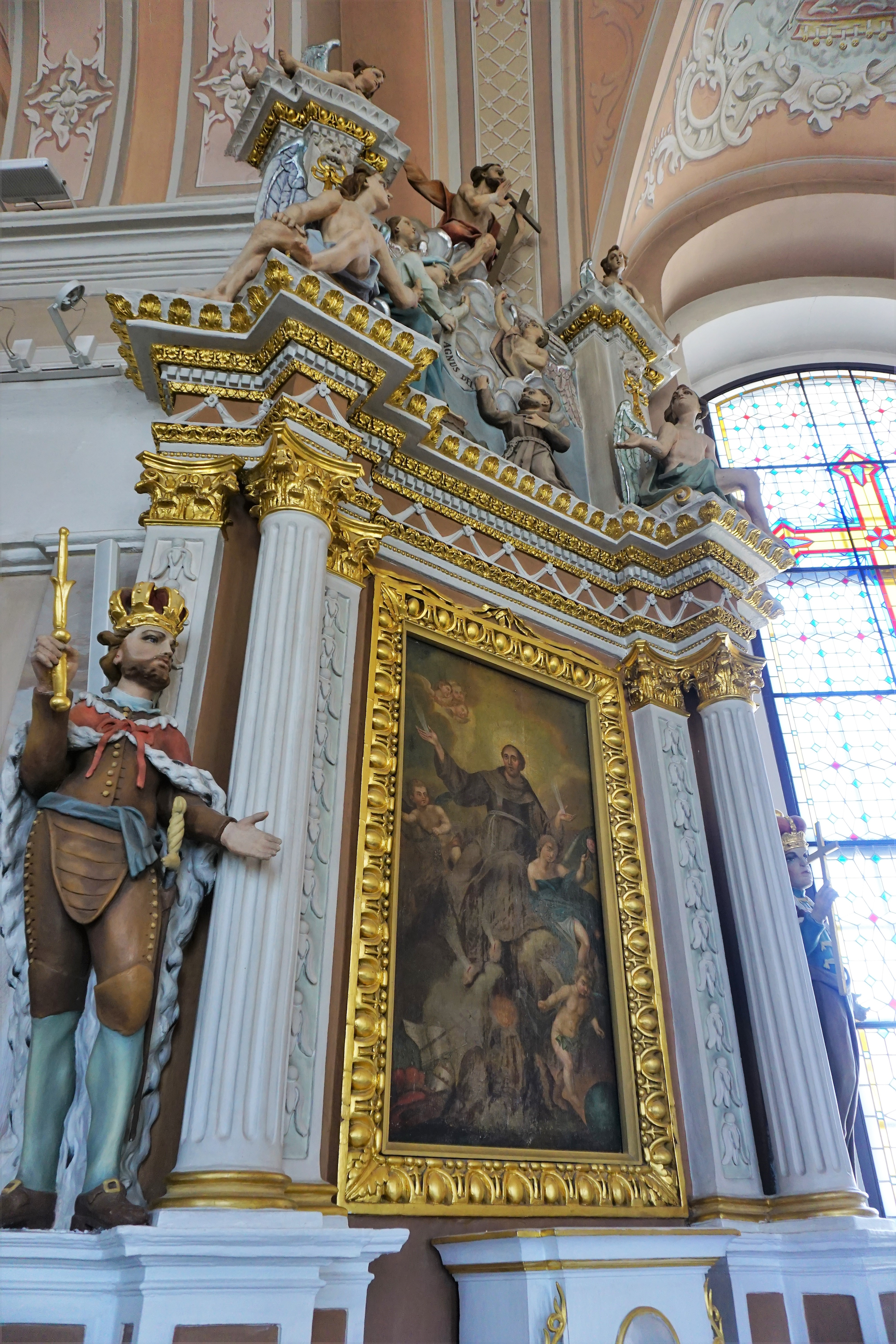

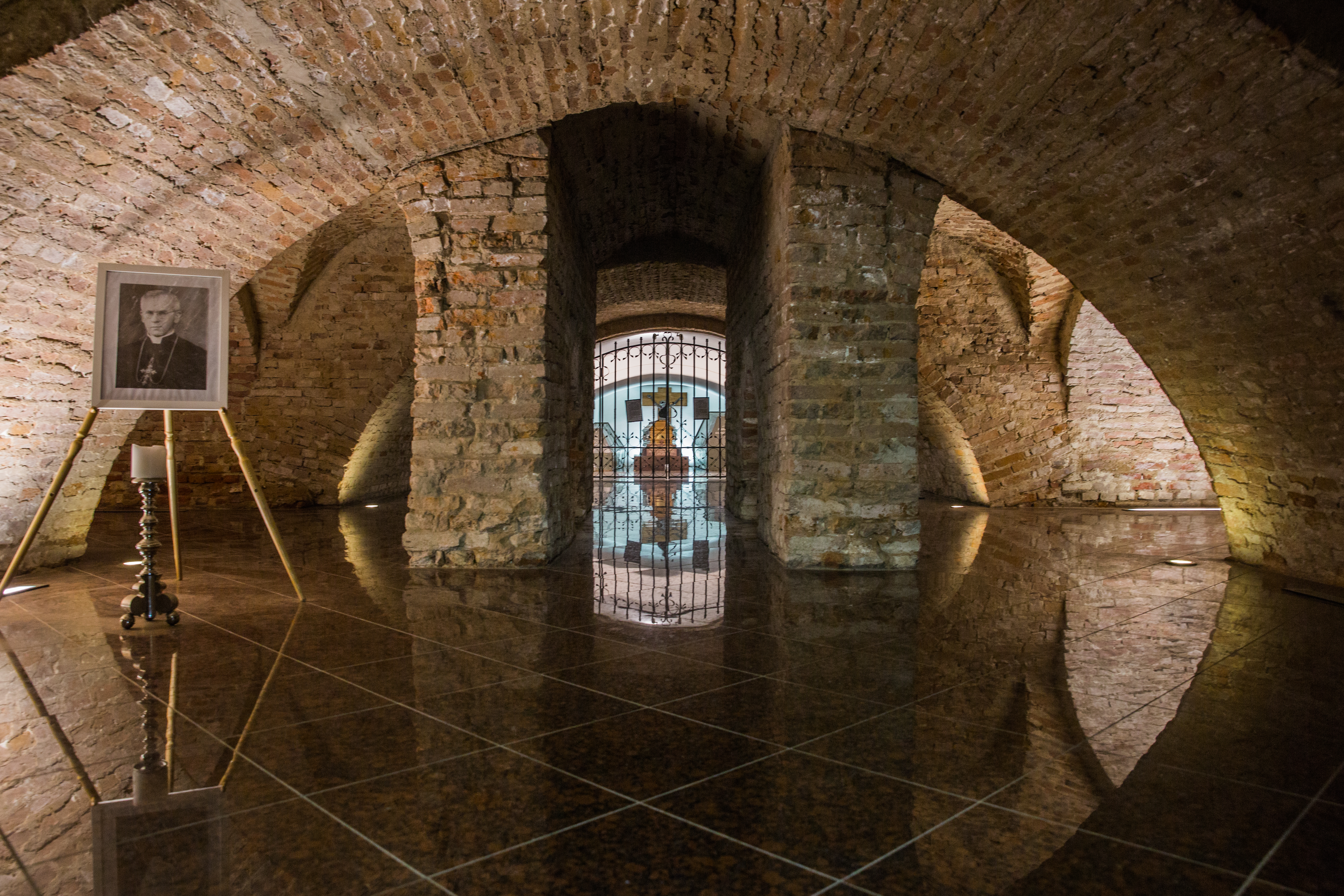
