= Lysias, Phrygia =

Lysias was a city and episcopal see in the Roman province of Phrygia Salutaris I and is now a titular see.

== History ==
The city of Lysias is mentioned by Strabo, XII, 576, Pliny, V, 29, Ptolemy, V, 2, 23, Hierocles, and the Notitiae Episcopatuum. It was probably founded by Antiochus III the Great about 200 BC.

Some of its coins are still extant.

Lequien (Oriens christianus, I, 845) names three bishops of Lysias, suffragans of Synnada:

- Theagenes, present at the Council of Sardica, 344
- Philip, at Chalcedon 451
- Constantine, at Constantinople, 879

== Location ==
Ruins of Lysias exist between the villages of Oinan and Aresli in the plain of Oinan, a little northeast of Lake Eğirdir.
