= Salakta =

Salakta سلقطة
- Town
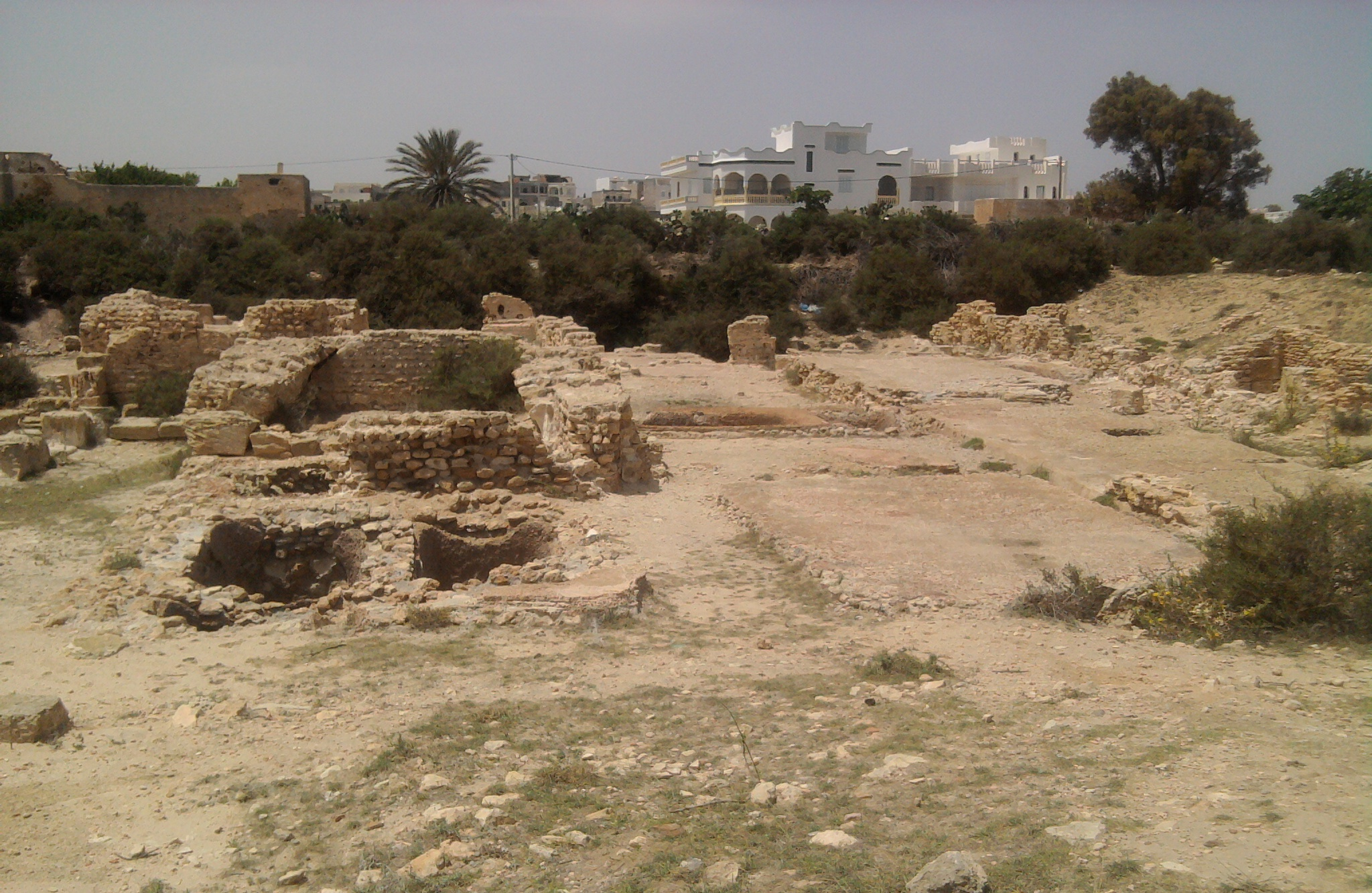
- Salakta.
- Nickname: Sullecthum
- Location in Tunisia
- Coordinates: 35°24′N 11°03′E
- Country: Tunisia
- Governorate: Mahdia Governorate

Population (2004)
  - Total: 3,477
- Time zone: UTC1 (CET)

Salakta is a small Tunisian village situated by the sea.

Salakta has been occupied or ruled by many civilisations, including the Phoenicians, Byzantines, Romans, and Muslim Oubéidines. The attractions include a beach, catacombs, an ancient cemetery and a museum. It is in Salakta that the mosaics "Lion" (with huge proportions, and which is displayed in the Bardo National Museum) was found.

Though not an established name in Tunisian tourism, Salakta is nevertheless one of the oldest historical sites in the country. Most of this is now under the sea, unfortunately. Its population swells from few hundreds to few thousands in summer when most of its people come back from Europe or from other Tunisian regions in order to spend summer.

== Description ==
Salakta is a village in the Sahel, Tunisia located five kilometers from Ksour Essef. (35°24'N, 11°03'E) Its name is derived from the Latin Sullecthum ( "blessed place" ) because of the beauty of its beach.

The village is attached to the delegation of Ksour Essef in the Mahdia Governorate, it had a population of 3,477 in 2004.

== History ==
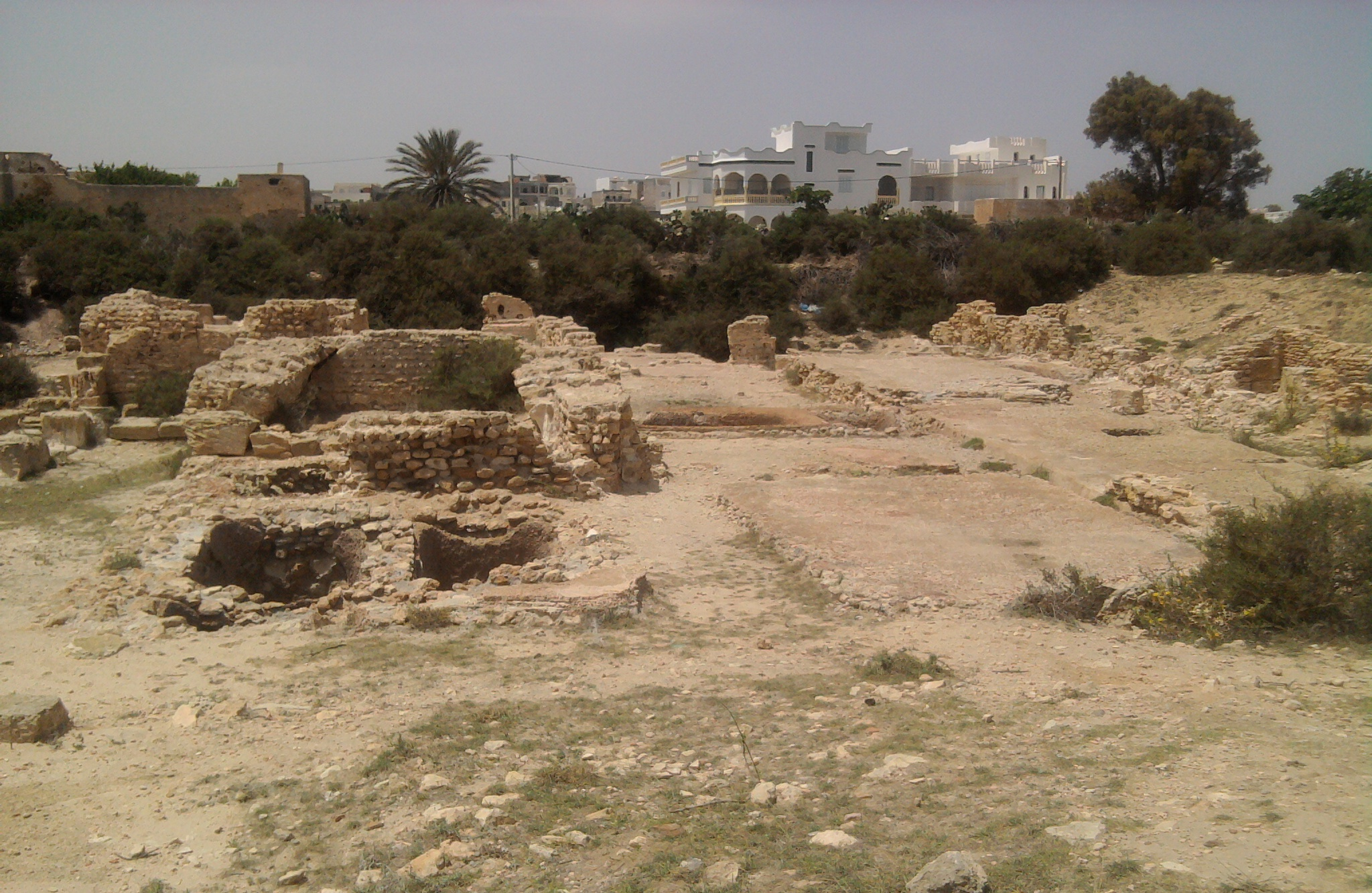
Roman Ruins at Salakta

The town was founded by Phoenicians, and later taken by the Romans and then the Arabs. The village was a privileged place for the Byzantines under Justinian who used it as a strategic point for their conquests. Belisarius's invasion of Africa began during the Vandalic War in 533, not far from Salakta on the Caput Vada.

During the Second World War, both the French Army and the German Afrika Korps maintained a military base here.

== Archaeological remains ==
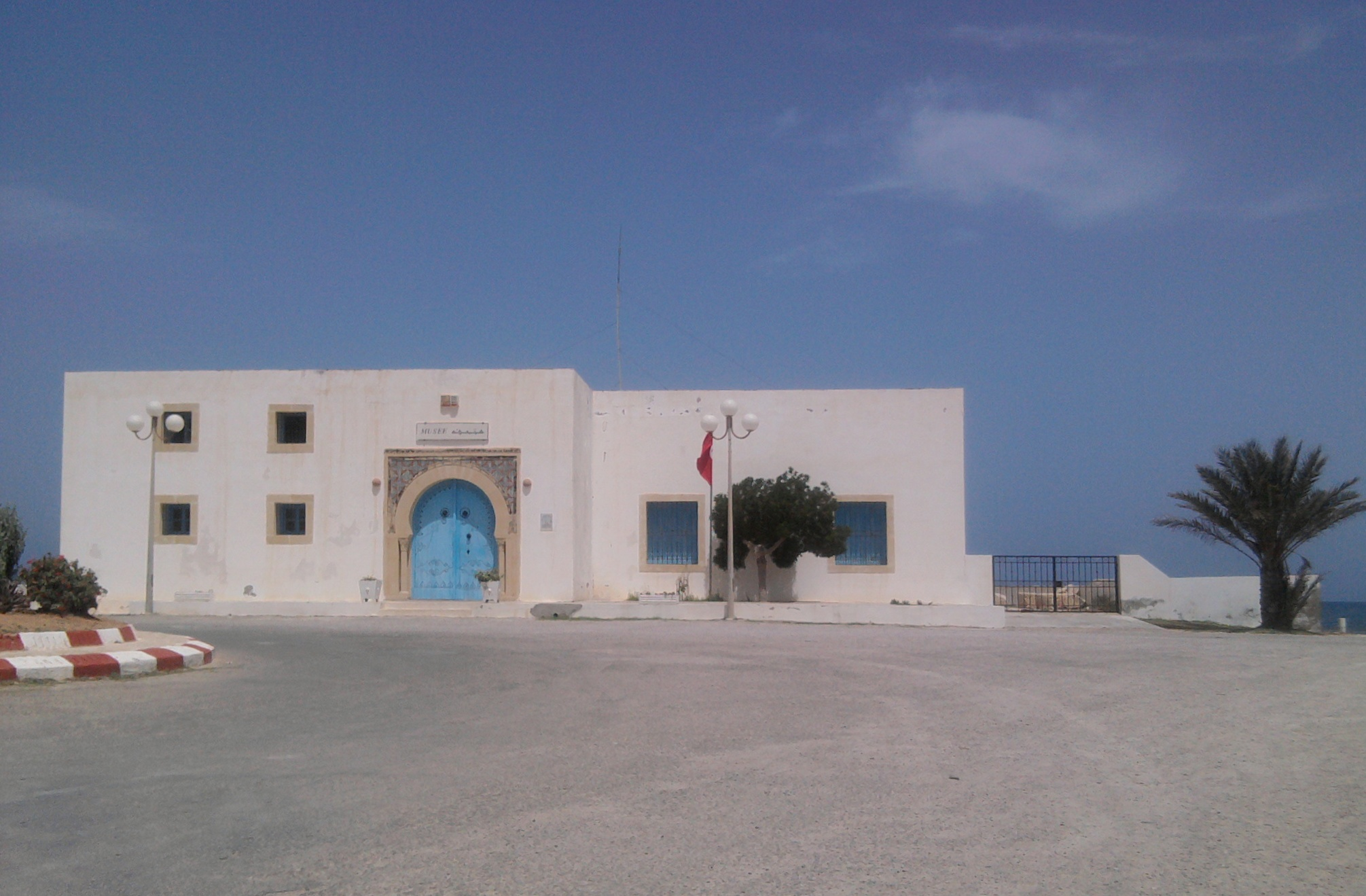
Archaeological Museum of Salakta

Salakta is one of the oldest historical sites in the country. It features a small museum set within the site of the ancient site. However, the majority of the latter is under the sea.

One of the main mosaics of the Bardo National Museum, representing an African lion, was discovered in Salakta in 1958. In Roman times, Salakta was an important commercial port under the name of Syllectum or Sullectum. One of the offices of the Place des Corporations in Ostia bears the name of the navicularii of Syllectum, and oil amphorae with the original mark A SYLL have been found in Ostia and Salakta, Archaeological evidence of a trade of active oil between Salakta and Rome.

== Tourism ==
The beaches, the catacombs, an ancient cemetery, as well as the archaeological museum founded in 1980, are worth visiting. The museum shows excavation finds from the surrounding area, in particular terracotta as well as a large mosaic of a Berberlöwen. The mosaic has a height of about 3 meters and dates from the 3rd century. There are necropolises of the megalithic culture in the surroundings.

Although Salakta is not particularly important for tourism from abroad, it is still one of the oldest historical sites in the country. Most of the ancient settlement is now below the sea level. The population of Salakta developed not least due to the tourism and attractiveness of the beaches of few hundred people to several thousand today.

== Bishopric ==
Sullectum was the seat of a bishopric during the Roman Empire but this moved to near modern Mahdia in the Middle Ages. The ancient bishopric was re-established in name in the 20th century as a titular bishopric, with the current bishop being Ulrich Boom of Würzburg.
