= Zavyalov =

Zavyalov or Zavialov (Russian: Завьялов) is a Russian masculine surname, its feminine counterpart is Zavyalova or Zavialova. Notable people with the surname include:

- Alexander Zavyalov (born 1955), Russian skier
- Alexander Zavyalov (born 1969), Soviet and Russian ice hockey player
- Anatoli Zavyalov (born 1979), Russian football player
- Andrei Zavyalov (born 1971), Ukraine-born Turkmenistani football coach and former player
- Ekaterina Poistogova (born Zavyalova in 1991), Russian middle-distance runner
- Olga Zavyalova (born 1972), Russian cross-country skier
- Sergey Zavyalov (born 1958), Russian poet
- Vladimir Zavyalov (disambiguation), multiple people

== See also ==
- Zavyalov Island in the Sea of Okhotsk
