= Leszek Engelking =

Polish writer, literary expert and translator (1955–2022)

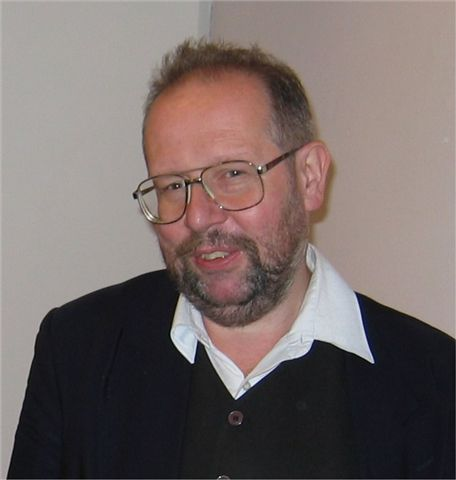
- Engelking in 2004
- Born: 2 February 1955; Chorzów, Poland
- Died: 22 October 2022 (aged 67)
- Education: Warsaw University

Leszek Maria Engelking (2 February 1955 – 22 October 2022) was a Polish poet, short story writer, novelist, translator, literary critic, essayist, Polish philologist, and literary academic, scholar, and lecturer.

Engelking translated a vast amount of literature into Polish, from Spanish, English, Russian, Ukrainian, Belarusian, Slovak but in particular from Czech.

== Biography ==
=== Education, editorial, and academic career ===
Engelking was born in Chorzów in 1955 and spent his childhood in Upper Silesia. In 1979, Engelking graduated from Warsaw University, he received his doctorate in 2002 and postdoctoral degree in 2013. From 1984 to 1995, he was a member of an editorial staff of "Literatura na Świecie" ("Literature in the World"), a Polish monthly devoted to foreign literature. From 1997 to 1998, he was a lecturer at Warsaw University and a visiting professor at Palacký University, Olomouc (Czech Republic). He taught at the University of Łódź.

=== Literary Memberships ===
Engelking was a member of Association of Polish Writers since 1989, the Polish PEN Club since 2000, and of the Société Europeénne de Culture since 1994.

Engelking was also an associate of the American journal Paideuma (which is devoted to Ezra Pound), the Czech journal Slavia, and the Polish monthly Tygiel Kultury.

=== Poetic career ===
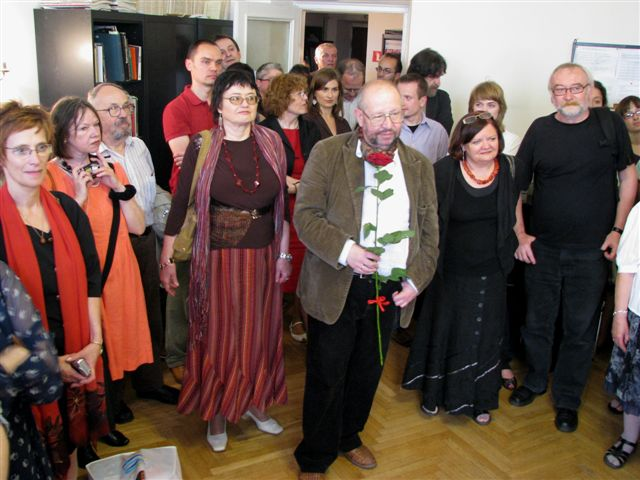
Engelking receives the "Literatura na Świecie" Award - Warsaw, June 25, 2009

He has published collections of poems:

- Autobus do hotelu Cytera (A Bus to the Cythera Hotel, 1979)
- Haiku własne i cudze (Haiku by Myself and Others, 1991)
- Mistrzyni kaligrafii i inne wiersze (The Mistress of Calligraphy and Other Poems, 1994) ISBN 83-7081-115-9
- Dom piąty (The Fifth House, 1997) ISBN 83-7081-377-1
- I inne wiersze (And Other Poems, 2000; new and selected poems) ISBN 83-7081-395-X
- Muzeum dzieciństwa (Museum of Childhood, 2011) ISBN 978-83-62717-13-2
- Komu kibicują umarli?, (For Which Team Do the Deceased Root?, 2013) ISBN 978-83-62717-75-0

A selection of his poems have appeared in Ukrainian translation (Vid ciogho ne vmirayut’/You Can't Die from This; 1997, ISBN 966-7255-08-5), as well as in Czech (Jiné básně a jiné básně/Other Poems and Other Poems; 1998, ISBN 80-7198-336-5) and Slovak (Zanechala si odtlačky prstov na mojej koži/You have Left Finger-Marks on My Skin; 2005, ISBN 80-85508-62-1). A small collection of his poems was published in Spanish (Museo de la infancia/Museum of Childhood; 2010, ISBN 978-84-937657-4-3; depósito legal Z-42-2010).

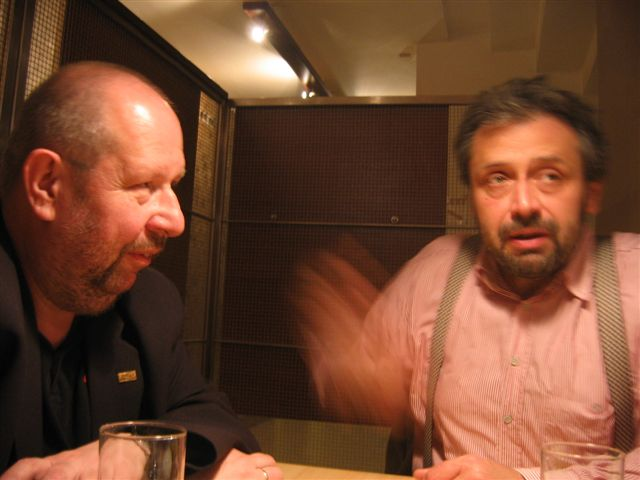
Leszek Engelking with Czech writer and translator Vaclav Burian - Warsaw, Łowicka Center, 20 May 2006

=== Short story and monograph writer career ===
Engelking's book of short stories Szczęście i inne prozy (Good Fortune and Other Stories) appeared in 2007, ISBN 978-83-7233-116-8.

Engelking published the following monographs: Vladimir Nabokov (1989, ISBN 83-07-01628-2), Vladimir Nabokov - podivuhodný kouzelník (1997, in Czech, ISBN 80-7198-258-X) and Chwyt metafizyczny. Vladimir Nabokov - estetyka z sankcją wyższej rzeczywistości (2011, The Metaphysical Device: Vladmir Nabokov – Aesthetics with the Sanction of Higher Reality), Surrealism, underground, postmodernizm. Szkice o literaturze czeskiej (2001, ISBN 83-7171-458-0), Codzienność i mit. Poetyka, programy i historia Grupy 42 w kontekstach dwudziestowiecznej awangardy i postawangardy (2005, ISBN 83-7171-458-0), Nowe Mity. Twórczość Jáchyma Topola (2016, The New Myths. The Literary Oeuvre of Jáchym Topol, ISBN 978-83-8088-038-2), and Bytom w literaturze (2018, Bytom in Literature, ISBN 978-83-65786-17-3).

Engelking edited the anthology of British and American poetry Wyspy na jeziorze (1988, The Lake Isles), the anthology of Czech poetry Maść przeciw poezji (2008, Ointment against Poetry), the selection from the works of three contemporary Slovak poets, Oleg Pastier, Karol Chmel, and Ivan Kolenič, Oko za ząb (2006, An Eye for a Tooth ISBN 83-86872-83-7), as well as the anthology of imagist poetry Obraz i wir (2016, Image and Vortex, Andrzej Szuba was a joint editor of the book, ISBN 978-83-938702-2-6).

=== Literary translator career ===
He has translated works by Nabokov, Daniela Hodrova, Jáchym Topol, Ezra Pound, Miroslav Holub, Charles Bukowski, Christopher Reid, Nikolay Gumilyov, Petr Mikeš, Ivan Wernisch, Ivan Blatný, Agneta Pleijel, Oldřich Wenzl, Richard Caddel, Jaroslav Seifert, Václav Burian, Egon Bondy, Maximilian Voloshin, David A. Carrión, Gerardo Beltrán, W. B. Yeats, Pavol Országh Hviezdoslav, Jiří Kolář, Karel Čapek, Basil Bunting, Amy Lowell, H.D., William Carlos Williams, Langston Hughes, Kerry Shawn Keys, sor Juana Ines de la Cruz, Federico García Lorca, Abel Murcia, Sergey Zavyalov, Iryna Zhylenko, Lina Kostenko, and Andrei Khadanovich.

Engelking's selection of short stories by Ladislav Klíma appeared in 2004 (Jak będzie po śmierci [How It Will Be after Death]), his translation of Michal Ajvaz’s book of poems, short stories and a novel was published in 2005 (Morderstwo w hotelu Intercontinental. Powrót starego warana. Inne miasto The Murder in the Intercontinental Hotel. The Return of the Old Comodo Dragon. Other City). Ajvaz's novel Voyage to the South in his translation appeared in 2016 (Podróż na Południe).

== Personal life and death ==
Engelking's son, Wojciech Engelking is also a writer. Leszek privately was a fan of motorcycle speedway, football team Polonia Bytom, liked lager beer, and Armani perfumes.

Engelking died on 22 October 2022, at the age of 67.

== Honours ==
- The Award of "Literatura na Świecie" for translation (1989, 2003, 2009, 2018),
- The Award of Polish Translators’ and Interpreters’ Society (2000)
- Premia Bohemica (the Czech prize; 2003)
- Polish PEN Club Award (2010)

== Sources ==
- Barbara Tyszkiewicz, Leszek Engelking. [In:] Polscy pisarze i badacze literatury przełomu XX i XXI wieku, vol. 2, ed. Alicja Szałagan, Polish Academy of Sciences, Warsaw 2024. ISBN 978-83-64703-00-3 (in Polish)
