= Petr Mikeš =

Czech poet, translator, and editor (1948–2016)

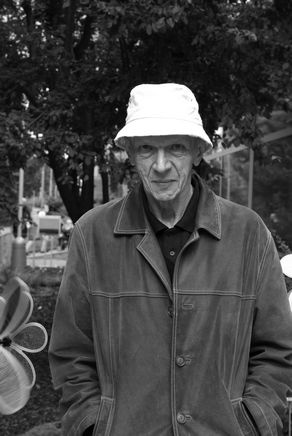
- Petr Mikeš
- Born: August 19, 1948; Zlín, Czechoslovakia
- Died: February 8, 2016 (aged 67)
- Occupations: Poet, translator, editor
- Children: 2
- Writing career
- Pen name: Jan Navratil, Petr Pistorius

Petr Mikeš (August 19, 1948 Zlín, Czechoslovakia – February 8, 2016 Benešov, Czech Republic) was a Czech poet, translator, and editor. In the 1970s and 1980s he took part in the samizdat edition Texty přátel (Texts of Friends). From 1993–1997 he was the influential editor-in-chief of the Moravian publishing house Votobia, and from 2000–2004 at the Periplum publishing house (and co-founder: he took its name from a line by Ezra Pound). He was a significant translator of Ezra Pound into Czech (he translated four generations of the Pound family into Czech: Homer Pound, Ezra Pound, Mary de Rachewiltz, and Patrizia de Rachewiltz). He translated members of Pound's "circle", including Basil Bunting, T.E. Hulme, and James Joyce, and even wrote a screenplay for a biopic on the life of Ezra Pound, Solitary Volcano (unproduced).

== Life ==
Petr Mikeš was born in 1948 in Zlín, Czechoslovakia, later the family moved to Olomouc, where he grew up and maintained the family home (the “old house” of his poetry, where he took in many an interesting border) until his death. He studied library science in Brno, where he befriended poets Jaroslav Erik Frič and Jiří Kuběna and philosopher Josef Šafařík, and English and Russian at Palacký University Olomouc; he left the university, mostly for political reasons. Instead, he became the night watchman of the theatre in Olomouc-Hodolany, where he read deeply and also wrote and translated, and finished studies in library science, eventually becoming a librarian. He converted to Catholicism in 1972, which had a profound influence on his poetic work. In the 1980s he translated textbooks for Palacký University, and was the Czech correspondent for Paideuma, a journal dedicated to Pound studies published by the National Poetry Foundation (USA). At this time some of his poems were translated into Polish by Leszek Engelking and into German by Otto František Babler, an iconic translator into Czech, whom Mikeš knew personally.
After the Velvet Revolution, he was awarded a USIS scholarship to the US in 1990, where he was a guest of the National Poetry Foundation at the University of Maine at Orono, and the Iowa Writers Workshop at the University of Iowa in Iowa City. There he befriended the American poet Kerry Shawn Keys and met Czech poet in exile Bronislava Volková. His poetry appeared in English, translated by Kerry Shawn Keys; and officially in Polish, translated by Leszek Engelking, a close friend. In the early 1990s, he was invited to become editor-in-chief of Votobia Publishers in Olomouc, which became the largest publishing house in Moravia during his tenure. In 1994, he was awarded a Fulbright scholarship to the University of Maine in Orono, where he involved himself more deeply in Ezra Pound scholarship and gathered material for his anthology of New England poets, meeting many of the poets personally. He became good friends especially with Burton Hatlen, Sylvester Pollet, and Carroll F. Terrell, whose works he later translated in more breadth. His friendship with Matthew Sweney, whom he met in Orono in 1990, was strengthened at this time; Mikeš eventually invited Sweney to work for Votobia in Olomouc, and Sweney became Mikeš's 'court translator' into English. Contacts with the British Council brought him in touch with poets Richard Caddel and Stephen Watts, with whom he became friends, translating their verse in Czech. After leaving Votobia in 1998, he co-founded the publishing house Periplum, which specialised in poetry, philosophy and political science. In addition to English, he also translated from Slovak, Polish, and Russian.
He was married three times: to photographer Milena Valušková, sister of his friend and fellow poet Rostislav Valušek; to translator Iveta Mikešová, with whom he had two children, Jan and Tereza; and to the novelist and editor Alena Jakoubková.
He was a professional translator, covering fields such as science and economics. In terms of his literary translations, his contributions of English language poetry and Pound studies into Czech are major. He also translated mystery novels, and non-fiction on the atrocities of fascism. He is known for his “quiet, thoughtful poetry”, which could probably be best described as minimalist – his translation of Basil Bunting's Briggflatts into sparse Czech is masterful – with a good dose of Catholicism, and the haiku form suited him especially well.

== Works ==
=== Samizdat poetry collections ===
Petr Mikeš was one of the writers-editors-typists of the important Moravian samizdat edition Texty přátel (others included poets Jaroslav Erik Frič, Rostislav Valušek, Eduard Zacha). He donated his archive of Texty přátel to the samizdat library Libri prohibiti in Prague.

- Oslovení (Salutations, 1973) – debut in the samizdat edition Texty přátel
- Křehčí než rosa na podzim (More Fragile Than Dew in Autumn, 1976)
- Drť světla (The Pulp of Light, 1977)
- Básně v próze (Poetry in Prose, 1977)
- Práh bolesti (Pain Threshold, 1978)
- Triptych (1980)
- Natalet (1980)
- Stříbrný pták ve žluté skříni (Silver Bird in a Yellow Cabinet, 1981)
- Stejný svět (Same World, 1982)
- Básně 1973–1982 (Poems 1973–1982, 1986)
- Dům je tam (Home is There, 1989)

=== Book collections of samizdat texts ===
- Dům je tam (Home is There, Votobia, 1993; reprint of the 1989 samizdat edition; Polish translation: Dom jest tam by Leszek Engelking, 1991)
- Básně v próze (Poetry in Prose, Votobia, 1996)
- Stříbrný pták ve žluté skříni (Silver Bird in a Yellow Cabinet, Votobia, 1997; reprint of the 1981 samizdat edition)
- Jediné touhy zpěv (Only the Desire for Song, 1998)

=== Post-1989 poetry collections ===
- Paměť rány (1990; English edition: Memory of the Wound, 1994)
- Jen slova / Just words (2005) – bilingual Czech edition with some English translation, and some haiku
- Starý dům. Haiku a jiné básně (Old House. Haiku and other poems, 2008)
- Benátské iluminace / Venetian Illuminations (poetry in prose, 2011)
- Dvojdomí (2012)

=== Memoirs ===
- Když na tebe sáhne smrt...vzpomínky a portéty (When You're at Death's Door... Memories and portraits, 2015)

== Translations (selection) ==
- Allen, Paul: Katyň: stalinský masakr a triumf pravdy (Katyń: Stalin's Massacre and the Triumph of Truth, 2015)
- Bacigalupo, Massimo: Pound v Rapallu (Pound in Rapallo, 2013)
- Blake, Adam: Démonův kód (The Demon's Code, 2015)
- Borges, Jorge Luis: Zrcadla jsou zvláštní věc: 2 rozhovory (Mirrors Are a Strange Thing: Two Interviews, 1996)
- Bunting, Basil: Briggflatts (2000)
- Caddel, Richard: Slova straky (Magpie Words, 2001)
- Caddel, Richard: Psaní v temnotě (Writing in the Dark, 2007)
- Davenport, Guy: Da Vinci's Bicycle (in Bacigalupo, Pound v Rapallu)
- Delinsky, Barbara: Stopy po ženě (Finger Prints, 1999)
- Ellis, Bret Easton: Míň než nula (Less than Zero, 1993, as Jan Navrátil)
- Gane, Mike: Rozhovory s Baudrillardem (Conversations with Baudrillard, 1998)
- Gordimer, Nadine: Poutníci (The Pick Up, 2004)
- Graham, Caroline: Smrt v převleku (Death in Disguise, 2002)
- Graham, Caroline: Psáno krví (Written in Blood, 2010)
- Graham, Caroline: Mrtví v Badgers Drift (The Killings at Badger's Drift, 2012)
- Haining, Peter (ed.): Zdi iluzí (The Walls of Illusion. A Psychedelic Retro, 1998)
- Hulme, T.E.: Modlitba za úsměv luny: básně, eseje, dokumenty/Thomas Ernest Hulme (A Prayer to the Moon to Smile: Poems, Essays, Documents, 2002)
- Jin, Ha: Čekání na Lina (Waiting, 2001)
- Joyce, James: Komorní hudba (Chamber Music, 2000)
- Kerouac, Jack: Písmo zlaté věčnosti (The Scripture of the Golden Eternity, 1996)
- Kerouac, Jack: Rozprášené básně (Scattered Poems, 1995)
- Keys, Kerry Shawn: Krajina supů (Vulture's Country, 1996)
- Leyson, Leon: Chlapec na dřevěné bedně: jak se nemožné stalo možným...na Schindlerově seznamu (The Boy on the Wooden Box: How the Impossible Became Possible... on Schindler's List, 2013)
- Mikeš, Petr (ed.): Vítr z Narragansettu. Poezie Nové Anglie (The Wind from Narragansett. Poetry of New England, 2002)
- Muldoon, Paul: Wishbone / Kost přání (2007)
- Myrer, Anton: Poslední Yankee z Bostonu (The Last Yankee in Boston, 2001)
- Nabokov, Vladimir: Promluv, paměti : návrat k jedné autobiografii (Speak Memory, translated by Pavel Dominik; P.M. translated the poetry, 1998)
- Polansky, Paul: Tíživé mlčení: Svědectví těch, kteří přežili Lety (A Difficult Silence: Accounts by Lety concentration camp survivors, 1998)
- Polansky, Paul: Toulavej pes (Stray Dog. Boxing Poems, 1999)
- Pollet, Sylvester: Básník Sylvester Pollet Ed. Matthew Sweney (The Poet Sylvester Pollet, 2011)
- Pound, Ezra: Chtěl jsem napsat ráj (I Wanted to Write Paradise, 1993)
- Pound, Ezra: Mistr těch, kteří vědí (Master of Those Who Know, 1995) – výbory z díla, na nichž se podílel také jako překladatel
- Pound, Ezra and Boris de Rachewiltz: Kočka a salamandr (The Cat and the Salamander, 2012)
- Pound, Ezra (ed.): Imagisté. Poezie angloamerických imagistů (Des Imagistes, 2000)
- Pound, Homer: Syn slavného otce (Small Boy. The Wisconsin Childhood of Homer L. Pound, 2011)
- Rachewiltz, Mary de: Diskrétnosti (Discretions, 2009)
- Rachewiltz, Mary de: Rodokmen. Ed. Jakub Guziur ("Family Tree" - from the collections Family Tree, Whose World?, For the Wrong Reason and manuscripts, additional translators Jakub Guziur and Anna Kareninová, 2011)
- Rachewiltz, Patrizia de: Můj Tchaj-šan (Mi Taishan, 2010)
- Rachewiltz, Patrizia de: Drazí přátelé (Dear Friends, 2015)
- Rushdie, Salman: Zem pod jejíma nohama (The Ground Beneath Her Feet, translated by Pavel Dominik, P.M. translated the lyrics, 2001)
- Shuker, Karl: Záhady planety Země (Mysteries of Planet Earth, 2000)
- Terrell, Carroll F.: Vzpomínky na indiánskou řeku (Growing Up Kennebec, 2002)
- Watts, Stephen: Gramsci & Caruso (2003)

== Sources ==
- Kolář, Bohumír. Haná v poezii. Olomouc: Literární klub Olomouc, 2008. ISBN 978-80-86636-26-9
- Martínková-Racková, Simona and Jitka Srbová, Michaela Šmejkalová, Jan Šulc. Antologie české poezie. II. díl (1986–2006). Prague: Dybbuk, 2007. ISBN 978-80-86862-30-9
- Volková, Bronislava and Clarice Cloutier. Up the Devil's Back/Po hřbetě ďábla. A Bilingual Anthology of 20th Century Czech Poetry. Bloomington IN: Slavica, 2008. ISBN 978-0-89357-362-1
