= Kruglov =

Vitas Kruglov (born 1990) Lithuanian, Company Director

Kruglov (Russian: Круглов) or Kruglova (feminine; Круглова), is a Russian last name and may refer to:

- Alexander Kruglov (1852–1915), Russian writer
- Dmitri Kruglov (born 1984), Estonian football player
- Georgy Kruglov (1905–1984), Soviet painter
- Leonid Kruglov (1916–1968), Soviet army officer and Hero of the Soviet Union
- Nikolay Kruglov (b. 1950), former Soviet biathlete
- Nikolay Kruglov Jr. (b. 1981), Russian biathlete and son of Nikolay Kruglov
- Sergei Kruglov (politician) (1907–1977), Soviet politician
- Sergei Kruglov (poet) (born 1966), Russian poet
- Sergei Kruglov (sport shooter) (born 1985), Russian Olympic sport shooter
- Larisa Kruglova (born 1972), Russian sprinter
- Yelena Kruglova (born 1962), Russian swimmer
