= Andrei Bely Prize =

Russian literary prize

Andrei Bely prize
- Established: 1978
- Awarded for: Literary achievements
- Status: Currently constituted

The Andrei Bely Prize (Russian: Премия Андрея Белого, romanized: Premiya Andreya Belovo) is the oldest independent literary prize awarded in Russia. It was established in 1978 by the staff of Hours, the largest samizdat literary journal in Leningrad, to recognize excellence in three categories: prose, poetry, and theory. Among its founders were Boris Ivanov, Boris Ostanin, Arkadii Dragomoshchenko, and other eminent figures of uncensored literature. The prize was named for Andrei Bely, whose influence spanned Russian poetry, prose, and humanitarianism.

Materially, the prize consisted of an apple, a single ruble, and a bottle of vodka. Despite its playful character, the prize quickly became a major phenomenon of Russian literary life, and was awarded to a number of significant writers, including novelists Andrei Bitov, Sasha Sokolov, and Yevgeny Kharitonov, poets Gennady Aygi, Olga Sedakova, and Elena Schwarz, philosopher Boris Groys, critic Mikhail Epstein, and Sinologist Vladimir Malyavin. After a lull in the early 1990s, it was revived in 1997 with the addition of a fourth category, "services to literature", and continues to be awarded to this day. Recent laureates have included Mikhail Gasparov, Vladimir Toporov, Margarita Meklina, Mikhail Gronas, Shamshad Abdullaev, Vladimir Sorokin, Victor Pelevin, Boris Dubin, Sergei Kruglov, Aleksandr Lavrov, Elena Fanailova and Aleksandra Petrova.

Boris Ostanin died on 22 September 2023, at the age of 76.
