= Russkaya Rech =

Russkaya Rech may refer to:

- Russkaya Rech (Moscow magazine), published in Moscow by Evgenia Tur in 1861-1862
- Russkaya Rech (Saint Petersburg magazine), published by Alexander Navrotsky in 1879-1882
