= Anzhelika Savchenko =

Ukrainian actress from 1999

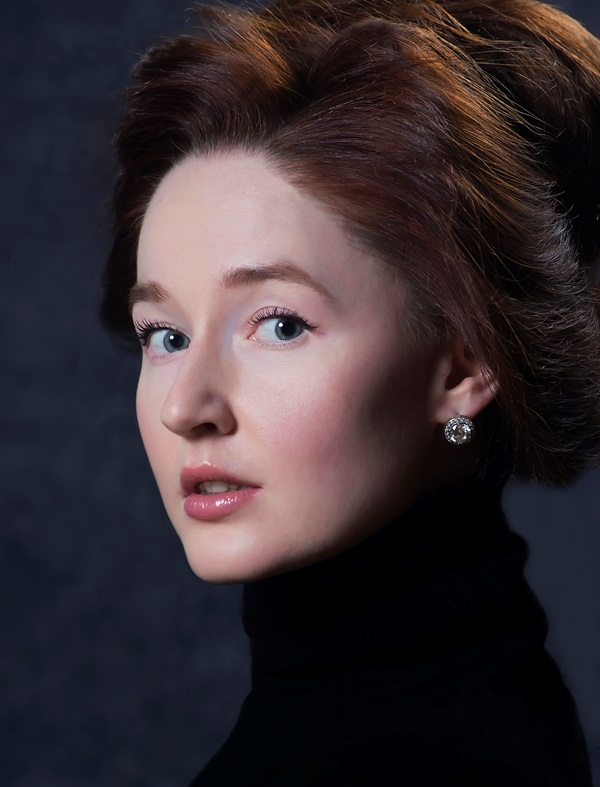
- Savchenko in 2012
- Born: 11 August 1982 (age 44); Dnipropetrovsk, Ukrainian Soviet Socialist Republic
- Education: Dnipro State College of Theatre and Arts
- Occupation: Actress
- Years active: 1999–present

Anzhelika Vitaliivna Savchenko (Ukrainian: Анжеліка Віталіївна Савченко, born 11 August 1982) is a Ukrainian theatre and film actress, and an artist of the Ivan Franko National Academic Drama Theater. She is a Merited and People's Artist of Ukraine.

== Biography ==
Savchenko was born in Dnipropetrovsk on 11 August 1982. In 1998, she enrolled in the Dnipropetrovsk State College of Theatre and Arts.

She played her first role as a second-year student in the Tennessee Williams play Sweet Bird of Youth, directed by Vadym Pinsky, playing the part of Helena on stage at the Gorky Theatre of Russian Drama and Comedy.

After graduating in 2002, she joined the Ivan Franko National Academic Drama Theatre, where she works to this day.

== Roles ==
=== Ivan Franko National Academic Drama Theatre ===
- Ladies and Hussars by Aleksander Fredro; dir. Yuri Odynoky as Miss Zosya
- Edith Piaf. Life on credit by Yu. Rybchinskyi and V. Vasalatiy; dir. Ihor Afanasyev as Simona
- Eric XIV by August Strindberg; dir. S. Moiseyev as Karin Monsdotter
- Living Corpse by Leo Tolstoy; dir. R. Marcholia as Sasha
- A wife is a wife by Anton Chekhov; dir. Valentyn Kozmenko-Delinde as Chorister, Maid
- Marriage by Nikolai Gogol; dir. Valentin Kozmenko-Delinde as Orina Panteleimonivna, aunt
- Cinderella Sh. Perot; dir. K. Chepura as Cinderella
- Richard III (2016) based on the play by William Shakespeare; dir. Avtandil Varsimashvili as Queen Elizaveta
- Three Comrades by Erich Maria Remarque; dir. Yuri Odynoky as Patricia Holman
- The Seagull by Anton Chekhov; dir. Valentin Kozmenko-Delinde as Nina Mykhailivna Zarechna
- The Tempest by William Shakespeare; dir. S. Maslobojshchikov as Miranda, Prospero's daughter
- Romances, Nostalgia O. Bilozuba as Flower girl
- Urus-Shaitan by I. Afanasyev as Galya
- Hysteria by Terry Johnson; dir. G. Gladiy as Jessica's mother
- Dream Hunters by M. Pavych as Princess Ateh
- The Brothers Karamazov by Fyodor Dostoevsky; dir. Yury Odynoky as Yulia
- Solo-miya O. Bilozuba as Woman
- Bremen Musicians H. Gladkov, Y. Entina as Princess
- Romeo and Juliet by William Shakespeare; dir. Valentin Kozmenko-Delinde as Juliet
- The one who fell from the sky Ihor Poklad, O. Vrataryova as Kylyna
- Stolen happiness by Ivan Franko; dir. Sergey Danchenko as Girl
- Kotygoroshko by Alexander Navrotsky as Olenka
- How not to love you, my Kyiv; dir. Oleksandr Bilozub as Singer
- The Kaidash Family by Ivan Nechuy-Levytsky, directed by Petro Ilchenko as Melashka
- The broken jar by Heinrich von Kleist; dir. R. Marholia as Eva
- The Idiot (2018) by Fyodor Dostoyevsky; dir. Yuri Odinoky as Anastasia Pylypivna Barashkova
- Verba (2019) based on the extravaganza drama "Forest Song" by Lesya Ukrainka; dir. Serhii Masloboyshchikov as Kylina, mother
- Cyrano de Bergerac (2020) based on the play by Edmond Rostand, dir. Yuri Odinoky as Roxana
- Peer Gynt (2021) based on the play by Henrik Ibsen; dir. Ivan Uryvsky as Solveig

== Filmography ==
- 2012 – Guitar lessons (miniseries) – Sveta
- 2012 – Anna German. Mystery of the White Angel (series)
- 2013 – Zhenskiy doctor 2 (series) – Vera Akimova
- 2013 – Bird in a Cage (miniseries)
- 2013 – The Bomb (series) – journalist
- 2019 – Only a miracle – Maria, Nika's wife, Anika and Severyn's mother
