= Margarita Meklina =

Russian short-story writer and novelist

Margarita Maratovna Meklina (Russian: Маргари́та Мара́товна Ме́клина; born in Leningrad) is a short story writer and novelist.

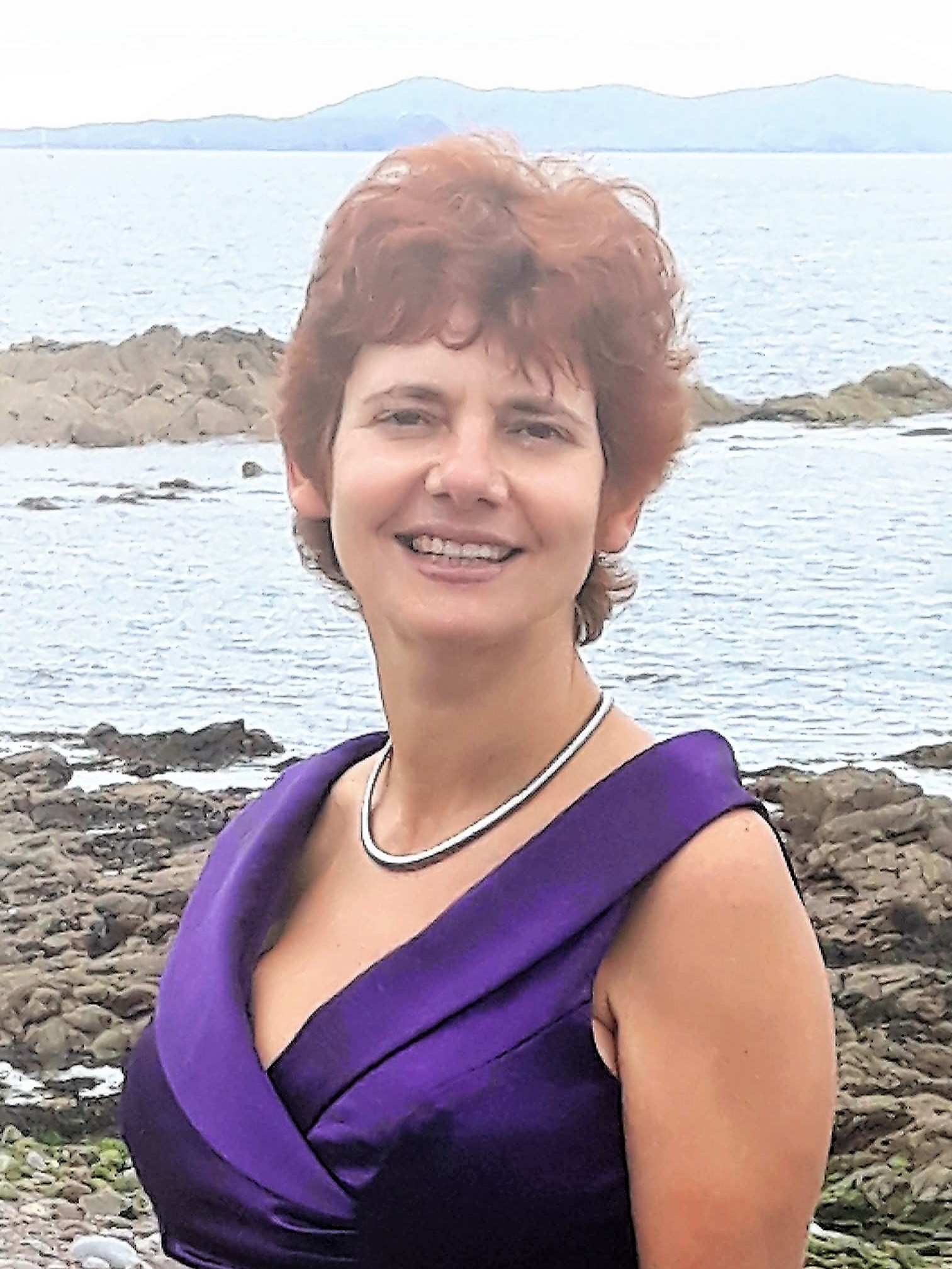
Writer Margarita Meklina at Roonagh Pier, near Inishturk island, Ireland, 2018

== Life and career ==
Margarita Meklina was born in Leningrad and now divides her life between Ireland and the San Francisco Bay Area. An author of ten books and a recipient of literary prizes in Russia, she has published widely in English and was named "the winner of the month" by Unmanned Press in San Francisco for her novella "Multiple Children." She was nominated for the Pushcart Prize by The Conium Review. In 2018, she was awarded The Aldanov Literary Prize for her novella Ulay in Lithuania that was inspired by her meeting with famous performance artist Ulay and his stories about the artworld. The Aldanov Literary Prize is conferred for the best novella or novelette authored by a Russian-language writer residing outside of Russia and is given by Novy Zhurnal.

She is widely recognized as a ground breaking writer from her cutting prose, which helped redefine Russian literature in the 1990s as it emerged from decades under the Soviet shadow. Her stories at that time, often built around themes of marginalized sexuality, combined with postmodernist and New Sincerity-like elements, created a new Russian lexicon in that genre. Some of them were translated into English, Italian, Spanish, French, Swedish and Japanese. In the past half decade she received recognition of that oeuvre, and for her subsequent work in fiction, with two major Russian literature prizes. Her collection of short stories, The Battle at St. Petersburg (Moscow, 2003,) received the prestigious Andrei Bely Prize in 2003, when she was the youngest recipient of the prize up to that date. The queer-themed volume of fiction, Love Has Four Hands (Moscow, 2008), and the volume, My Criminal Connection to Art, received the Russian Prize in 2009. Her creative collaboration with fellow Bely Prize-winner Arkadii Dragomoshchenko resulted in an animated collection of epistolary exchanges between them, published as POP3.

A devotee of conceptual art, Meklina shifted from post-modernism a lá Marina Abramović where she wrote as she lived and lived as she wrote, to a more sellable style in which active verbs, clarity and simplicity replaced "long-winded sentences, clatter of stones and nouns and overall foggy landscapes," in her words.

Much of Meklina's fiction in English explores diverse topics that circulate loosely around memory, creative collaboration and the bifurcated experience of the culturally displaced and reinvented. Her young adult novel, The Little Gaucho Who Loved Don Quixote, was a semi-finalist for a 2013 Amazon Breakthrough Novel Award.

Writes Dmitry Golynko, "Highly popular among the Russian intelligentsia is the prose of expatriate Margarita Meklina (b. 1972), currently living in San Francisco. Her book Srazhenie pod Peterburgom [The Battle of St. Petersburg], which was included in the New Literary Review's Soft Wave series edited by renowned critic Ilja Kukulin, received the 2003 Andrey Bely Award for its stylistic experimentalism and linguistic novelty. Meklina's prose "inspects" the hidden elements of the female psyche, which is shrouded to the outsider. Her stories formulate a female psyche (often concealed from societal strictures) through the symbiotic layering of the discursive worlds of dreams, culture, memory, and the dead. The woman's identity—which is unfixed and constantly changing—resembles the identity of an émigré: she is a stranger to both her native and adopted lands, regardless of its hospitality and comforts. The subjects of her prose, for example—a homosexual writer, a homeless gigolo who married a rich circus entertainer, Egyptian terrorists—are in essence symbols of phantomlike and fragile realities, observed through the eyes of a woman who is eternally unsure of her own identity and is trying to assert herself through each gesture or phrase. In Meklina's texts, a surrealistic phantasmagoria reminiscent of André Breton is tinged with utter skepticism and textual interplay, drawn from the novels of John Barth and Thomas Pynchon. Included in Srazhenie pod Peterburgom, the novel Izmena [Betrayal] is the heroine's lyric confession as she goes back and forth between her old lover Vakhid and younger husband Aldo, accentuating the question of how women perceive physiology (of sexual desire). In the traditional culture, the latter is either silenced or carefully studied through masculine reasoning; in Meklina's texts the emancipation of these very "physiological feelings" produce a more cultured outlook.

Writes Jenya Krein, "Meklina's prose is metaphysical in the way that she sees her world as in a fluid dream, where everything and everyone are interconnected, things and people, life and death, thoughts and outcomes, desires and reality. She writes the way one would write if he were perfecting the art of an essay. But the five paragraph rule becomes the many words rule, where she is stringing her syllables and sounds as if creating a new language. If she was not a prose writer, she could have been a poet, like her pen friend Arkadii Dragomoshchenko, being so acutely aware of the sound and rhythms of written words. She repeats, clearly exasperated, that she is tired of being compared to Nabokov; she is her own writer. But Meklina knows all too well what exactly she is doing when she is doing it. It is a flattering and important comparison, and she explores it, but with as much sincerity as the text allows her. What she writes about is dislocation, displacement from self, from the world around us, from the ever changing society that never really changes enough to gratify our inner need for acceptance and connection. She writes about a human soul that is trapped in a strange world and in even stranger body which has cravings that are never completely satisfied.

Meklina matriculated in the philology faculty of the Russian Pedagogical University in Saint Petersburg. She settled in California following her immigration to the United States in 1994 but subsequently moved to Europe. In the end of 2022, following the expansion of the anti-LGBTQ+ laws, Meklina's earlier book, written in collaboration with Lida Yusupova, “Love Has Four Hands,” was removed from Russian bookstores. Her new collection of short stories was supposed to be published in Moscow but is now subjected to self-censorship by the publishing house’s lawyers afraid to be penalized for publishing queer content.

== Select bibliography ==
- "Crossing the Atlantic (After Walt Whitman)" A poem in an anthology The Experiment Will Not Be Bound, January 2023.
- "We Are Worthless" The Brooklyn Rail/InTranslation, 1 June 2019.
- "From Russia, with Longing: Gay Writing and censorship of Roskomnadzor" The Cardiff Review, 11 October 2018.
- "Memories of the Jewish Diaspora: The Rich Heritage of Jews in Ireland" RTÉ Culture, 17 August 2017.
- "A Sauce Stealer" Spuyten Duyvil, New York, 2017.
- "The Little Gaucho Who Loved Don Quixote" Black Wolf Edition & Publishing, Scotland, November 2016.
- "Parataxis and Ponzi Schemes: Margarita Meklina and Snežana Žabić with Andrea Scrima" The Brooklyn Rail, July–August 2015
- "Randy Raccoons: The Threat To Russia's Youth" The Brooklyn Rail, September, 2014
- "Numbers" Cumberland River Review, 2013
- "The Loneliness of the Long Distance Winner" Quarterly Conversation, 2009
- "Soviet Mammoth: Vassily Aksyonov" Words Without Borders, 2009
- "An Infinite Loop" Trout, 2002
