= Shamshad Abdullaev =

Russian-language Uzbek poet (1957–2024)

- Шамшад Маджитович Абдуллаев Uzbek
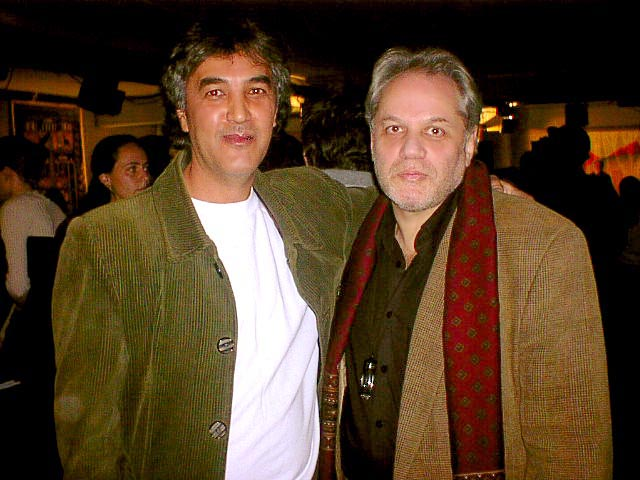
- Born: 1 November 1957; Fergana, Uzbek SSR, USSR
- Died: 23 October 2024 (aged 66); Almaty, Kazakhstan
- Education: Fergana Pedagogical institute (1979)
- Occupations: Poet, essayist, author
- Writing career
- Language: Russian
- Years active: 1987–2024
- Genre: Social poetry
- Notable work: The Gap Slow Summer Three Poems

Shamshad Majitovich Abdullaev (Russian: Шамшад Маджитович Абдуллаев, 1 November 1957, Fergana, Uzbek Soviet Socialist Republic – 23 October 2024, Almaty, Kazakhstan) was an Uzbek poet, essayist, writer, and translator who wrote in Russian. He was the founder of the Fergana Poetry School.

From 1991 to 1995, Abdullaev was also the final editor‑in‑chief of the Tashkent‑based poetry journal Star of the East (Zvezda Vostoka). His first poetry collection, entitled The Gap, was published in Saint Petersburg, Russia, by the local magazine Mitin. The Gap received critical acclaim and won Abdullaev the prestigious Andrei Bely Prize in 1994.

Abdullaev was a contributor to Words Without Borders, where he published several of his poems: 'On the Death of Jean Vigo', 'Midday 1975', and 'Family', all originally written in Russian.

== Early life ==
Abdullaev was born on 1 November 1957 in Fergana, then part of the Uzbek Soviet Socialist Republic. He attended the local Fergana Pedagogical Institute, graduating in 1979 with a degree in Russian literature.

== Career ==
=== Early career ===
Abdullaev attended the Fergana Pedagogical Institute from 1975 to 1979, where he specialised in Russian literature. In the early 1990s, he moved to Tashkent shortly before the collapse of the Soviet Union and found employment at a local paper, Star of the East (Zvezda Vostoka). Founded in 1932 by the Uzbek Communist Party, the magazine published literary and poetic anthologies by Uzbek writers. In 1991, Abdullaev became the editor‑in‑chief of the magazine's poetry section. The magazine experienced modest local success; however, Abdullaev's work soon began gaining international recognition.

In 1992, Abdullaev published his first collection of poems, Intermediate (Russian: Промежуток). The book, which incorporates strands of modernism with utopianism as well as Soviet and Central Asian mythological symbolism, received widespread acclaim in Uzbekistan, Russia, and much of the post‑Soviet world, where it was lauded for its use of modernism in a distinctly Central Asian style.

In 1994, he had a breakthrough with his book of poetry The Gap, which received widespread circulation and attention in the Russophone world.

That year he was recognised with the Andrei Bely Prize, becoming the first writer from Uzbekistan to win Russia's most prestigious unofficial literary award.

This resulted in backlash from more traditional communist segments of Uzbekistan's population, as well as the emerging nationalist faction of Uzbek poets, who were dismayed by his use of Russian. As a result, Abdullaev was forced to resign from his position as editor‑in‑chief at Zvezda Vostoka in 1995.

=== Recognition abroad ===
After leaving Zvezda Vostoka, Abdullaev began publishing his poetry outside Uzbekistan, notably in Russia. His poems were published in a number of independent Russian literary journals, including the St Petersburg‑based Mitin and the Yekaterinburg‑based Ural Novye.

In 1997, Abdullaev self‑published a collection of poems, Slow Summer (Russian: медленное лето). The book received critical acclaim in Russia and won Abdullaev the Banner Magazine Prize in 1998. Also in 1997, Abdullaev published a Russian‑Finnish anthology entitled Who Says (Russian: Кто говорит), which dealt with the cultural relationship between the two nations. It was compiled and translated by Y. Mullinen. These compilations won Abdullaev the Banner Magazine Prize, awarded by the Russian literary magazine Znamya in 1998.

In 2003, Abdullaev published his fourth book of poetry, Fixed Surface.

=== International Collaborations ===
In 2012, Abdullaev, along with other writers including Fanny Rubio and Rainer Maria Rilke, was featured in a poetry compilation, Two Lines 19: Passageways. The compilation, published by the Center for the Art of Translation, features various poems from authors around the world sharing their unique experiences.

In 2015, Abdullaev participated in 'Your Language My Ear', an international poetry symposium dedicated to Russian poetry in translation, held at the University of Pennsylvania. He appeared alongside Polina Barskova, Keti Chukhrov, Alexandra Petrova, and Aleksandr Skidan, as well as a number of other important translators. Several of Abdullaev's poems translated at this event have since been published in English.

In April 2017, Abdullaev collaborated with Words Without Borders' online magazine to release three new poems, translated by Alex Cigale and Dana Golin, respectively.

== Fergana School ==
Abdullaev was the founder and most prominent poet of the so‑called Fergana School of poetry, which is based in his hometown. He founded the school in 1990, along with fellow Uzbek poets Hamid Ismailov and Hamdam Zakirov.

Despite being located in Uzbekistan, the school primarily publishes poetry in Russian. Abdullaev said that the reason he did not publish more poems in the Uzbek language was because he viewed his poems as forms of intercultural dialogue between post‑Soviet peoples. His poems can be best described as contrasting the cultures, customs, and nuances of Central Asia with distinctively Western principles and theories, in the hope of creating a dialogue between the two different cultures. The declarative function of the Fergana School is to start a 'neutral dialogue' between East and West with poetry that speaks to both sides.

=== Reception ===
The Fergana school appealed to a constructed prehistory of European and American modernist and avant-garde contexts, interwoven with Central Asian cultural traditions from the deep past of Islamic culture, to more recent semiofficial and underground writing of the Soviet era. This visionary project was meant to bring together the Russian literary language, Central Asian collective identities and pasts, and cosmopolitan world culture.

-Kevin M.F. Platt

Abdullaev's poetry in particular has received praise outside Russia. It has been described as 'cinematic', 'utopian', and 'avant‑garde'.

In his article 'The World's Central Asian Heart: The Poetry of Shamshad Abdullaev', Kevin M. F. Platt described Abdullaev's poetry as 'dense' and 'roving', while lauding the poet for his combination of sensuality and materialism in his work.

However, Abdullaev's work has also generated considerable controversy within Uzbekistan. It was heavily criticised by the Uzbek government, particularly during the presidency of Islam Karimov. In the 1990s, the government‑backed writers' union accused Abdullaev of attempting to hinder the development of the Uzbek language through his use of Russian, as well as undermining Central Asian culture.

== Personal life and death ==
An ethnic Uzbek, Abdullaev lived his whole life in Fergana, with a brief period of residency in Tashkent when he worked at Zvezda Vostoka. He was an accomplished polyglot, fluent in both Uzbek and Russian, as well as conversational English.

Abdullaev died from cancer on 23 October 2024, at the age of 67.

== Honours and awards ==
- Andrei Bely Prize (1994)
- Znamya Prize (1998)
- Russian Prize of the Boris Yeltsin Centre (2006, 2013)
- Joseph Brodsky Memorial Fellowship Fund, American Academy in Rome (resident, 2015)

== See also ==
- Hamid Ismailov
- List of Russian-language poets
