= Kerry Shawn Keys =

American poet

Kerry Shawn Keys (born June 25, 1946 in Harrisburg, Pennsylvania, USA) is an American poet, writer, playwright and translator. He is a citizen of the United States and Lithuania.

== Roots and early life ==
Keys was born 25 June 1946 in Harrisburg, Pennsylvania, USA. His father worked as a plumber and sold kitchen supplies. His mother was of mixed English, Scottish and Irish ancestry, and was a housewife and clerk typist. Athletics and music were an important part of the household. As a child, Keys spent a good deal of time fishing and hunting with his father, and tramping the mountains around their family hunting cabin near Pine Grove Furnace State Park and Fuller Lake. Keys often mentions the Blue Mountains, and these outdoor activities, as an influence on his poetry.

Keys attended racially mixed inner city public schools. Soul music, bluesy rock, "hillbilly" tunes, and especially jazz all combined to influence Keys's poetry. Another influence from this period was the Sunday sermons of Christ Lutheran's minister, Pastor Rudisill.

== Profession ==
In 1964, Keys attended the University of Pennsylvania in Philadelphia on several scholarships given partly as a result of a new "quota" system the Ivy League institution was using to recruit "Colored folk" and the economically disadvantaged. He took a leave-of-absence after his sophomore year (1968) and joined the Peace Corps for a two-year stint as an agricultural assistant in the south of India in the town of Devarakonda near Hyderabad. Here he read dozens of books and after reading García Lorca, Valéry's essays, and Tagore decided to become a poet. He also delved into Hindu religion and philosophy. And at this time the seeds were planted for his polyphonic epic poem, "A Gathering of Smoke", first published by P. Lal in Calcutta, and later by Three Continents Press in Washington, D.C., in 1986. Returning to Penn in 1968, he majored in English literature and took his B.A. in 1970. During those final two years, Keys was influenced by reading English-language poets particularly Shakespeare, Donne, Keats, Dylan Thomas, Yeats, Wallace Stevens, and especially Pound's Cantos. Other major influences at this formative time were Joyce, Jung, Pablo Neruda, Whitehead, Nagarjuna, Thoreau, Chuang-Tzu, and Bachelard and Husserl. After graduation, the poet lived in Center City, Philadelphia for two years. He began to read poets of the 1950s and 1960s, many in the anthology Naked Poetry, and in Robert Bly's literary journal, The Fifties and The Sixties. Of considerable importance were Gary Snyder and W. S. Merwin and early Robert Lowell, Ted Hughes, and Antonio Machado. During this time, Willis Barnstone's Modern European Poetry Anthology became a reference for further reading, and spurred Keys on to enroll in graduate school at Indiana University at Bloomington, Indiana, where Barnstone taught. Shortly before matriculating, Keys married Ann Fletcher James, a Temple student from the Harrowgate/Fishtown area of Philadelphia. While at Bloomington, Keys became close friends with the poet, Robert Bringhurst. He was perhaps the only contemporary to exert an influence on Keys’ poetics other than the poet, Michael Jennings. Keys earned his M.A. in English Literature in 1973.

In 1973, Keys returned to Pennsylvania determined to write poetry and do little else. Bringhurst joined him briefly after inaugurating Kanchenjunga Press with his first book of poems, The Shipwright's Log (1972). The next book published was Keys’ Swallowtails Gather These Stones (1973). That was soon followed by Keys’ second book of poems, Jade Water (1974), designed and published by Bringhurst. Failing to attract the attention of major publishing houses, Keys resorted to publishing his own material. From the early 70s to the mid–80s, Keys and Bringhurst maintained an extensive correspondence now housed in Keys' archives at Dickinson College in Carlisle, where he was an honorary Associate Fellow for 12 years, and at the National Library of Canada in Ottawa, Ontario. It was Keys who first brought Bringhurst to Gary Snyder's attention; Bringhurst wrote a foreword to his reissued study of a Haida myth, He Who Hunted Birds in His Father's Village (2007). Robert Bly also visited the poet at this time and encouraged him to move to Brazil, a move that Keys and his wife were already planning. From 1974 to 1978, he lived in Rio de Janeiro, teaching, translating, and writing poetry. While in Rio, Keys became friends with Carangola and Lêdo Ivo and soon began translating Ivo and João Cabral de Melo Neto who were published by New Directions. Some years later a selected collection of Lêdo Ivo's poems, Landsend (1998), was published by Keys’ Pine Press. He also organized and edited a bilingual anthology of contemporary North American poetry, Quingumbo, published in São Paulo.

In 1977, Keys and his wife returned to Pennsylvania where he lived for nearly two decades. He spent two more years in Brazil (Salvador). In 1983–84 he did research on African-Brazilian liturgy on a Senior Fulbright grant. At the behest of the Brazilian novelist, Jorge Amado, Keys resided in the neighborhood of Rio Vermelho. During that time, the Keys divorced and remarried the Bahian, Valdenice dos Reis Almeida—"Ziza". He published many collections of his poetry during this period. They covered a variety of themes including: India, Brazil, the Tao Te Ching, flamenco, Central America and the Pennsylvania hill country. In these poems, Keys continues his phenomenological and lyrical exploration of Dasein in regard to etymology, rapture, and metaphor. Like Auden and other prolific poets, Keys writes songs, light verse, limericks, pithy satiric squibs, erotica;, ideograms, haiku, epigrams, parodies, and enigmatic epiphanies and riddles. His prose wonderscripts and plays are dense, and often dark and absurd. His children's books verge on fables.

From the early 70s to the mid-90s Keys' relationship with the artist and flamenco guitarist, Frank Rush Miller (Paco de Nada) was important. They were close colleagues and friends, lived together for a while, and on occasion performed in tandem in Pennsylvania, Spain, Central America, and Brazil. Another important link was his friend, the poet Gerald Stern, beginning in the mid-70s. Stern, came to live in rural Perry County at Keys’ invitation, and wrote many poems evoking the landscape, such as the much anthologized poem, "Nice Mountain" which visits the "great open space" that Keys homesteaded. Other poets who became close during this time included J. C. Todd (Jane Todd Cooper) and Craig Czury. Keys also gained a reputation as a reader of poetry, performing for academic and café-bar scene audiences. He was the American Poet-in-Residence at the Iowa International Writing Program for two semesters, and also worked then (and now) as a cultural and language facilitator for international visitors from abroad. Keys divorced again in the mid-1980s and then lived for some half-dozen years with the singer-songwriter, and textile artist, Janet Pellam "invented" a method of binding Pine Press books using a Singer sewing machine with the poet. In 1992, he received the Robert H. Winner Memorial Award from the Poetry Society of America. During the 70s and 80s, Keys occasionally taught English literature, grammar, composition and poetry at Penn State University, Harrisburg Area Community College (where he co-founded and co-directed the Wildwood Poetry Festival) and Dickinson College.

With no health insurance and a severe injury to his leg and back while felling trees, Keys began toying with idea of a move to Europe. He visited Croatia and what was then Czechoslovakia. He was soon spending considerable time in Olomouc with the Czech poet Petr Mikeš. In 1996 he journeyed to Wrocław to visit the Polish poet, Urszula Kozioł, and then on to visit Leszek Engelking, a poet and Pound and Nabokov's Polish translator, living near Warsaw. There he met and established a close relationship with Mexican expat poet, Gerardo Beltrán (Zorro) and with Lithuanian poet, Kornelijus Platelis (Zapata). They later became known as the Three Z's, Keys having been dubbed with the sobriquet, Zopi, in Tela by the Garifuna community. He moved to Vilnius in 1998 to teach translation theory and creative composition for two years as Fulbright professor at Vilnius University and Vilnius Pedagogical University. He producing "Singer"-sewn books for Pine Press with the budding Lithuanian Press, Vario Burnos, under the direction of the book-designer Tomas Butkus. Younger Lithuanians were introduced to books by Tomaž Šalamun, Charles Bukowski, Vytautas Blože, João Cabral de Melo Neto, Michael Jennings, Brian Young, Bill Shields, J. C. Todd, Craig Czury, Hailji, and others. He also held poetry readings at his Hermescort Saloon-Salon. The poet was married for a brief time to the Lithuanian presidential archival photographer, Džoja Barysaite.

From 1998 to the present, Keys has lived for the most part in Vilnius, publishing, editing, translating from Lithuanian and Portuguese, and writing poetry, plays, children's books, and wonderscripts. Two books of his poetry—one a bilingual, selected, Vultures’ Country, and the other, Tao te ching Meditations, Bones & Buzzards—were published in the Czech Republic, assisted by Czech poet, Petr Mikeš. Two books in Lithuanian with commentary by poets Kornelijus Platelis and Sigitas Geda were also published. Keys' chapbook and book translations of Lithuanian poets include works by: Eugenijus Ališanka, Sonata Paliulytė, Jonas Jackevičius, Sigitas Geda, Laurynas Katkus, and others. Keys has helped to produce Lithuanian-English editions of Selected Poems, The Banks of Noon, by Emily Dickinson (translated by Sonata Paliulytė), and Selected Poems of Menke Katz' English-language poems, collaborating with Menke's son, the Yiddish scholar Dovid Katz. At the same time he published books in America: one with the Virtual Artists Collective, and three with Presa S Press. The most recent include Transporting (2010), with cover artwork by the Paris-based Brazilian painter, Gonçalo Ivo, whose artwork is also found on Pine Press books from the 90s, and a book of poems, Night Flight, 2012. Since the mid-90s, Keys’ poems and translations have been published in European journals and in the USA. By deconstructing his own poems, he has performed throughout Europe and Russia with the Russian/Lithuanian free-jazz percussionist and constellation artist, Vladimir Tarasov. They released a CD with Prior Records in 2006. Recently he performed as Biblical Chronicler and Speaker in Tarasov's and Frido Mann's multimedia project, The Flood, and has also ventured into voicing an interactive audio-e book for children, Strawberry Day, by Kestutis Kasparavičius. He has received translation and book-art laureates in Lithuania and is a member of the Lithuanian Writers Union and PEN. He was the Writer in Residence for SLS Lithuania for several years. Keys is also the World Ambassador to Poetry from the Republic of Užupis, and maintained and wrote the "Dispatch" literary column from the Republic for Poetry International, SD. He resides in Vilnius with the Lithuanian poet, translator, and former actress, Sonata Paliulytė, and their two children.

== Bibliography ==
=== Books of original work ===
- Shoelaces For Chagall, Selected Love Poems, Bübül Verlag, Berlin, 2021, ISBN 978-3-946807-32-2
- Black Ice, poems, Black Spruce Press, 2020
- Mouse and Missy, children's book, scheduled for 2018 publication in Lithuanian, Writers’ Union Press, Lithuania (title in Lithuanian undecided)
- Sich einen Fluss verschaffen, bilingual English/German poems, tr by Ron Winkler, hochroth Verlag, Wiesenburg, 2017 ISBN 978-3-902871-96-1
- Pienas, tales and plays, Kitos Knygos, Vilnius, 2013
- CD with Vladimir Tarasov, Sonatina (Tango T), Texts: Gerardo Beltrán. Voices: Gerardo Beltrán; Dmitry Prigov; Arturas Valionis, Kitos Knygos, Druskininkai/Vilnius, 2009
- Night Flight, poems, Presa: S: Press, Michigan, 2012
- Transporting, a cloak of rhapsodies, poems, Presa: S : Press, Michigan, 2010
- Book of Beasts, a Bestiary, poems, Presa: S : Press, Michigan, 2009
- The Burning Mirror, poems, Presa :S : Press, Michigan, 2008
- The Land Of People; and Žmoniu Šalis (Lithuanian edition), children's book with artwork by the author and Ann James Costello, Kronta Press, Vilnius, 2007
- CD with Vladimir Tarasov and featuring Dmitry Prigov and others, poetry and percussion, Baltic Optical Disc, Prior Records, Vilnius, 2006
- Broken Circle, poems, Virtual Artists Collective, www.vacteam.com, Chicago, 2005
- Blue Rose Fusion, a selection of poems and prose for teachers, American Embassy, Berlin, 2004
- Conversations With Tertium Quid, poems, Lithuanian Writers Union Press, Vilnius, 2003
- Tao te ching Meditations, Bones and Buzzards, Periplum Press, Olomouc, Czech Republic, 2003
- The Miraculous Veteran, prose, Pacobooks, 2003
- Corresponding Voices (5 poets presentation), Point of Contact Productions, Syracuse, 2002
- Inclusions, poems, Vario Burnos Press, Klaipėda, 2002
- In the Pouring Rain, Gopiah's Tamil Poems, Pine Press, 2002.
- Return Of The Bird, prose, Pacobooks, 2002
- Pavlov's Duck, prose, Pacobooks, 2001
- Menulio Smukle (Pub of the Moon), Selected Poems in Lithuanian, tr. Eugenijus Alisanka, Vaga Press, 1999.
- The Festival of Familiar Light, poems, circa 1980s, Pine Press, 1998.
- Sorrows of an Old Worder, letter-poem, Pine Press, 1998.
- Moon Shining the Millennium, poems, Pine Press, 1998.
- Ch’antscapes, poems, Pine Press, 1998
- Turning the Mask, poems, Pine Press, 1997
- Krishna's Karma, poems, Pacobooks, 1997
- Beastings, drawings, with poems by Frank Miller, Pacobooks, 1997
- Ratoons, a theatre-dance piece in verse, Formant Press, Prague, 1996
- Narrow Passage To The Deep Light, poems, Pine Press, 1996
- The Nearing Notebooks, poems, co-authored with John Burns, Pine Press, 1996
- Blues in Green, the Brazilian Poems, Pine Press, 1996
- Flamenco Songs, poems and songs, Pine Press, 1995
- Warm Springs, poems, Pine Press, 1995
- Krajina Supu/Vultures’ Country (Selected Poems in Czech and English), tr. Petr Mikeš, Votobia, Olomouc, 1996
- Decoy's Desire, poems, Pennywhistle Press, Santa Fe, 1993
- Fingerlings, 1993; Fingerlings 2, 1994, poems, Warm Spring Press
- The Hearing, poems, Warm Spring Press, 1992
- A Gathering of Smoke, Gopiah's South Indian Prose-Poem Journals, Writers Workshop Editions, Calcutta, 1986; Three Continents Press, Washington, D.C., 1989
- Seams, poems, Formant Press, design Robert Bringhurst, Vancouver and San Francisco, 1985
- Loose Leaves Fall, Selected Poems, Pine Press, 1977.
- Jade Water, poems and a one-act play, design Robert Bringhurst, Kanchenjunga Press, 1974
- Swallowtails Gather These Stones, poems, Kanchenjunga Press, publisher Robert Bringhurst, 1973

=== Translations ===
- We Could Not But Resist Genocide, memoirs of an ordinary partisan (Bronius Kemeklis-Kerštas),

     translated by Dalia Šatienė and editor-(translator), Kerry Shawn Keys, Genocide and Resistance Research Centre of Lithuania, 2020      

- New Poetry from China, 1917-2017, translated by Ming Di and Kerry Shawn Keys with additional translations by others, Black Square Editions, NYC, 2018
- Voices and Things of Samogitia: Jewellery, figurines, Poetry; Žemaitijos balsai ir daiktai: juvelyrika, mažoji plastika by Eglė Čėjauskaitė-Gintalė; co-translated with Sonata Paliulytė and Judita Gliauberzonaitė; Išleido VšĮ “Porta artis”, 2017
- From Gangs to Saints, Sanjayananda, E-Book, co-translated with Kristina Guzauskyte, Balboa Press, 2016
- Solemia, science fiction novel, Martynas Domeika, co-translation with Kristina Guzauskyte, Lithuanian into English, Kindle Editions, 2015
- New Cathay: Contemporary Chinese Poetry, 1990-2012, contributing translator, Tupelo Press, 2013
- Lithuanian Holocaust Atlas, compiled by Milda Jakulytė-Vasil, English-language editor and translation assistant, Kerry Shawn Keys, published by Vilna Gaon State Jewish Museum, 2011
- Bootleg Copy, selected poems of Laurynas Katkus, Virtual Artists Collective, Chicago, 2011
- Still Life, selected poems of Sonata Paulyte, co-translation with Irena Praitis, Calder Wood Press, Scotland, 2011
- Requiem, Ledo Ivo, poem, chapbook size, from the Portuguese, thedrunkenboat.com, on-line journal, 2011
- Life and Unbelief, (Gyvybe ir netikejimas), poems, Vytautas Kaziela, Lithuanian/English, Chapbook, 2009
- A Bug In The Brain (Vabalas Smegenineje), poems, Jonas Jackevičius, translation from Lithuanian with Judita Glauberzonaite, Vaga Press, Vilnius, 2007
- The Yellow Insect (Geltonas Vabzdys), a selection of poems, Jonas Jackevičius, translation from Lithuanian with Judita Glauberzonaite, Diemedzio Publishing, Vilnius, 2005
- Selected Poems of Sigitas Geda, Biopsy of Winter, translation from Lithuanian, Vaga Press, 2002
- Six Young Lithuanian Poets, translations from Lithuanian, Vaga Press, 2002
- Eugenijus Ališanka, A Selection, translation from Lithuanian, Frankfurt Chapbooks, Lithuanian Post-Samizdat Publishing, Klaipėda House of Artists, 2002
- October Holidays and other poems, Laurynas Katkus, translation from Lithuanian, Vario Burnos Press, 2001
- Landsend, Selected Poems of Ledo Ivo, translation from Portuguese, Pine Press, 1998.
- In the Tracks of the Dead, tr. with Wanda Boeke from Czech, poems of Petr Mikeš, Pine Press, 1993
- Death and Life of Severino the Migrant, translation from Portuguese of João Cabral de Melo Neto's verse-play, Morte E Vida Severino, manuscript
- A Knife All Blade, translation of João Cabral de Melo Neto's poem, Uma facá so lamina, Pine Press and New Directions Anthology, 1982.
- O Pintor e o Poeta, The Painter and the Poet, Jose Paulo Moreira Da Fonseca, poems and paintings, bilingual Portuguese-English presentation, Spala Press, Rio de Janeiro, 1976
- Editing, organizing, and/or English Language Editing or Partial Translation of Books:
  - Čiurlionis In Vilnius, Kronta Press, 2010
  - Vytautas Valius, Tapyba (Paintings), Vilnius Academy of Art Press, co-translation, 2010
  - Vytautas Valius, Estampai Knygu grafika Sienu tapyba ( Prints Book Graphics Wall Paintings), Vilnius Academy of Art Press, co- translation, 2010
  - Algis Skačkauskas, Tapyba (Paintings), Vilnius Art Academy catalog, co-translation, 2010
  - Selected Poems of Menke Katz from the English poems, bilingual English and Lithuanian, Versus Aureus, Vilnius, 2008.
  - Petronele Gerlikiene, Tapestries/Painting, English Language Editor, Union of Lithuanian Folk Art, 2005
  - Veiled Kiss, Selected Poems of Menna Elfyn, bilingual English and Lithuanian, Preamble and English Language Editor, Vaga Press, 2005
  - The Spirit of Nature by Romualdas Neimantas, a comparative text on Japanese and Lithuanian culture and ecology, English Language Editor, Tyto Alba Press, 2004
  - Algis Griškevičius, Paintings Objects Photographs, bilingual presentation, co-translation, English Language Editor, Kultūras barai Press, 2004
  - With A Needle In The Heart, memoirs of former prisoners of Ghettos and Concentration Camps, English Language Editor and partial translator, Genocide and Resistance Research Center of Lithuania, 2003
  - Quingumbó, Nova Poesia Norte-Americana, bilingual anthology, Editora Escrita, São Paulo, 1980.

== Notable awards ==
- Writer's Stipend, Lithuanian Ministry of Culture, 2020

International Best Translator 2018 Award from The International Poetry, Translation, and Research Centre, (IPTRC), Chongqing City, China Chevalier of the Order of the Silver Garlic Bullet, Republic of Užupis, 2018 DJS Translation Award, 2012, New Cathay: Contemporary Chinese Poetry 1990-2012, Tupelo Press Laureate 2007, Land of People, children's book, award for artwork by the Vilnius Art Academy; Union of Artists of Lithuania; and Ministry of Culture. Artwork, Ann James Costello and the author. Writer's Stipend, Lithuanian Ministry of Culture, 2007-2008; 2013

- National Endowment for the Arts Literature Fellowship, USA, 2005
- Poet-Laureate Translator for translation of a book from Lithuanian into a foreign language, Writers Union, Lithuania, 2003
- World Ambassador for Poetry, Republic of Uzupis, 2002–indefinite
- Fulbright Lecturer in Lithuania, Associate Professor, Vilnius University, Vilnius Pedagogical University, 1998—1999; 1999—2000.
- Poetry Society Of America, Robert H. Winner Memorial Award, 1992, poem meditations on the Tao.
- Senior Research Fulbright Grant, Salvador, Bahia, Brazil, 1983—1984.
