= Libina =

- Municipality
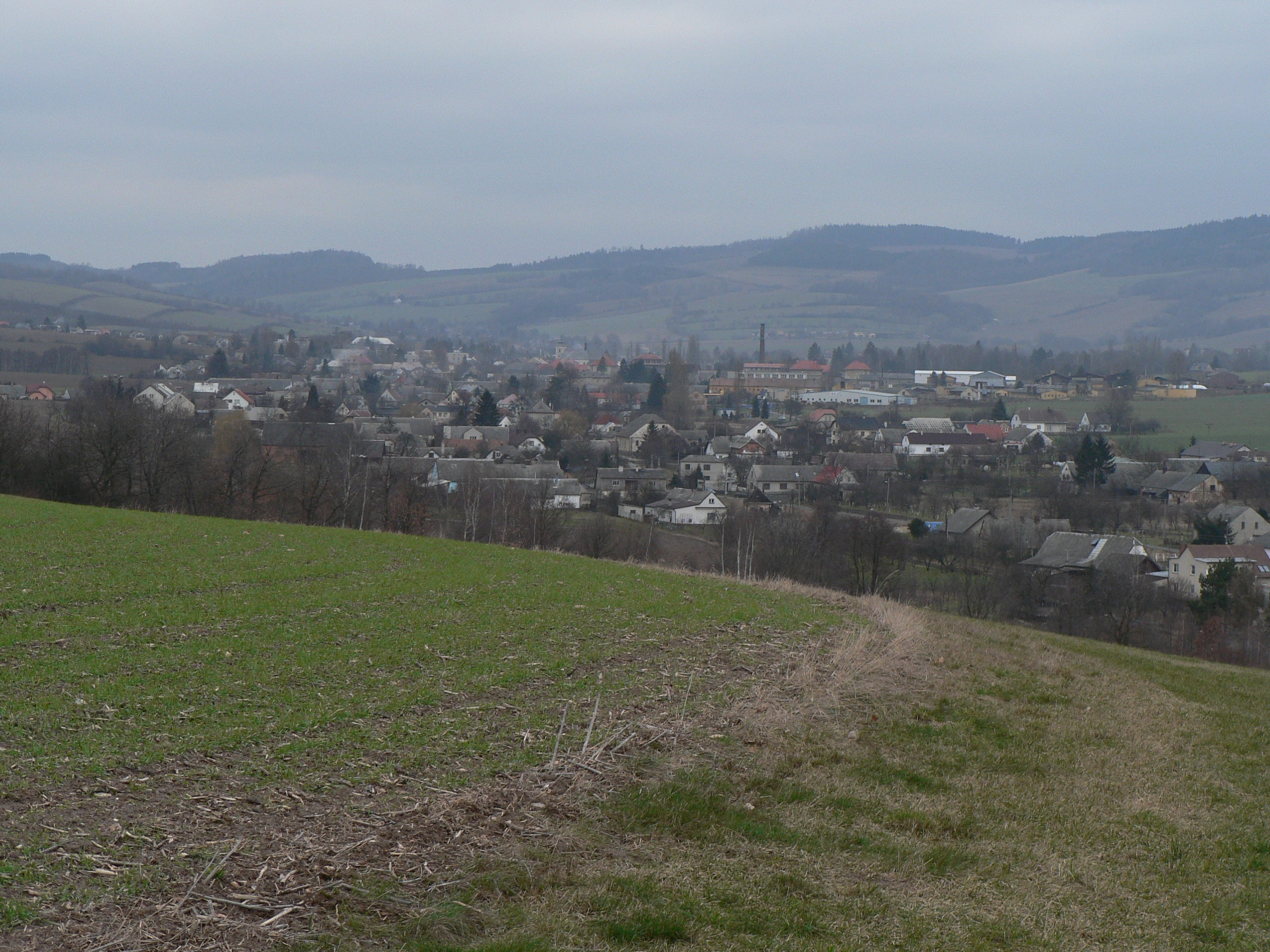
- View of Libina

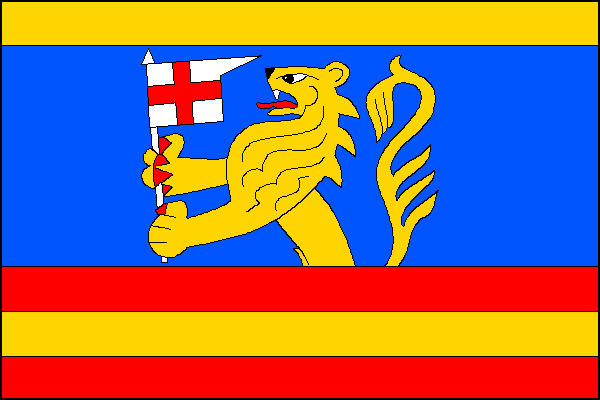
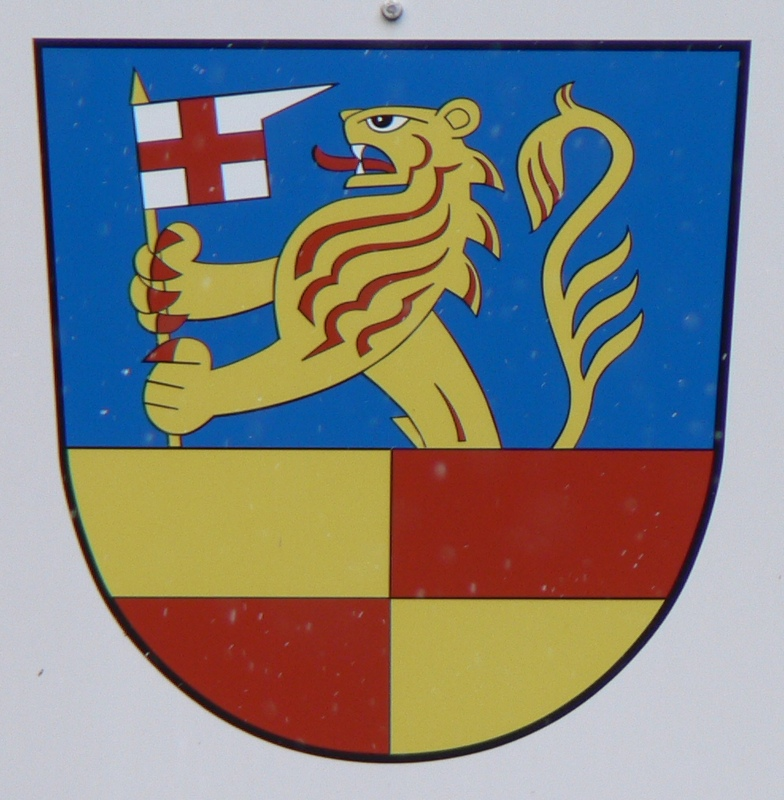
- Flag Coat of arms

- Location in the Czech Republic
- Coordinates: 49°52′35″N 17°4′58″E
- Country: Czech Republic
- Region: Olomouc
- District: Šumperk
- First mentioned: 1358

Area
  - Total: 27.26 km^{2} (10.53 sq mi)
- Elevation: 269 m (883 ft)

Population (2026-01-01)
  - Total: 3,230
  - Density: 118/km^{2} (307/sq mi)
- Time zone: UTC+1 (CET)
  - Summer (DST): UTC+2 (CEST)
- Postal code: 788 05
- Website: www.ou-libina.cz

Libina (Czech pronunciation: [ˈlɪbɪna]; German: Liebau) is a municipality and village in Šumperk District in the Olomouc Region of the Czech Republic. It has about 3,200 inhabitants.

== Administrative division ==
Libina consists of three municipal parts (in brackets population according to the 2021 census):

- Libina (2,472)
- Dolní Libina (517)
- Obědné (161)

== Geography ==
Libina is located about 12 kilometres (7 mi) southeast of Šumperk and 33 km (21 mi) north of Olomouc. The municipal territory lies mostly in the Hanušovice Highlands, however, the built-up area is located in the northernmost tip of the Upper Morava Valley. The highest point is the hill Mladoňovský vrch at 547 m (1,795 ft) above sea level.

== History ==
Libina was probably founded in the second half of 13th century. The first written mention of Libina is from 1358. In the 14th, 15th and 16th centuries, it was owned by noble families of Sternberg, Cymburk and Zierotin. In 1568, Bedřich the Elder of Zierotin sold the village to the town of Uničov.

== Demographics ==
Historical population

Year	Pop.	±%
1869	6,002	—
1880	6,109	+1.8%
1890	6,207	+1.6%
1900	6,170	−0.6%
1910	6,050	−1.9%

Year	Pop.	±%
1921	5,080	−16.0%
1930	5,475	+7.8%
1950	3,694	−32.5%
1961	3,894	+5.4%
1970	3,627	−6.9%

Year	Pop.	±%
1980	3,647	+0.6%
1991	3,413	−6.4%
2001	3,482	+2.0%
2011	3,364	−3.4%
2021	3,150	−6.4%

Source: Censuses

== Transport ==
Libina is located on the railway line Šumperk–Vyškov via Olomouc.

== Sights ==
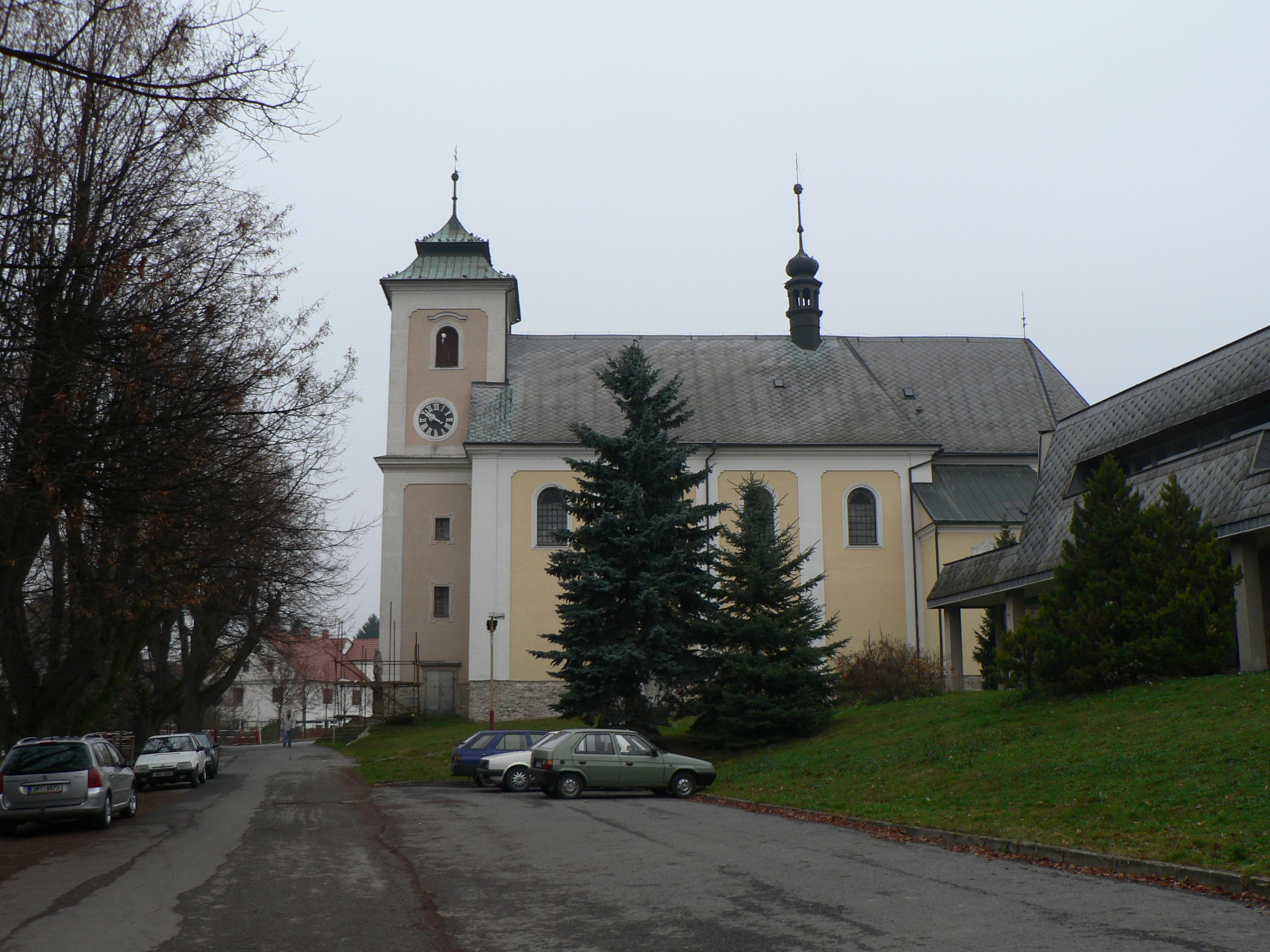
Church of Saint George

The main landmark of Libina is the Church of Saint George. It is a Baroque building with Neoclassical elements, which was probably created by rebuilding an older church.

An architecturally valuable building is Langer's Villa. It is a Neo-Renaissance house, which is an example of Neo-Palladianism. Today it houses the municipal library.

== Notable people ==
- Jaroslav Erik Frič (1949–2019), poet, writer and publisher
