= Russkaya Rech (Saint Petersburg magazine) =

Russian quarterly political and literary magazine

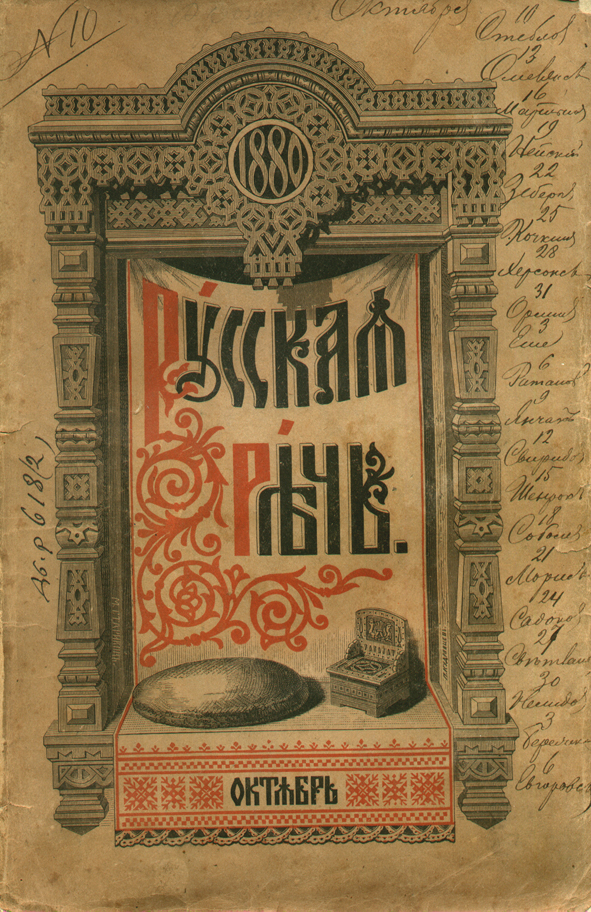
Russkaya Rech, October 1880

Russkaya Rech (Russian: Русская речь, Russian Speech) was a Russian quarterly political and literary magazine published in Saint Petersburg in 1879–1882 by the poet, novelist and playwright Alexander Navrotsky, who was also its editor-in-chief.

Among the authors who contributed to Russkaya Rech regularly, were Alexander Gradovsky, Ivan Goncharov, Nikolai Danilevsky, Alexander Kruglov and Evgeny Markov. The Internal Politics section was run by Mikhail Rosenheim. Navrotsky himself published in it some of his most ambitious works, including the historical dramas Poslednyaya Rus (The Last Rus), Kreshcheniye Litvy (The Conversion of Lithuania) and Iezuity v Litve (Jesuits in Lithuania).

This enterprise proved financial catastrophe for Navrotsky who shut it down in 1882.
