= Sigitas Geda =

Lithuanian poet, translator, playwright, essayist and critic

Sigitas Geda (full name - Sigitas Zigmas Geda; 4 February 1943 – 12 December 2008) was a Lithuanian poet, translator, playwright, essayist, critic and a member of the Lithuanian independence movement, Sąjūdis, and of the Lithuanian parliament, Seimas.

== Biography ==
Sigitas Geda was born in the village of Paterai, in the Lazdijai district of Lithuania during the German occupation of Lithuania, to Zigmas Geda and Aleksandra Gedienė. He was the fourth of seven children.

Geda studied history and philology at Vilnius University. His collection Pėdos (Footprints) was published in 1966. He was also a leading figure in the Movement for the Support of Perestroika or Sąjūdis. For a time Geda withdrew from public life in the independent Lithuania because of his dislike of corruption and infighting.

Geda's poetry has been translated into English by Kerry Shawn Keys.

== Awards ==
- 1994 Lithuanian National Prize
- 1998 Baltic Assembly Prize for Literature, the Arts and Science

== Bibliography ==
=== Bibliography in Lithuanian ===
==== Original works ====
- Pėdos: eilėraščiai. – Vilnius: Vaga, 1966.
- Strazdas: poema. – Vilnius: Vaga, 1967.
- Panteistinė oratorija: libretas. 1970.
- Užmigę žirgeliai: eilėraščiai. – Vilnius: Vaga, 1970.
- 26 rudens ir vasaros giesmės: eilėraščiai. – Vilnius: Vaga, 1972.
- Devil's Bride: screenplay, 1974.
- Mėnulio žiedai: eilėraščiai. – Vilnius: Vaga, 1977.
- Baltojo Nieko dainelės: eilėraščiai. – Vilnius: Vaga, 1977.
- Paskutinės pagonių apeigos: libretas, 1978.
- Marių paukštė: libretas, 1979.
- Mėlynas autobusiukas: eilėraščiai. – Vilnius: Vaga, 1980.
- Dainuojantis ir šokantis mergaitės vieversėlis: 7 pjesių rinkinys. – Vilnius: Vaga, 1981.
- Žydinti slyva Snaigyno ežere: eilėraščiai. – Vilnius: Vaga, 1981.
- Meilė ir mirtis Veronoje ("Life and Death in Verona", rock opera based on Romeo and Juliet): libretto, 1982.
- Varnėnas po mėnuliu: eilėraščiai ir poemos. – Vilnius: Vaga, 1984.
- Vasara su peliuku Miku: eilėraščiai. – Vilnius: Vaga, 1984.
- Strazdas – žalias paukštis: libretas, 1984.
- Mamutų tėvynė: eilėraščiai ir poemos. – Vilnius: Vaga, 1985.
- Baltoji varnelė: eilėraščiai. – Vilnius: Vyturys, 1985.
- Praniukas pramaniūgas: trumpi ir ilgi eilėraščiai. – Vilnius: Vyturys, 1986.
- Kaulo Senis ant geležinio kalno: libretas, 1987.
- Pasaulio medis: libretas, 1987.
- Žalio gintaro vėriniai: eilių romanas. – Vilnius: Vaga, 1988.
- Karalaitė ant svarstyklių: poemos ir eilėraščiai. – Vilnius: Vyturys, 1989.
- Ežys ir Grigo ratai: žodžiai apie kitus. – Vilnius: Vaga, 1989.
- Magiškas sanskrito ratas: libretas, 1989.
- Strazdas – žalias paukštis: scenarijus, 1989.
- Septynių vasarų giesmės: eilėraščiai. – Vilnius: Vaga, 1991.
- Močiutės dainos: eilėraščiai. – Vilnius: Vyturys, 1991.
- Babilono atstatymas: eilėraščiai. – Vilnius: Vaga, 1994.
- Eilėraščiai: eilėraščiai. – Vilnius: Baltos lankos, 1997.
- Valkataujantis katinas: 101 eilėraštis vaikams. – Vilnius: Lietuvos rašytojų sąjungos leidykla, 1997.
- Jotvingių mišios: eilėraščiai. – Vilnius: Andrena, 1997.
- Gedimino valstybės fragmentas: eilėraščiai. – Vilnius: Vyturys, 1997.
- Skrynelė dvasioms pagauti: eilėraščiai. – Vilnius: Vaga, 1998.
- Man gražiausias klebonas – varnėnas: pokalbiai apie poeziją ir apie gyvenimą. – Vilnius: Vyturys, 1998.
- Žydintys lubinai piliakalnių fone: septynių vasarų dienoraščiai. – Vilnius: Seimo leidykla, 1999. Gabrielė Petkevičaitė-Bitė Prize
- Valkataujantis katinas: eilėraščiai. – Vilnius: Lietuvos rašytojų sąjungos leidykla, 1999.
- Baltoji varnelė: eilėraščiai. 2-asis leidimas. – Vilnius: Alma littera, 2000.
- Sokratas kalbasi su vėju: eilėraščiai. – Vilnius: Lietuvos rašytojų sąjungos leidykla, 2001.
- Siužetą siūlau nušauti: esė rinkinys. – Vilnius: Baltos lankos, 2002.
- Žiemos biopsija / Biopsy of winter: eilėraščiai. – Vilnius: Vaga, 2002.
- Po aštuoniolikos metų: atsisveikinimas su Jabaniškėmis: eilėraščiai. – Vilnius: Presvika, 2003.
- Žiemos biopsija: eilėraščiai. – Vilnius: Vaga, 2002.
- Adolėlio kalendoriai: dienoraščiai, gyvavaizdžiai, užrašai, tyrinėjimai. – Vilnius: Lietuvos rašytojų sąjungos leidykla, 2003.
- Strazdelio dainos: vieno gyvenimo rinktinė. – Vilnius: Kronta, 2005.
- Pelytė Sidabrytė: pasaka. – Vilnius: „Baltų lankų“ leidyba, 2004.
- Testamentas mažai mergaitei: kai kas mažiems, kai kas ir…: 75 eilėraščiai. – Vilnius: Trys žvaigždutės, 2006.
- Poezija / Sigitas Geda. – Vilnius, 2006.
- Aukso karietaitė: eilėraščiai vaikams. – Vilnius: Kronta, 2006.
- Miegantis Teodendronas: senieji jotvingių eilėraščiai. – Vilnius: Lietuvos rašytojų sąjungos leidykla, 2006
- Freskos. Eilėraščiai ir poemos. - Vilnius: Lietuvos rašytojų sąjungos leidykla, 2012.

==== Translations ====
- Kornejus Čiukovskis. Painiava: poemėlė. – Vilnius: Vaga, 1972.
- L. Nadis. Poezija. – Vilnius: Vaga, 1972.
- Johanesas Bobrovskis. Sarmatijos metas: eilėraščiai / kartu su B. Savukynu. – Vilnius: Vaga, 1974.
- Dede Gorgudo sakmės / kartu su V. Arzumanovu. – Vilnius: Vaga, 1978.
- Celanas Paulis. Aguona ir atmintis: eilėraščiai / kartu su V. Karalium – Vilnius: Vaga, 1979.
- Sergejus Jeseninas. Ieva: eilėraščiai. – Vilnius: Vaga, 1983.
- Giesmių giesmė. – Vilnius: Vaga, 1983.
- Vahagnas Davtianas. Granatmedžių dienos: eilėraščiai ir poema / kartu su E. Mieželaičiu – Vilnius: Vaga, 1986.
- D. Džalilas. Kurdų sakmės: vyresniam mokykliniam amžiui. – Vilnius: Vyturys, 1987.
- Vaikystės rytmetėliai: latvių vaikų poezija / sudarė Evaldas Juchnevičius. – Vilnius: Vyturys, 1988.
- Lekia mano žirgelis: latvių dainos: viduriniam ir vyresniam mokykliniam amžiui. – Vilnius: Vyturys, 1989.
- Gėlė ir poezija: japonų hokus (haikus), tankos, ikebanos / kartu su R. Neimantu. – Kaunas: Orientas, 1992.
- Psalmių knygos. – Vilnius: Vaga, 1997.
- Panditas Bilhanas. Penkiasdešimt posmų apie slaptąjį meilės džiaugsmą: poema. – Vilnius: Žuvėdra, 1998.
- Dante Alighieri. Naujas gyvenimas: eilėraščiai su proziniais komentarais / kartu su I. Tuliševskaite. – Vilnius: Vyturys, 1998.
- François Villon. Rinktinė poezija. – Vilnius: Lietuvos rašytojų s-gos l-kla, 1999.
- Graikų mūza. – Vilnius: Jandrija, 1999.
- Jaan Kaplinski. Vakaras grąžina viską: poezija. – Vilnius: Andrena, 1999.
- Grigoras Narekaci. Sielvartingų giedojimų knygos. – Vilnius: Vaga, 1999.
- Edgar Lee Masters. Spūn Riverio antologija: epitafijos. – Vilnius: Adrena, 2000.
- Servus, Madonna: mažoji meilės antologija. – Vilnius: UAB „Meralas“, 2000.
- Josif Brodskij. Poezija. – Vilnius: Baltos lankos, 2001.
- Omaras Chajamas. Rubajatai. – Vilnius: Presvika, 2002.
- Arthur Rimbaud. Sezonas pragare; Nušvitimai / kartu su J. Mečkausku-Meškėla – Vilnius: Andrena: Dictum, 2003.
- Charles Baudelaire. Piktybės gėlės: poezija. – Vilnius: Lietuvos rašytojų sąjungos leidykla, 2005.
- A. A. Milne. Kai mes buvome maži: eilėraščiai vaikams. – Vilnius: Garnelis, 2005.
- Dante Alighieri. Dieviškoji komedija. Pragaras: poezija. – Vilnius: Lietuvos rašytojų sąjungos leidykla, 2007.
- Koranas: Literatūrinių prasmių vertimas. – Vilnius, Kronta, 2008.
- William Shakespeare. Sonetai – Vilnius, Žara, 2009.
- Tarielis Čanturija. Iš gruzinų poezijos. Poezijos pavasaris 1978. - Vilnius: Vaga, 1978

=== Bibliography in English ===
- Selected Poems of Sigitas Geda, Biopsy of Winter, translation from Lithuanian, Vaga Press, 2002
- Preface to Thirteen Poems by Sigitas Geda by Jonas Zdanys
