= Boris Ostanin =

Russian translator and literary critic (1946–2023)

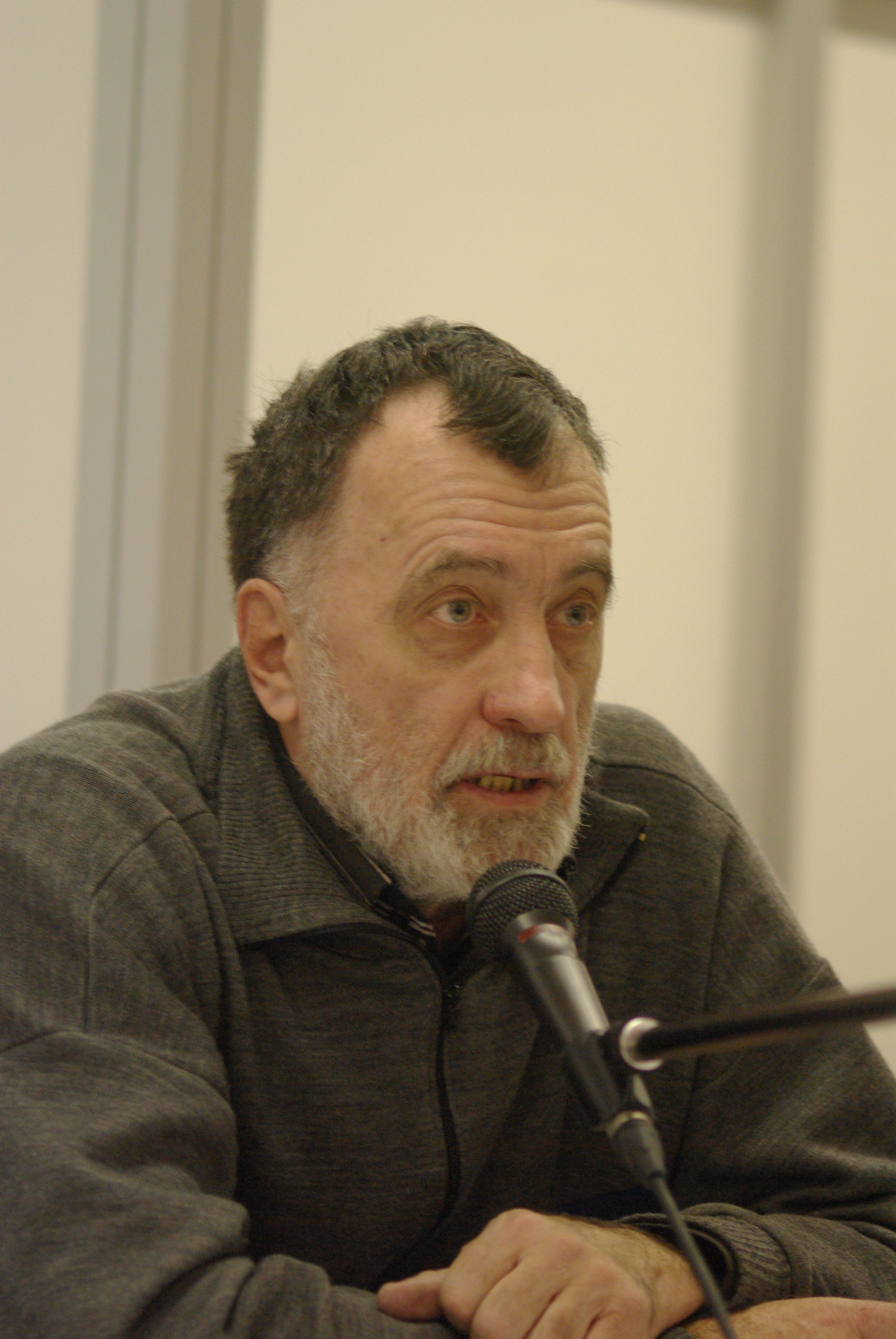
- Ostanin in 2010
- Born: Boris Vladimirovich Ostanin; 1 October 1946; Bada, Chita Oblast, Russian SFSR, USSR
- Died: 22 September 2023 (aged 76); Saint Petersburg, Russia
- Education: Leningrad State University
- Occupations: Translator; Literary critic

Boris Vladimirovich Ostanin (Russian: Борис Владимирович Останин; 1 October 1946 – 22 September 2023) was a Russian translator, literary critic, writer, and essayist.

== Biography ==
Born in Bada on 1 October 1946, Ostanin grew up in a military family and spent his childhood following his father's assignments within the Soviet Union. In 1961, he settled in Leningrad. After graduating from the Faculty of Mathematics and Mechanics at Leningrad State University, he held smaller jobs such as a lift operator and a security guard.

Ostanin was co-editor of the Samizdat Tchassy alongside Boris Ivanov, with whom he founded the paper in 1976. He was one of the co-founders of the Andrei Bely Prize, which became an event for dissident writers and remains a prominent Russian award today.

Boris Ostanin died in Saint Petersburg on 22 September 2023 at the age of 76.
