= Sergey Zavyalov =

Russian poet (born 1958)

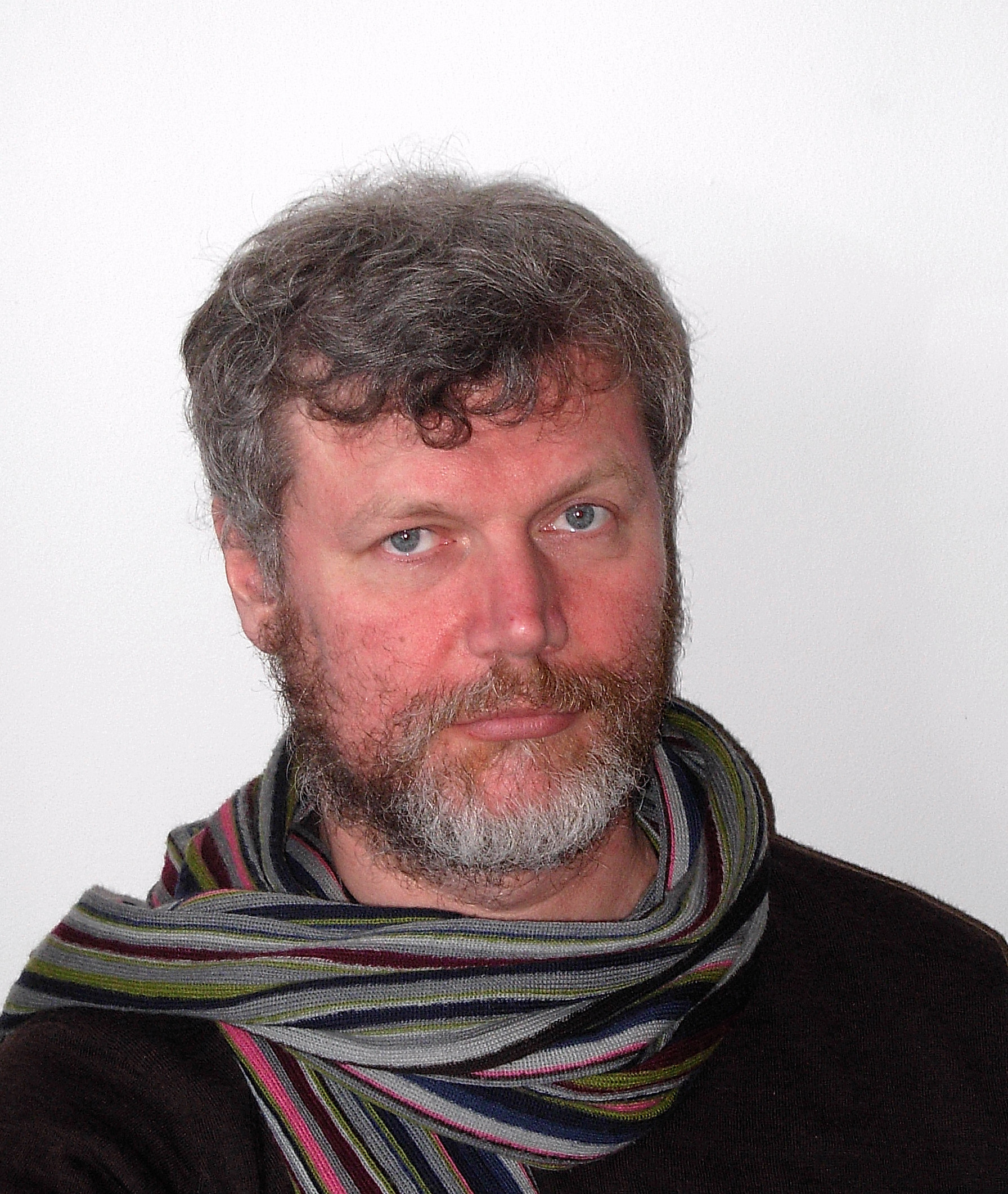
- Born: Sergey Alexandrovich Zavyalov; 18 May 1958; Tsarskoye Selo, Soviet Union
- Occupation: Poet
- Writing career
- Language: Russian (poetry)
- Notable awards: Andrei Bely Prize (2015); Premio Ceppo Internazionale Piero Bigongiari (Italy), (2016)

Sergey Alexandrovich Zavyalov (Russian: Сергей Александрович Завьялов; born 18 May 1958) is a Russian poet.

== Biography ==
Sergey Zavyalov was born into a family that originated from Mordovia, from 1970 to 2004 he lived in St. Petersburg. In 1985 he graduated in classical philology, Leningrad State University. Between 1988 and 2004 Zavyalov taught Greek, Latin and classical literature at high school and university level. In 2004 he emigrated to Finland; and has lived in Winterthur (Switzerland) since 2011.

== Literary activity ==
Zavyalov’s first published poems appeared in Leningrad Samizdat. In 1986-1988 he was a member of the creative group Club-81 (a kind of Leningrad union of writers, an alternative to the union of Soviet writers). In the second half of the 1990s, Zavyalov participated in several joint literary actions with a group of St. Petersburg poets, later on to be known as postmodernists (Arkadii Dragomoshchenko, Alexander Skidan, Dmitry Golynko and others). Within the thirty years of literary activity, Zavyalov’s poetry has gradually developed from vers libre to prose poetry and from the lyrical to the epic. In the 2000s he published a number of essays analysing Soviet poetry as evidence of traumatic experience. His second special topic is postcolonial studies in the reconstruction and deconstruction of Erzya and Moksha and, more generally, Finno-Ugric identity.

== Selected bibliography ==
Verse collections

- Ody i epody (‘Odes and Epodes’). St.Petersburg: Borey-Art, 1994. — ISBN 5-7187-0118-0
- Melica. The second book of verse. Moscow: Argo-Risk, 1998. — ISBN 5-900506-78-9
- Melica. [Books one and two 1984-2003]. Moscow: Novoye Literaturnoye Obozreniye / New Literary Observer, 2003. — ISBN 5-86793-267-2
- Rechi (‘Orations’). Moscow: Novoye Literaturnoye Obozreniye / New Literary Observer, 2010. — ISBN 978-5-86793-807-9
- Soviet Cantatas. St.Petersburg: Translit / Free Marxist Publishing, 2015.
- Stihotvoreniya i poemy 1993–2017 (Collected Poems 1993-2017). Moscow: Novoye Literaturnoye Obozreniye / New Literary Observer, 2018. - ISBN 978-5-4448-0733-0

Essays

- “Перипетия и трагическая ирония в советской поэзии” (Peripeteia and Tragic Irony in Soviet Poetry), Новое литературное обозрение / New Literary Observer 59 (2003): 244-249.
- “Концепт «современности» и категория времени в «советской» и «несоветской» поэзии” (The Concept of ‘Contemporariness’ and the Category of Time in ‘Soviet’ and ‘Non-Soviet’ Poetry), Новое литературное обозрение / New Literary Observer 62 (2003): 22-33.
- “Поэзия Айги: разговор с русским читателем” (Aygi’s Poetry: Conversing with Russian Readers), Новое литературное обозрение / New Literary Observer 79 (2006): 205-212.
- “Сквозь мох беззвучия: поэзия восточнофинского этнофутуризма” (Through the Moss of Memory Loss: The Poetry of Eastern Finnic Ethnofuturism), Новое литературное обозрение / New Literary Observer 85 (2007): 339-353.
- “«Поэзия – всегда не то, всегда – другое»: переводы модернистской поэзии в СССР в 1950 – 1980-е годы” (“Poetry is always something else, it’s always otherwise”: Translating Modernist Poetry in the USSR in the 1950s—1980s), Новое литературное обозрение / New Literary Observer 92 (2008): 104-119.
- “Советский поэт (А. Т. Твардовский)” (The Soviet Poet (A. T. Tvardovsky)), Литературная матрица: Учебник, написанный писателями (Literary Matrix: A Textbook Written by Writers), vol. 2: 683-722. St. Petersburg: Limbus Press, 2010.
- “Разговор о свободном стихе как приглашение к классовому анализу” (A Colloquy on Vers libre as an Invitation to Class Analysis), Новое литературное обозрение / New Literary Observer 114 (2012): 274-279.
- “Что остается от свидетельства: меморизация травмы в творчестве Ольги Берггольц” (What Remains of Witness: The ‘Memorization’ of Trauma in the Work of Olga Bergholz), Новое литературное обозрение / New Literary Observer 116 (2012): 146-157.
- “Ретромодернизм в ленинградской поэзии 1970-х годов” (Retromodernism in Leningrad Poetry of the 1970s), Вторая культура: Неофициальная поэзия Ленинграда в 1970-1980-е годы (The Second Culture: Non-official Leningrad Poetry of the 1970s-1980s), 30-52. St. Petersburg: Rostok, 2013.

== Translations into English and other languages ==
English:

- Sergey Zavyalov. Advent, Leningrad, 1941. Geneva: Molecular Press, 2017 - ISBN 978-2-9700376-4-4
- Crossing Centuries: The New Generation in Russian Poetry (Transl. by Laura D. Weeks). Jersey City, NJ: Talisman, 2000 – p. 474-477.
- A Public Space (NY) # 02 (summer 2006) (Transl. by Rebecca Bella) p. 169-172. Schemata rhetorica.
- St. Petersburg Review (NY) # 2, 2008 (Transl. by Rebecca Bella) p. 102-105. Oedipus at Colonus.
- Aufgabe (NY) # 8, 2009 p. 114-124.

Est modus in rebus. (Transl. by Thomas Epstein), Through The Teeth. I. The final judgement of mr. Terreo, II. Time of destruction. (Transl. by Simona Schneider)

Collections of Zavyalov’s poems in Finnish, Swedish, Estonian and Italian:

- Sergej Zavjalov. Melika. Suomentanut Jukka Mallinen. Helsinki: Ntamo, 2007. 207 s.
- Sergei Zavjalov. Joulupaasto. Suomentanut Jukka Mallinen. Helsinki: Poesia, 2012. 109 s.
- Sergej Zavjalov. Melik och tal. Texter i urval och översättning av Mikael Nydahl. [Malmö]: Ariel skrifter, 2009. 128 s.
- Sergei Zavjalov. Meelika. Kõned. Vene keelest tõlkinud Katrin Väli ja Aare Pilv. Tallinn: Kite, 2015. 144 s.
- Sergei Zavjalov. Ars Poetica. Valik esseid. Vene keelest tõlkinud Aare Pilv. Tallinn: Tallinna Ülikooli Kirjastus, 2016, 269 lk. ISBN 978-9985-58-815-4
- Sergej Zav'jalov. Il digiuno natalizio. A cura di Paolo Galvagni. [Roma]: Fermenti editrice, 2016. pp. 148. ISBN 978-88-97171-72-0

== Poems published in anthologies, journals and almanacs ==
- French (Sergueï Zavialov)
- Italian (Sergej Zav’jalov)
- German (Sergej Sawjalow)
- Chinese (谢尔盖 扎维亚洛夫)
- Serbian (Сергеj Завjалов)
- Lithuanian (Sergejus Zavjalovas)
- Polish (Siergiej Zawjałow)
- Hungarian (Szergej Zavjalov)
- Latvian (Sergejs Zavjalovs)
- Erzya (Сергей Завьялов)
