= Mikhail Rosenheim =

Russian poet, publicist and translator

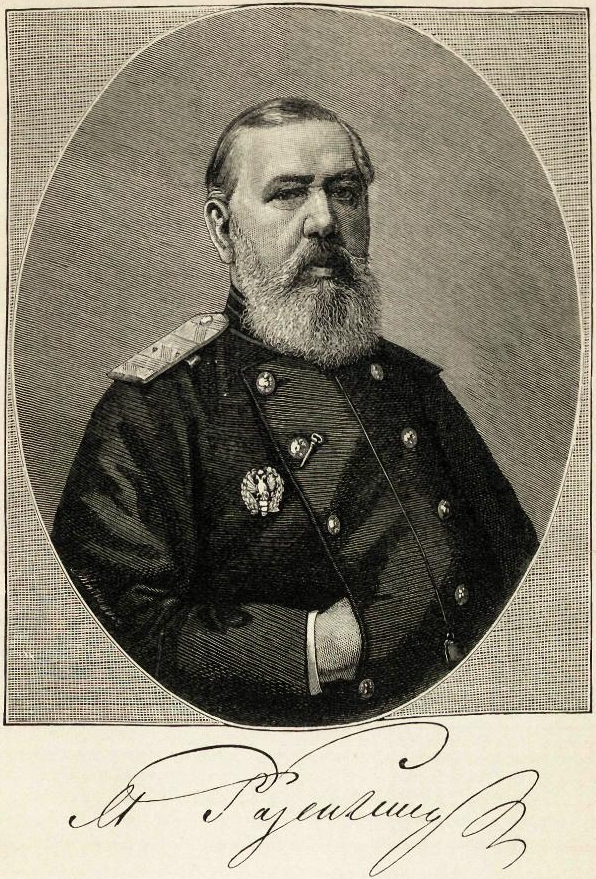
- Born: Михаил Павлович Розенгейм; July 31, 1820; Saint Petersburg, Russian Empire
- Died: March 19, 1887 (aged 66); Saint Petersburg, Russian Empire
- Occupations: poet, editor, essyaist, translator

Mikhail Pavlovich Rosenheim (Михаил Павлович Розенгейм, 31 July 1820, Saint Petersburg, Russian Empire, – 19 March 1887, Saint Petersburg) was a Russian poet, editor (Zanoza, 1863-1865), publicist and translator.

Rosenheim started writing poetry in the late 1830s, but thought little of it and debuted only in the mid-1850 (Otechestvennye Zapiski, Russky Vestnik). in 1858 Rosehheim's first poetry collection came out and made him a well-known author. Initially a typical exponent of the Nekrasov-founded 'vice-flogging' trend in the Russian poetry, he was rather unpopular with the literary left, notably Nikolai Dobrolyubov, who mocked Rosenheim's 'safe' radicalism in his reviews and parodies.

In 1863 Mikhail Rosenheim started editing the satirical journal Zanoza (Splinter) which quickly became popular and reached a circulation of 5 thousand in 1865 when it was closed by the Russian authorities. In his later years Rosenheim lost interest in poetry and switched to sociology and politics, publishing essays, mainly in Golos newspaper and Russkaya Retch magazine, where he was the head of the Internal politics section.

Rosenheim, a First Cadet School graduate who studied at the Alexander Military Law Academy (1866-1869), enjoyed a successful parallel career as a military lawyer and later in life was promoted to the rank of Major General. After the publication of his History of Russian Military Law in 1878, he received a diamond ring from Alexander II, as a personal gift.
