= Vladimir Zavyalov =

Vladimir Zavyalov may refer to:

- Vladimir Andreyevich Zavyalov (b. 1989), Russian footballer
- Vladimir Zavyalov (ice hockey), Kazakhstani ice hockey player who participated in the 1998 Olympics
