= Elena Fanailova =

Russian poet (born 1962)

- Елена Фанайлова
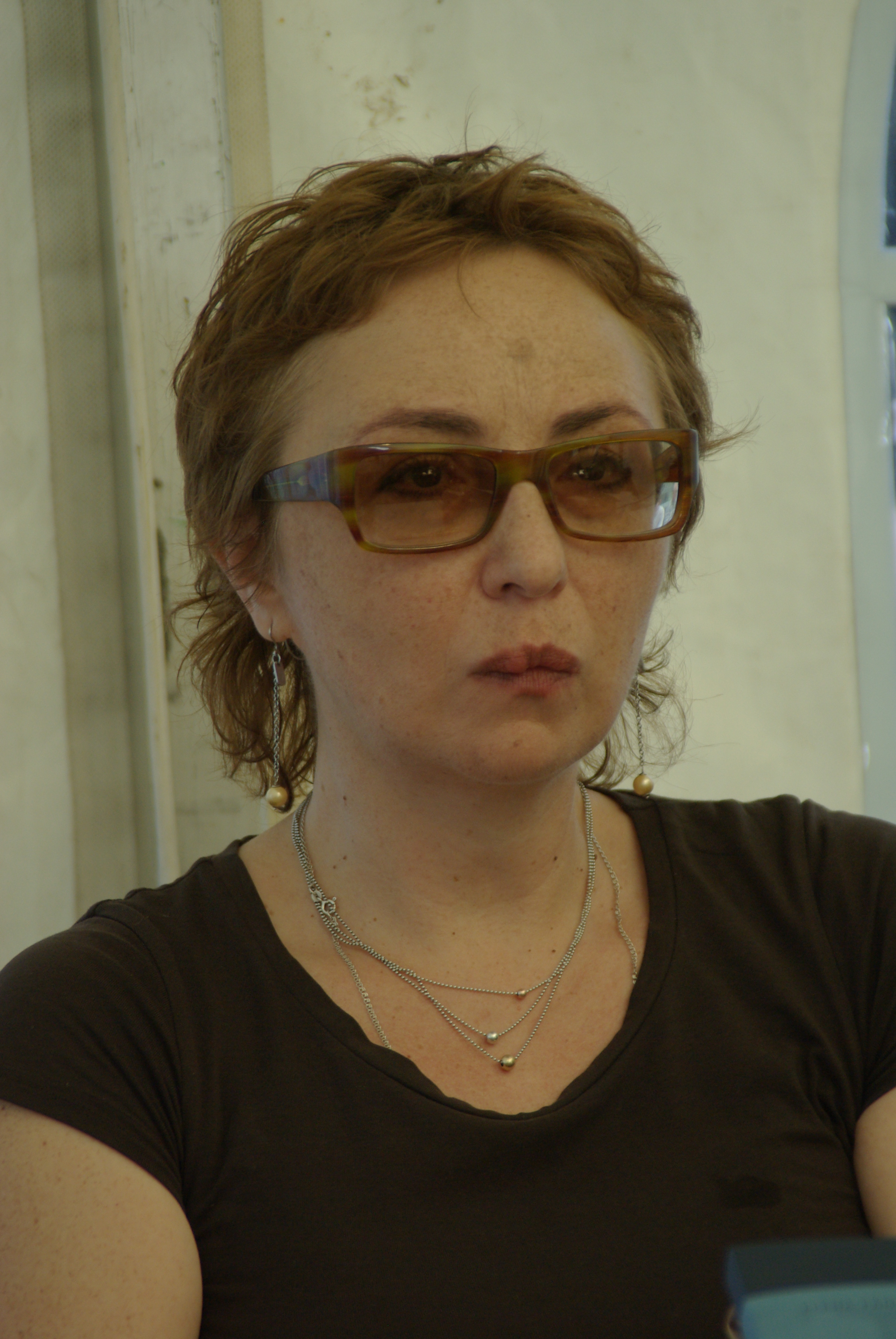
- Fanailova in 2010
- Born: 19 December 1962 (age 63); Voronezh, Soviet Union
- Education: Voronezh Medical Institute; Voronezh State University
- Occupation: Poet
- Awards: Moscow Rating

Elena Nikolayevna Fanailova (Russian: Еле́на Никола́евна Фана́йлова, IPA: [jɪˈlʲɛnə nʲɪkɐˈlajɪvnə fɐˈnajləvə]; born 19 December 1962) is a Russian poet.

== Biography ==
Born in Voronezh, she graduated from the Voronezh Medical Institute and earned a degree in journalism from Voronezh State University. She worked for six years as a doctor at Voronezh Regional Hospital. In 1995 she became a correspondent for Radio Svoboda, and has lived and worked in Moscow since the late nineties. She has contributed verse and literary reviews to Znamya, the New Literary Review, Critical Mass, Mitin Journal, and other publications. She has also translated the verses of Serhiy Zhadan from Ukrainian. She received the Andrei Bely Prize in 1999 and the Moscow Count Prize in 2003.

Her poetry is characterized by its harsh outlook and precise language. During the early 2000s it came to be representative of the new Russian literary preoccupation with the theme of citizenship and the problems of personal historical memory and historical self-image.

== Works ==
- The Journey (Путешествие), 1994.
- Extremely Cynical (С особым цинизмом), 2000.
- Transylvania is Disturbing (Трансильвания беспокоит), 2002.
- Russian Version (Русская версия), 2005. (Book and CD)
- Black Suits (Чёрные костюмы), 2008.
