= Alexander Navrotsky =

Russian writer, poet and playwright

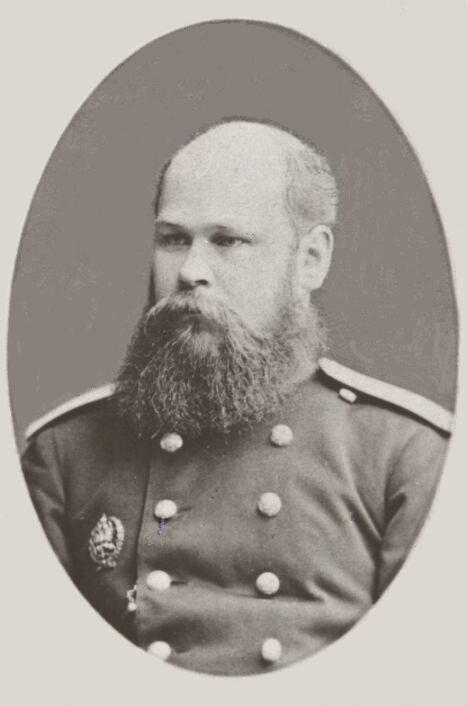
- Born: 13 March 1839; Saint Petersburg, Russian Empire
- Died: 27 September 1878 (aged 39); Saint Petersburg, Russian Empire
- Occupations: poet, novelist, playwright, editor

Alexander Alexandrrovich Navrotsky (Russian: Александр Александрович Навроцкий; 13 March 1839 – 10 June 1914) was a Russian writer, poet and playwright, known also under his pen name N. A. Vrotsky. His best-known poem, "The Stenka Razin Cliff" (Утёс Стеньки Разина), set to music by himself, became popular among Russian revolutionaries in the late 19th-early 20th century and is now considered part of Russian musical folklore.

== Biography ==
Navrotsky was born in Saint Petersburg to a noble Russian family based in Moscow Governorate. After graduating from the Second St. Petersburg Cadet Corps, he joined the Moscow Guard Regiment, but was forced to retire in 1867 due to serious head injury he received in Poland in 1863 while taking part in the suppression of the January Uprising. After graduating the Military Law Academy in Petersburg, he went on to serve as a deputy military procurator of Moscow, then returned to Saint Petersburg to start a career of a successful military lawyer.

In 1869 Navrotsky debuted as novelist with Semeistvo Tarskikh (Семейство Тарских, The Tarsky Family). It was dismissed by the contemporary critics as 'empty and preposterous', but made him known in the literary circles. Navrotsky started to contribute regularly to the liberal Vestnik Evropy. He joined the Military History Society, then started to attend the literary salons of Anna Filosofova and Sofya Tolstaya, became friends with Nikolai Leskov and Fyodor Dostoyevsky, visited Leo Tolstoy at his Yasnaya Polyana estate.

External videos
- The Stenka Razin Cliff (Есть на Волге Утёс), performed by Pyatnitsky Choir (YouTube)

In 1879 Navrotsky launched his own magazine Russkaya Retch where he published some of his major work, including the historical dramas in verse The Last Rus, as well as The Conversion of Lithuania and Jesuits in Lithuania. A conservative Slavophile, Navrotsky's agenda as a publicist included the critique of nihilism, materialism, 'western Socialism', all kinds of radicalism, but also bureaucratic inefficiency, so as to highlight the role of the Tsar as a zealous reformer, eager to get as close as possible to his own people.

Navrotsky's numerous poems were collected in several the books, including Pictures of the Past (Картины минувшего, 1881), Russian Land's Guiding Lights (Светочи Русской земли, 1896), Tales of the Past. Russian Bylinas and Legends in Verse (books 1–3, 1896), Down the Volga River. The Volga Bylinas and Legends in Verse (1903). Among them was "The Stenka Razin Cliff" (Утёс Стеньки Разина), written in 1864 and first published in 1870. The poem which Navrotsky himself set to music (and published the score of in 1896) became hugely popular among Russian revolutionaries of the time, to become (according to Ieronim Yasinsky) the "Russian answer to La Marseillaise". Equally powerful impact had the dramatized chronicles Stenka Razin (1871, dedicated to Mykola Kostomarov whose 1858 book The Uprising of Stenka Razin provided the source of inspiration) which a group of the tchaykovtsy published in Geneva in 1873 without the author's permission (and including the by now famous "Cliff", to serve as a life-affirming finale).

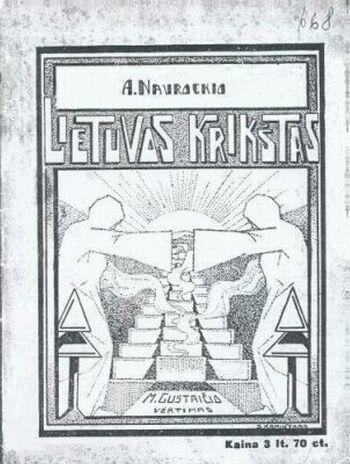
A. A. Navrockij. Lietuvos Krikstas. Eiletine penkiu veiksmu drama / The Conversion of Lithuania. 1927

In the early 1870s Navrotsky took up the post of a military procurator of Vilno. While there, he developed a keen interest in the Lithuanian history and culture which resulted in two epic drama and numerous poems. The Conversion of Lithuania (Крещение Литвы), written in 1874 and first published in 1879 in Russkaya Retch, featured in Volume 3 of the Works by A. Navrotsky (1900), but continued to be edited by the author and only in 1902 came out in its final version. By this time Navrotsky has written music for some of its episodes and the finale. The drama was translated into Lithuanian by the Catholic priest and poet Motiejus Gustaitis. With the translator's notes and the music score, it was published in 1927 in Kaunas. Another drama in verse, Jesuits in Lithuania (Иезуиты в Литве, 1876), dealt with the strengthening of the Jesuits' power in the country during the reign of Stephen Báthory.

In 1891, ranked Lieutenant general, Navrotsky retired. This decade saw the publication of the short stories collection Waves of Life (Волны жизни, 1894) as well as two novels, Under the Blows of Fate (Под ударами судьбы, 1898) and To Each Their Own (Каждому своё, 1899). Navrotsky's most cherished genre was that of a historical drama in verse, his attitude remaining unwaveringly pro-monarchist. In 1903 he joined the right-wing Russian Assembly to become one of its most active members. Of Navrotsky's later work the most successful was the tragedy in verse The Tsar Ioann III Vasilyevich which received a special diploma at the Pushkin Prize Award ceremony in 1901. It was followed by Darya Osokina, the Merchant's Daughter (1904), The Siege of Rostov (1906), Turbulent Times (Лихолетье, 1910), Artemy Petrovich Volynsky (1910). He continued to publish poems and essays, mainly in Russky Vestnik (1903—1904), Mirny Trud (1905, 1907) and Svetoch (1910).

Alexander Navrotsky died in Saint Petersburg and is interred in the Novodevichye Cemetery.
