= Alexander Zavyalov (ice hockey) =

Russian ice hockey player

- Born: October 28, 1969 (age 55); Krasnoyarsk, Russian SFSR, Soviet Union
- Height: 5 ft 11 in (180 cm)
- Weight: 192 lb (87 kg; 13 st 10 lb)
- Position: Defence
- Played for: Sokol Novocheboksarsk; SKA Sverdlovsk; Itil Kazan; Ak Bars Kazan; SKA Saint Petersburg; Torpedo Nizhny Novgorod; HC Yugra; MHC Dmitrov; Ariada Volzhsk
- Playing career: 1987–2011

Alexander Zavyalov (born October 28, 1969) is a Russian and Soviet former professional ice hockey defenceman. He is a one-time Russian Champion.

== Awards and honors ==
| Award | Year |
|---|---|
Russian Superleague
| Champion (Ak Bars Kazan) | 1998 |
