= Sergei Kruglov (poet) =

Russian poet and priest

Sergei Gennadiyevich Kruglov (Russian: Серге́й Генна́дьевич Кругло́в, born July 26, 1966) is a Russian poet and priest.

Born in Krasnoyarsk, he studied journalism at Siberian Federal University but did not graduate. He worked at the urban newspaper Vlast' Trudu (Russian: Власть труду; Power to Labor) and has published poems since 1993. In 1996 he was baptized in the Russian Orthodox Church and was ordained as a priest three years later. He serves at Spassky Cathedral in Minusinsk. In 2002 a selection of his poems, previously anthologized in the 2001 collection Provincial Literature, were shortlisted for the Andrei Bely Prize. In 2008 he received the Prize for his books The Mirror (Зеркальце, 2007) and The Typist (Переписчик, 2008).

== Published books ==
- The Deposition of the Serpent (Снятие Змия со креста, 2003)
- The Mirror (Зеркальце, 2007)
- The Offering (Приношение, 2008)
- The Typist (Переписчик, 2008)

== Criticism ==
- (in Russian) Galina Ermoshina, Power to the Dark, a review at Russian Journal, 13 November 2002.
- (in Russian) Dmitry Kuzmin, Underground Fire, a review of Deposition of the Serpent in the New Literary Review, 2003.
- (in Russian) Elena Fanailova, Deposition of the Serpent, a review in The Critical Mass, issue 2, 2004.
- (in Russian) Boris Dubin, By Cellulose and Saliva, an analysis of Kruglov's style in the New Literary Review, 2007.
