= Literatura na Świecie =

Polish literary magazine

Literatura na Świecie (World Literature) was, during the times of the Polish People's Republic, one of the most widely read and sought after periodicals in Poland. The magazine was started in 1971. Its headquarters is in Warsaw. In the 1970s the periodical acquired the style it retains to this day, a style that involves producing monographic issues.

The editors have some true bestsellers to their credit, including the so-called "erotica" issue of Literatura na Świecie which included texts by Henry Miller. Other achievements include the publication of a series of outstanding translations of contemporary American poetry (issue no. 7 in 1986, referred to as the "American" issue), which radically changed the poetry written by younger generation Polish poets.

Literatura na Świecie, as edited by Piotr Sommer, is a modern and highly competent periodical that not only publishes translations of literary texts, but has also expanded its profile to include ever more frequent forays into the presentation of the texts of contemporary philosophers. It is published on a monthly basis.

The magazine presents the award of the year's best translations.

== See also ==
- List of literary magazines
