= Jaroslav Erik Frič =

Czech poet and musician (1949–2019)

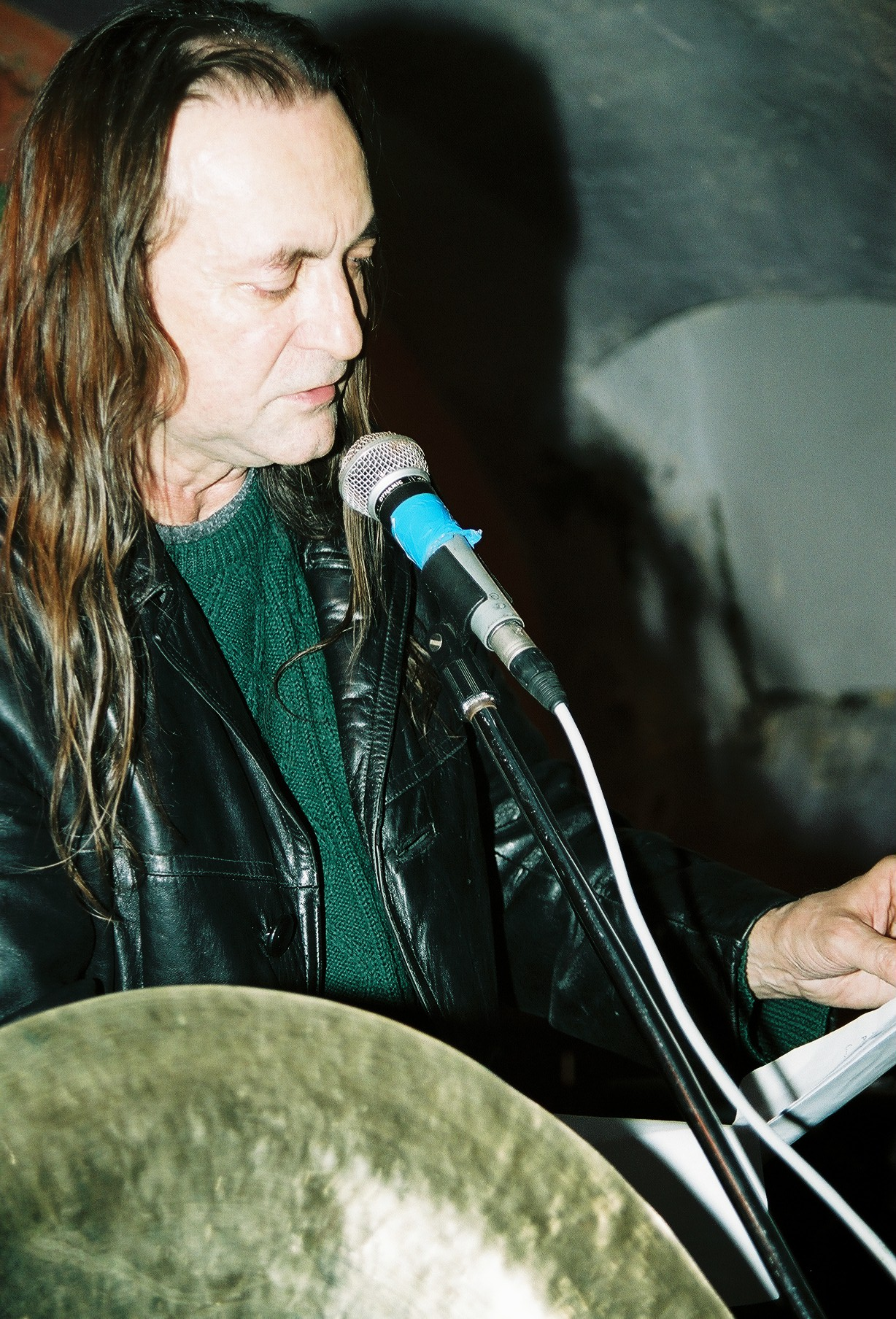
Jaroslav Erik Frič, club performance

Jaroslav Erik Frič (14 August 1949, Libina – 24 May 2019, Brno) was a Czech poet, musician, publisher and organizer of underground culture festivals.

== Life and career ==
Born in Libina by Šumperk, he studied the primary and secondary schools in Ostrava; there he also spent a year learning English, Russian, French and Italian at a language school. In 1968, he travelled through the Western Europe immediately after the exams, spending most of the time in England and Scotland. During this time, he earned money for example as a busker. He returned to occupied Czechoslovakia and studied English and philosophy, at first in Olomouc (Palacký University), then in Brno (Masaryk University). He graduated in 1974. Not willing to collaborate with the communist regime in any way, he worked as a waiter until the 1989 revolution.

In 1969, Frič started to publish in samizdat, together with fellow poets Petr Mikeš and Eduard Zacha, in Ostrava and then in Olomouc. His edition, after a theologist and another poet Rostislav Valušek joined them, turned into a line of books called Texty přátel ("Texts by Friends"). In 1973 Frič, together with Jiří Frišauf and Jiří Kuběna, founded an "apartment scene" Šlépěj v okně and then, in Brno, and later also in Vranov nad Dyjí and Podhradí, published samizdat for his closest friends; mainly the works of Josef Šafařík, Jiří Kuběna and also literature almanacs, usually in 5–10 copies.

In 1991 he founded a publishing house Votobia which, after several other people joined in, moved from Vranov to Olomouc. However, he left Votobia after two years and founded a publishing house named Vetus Via in Brno. Since 2000 he organised a Brno festival of poetry Potulný dělník (The Wandering Worker). He also founded two non-governmental organizations: Proximus (2002; "to support people who belong to minorities, mainly racial, ethnical and religious ones, and to support people handicapped socially or by health") which is connected to the depths of Czech traditions and culture and which organises many festivals and other projects (such as Uši a vítr (Ears and Wind) which take place every Thursday and introduce poets and musicians; and Christiania (2006; "for support of culture, national memory and minorities"). He worked as a chief editor of BOX ("biannual revue for word-picture-sound-movement-life") and Uši a vítr (a monthly newspaper of Potulná Akademie ("The Wandering Academy")). He also wrote for Czech Radio which broadcast three screenplays written by him. Since 2006 he started to perform as a busker again and then he started to write a daily blog. Jaroslav Erik Frič lived mainly in Brno.

He died in his sleep in Brno.

== Works ==
=== Books ===
- Kolotoče bílé hlasy (básně z let 1986-1992), Vetus Via, Brno 1993, poetry
- Houpací kůň šera a jiné básně (1993–1995), Vetus Via, Brno 1998, poetry
- Americká antologie & Poslední autobus noční linky (1989 a 2003), bibliofilská edice Siluety, Zdeněk Janál, Prostějov 2004, poetry published as bibliophilia

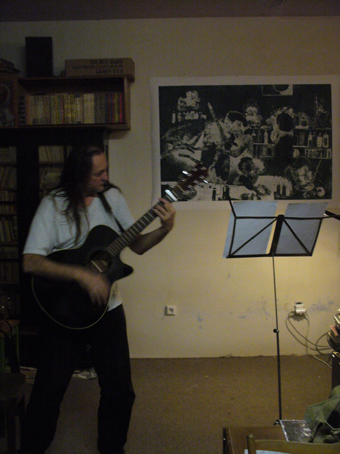
Jaroslav Erik Frič performing

=== CDs ===
- Jsi orkneyské víno (A poem from 1996–2000, music by Brno rock group Čvachtavý lachtan), Guerilla Records & Vetus Via, 2003
- S kým skončila noc (A poem from 2001–2002, music by part of Čvachtavý lachtan and the violoncellist Josef Klíč)
- Poslední autobus noční linky (A poem from 2003, music by Josef Klíč), both published by Guerilla Records, 2006

=== Radio screenplays ===
- Léon Bloy: Poutník Absolutna, 2003
- Ivan M. Jirous: "Básník může být rád, že ho jeho bližní nezabijou", 2004
- Josef Šafařík: Cestou k poslednímu - i prvnímu, 2005
