= Richard Caddel =

Richard Caddel (13 July 1949 – 1 April 2003) was a poet, publisher and editor who was a key figure in the British Poetry Revival.

== Biography ==
Caddel was born in Bedford and grew up in Gillingham, Kent. He studied music at the University of Newcastle, but changed to English after meeting poets Basil Bunting and Tom Pickard. He helped Tom and Connie Pickard organise the seminal Morden Tower poetry readings.

Caddel's work was influenced by Bunting, by the Americans Lorine Niedecker, Louis Zukofsky, Robert Creeley and William Carlos Williams, and by the English landscape tradition as represented by John Clare.

He published a number of small pamphlets, most of which were collected in three books: Sweet Cicely (1983), Uncertain Time (1990) and Larksong Signal (1997). A volume of selected poems, Magpie Words, appeared in 2002. His final book, Writing In The Dark, was published in late 2003.

With his wife Ann Caddel, he ran Pig Press, through which he published a number of British, Irish and American poets of the latter half of the 20th century.

Caddel edited Bunting's Uncollected Poems in 1991 and his Complete Poems in 1994. With Peter Quartermain, he edited the anthology Other: British And Irish Poetry Since 1970 (1998). He served as Director of the Basil Bunting Poetry Centre at Durham University for a number of years up to his death.

A lifelong asthmatic, Caddel died of leukaemia on 1 April 2003.

== Works ==
=== Poetry ===
- Heron, Makaris, 1973.
- Quiet Alchemy, Ceolfrith Press, 1976.
- Burnt Aces and the Shangri-Las, Ceolfrith Press, 1978.
- Baby Days and Moon Diaries, Galloping Dog Press, 1979.
- Shelter, Oasis Books, 1979.
- A Short Climate-Atlas of the Soul, Figs, 1982.
- Sweet Cicely: New and Selected Poems, Taxus Press, 1983
- Enchanter's Nightshade- homage to Louis Zukofsky, Gate Press, 1986.
- Summer Poems, Taxus Press, 1986.
- Fantasia in the English Choral Tradition, Slug Press, 1986.
- Against Numerology, North and South, 1988.
- Uncertain Time, Galloping Dog Press, 1990.
- Larksong Signal, Shearsman Press, 1997.
- Underwriter, Maquette Press, 1998.
- For the Fallen, Wild Honey Press, 2000.
- Monksnailsongs, with Tony Baker, Wild Honey Press, 2002.
- Magpie Words: Selected Poems 1970-2000, West House Books, 2002.
- Writing in the Dark, West House Books, 2003.

=== Prose ===
- The Wire Book, X Press, 1977.
- Wine Tales, with Lee Harwood, Galloping Dog Press, 1984.
- Deadly Sins, Taxus Press, 1984.

=== Editor ===
- Blocks from the Collection of Roger Tomlin, Arc Press, 1979.
- Pete Laver: Offcomers, Pig Press, 1985.
- Basil Bunting: A Note on Briggflatts, Basil Bunting Poetry Archive, 1989.
- Twenty-Six New British Poets, New American Writing, 1991.
- Basil Bunting: Uncollected Poems, Oxford University Press, 1991.
- The Complete Poems: Basil Bunting, Oxford University Press (Oxford, England), 1994.
- Other: British and Irish Poetry Since 1970, with Peter Quartermain, University Press of New England (Hanover, NH), 1999.
