= Alexander Kruglov =

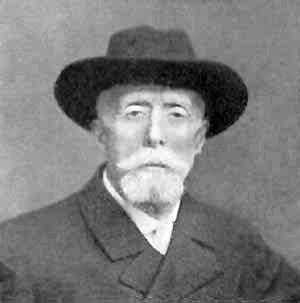
- Born: Alexander Vasilyevich Kruglov; Александр Васильевич Круглов; 17 June 1852; Veliky Ustyug, Vologda Governorate, Russian Empire
- Died: 22 October 1915 (aged 63); Sergiyev Posad, Moscow Governorate, Russian Empire
- Occupation: writer • poet • critic • editor

Alexander Vasilyevich Kruglov (Russian: Александр Васильевич Круглов, 17 June 1852 – 22 October 1915) was a writer from the Russian Empire. His specific works made him a poet, publicist, biographer and editor.

Born in Veliky Ustyug, he spent his childhood in Vologda and in 1873, having graduated from the Teachers' College there, moved to Saint Petersburg where he started to publish stories and poetry, to become in several years' time one of Russia's most popular children's authors. Among Kruglov's best-known books addressed to the young readership, were the collections of short stories, Follow Me, Children (1888), For the Little Ones (1898), Forget-Me-Nots (1900), as well as the novellas Ivan Ivanovich and His Company (1882), Bolshak (1883), From the Golden Years of Childhood (1889). His acclaimed biography of Mikhail Lomonosov, written while still in Vologda, at age 18, was later released as a book and enjoyed eight re-issues.

Kruglov's more serious works (Living Souls, 1885; On the Historical River, 1890 and others) were influenced by Fyodor Dostoyevsky, whom he considered to be his teacher. He is credited with being the first Russian author who wrote about the Komi peoples and the great hardships they were suffering at the time. Initially a narodnik, later in his life Kruglov became a conservative. In 1907—1914 he published and edited the magazine Dnevnik Pisatelya (Writer's Diary), a pro-monarchist publication.
