= Arkadii Dragomoshchenko =

Russian writer (1946–2012)

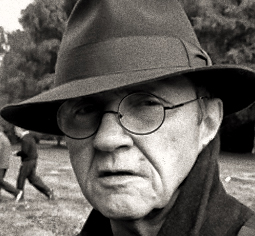

Arkadii Trofimovich Dragomoshchenko (Russian: Арка́дий Трофи́мович Драгомо́щенко, IPA: [ɐrˈkadʲɪj trɐˈfʲiməvʲɪdʑ drəɡɐˈmoɕːɪnkə]; 1946 – 12 September 2012) was a Russian poet, writer, translator, and lecturer. He is considered the foremost representative of language poetry in contemporary Russian literature.

== Biography ==
Arkadii Trofimovich Dragomoshchenko, son of a Soviet military officer, was born on 3 February 1946 in Potsdam, in the Soviet Occupation Zone of Germany, and raised in Vinnytsia, Ukrainian SSR. From 1969 Dragomoshchenko lived in Saint Petersburg. He received the Andrey Bely Independent Literary prize in 1978, the Electronic Text Award ("for poetry from Phosphor"), PostModernCulture (PMC) in 1993, and "The Franc-tireur Silver Bullet," International Literary Prize in 2009. His writings have been translated and published in anthologies and journals in France, Germany, Italy, Spain, Finland, Belgium, Sweden, Japan, Brazil and the United States. He translated the work of Lyn Hejinian, John Ashbery, Robert Creeley, Charles Olson, Michael Palmer, Eliot Weinberger, Barrett Watten and others into Russian, and served as co-editor for The Anthology of Contemporary American Poetry in Russian Translation, as well as for The Anthology of Contemporary New Zealand Poetry.

Dragomoshchenko lectured in the Department of Philosophy at the St Petersburg State University, and provided seminars as a visiting professor at various institutes in the United States and Canada, including the University of California, San Diego, New York University, and the University at Buffalo. During the last years of his life he taught in the Smolny College of Liberal Arts and Science, an affiliate of Bard College.

== Literary style ==
Dragomoshchenko fused elements of poetry, essay, philosophy, journalism and fictional prose. He "explores the way our perceived and conceptual worlds are constructed through language. Self-consciousness, mannerism and a degree of abstraction are inevitable hazards in this territory, they are also concomitants of an individual voice obstinately pursuing its own themes. The fundamental characteristics of his work remain constant and may be summarized in the title of his first American translations — Description."

According to Marjorie Perloff, "for Dragomoshchenko, language is not the always already used and appropriated, the pre-formed and pre-fixed that American poets feel they must wrestle with. On the contrary, Dragomoshchenko insists that "language cannot be appropriated because it is perpetually incomplete" (...) and, in an aphorism reminiscent of Rimbaud's "Je est un autre," "poetry is always somewhere else." "

== Published works ==
=== Books translated in English ===
- Description. A book of poetry, translated by Lyn Hejinian and Elena Balashova. Introduction by Michael Molnar. LA: Sun & Moon Press, 1990.
- Xenia. A book of poetry, translated by Lyn Hejinian and Elena Balashova. LA: Sun & Moon Press, 1994.
- Chinese Sun. A novel, translated by Evgeny Pavlov. Eastern European Poets Series No. 9. New York, NY: Ugly Duckling Presse, 2005.
- Dust. Prose, translated by Evgeny Pavlov, Thomas Epstein, Shushan Avagyan and Ana Lucic. Urbana-Champaign, IL: Dalkey Archive Press, 2009.
- Endarkenment: Selected Poetry, edited by Eugene Ostashevsky, translated by Lyn Hejinian, Genyo Turovskaya, Eugene Ostashevsky, Bela Shayevich, Jacob Edmond, and Elena Balashova, with foreword by Lyn Hejinian. Middleton, Connecticut: Wesleyan University Press, 2014.

=== Books in Russian ===
- Nebo Sootvetstvii. [Sky of Correspondence] A book of poetry, Sovetskii Pisatel’ Press, Leningrad, 1990.
- Xenia. A book of poetry, Borei & Mitin Journal Press, St Peterburg, 1994.
- Phosphor. A book of prose, Severo-Zapad Press, St Petersburg, 1994.
- Pod Podozreniem. [Under Suspicion] A book of poetry, Borey-Art Press, St Petersburg, 1994.
- Kitajskoe Solnce. [Chinese Sun] A novel, Borey-Art Press & Mitin Journal, St Petersburg, 1997.
- Opisanie. [Selected] A book of poetry, Gumanitarnaia Akademia Press, St Petersburg, 2000.
- Na Beregakh Iskliuchennoj Reki. [On the Banks of an Excluded River] A book of poetry, OGI Press, Moscow, 2006.
- Bezrazlichia. [Indifferences] Collected prose, Borey-Art Press, St Petersburg, 2007.
- POP 3, with Margarita Meklina. Epistolary novel, Lulu Press, 2008.
- Shoaling Things. (co-authored by Jan Lauwereyns, with a drawing by Anne-Mie Van Kerckhoven) Ghent, Belgium: Druksel, 2011.
- Tavtologia. [Tautology] Collected poetry, Novoe Literaturnoe Obozrenie Press, Moscow, 2011.
- Ustranenie Neizvestnogo. [The Elimination of the Unknown]. Collected prose, Novoe Literaturnoe Obozrenie Press, Moscow, 2013.

== Awards ==
- Andrei Bely Independent Literary Prize, Leningrad, 1978.
- Electronic Text Award ("for poetry from Phosphor"), PostModernCulture (PMC), 1993.
- The Franc-tireur Silver Bullet, International Literary Prize (US), 2009.
