= Church of the Assumption of the Blessed Virgin Mary into Heaven, Telšiai =

Roman Catholic church in Telšiai, Lithuania

Church of the Assumption of the Blessed Virgin Mary into Heaven Švč. Mergelės Marijos Ėmimo į dangų bažnyčia
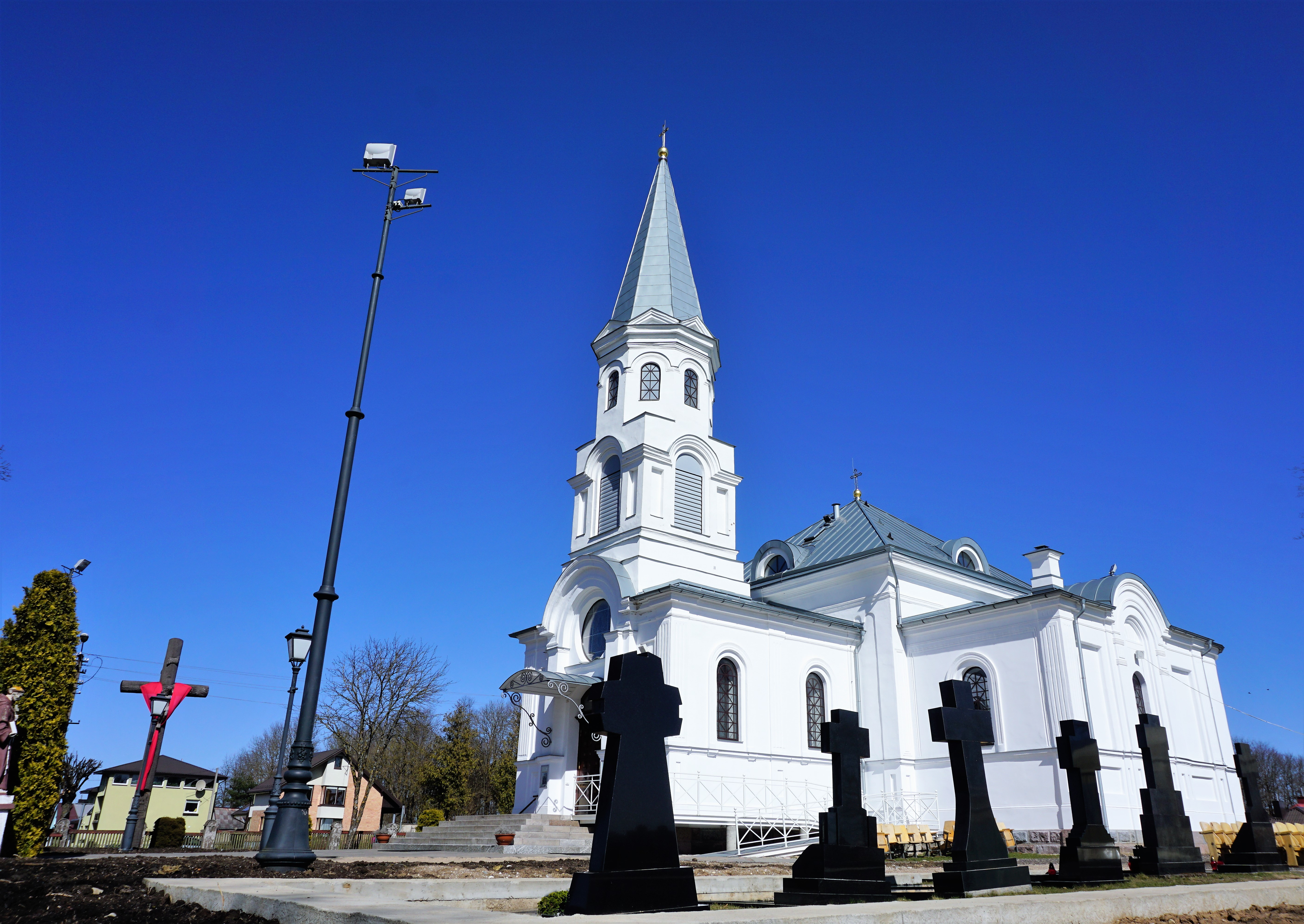

Religion
- Affiliation: Roman Catholic

Location
- Location: Telšiai, Lithuania
- Interactive map of Church of the Assumption of the Blessed Virgin Mary into Heaven; Švč. Mergelės Marijos Ėmimo į dangų bažnyčia
- Coordinates: 55°59′0″N 22°15′23″E

Architecture
- Type: Church
- Style: Neo-Gothic, Neo-Baroque, Neo-Byzantine
- Completed: 1867

Specifications
- Direction of façade: West
- Materials: masonry

The Church of the Assumption of the Blessed Virgin Mary into Heaven (Lithuanian: Švč. Mergelės Marijos Ėmimo į dangų bažnyčia) is a Roman Catholic church in Telšiai, Lithuania.

== History ==
The parish of Telšiai was established in 1536 and it is believed that at that time a church was also built by Sigismund the Old, Grand Duke of Lithuania. In 1612, a parish school was established at the church. The church was rebuilt in 1602 and 1700, but was damaged during the Great Northern War. Due to serious decay, the church was closed in 1815 and demolished in 1831. After the Uprising of 1863, Tsarist authorities built Orthodox Church of St. Nicholas the Wonderworker in 1867 at the same location. The church was of neo-Byzantine style and had richer décor than its Catholic predecessor. After the establishment of the Roman Catholic Diocese of Telšiai, Roman Catholics sued the Orthodox community demanding return of the church and the land. In 1932, both the land and the church were transferred to Roman Catholics. In 1935, the church was converted into a Catholic church.

== Architecture ==
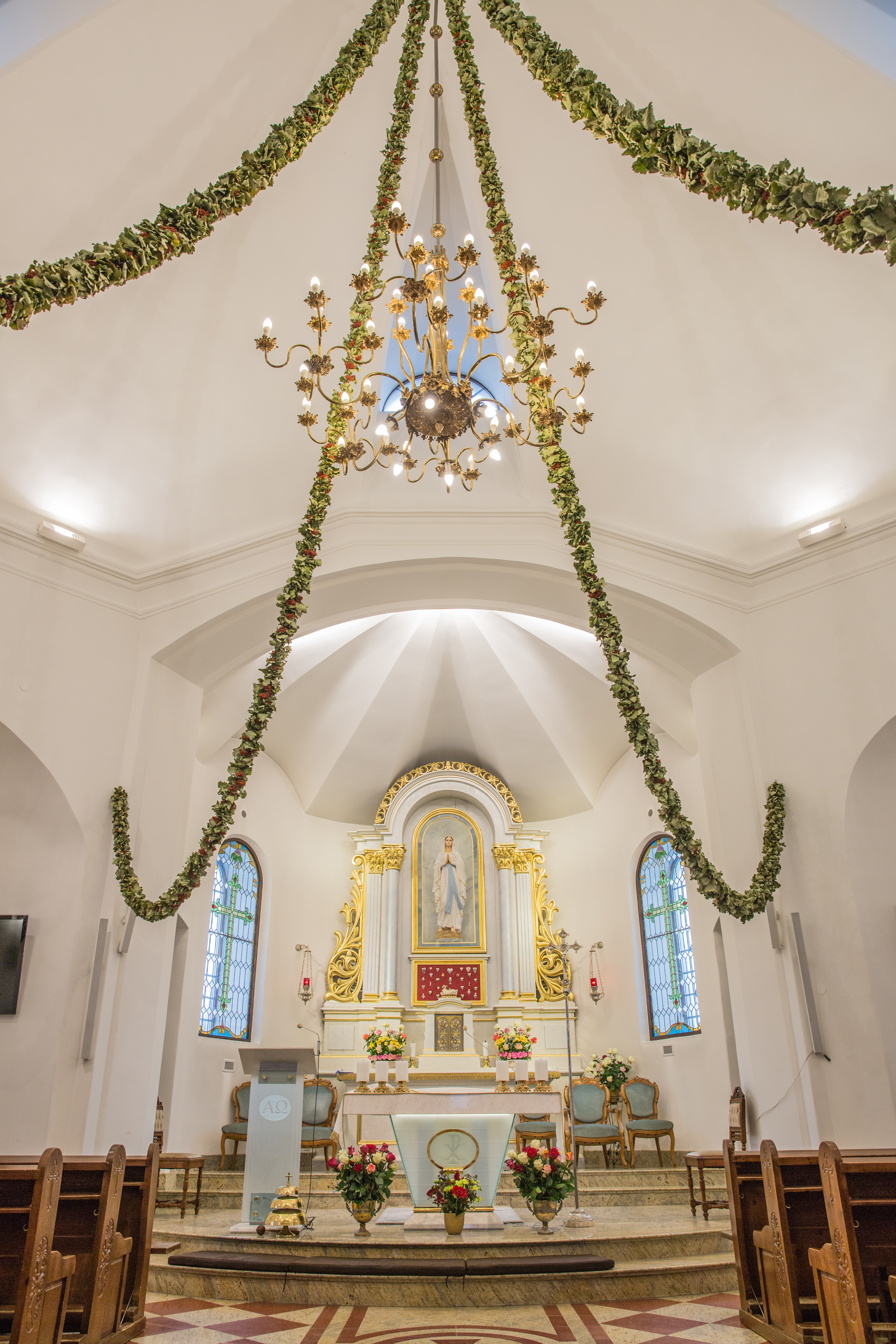
Main altar of the church

The Church reflects features of Gothic, Baroque and Byzantine Revival architectures. Its floor plan is cross-shaped. The Church has one tower and three altars. The fence of the churchyard is built using stone pillars and wood.

== Sources ==
- "Telšių vyskupija. Telšių Švč. M. Marijos Ėmimo į dangų parapija". telsiuvyskupija.lt.
- "Telšių Švč. Mergelės Marijos Ėmimo į dangų bažnyčia :: Bažnyčios Telšių rajone | Gyvenimo būdo žurnalas". www.ltvirtove.lt.
