= Telšiai =

Town in Samogitia Region, Lithuania

- City
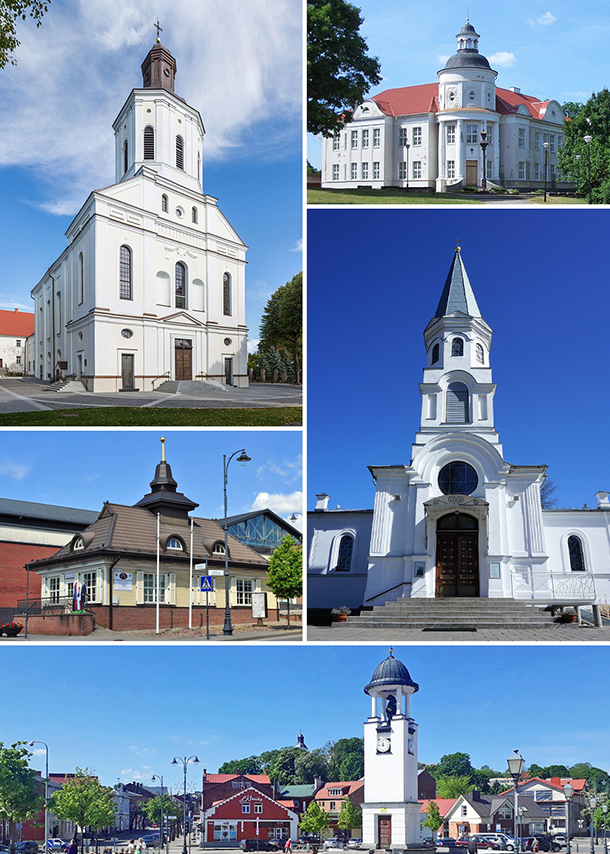
- Left to right:Telšiai Cathedral; Curia of the Roman Catholic Diocese of Telšiai; Tourism Center; Church of the Assumption of the Blessed Virgin Mary into Heaven, Telšiai; Telšiai Tower

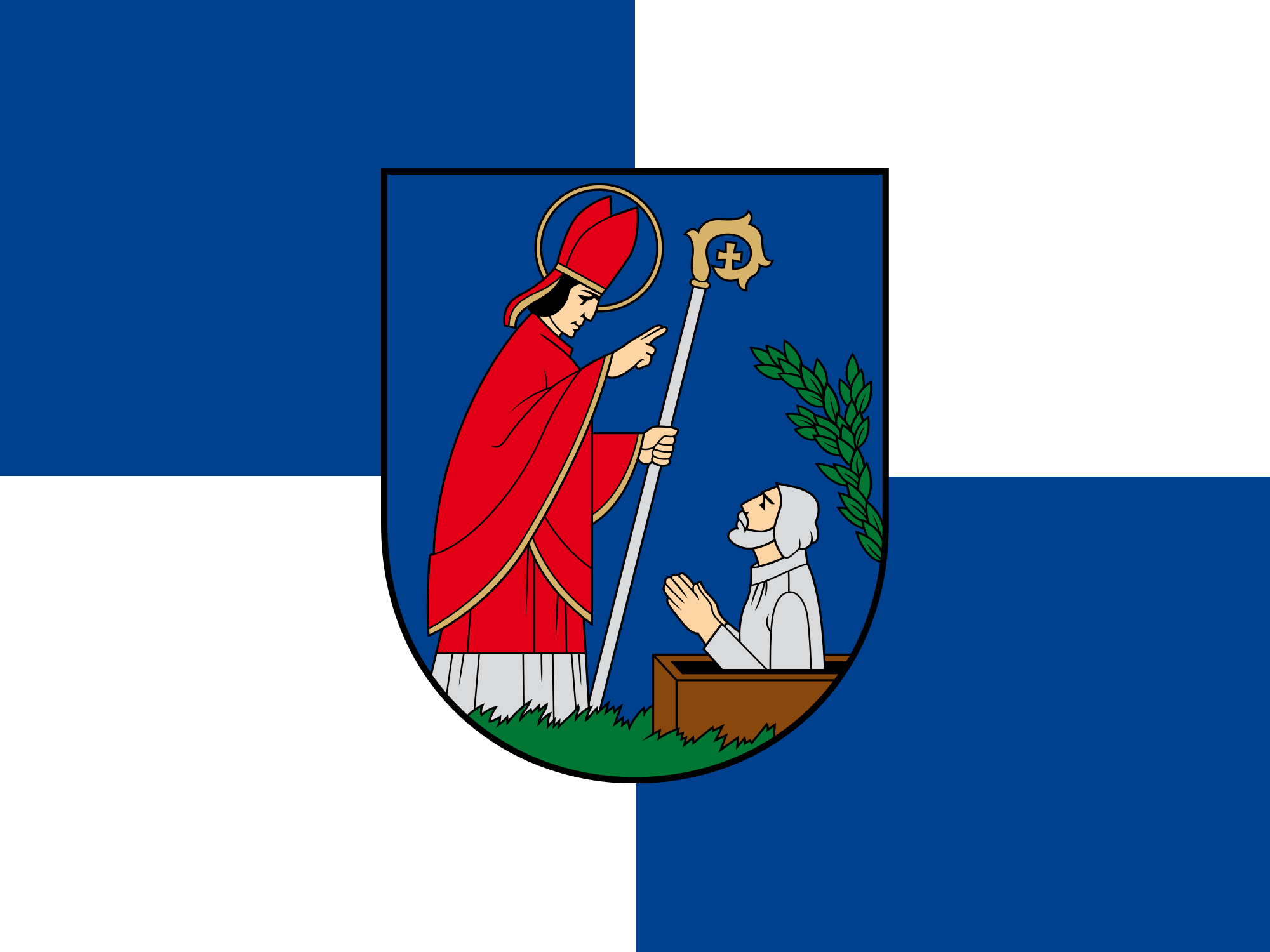
- Flag Coat of arms

- Location within Lithuania Location within the Baltic States Location within Europe
- Coordinates: 55°59′0″N 22°15′0″E
- Country: Lithuania
- Ethnographic region: Samogitia
- County: Telšiai County
- Municipality: Telšiai district municipality
- Eldership: Telšiai town eldership
- Capital of: Samogitia (unofficial); Telšiai County; Telšiai district municipality Telšiai town eldership Telšiai rural eldership
- First mentioned: 1450
- Granted city rights: 1791

Area
  - City: 17.5 km^{2} (6.8 sq mi)
- Elevation: 128 m (420 ft)

Population (2020)
  - City: 21,294
  - Density: 1,220/km^{2} (3,150/sq mi)
  - Metro: 45,474
- Demonym(s): Telšian(s) (English) telšiškiai (Lithuanian)
- Time zone: UTC+2 (EET)
  - Summer (DST): UTC+3 (EEST)
- Postal code: 87xxx
- Website: telsiai.lt

Telšiai (Samogitian: Telšē) is a city in Lithuania with about 21,499 inhabitants. It is the capital of Telšiai County and Samogitia region, and it is located on the shores of Lake Mastis.

Telšiai is one of the oldest cities in Lithuania, probably dating earlier than the 14th century. Between the 15th and 20th centuries, Telšiai became a district capital. Until 1795, Telšiai County formed the Duchy of Samogitia within the Grand Duchy of Lithuania. Between 1795 and 1802 it was included in the Vilnius Governorate. In 1873, Telšiai was transferred to the Kovno Governorate.

== Names ==
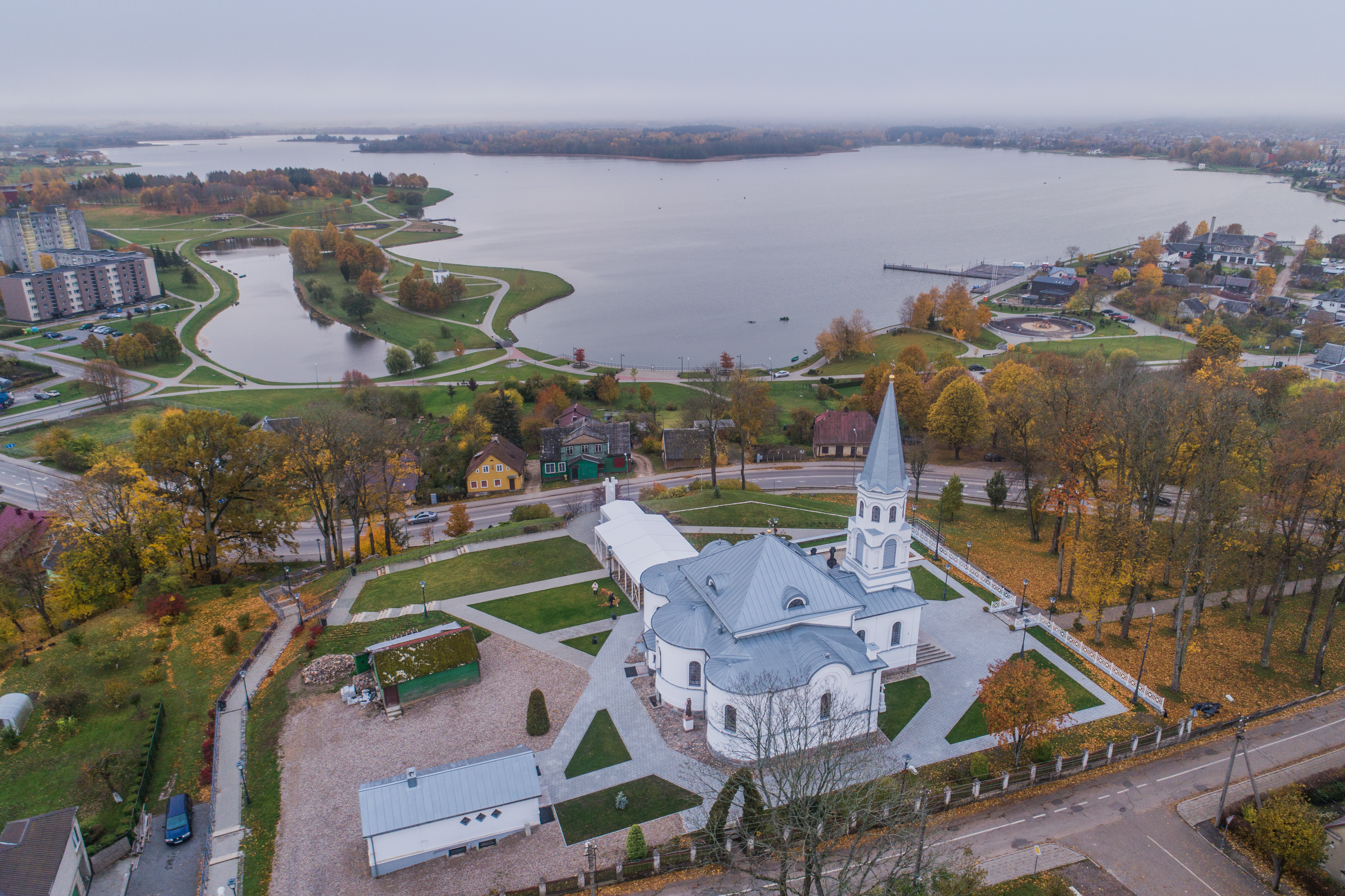
Aerial view towards the Mastis Lake from Telšiai centre

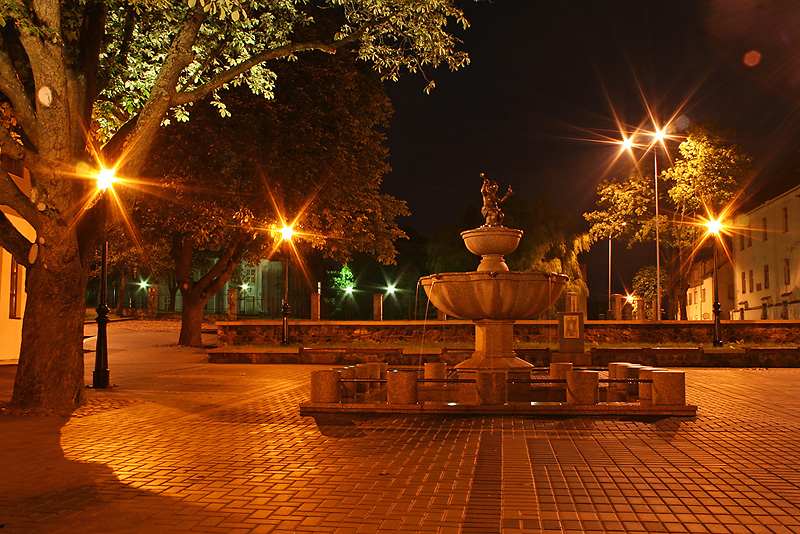
Cathedral square at night

The name Telšiai is a variant of the same Lithuanian language root (-telš-, -tilž-) as Tilžė or Talsi with the meaning connected to water. The name Telšiai or Telšē in Samogitian dialect of Lithuanian is derived from a verb telkšoti (literally, to be flooded with water, to splash, etc.). It is a cognate to the Greek thalassa - sea, compare the river Jūra - a sea flowing in the same longitude territory. It may also relate to the sum of 45° longitude of Greenwich as the core of Europe or also all western side or one fourth in the West of The Eastern Hemisphere.

The name of Telšiai has been recorded in different forms and different languages throughout its history. Most of them are derived from Telšē in Samogitian dialect. Some foreign names for the city include Latvian: Telši; German: Telschen, Telschi; Polish: Telsze; Russian: Тельшяй, Тельши, Тяльшяй. In Yiddish, the name is טעלז (Telz). In English sources, Telšiai are known also by several alternative names, including Telsiai, Telshi and Telschi.

== History ==
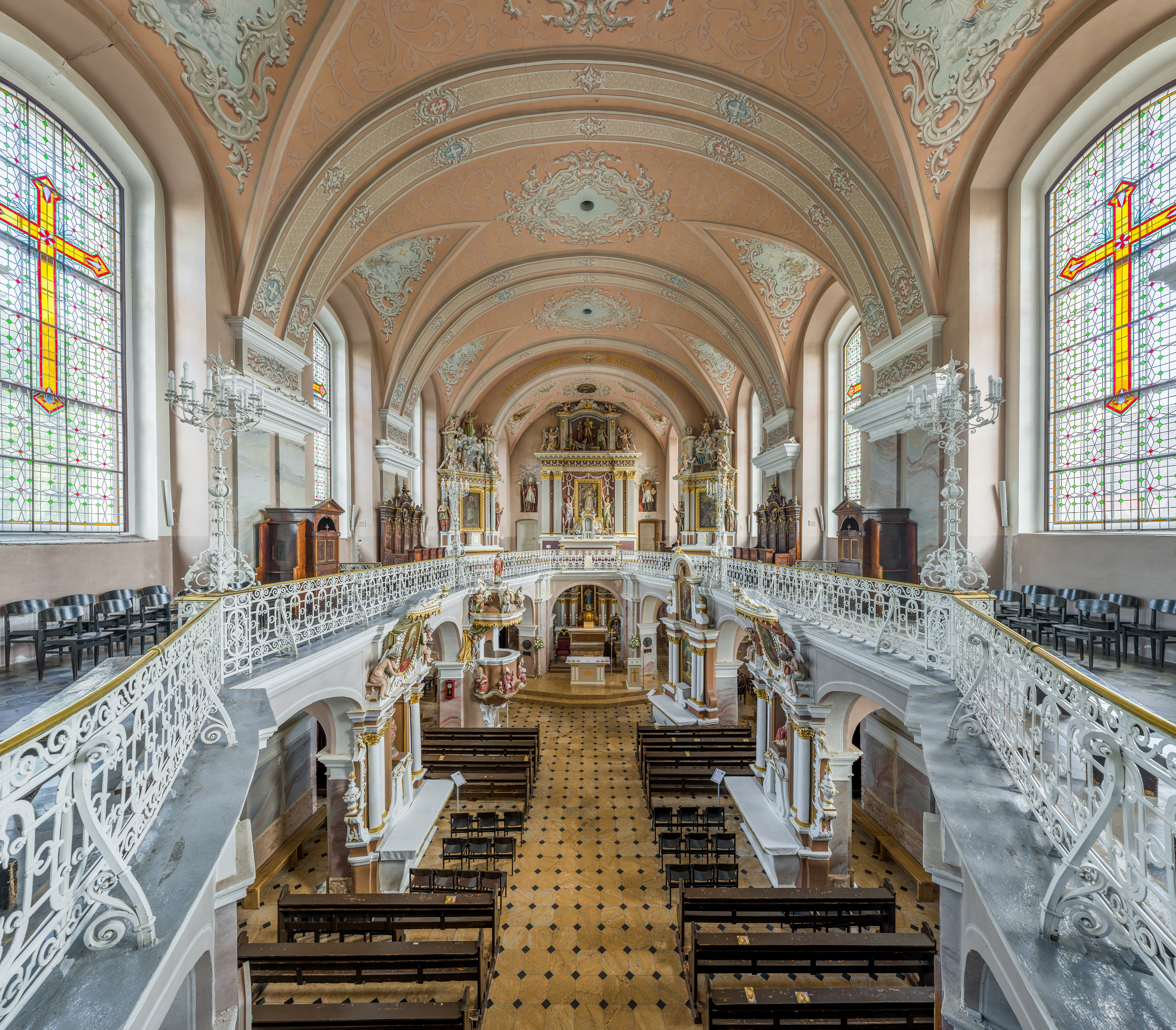
Interior of Telšiai Cathedral

Lake Mastis is mentioned in various legends and myths. The city was named after a small rivulet, the Telšė, which flows into Lake Mastis. A legend has it that a knight named Džiugas founded the city. First mentions of Telšiai date back to 1398, but the oldest archeological findings in the area of the city are from the Stone Age. In the 15th century, Telšiai already had a state-owned manor. It and the parish were governed by Samogitian elders. Telšiai was at the centre of an uprising of Samogitian peasants.

At the end of the 17th century Telšiai became the centre of culture and politics of Samogitia. Local parliaments known as Sejmiks composed of noblemen were organised in the city and a court was established. Magdeburg rights were granted to Telšiai in the 17th century. Until the Third Partition of Polish-Lithuanian Commonwealth in 1795, Telšiai County formed the Duchy of Samogitia in the Grand Duchy of Lithuania within the Polish–Lithuanian Commonwealth.

During the November uprising of 1831 Telšiai became a sanctuary for Polish–Lithuanian partisans fighting the Russians. A revolutionary government of insurrectionists was formed and schools for the preparation of military officers and noncommissioned officers were opened. During the Uprising of 1863, Telšiai was one of the main centres of uprise in Samogitia since insurrectionist forces massed there.

At the end of the 19th century Telšiai started to grow. A team of firemen formed, and a pharmacy and a theater were opened. In 1908 the very first Lithuanian concert–performance was organised. Telšiai was the birthplace and residence of famous Samogitian noble brothers: Stanisław Narutowicz (member of the Council of Lithuania) and Gabriel Narutowicz (the first President of Poland, who was assassinated).

The city survived two Polish revolutions, was conquered by the Germans in World War I, and occupied by the Red Army for a short time in 1918.

During the years of Lithuanian independence, 1918 to 1940, Telšiai grew rapidly. Several girls' and boys' high schools, a crafts school and a teacher's seminary were established. The Alka museum was built, and several cultural societies were operated. In 1935, Telšiai became the centre of county administration.

During the first Soviet occupation, as a result of the Molotov–Ribbentrop Pact, Telšiai became infamous for the nearby Rainiai massacre, a mass murder of 76 Lithuanian political prisoners perpetrated by the Red Army during the night of 24–25 June 1941.

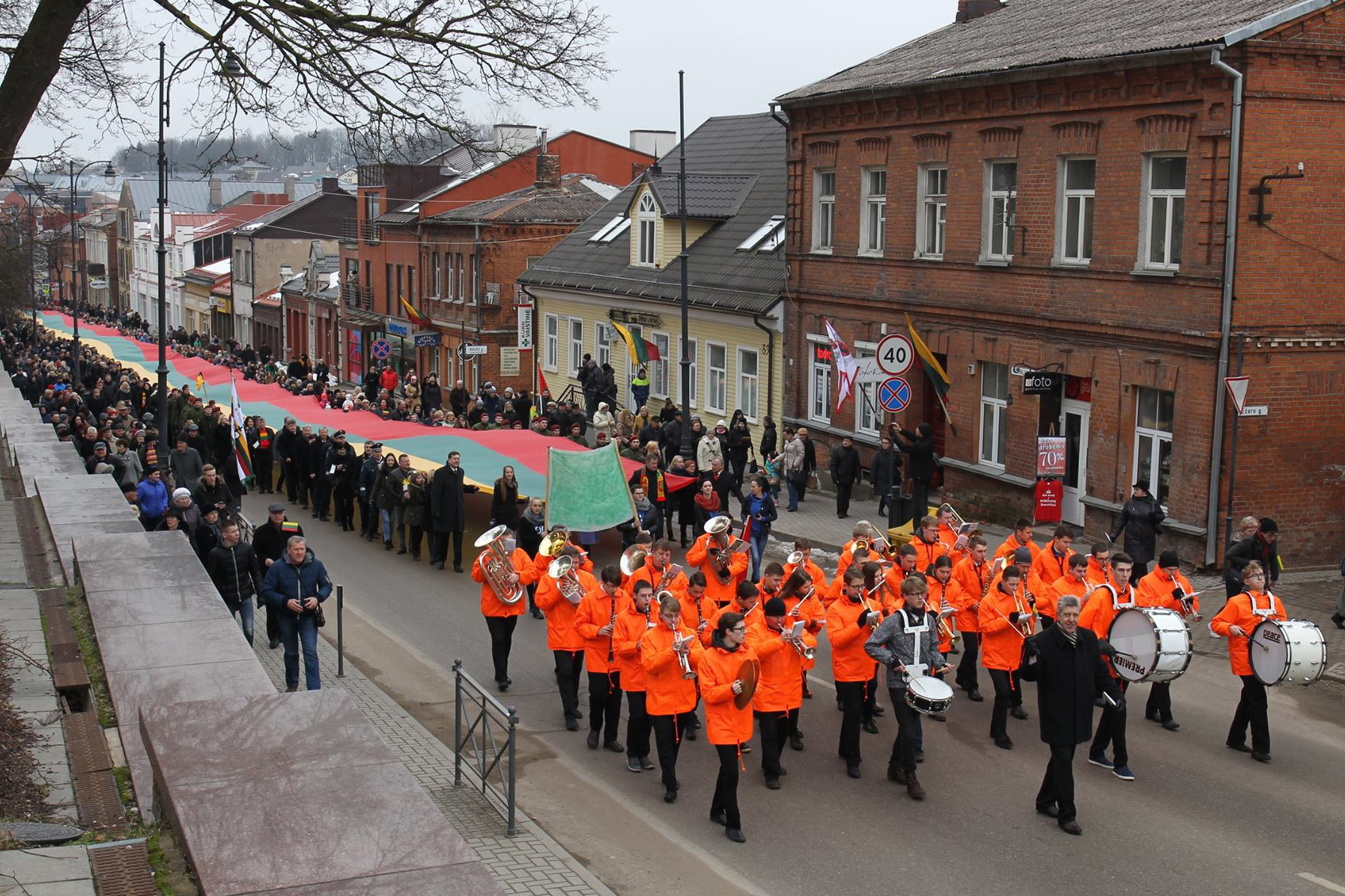
Street parade celebrating the 1918 Act of Independence of Lithuania

Nowadays Telšiai is the 12th largest city in Lithuania. It is the centre of Telšiai County and Telšiai district municipality. The city has four high schools, four secondary schools, and five primary schools. Department of Vilnius Academy of Art, College of Social Sciences and College of Samogitia are also established in Telšiai.

On 22 January 2013, the Ministry of Culture officially announced that Telšiai will be named the Lithuanian Capital of Culture in 2016.

=== Jews in Telšiai ===
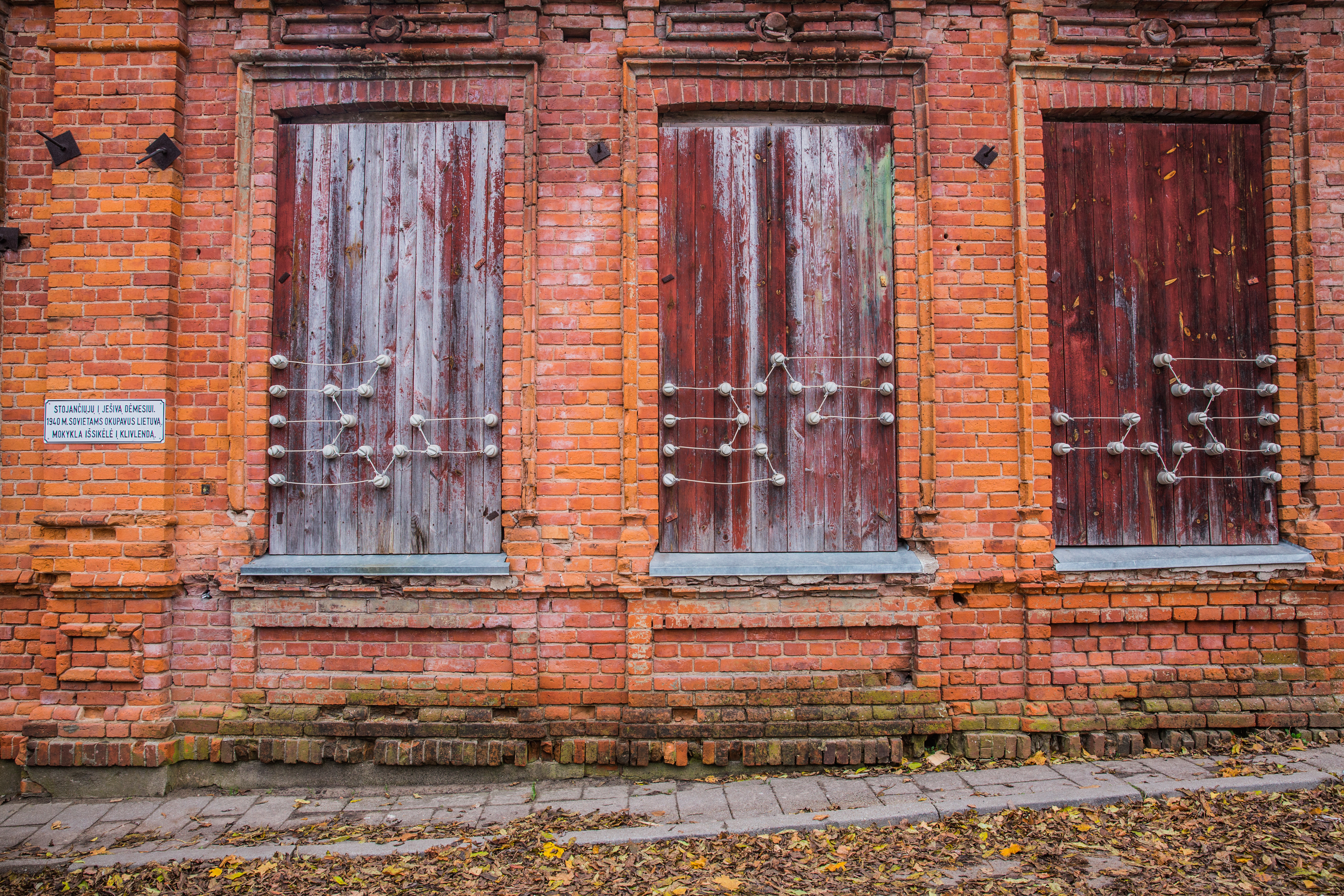
Telšiai Yeshiva building

In 1897, the Jewish population numbered 3088, 51% of the total population. Jews were expelled during World War I, but by 1939, only 2800 had returned, out of a general population of 8000. Many were involved in trade which included produce, wood, and crafts.

A major source of income was the famous Telšiai Yeshiva, (a school for Talmudic study, sometimes called a rabbinical college). It was the largest and most famous yeshiva in Lithuania between 1875 and 1941, establishing Telšiai as a center of Torah studies (the entire body of religious law and learning, including both sacred literature and oral tradition). There was also an Orthodox Jewish rabbinical seminary and a Jewish day school providing secular and religious instruction for younger children.

Following World War I and the expulsion of the Jews—which decimated the Telšiai Jewish community—the city again became a center of traditional Jewish learning. There were also charitable institutions, including a Chevra Kadisha (burial society), a hospital, a loan society, a public kitchen, a clinic, special summer camps, and a women's association for support of the sick and poor. There were also two Jewish newspapers, published in Yiddish.

In June 1940, following the Soviet occupation of Lithuania, Russians quickly closed down the yeshiva. Most of the students dispersed with only about a hundred students remaining in Telshe. Learning was done in groups of 20–25 students studying in various batai medrashim ("small synagogues") led by the rosh yeshivas.

The Holocaust in Telšiai (in Yiddish Telz) was carried out by the local Lithuanian leadership with occasional supervision by Nazi German units. The Jewish population in 1939 was 2,800 some 35 percent of the town's population. Further Jews found refuge in Telšiai following the 1939 German ultimatum to Lithuania. Telšiai was conquered by German troops on 25 June 1941. Jews were subjected to terror by the Germans and their Lithuanian collaborators and on 15–16 July all Jewish men were shot. The women were moved to a camp in Geruliai, and with the exception of 500–600 young women, were all shot on 30 August 1941. The 500–600 young women were moved back to a ghetto in Telšiai, and with the exception of some escapees, were shot on 30–31 December 1941. 64 Jewish survived after they escaped.

Telšiai has a rare surviving wooden synagogue.

The original Telšiai yeshiva building still stands. However, during the Soviet occupation it was transformed for industrial purposes and eventually neglected. It was renovated and opened as a Jewish museum in 2023.

The yeshiva was transplanted to the United States in 1941, during World War II, when two of its roshei yeshiva ("deans") who had escaped the Holocaust chose to re-establish it in Cleveland, Ohio, where it still remains. The yeshiva was opened in the house of Yitzchak & Sarah Feigenbaum on 20 Cheshvan 5702 (1941). This yeshiva again became a well-respected center of Talmudic study, incorporating the distinct methods of the historic institution, and it is still going strong today.

== Centre of Roman Catholic Diocese ==
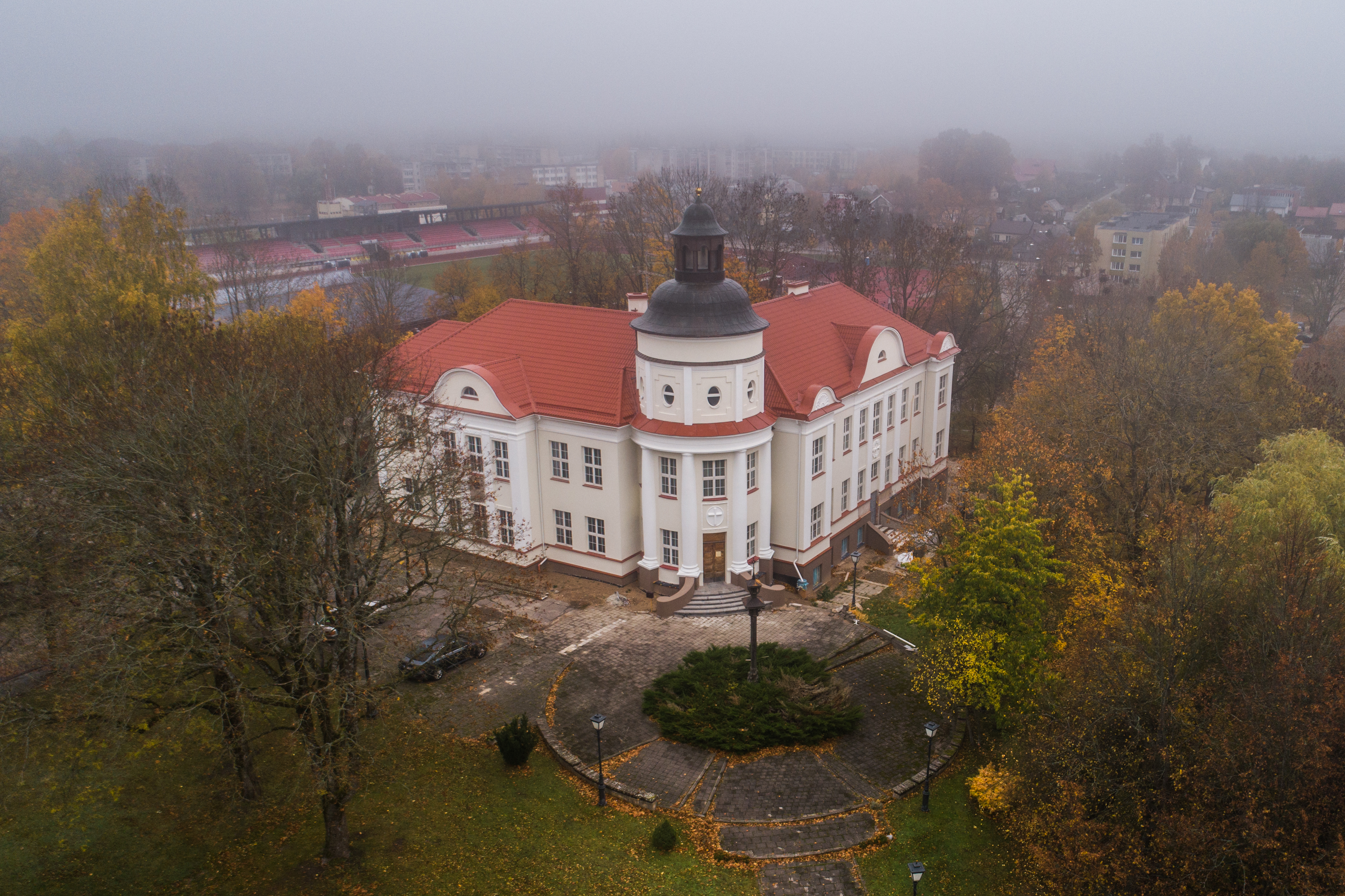
Curia of the Roman Catholic Diocese of Telšiai

A Roman Catholic Diocese of Telšiai was established in 1926 with its centre in Telšiai. Justinas Staugaitis, one of the twenty signatories to the Act of Independence of Lithuania, became the first bishop of the diocese.

In 1927, a Priest Seminary was established. It was closed in 1946 after the occupation of Lithuania by the Soviet Union but re-established at the end of the Cold War.

Present day architectural monuments include Telšiai Cathedral and the Church of The Assumption of the Blessed Virgin Mary into Heaven, Telšiai.

== Culture ==
Samogitian Museum Alka was established in 1932 by the Society of Ancient Samogitians' Fans Alka. The museum operated in a house specially rented for it until the current museum palace was built in 1938. Currently, Museum Alka is famous in Samogitia for its accumulation of over 62 thousand showpieces, 70 thousand pieces of estate archives, a 12 thousand book scientific library, and 15 thousand film negatives. The museum has a large historical exposition of Samogitia as well as a large collection of paintings of famous Lithuanian and foreign artists.

In the southern part of the city close to the Lake Mastis there is a city park with the Open-Air Museum of Rural Life of Samogitia. It was opened in 1983 and has an exposition of typical homesteads of 19th century Samogitia. Currently there are 16 authentic buildings. The museum exhibition is arranged in homestead sections: a rich farmer's grange; a barn; a poor farmer's grange, and a simple peasant's grange. Museum visitors can also get acquainted with a windmill, smithy, threshing barn and associated equipment.

=== Drama Theater and Culture Centre ===
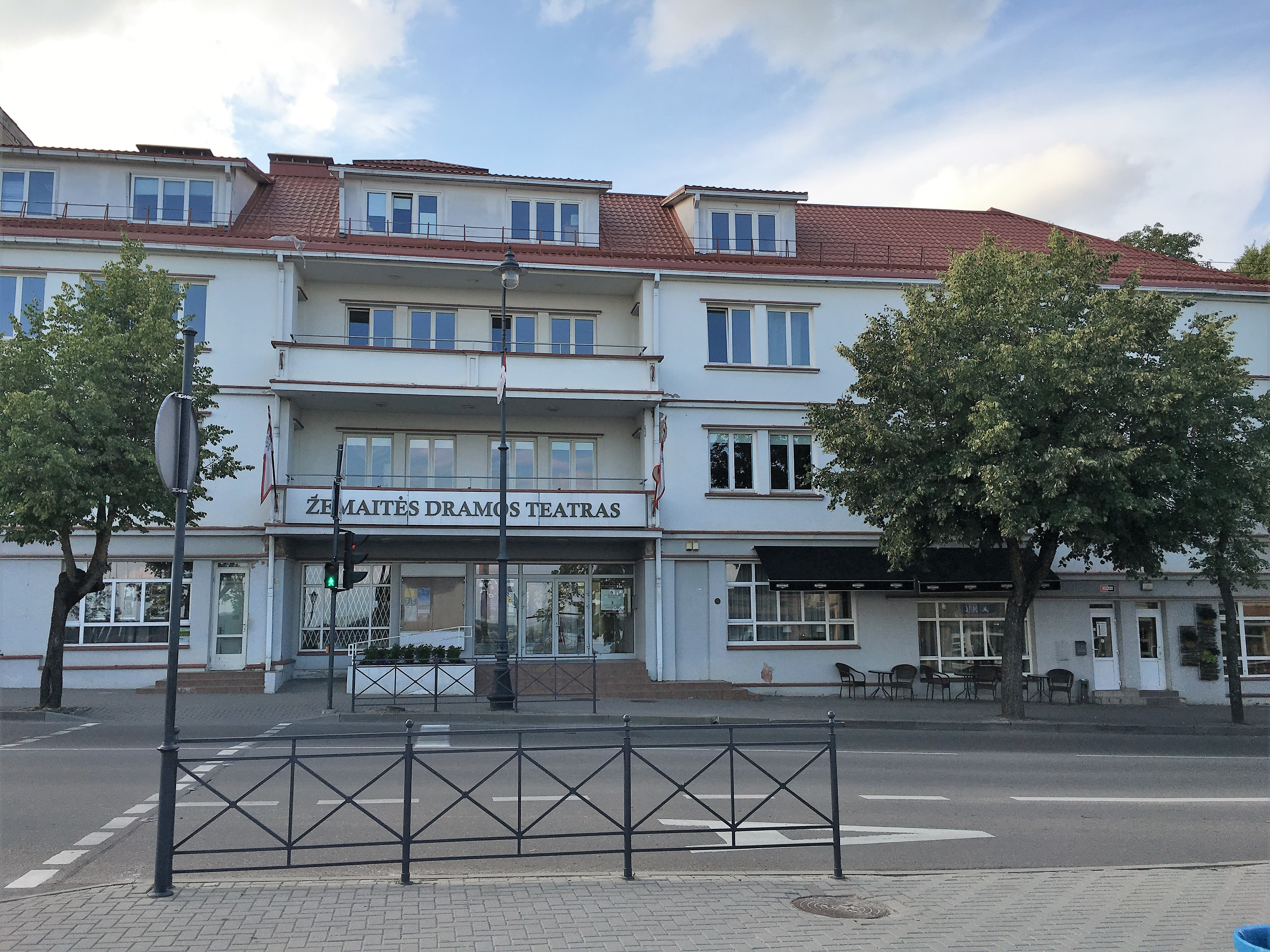
Žemaitė drama theatre

The Drama Theater of Žemaitė, named after famous Lithuanian author Žemaitė, is one of the oldest theaters in Lithuania. The origins of the theater in Telšiai starts in the beginning of the 20th century when student of arts and medicine Vaseris came back to Telšiai from Kyiv and presented two performances in the empty barracks of the town. The Theater is a member of the International Amateur Theatre Association. Nowadays it has two troupes of actors: adult actors (director K. Brazauskas) and youth Savi actors (director L. Pocevičienė). The head of the theater is Artūras Butkus.

Telšiai also has a Culture centre. It was established in 1946. Current building of the centre was built in 1974. Since 2007 the building is under reconstruction. Currently it has 13 art collectives.

=== Media in Telšiai ===
The main newspaper in the city and the region of Telšiai is Kalvotoji Žemaitija (Hilly Samogitia), which was established on 19 April 1941. It is published three times a week and is available online. The second largest newspaper of Telšiai is Telšių žinios (The News of Telšiai) established on 1 October 1999. It is published twice a week and is also available online.

The main online portal for the city is www.telsiai.info, which is part of the group of portals miestunaujienos.info.

=== Library ===
The main library is the Telšiai Karolina Praniauskaitė Regional Public Library, located in the city centre. It was established in 1922. In 1967 it was named as the best district library in Lithuania. In 1997, the library was named after Karolina Praniauskaitė, the first female poet of Samogitia.

=== Food and cuisine ===
Telšiai is famous for its Samogitian food and rich gastronomical traditions.

- Samogitian pancakes (Žemaičių blynai) – flat pancakes made from coarse potato puree filled with minced meat.
- Kastinys – sour cream "butter"; sour cream is kneaded and washed until it forms a soft spread.
- Hard cheese – samogitians started fermenting hard cheese around the 16th century.

== Tourism ==
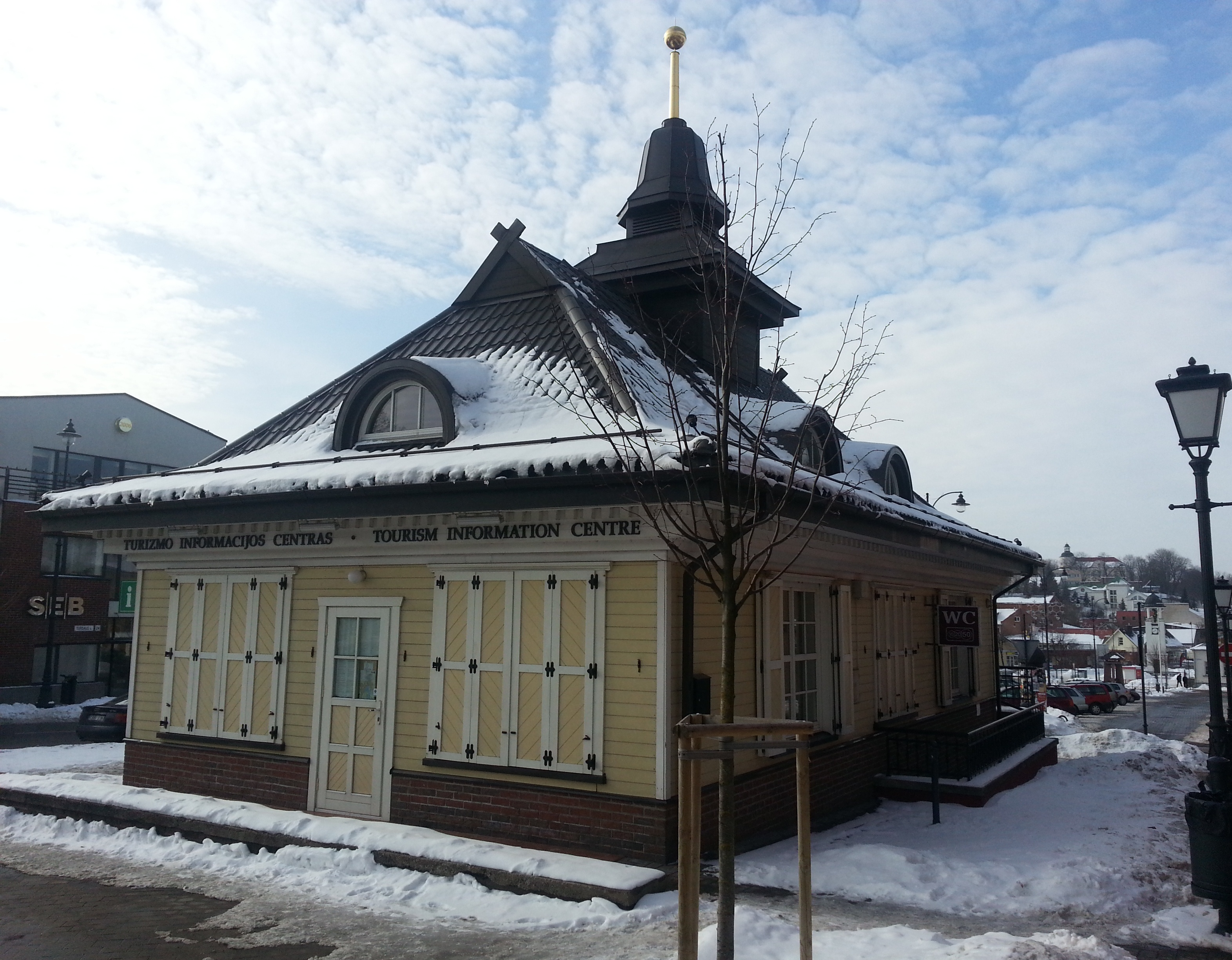
Tourism information center

The old town of the city of Telšiai is one of seven protected old towns in Lithuania. The main tourist attractions are:

- The Samogitian museum "ALKA" and Open-Air Museum of Rural Life of Samogitia.
- 47 bear sculptures of various sizes and shapes in Telšiai city. The bear is an ancient symbol of Samogitia.
- Cheese house-museum "DŽIUGAS".
- A.Jonušo Samogitian-Japanese-Chinese Homestead-Museum.
- Shore of the lake Mastis and sculpture park.
- Telšiai Cathedral and Telšiai Bishop Vincentas Borisevičius Priest Seminary (on the top floor it is possible to see a panorama of the city).
- The Church of The Assumption of the Blessed Virgin Mary into Heaven, Telšiai (known as the "Little Church"), Telšiai yeshiva and Orthodox Church of St. Nicolaus.

A Tourist Information Center can be found in the city centre. Telšiai was announced as tourists destination by EDEN in 2013.

== Geography ==
Telšiai is located in the middle of the Samogitian Heights. The city was built on seven hills on the shores of Lake Mastis. The nearby Šatrija hill and hillfort is cultural monument and part of a nature preserve.

=== Climate ===
Climate data for Telšiai (1991-2020 normals, extremes 1961-present)
Month	Jan	Feb	Mar	Apr	May	Jun	Jul	Aug	Sep	Oct	Nov	Dec	Year
Record high °C (°F)	8.7 (47.7)	12.6 (54.7)	19.3 (66.7)	27.5 (81.5)	30.0 (86.0)	32.8 (91.0)	32.2 (90.0)	31.9 (89.4)	28.5 (83.3)	23.2 (73.8)	16.4 (61.5)	10.4 (50.7)	32.8 (91.0)
Mean daily maximum °C (°F)	−0.6 (30.9)	−0.1 (31.8)	4.2 (39.6)	11.6 (52.9)	17.5 (63.5)	20.5 (68.9)	22.9 (73.2)	22.1 (71.8)	16.9 (62.4)	10.3 (50.5)	4.5 (40.1)	1.0 (33.8)	10.9 (51.6)
Daily mean °C (°F)	−2.7 (27.1)	−2.5 (27.5)	0.7 (33.3)	6.7 (44.1)	12.1 (53.8)	15.5 (59.9)	18.0 (64.4)	17.2 (63.0)	12.5 (54.5)	7.0 (44.6)	2.5 (36.5)	−0.9 (30.4)	7.2 (45.0)
Mean daily minimum °C (°F)	−4.9 (23.2)	−4.9 (23.2)	−2.2 (28.0)	2.4 (36.3)	7.1 (44.8)	10.9 (51.6)	13.6 (56.5)	13.0 (55.4)	9.0 (48.2)	4.3 (39.7)	0.6 (33.1)	−2.9 (26.8)	3.8 (38.8)
Record low °C (°F)	−36.4 (−33.5)	−34.6 (−30.3)	−25.0 (−13.0)	−15.9 (3.4)	−5.9 (21.4)	−0.1 (31.8)	4.4 (39.9)	3.4 (38.1)	−3.5 (25.7)	−8.4 (16.9)	−22.0 (−7.6)	−29.3 (−20.7)	−36.4 (−33.5)
Average precipitation mm (inches)	69 (2.7)	55 (2.2)	45 (1.8)	38 (1.5)	46 (1.8)	67 (2.6)	84 (3.3)	83 (3.3)	72 (2.8)	88 (3.5)	71 (2.8)	77 (3.0)	795 (31.3)
Average precipitation days (≥ 1.0 mm)	9	7	9	8	8	9	11	11	11	9	12	12	116
Average relative humidity (%)	86	83	77	69	67	71	73	76	81	85	88	88	79
Mean monthly sunshine hours	43.1	64.0	146.6	212.7	290.3	285.3	294.3	261.0	182.1	110.8	39.9	30.0	1,960.1
Source 1: Lithuanian Hydrometeorological Service
Source 2: NOAA (extremes, precipitation days 1961-1990)

== Government of Telšiai ==
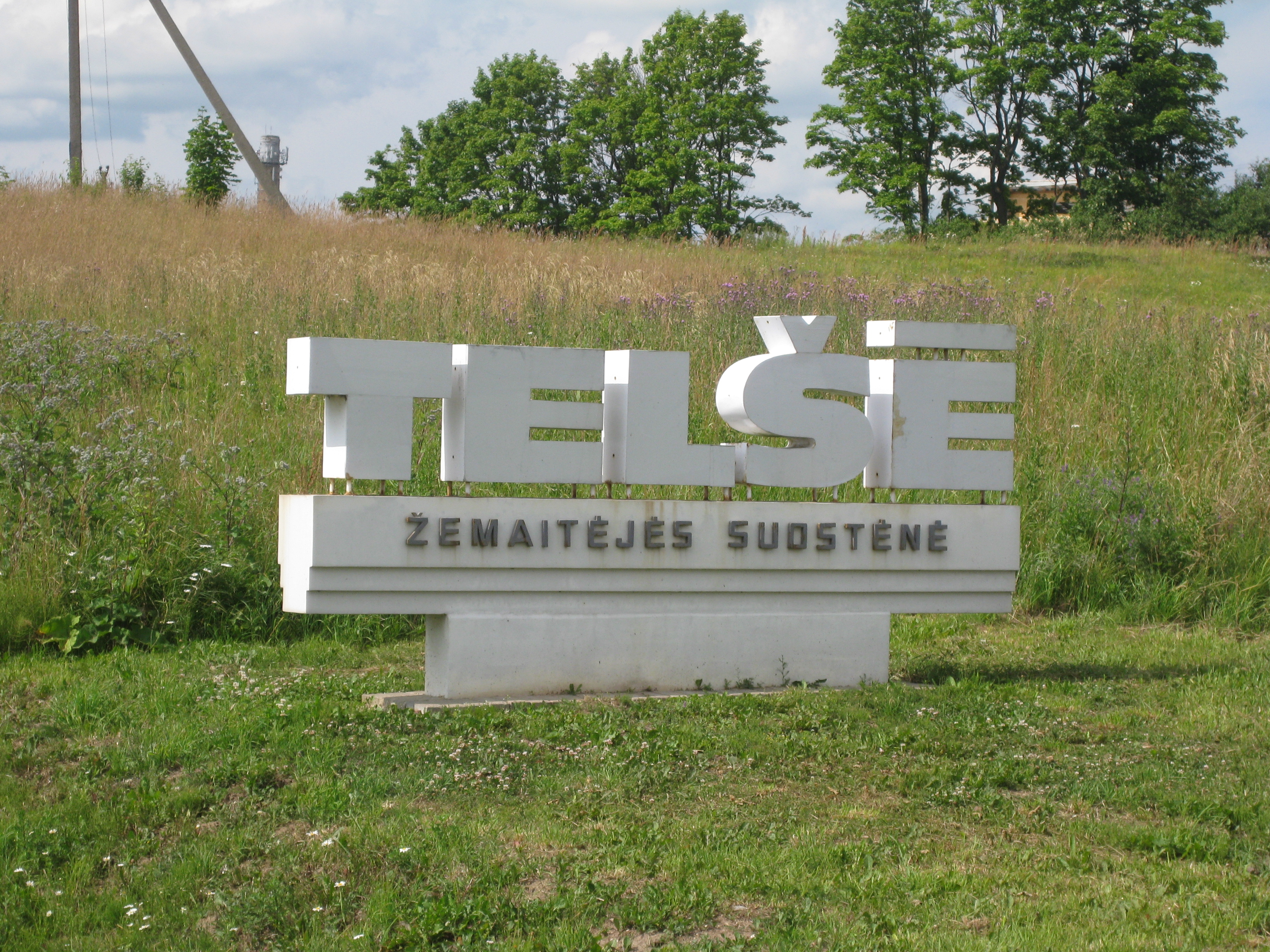
Telšiai sign in Samogitian dialect

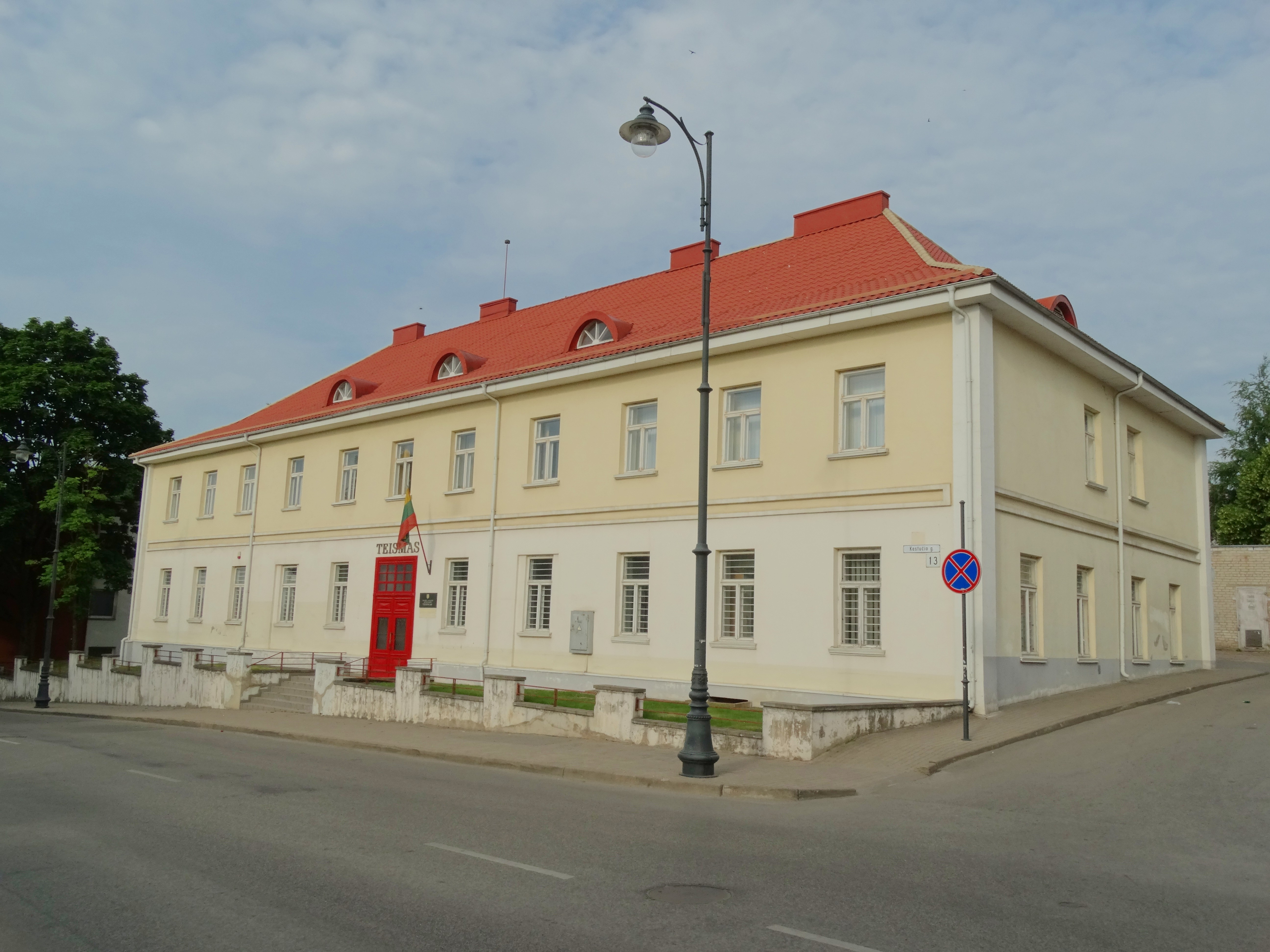
District Court of Telsiai

According to the Law on the Territorial Administrative Units and Their Boundaries of the Republic of Lithuania, Telšiai is the centre of Telšiai County as well as the centre of Telšiai district municipality.

The city of Telšiai is also the centre of Telšiai town eldership. It was established in 1997. Its area is 16.4 km^{2} (6.33 sq mi). According to 2006 statistics, the density of the eldership is 1862 žm./km^{2}. Telšiai city eldership has six sub-elderships, whose purpose is to represent communities of inhabited places. The sub-elderships are: Germantas; Karalius Mindaugas (King Mindaugas), Luokė, Mastis, Naujamiestis and Senamiestis.

== Economy ==
Telšiai is an important economic centre of Samogitia. Affiliates of major Lithuanian banks, shopping centers, etc. operate there, and some industrial companies have also been established. The largest company operating in the city is AB Žemaitijos pienas, one of the largest milk processing companies in Lithuania.

In Telšiai the "Incubator of Business of Telšiai County" was established in order to help new businessmen who want to start their own business as well as to stimulate the establishment of new workplaces.

In September 2012 it was announced that according to the data of the Lithuanian Department of Statistics the average salary of Lithuania grew the most rapidly in Telšiai in the second quarter of 2012.

== Education ==
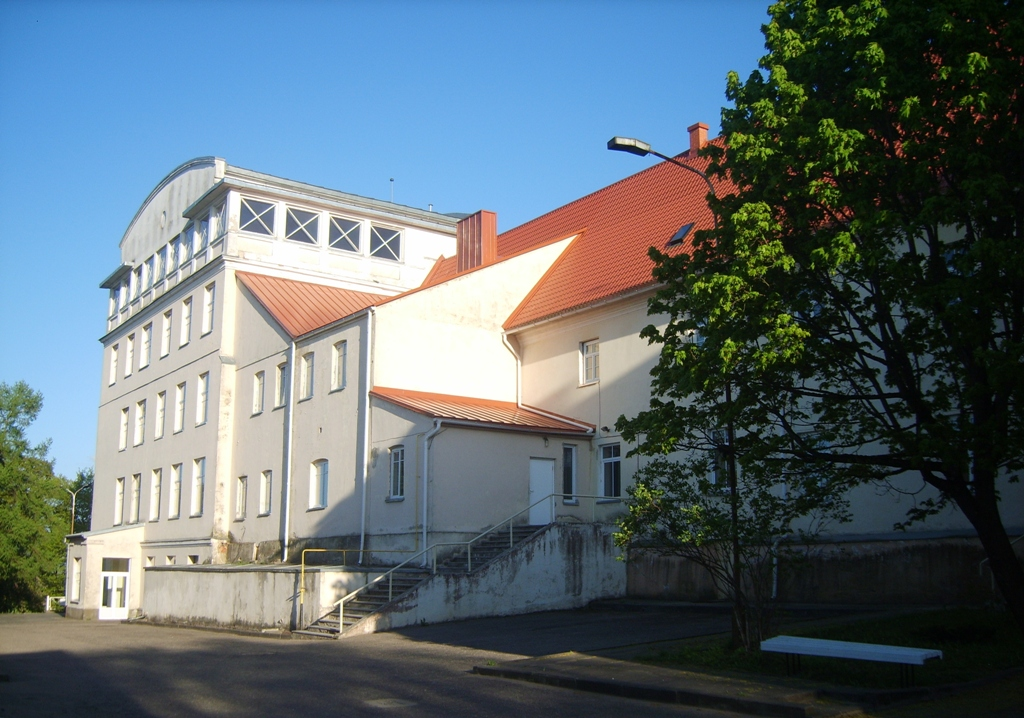
Telšiai Bishop Vincentas Borisevičius Priest Seminary

Telšiai is one of three Lithuanian cities where a Roman Catholic Priest Seminary operates (the other two cities are Vilnius and Kaunas).

=== Universities and colleges ===
- Telšiai Bishop Vincentas Borisevičius Priest Seminary
- Department of Telšiai of Vilnius Academy of Art
- Department of Arts and Pedagogics of College of Samogitia
- Branch of College of Social Sciences

=== Gymnasiums and secondary schools ===
- Žemaitė Gymnasium
- Vincentas Borisevičius Catholic Gymnasium
- Džiugas Gymnasium
- Germantas progymnasium
- Krantas progymnasium
- Ateitis progymnasium
- Atzalynas progymnasium
- Secondary School of Adults

== Sports ==
The football club FK Mastis Telšiai played in the Lithuanian Football Federation's II league's western zone. The team won silver medals in 2012 and qualified for the I Lyga. In 2014 team was renamed FK Džiugas. The same year the team finished second in the LFF II league's western zone. FK Džiugas now plays in the I Lyga. Telšiai has a football stadium with a capacity of about 3000. It was under reconstruction since 2010 until 2016 in order to meet international requirements. The reconstructed stadium was opened on 15 May 2016. The LFF Cup final between FK Žalgiris and FK Trakai was the first game in the renewed stadium.

Telšiai basketball club "Telšiai" was founded in 2012. In 2015 the club won the third tier Regional Basketball League title and since 2015–2016 season the team plays in the National Basketball League, in Telšiai Arena for Sports (since 2017). The team finished third in 2016–2017 National Basketball League regular season but lost in the quarter-finals. In 2017–2018 the team lost in the first round of playoffs. One year after in 2019 Telšiai qualified to the League's playoffs and finished third winning bronze medals for the first time in club's history.

From 1992 until 1998 Telšiai also had men's ice hockey team Germantas which played in the Lithuania Hockey League which is the premier men's ice hockey league in Lithuania. In 1996 the team finished first in the regular season but lost in the playoff finals.

== Transport ==
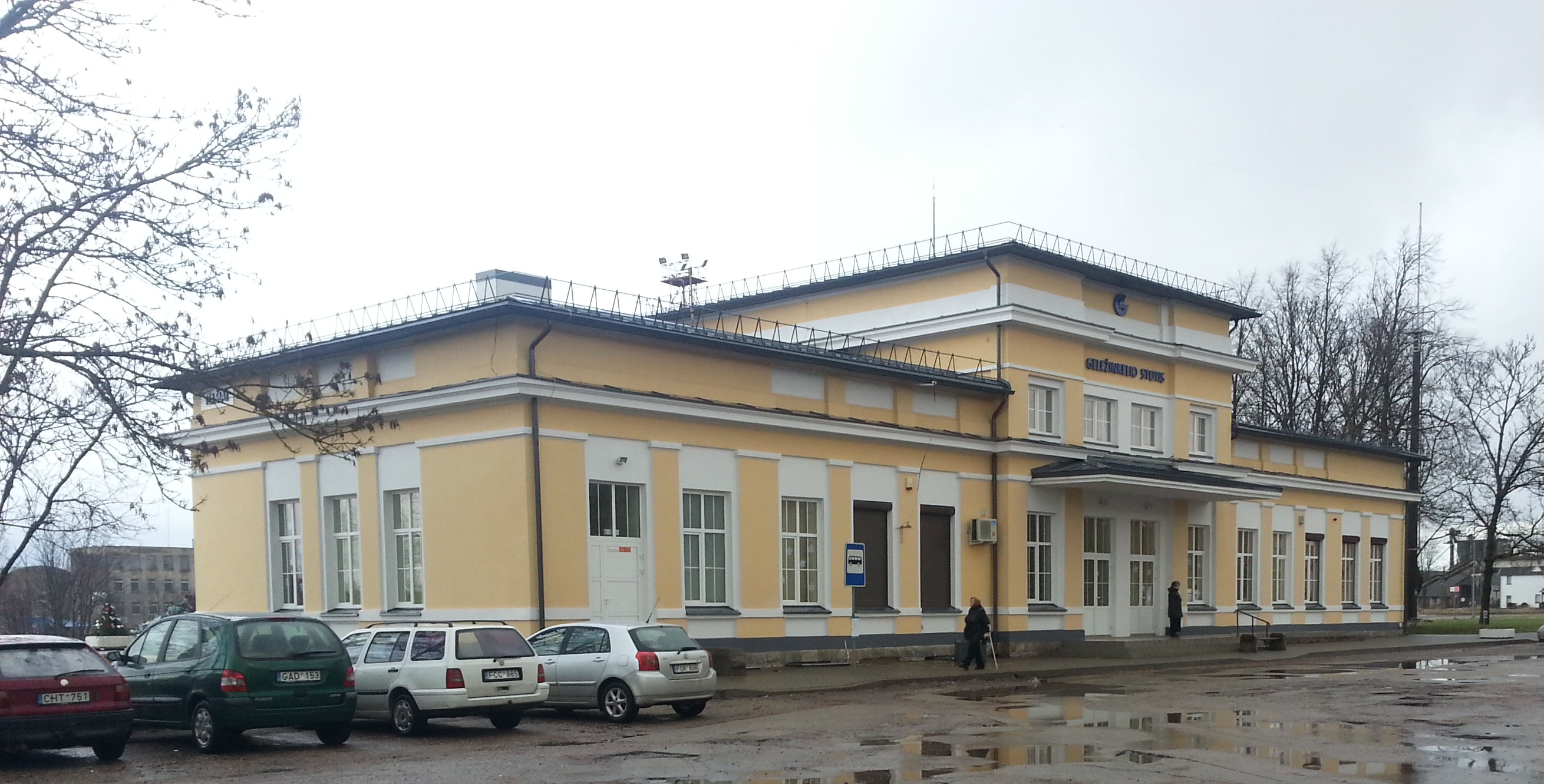
Telšiai Railway Station

An important highway passing through Telšiai is the route A11 highway from Šiauliai to Palanga. Trains going on the routes Vilnius–Klaipėda and Radviliškis–Klaipėda pass through the Telšiai railway station. Telšiai can also be reached by bus from many Lithuanian cities and smaller towns in Telšiai county. Telšiai bus station is located near the city centre.

Telšiai has a municipal public bus system with seven routes. Buses run from 6 am until 8 pm and tickets are sold directly in buses, although there is also an opportunity to buy monthly tickets. Telšiai also has shuttle taxis.

== Demographics ==
According to the 2021 census, the city population was 22,642 people, of which:

- Lithuanians – 97.14% (21,994)
- Russians – 1.36% (308)
- Ukrainians – 0.14% (31)
- Belarusians – 0.09% (21)
- Poles – 0.06% (14)
- Others / did not specify – 1.23% (279)

== Twin towns – sister cities ==
City's partners

Telšiai is twinned with:

- Sävsjö, Sweden, since 1997
- Liezen, Austria, since 1998
- Krnov, Czech Republic, since 2001
- Kreis Steinfurt, Germany, since 2005
- Mińsk Mazowiecki, Poland, since 2006
- Lebedin, Ukraine, since 2008
- Bassum, Germany, since 2009
- Saint-Égrève, France, since 2017
- Obdach, Austria, since 2017
- (Georgia (country)) Mestia, Georgia, since 2018

== Famous people ==
In chronological order by their birth year:

- Eliezer Gordon (1840–1910), Rabbi and Rosh Yeshiva
- Ilya Fadeyevich Tsion (1843–1912), physiologist
- Vladimir Sukhomlinov (1848–1926), general of the Imperial Russian Army
- Stanisław Narutowicz (1862–1932), politician, signatory of the Act of Independence of Lithuania
- Gabriel Narutowicz (1865–1922), first President of Poland
- Wilfrid Michael Voynich (1865–1930), revolutionary, eponym of the Voynich manuscript
- Michael Noyk (1884–1966), Irish Republican and solicitor, born in Telšiai
- Vladas Petronaitis (1888–1941), soldier and lawyer imprisoned in Telšiai prior to execution by the NKVD in the Rainiai massacre
- Justas Paleckis (1899–1980), Lithuanian journalist and nominal head of state of the Lithuanian SSR
- Rolandas Paksas (b. 1956), President of Lithuania
- Alfredas Bumblauskas (b. 1956), Lithuanian historian
- Egidijus Aleksandravičius (b. 1956), Lithuanian historian
- Nijolė Narmontaitė (b. 1959), Lithuanian actress
- Jurga Šeduikytė (b. 1980), Lithuanian singer
- Danguolė Rasalaitė (1983-2000), Lithuanian victim of human trafficking
- Giedrius Arlauskis (b. 1987), Lithuanian footballer

== Gallery ==
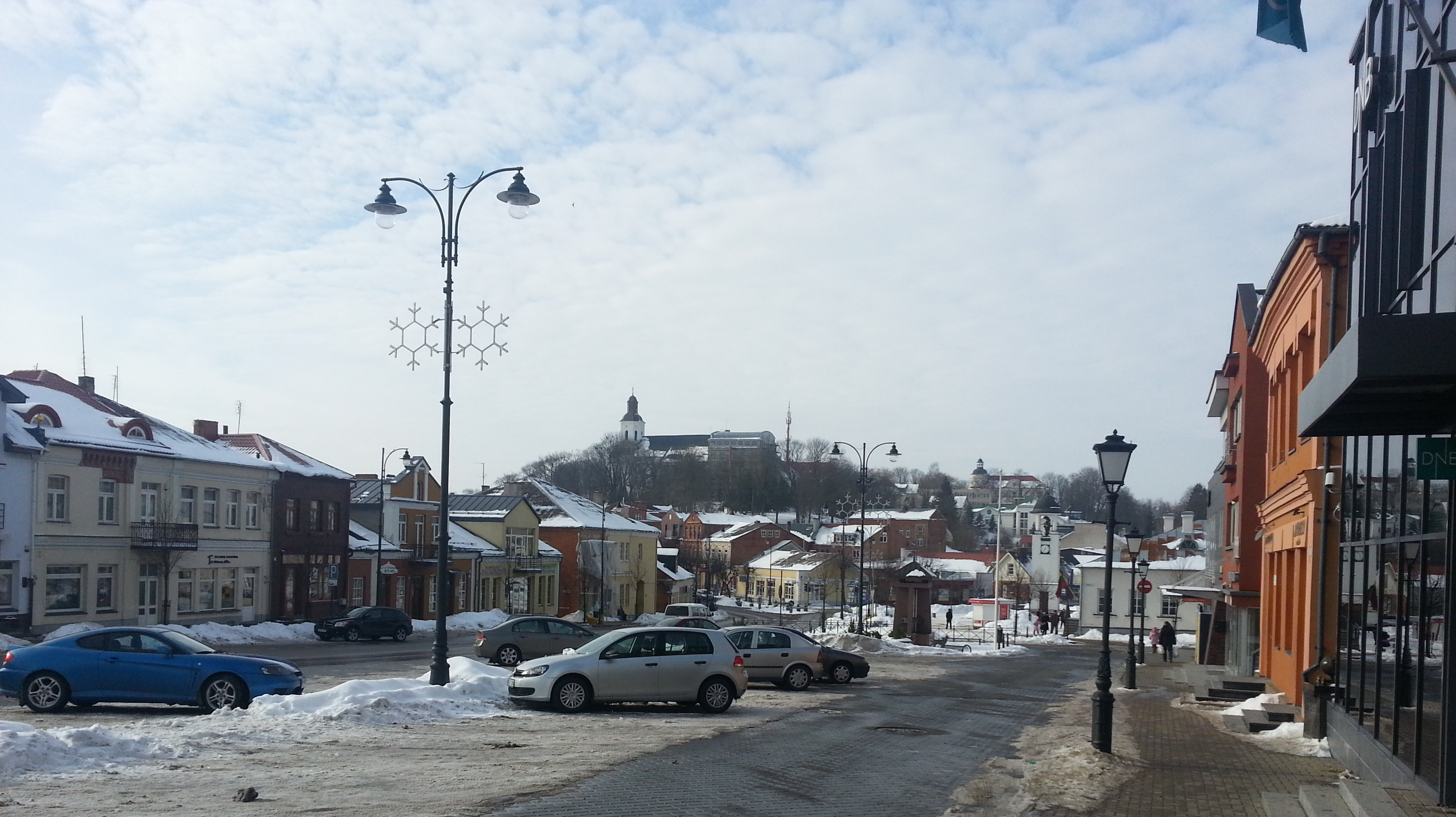
Telšiai old town

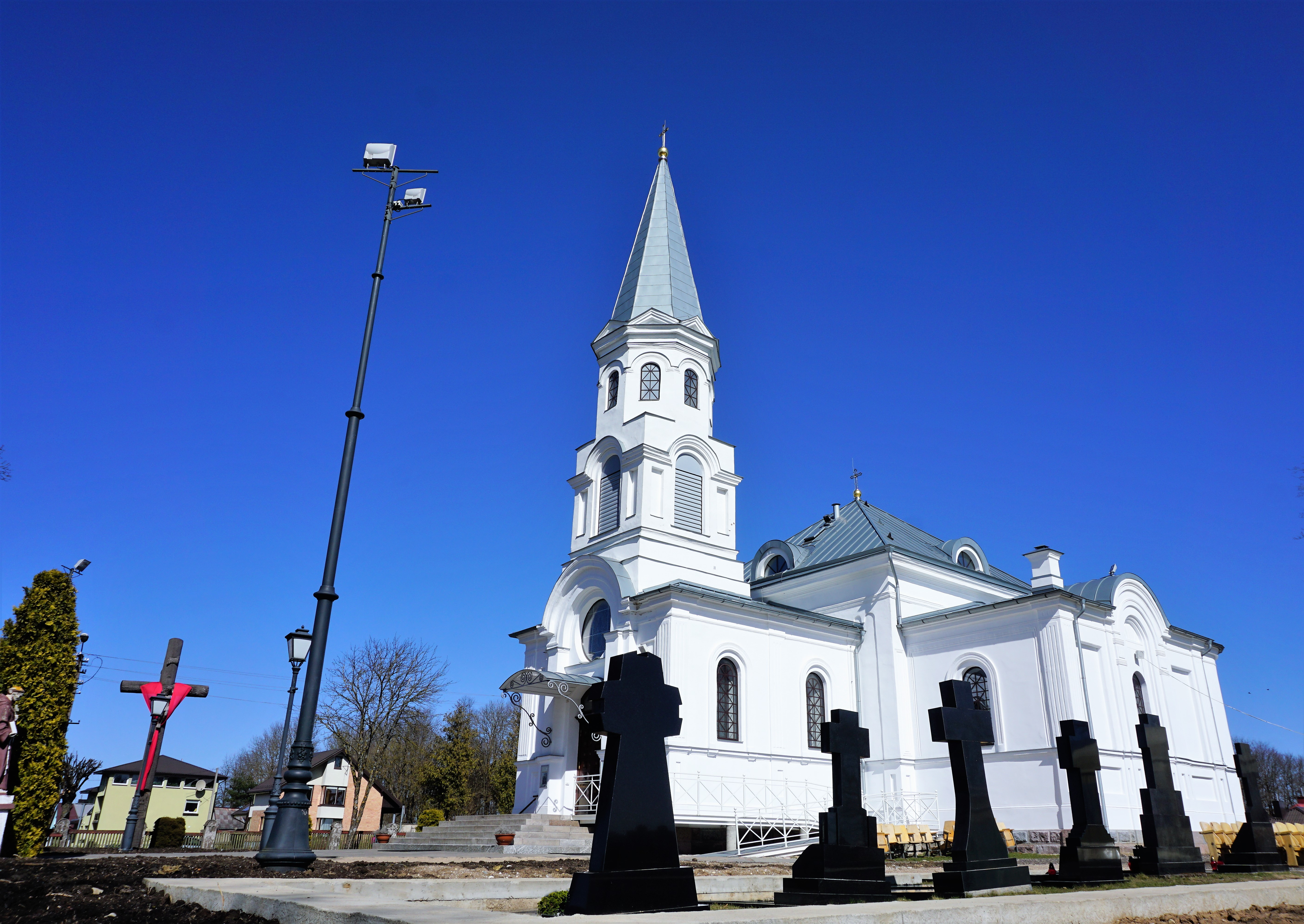
Church of the Assumption of the Blessed Virgin Mary into Heaven, Telšiai

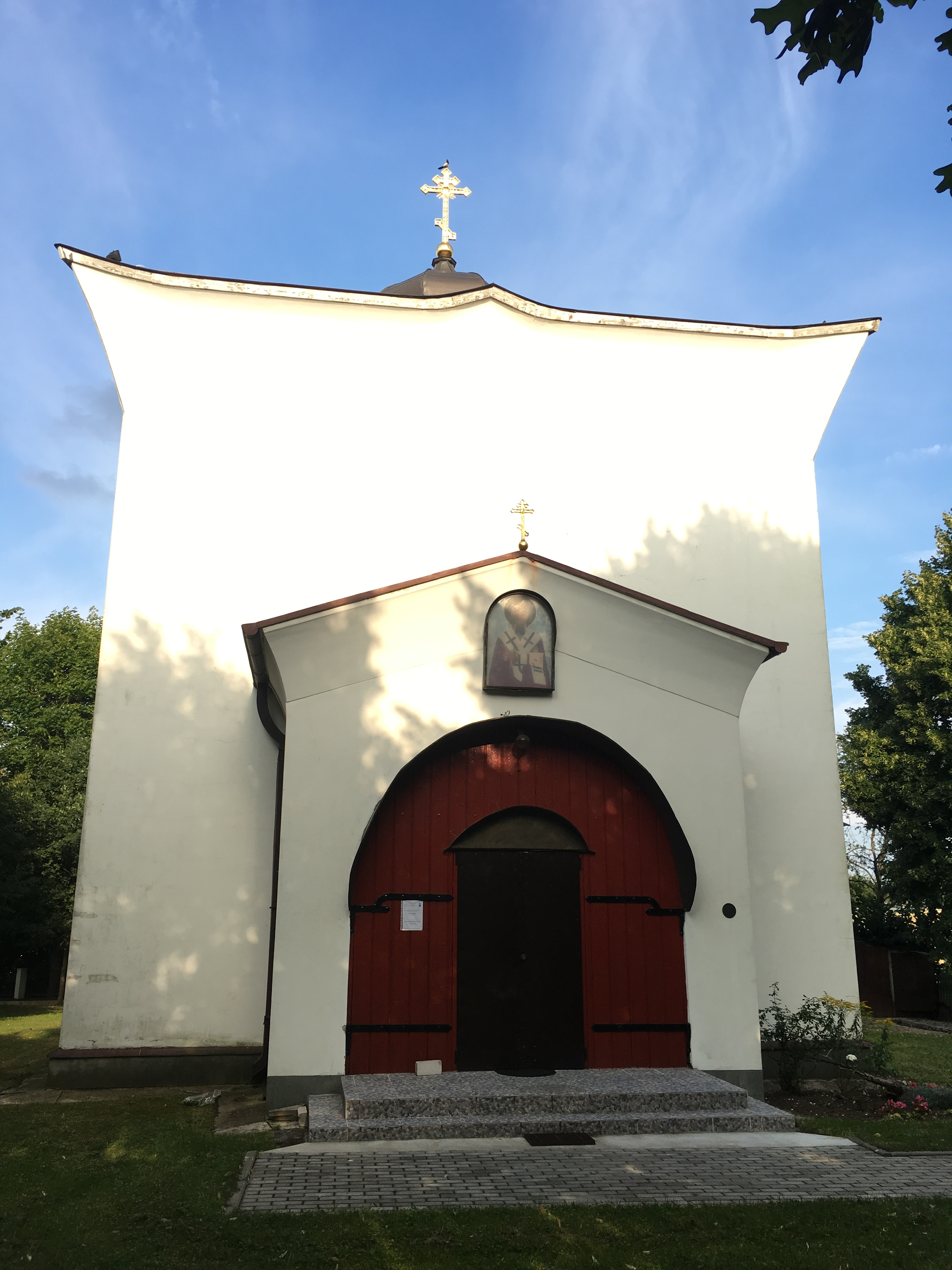
Orthodox church

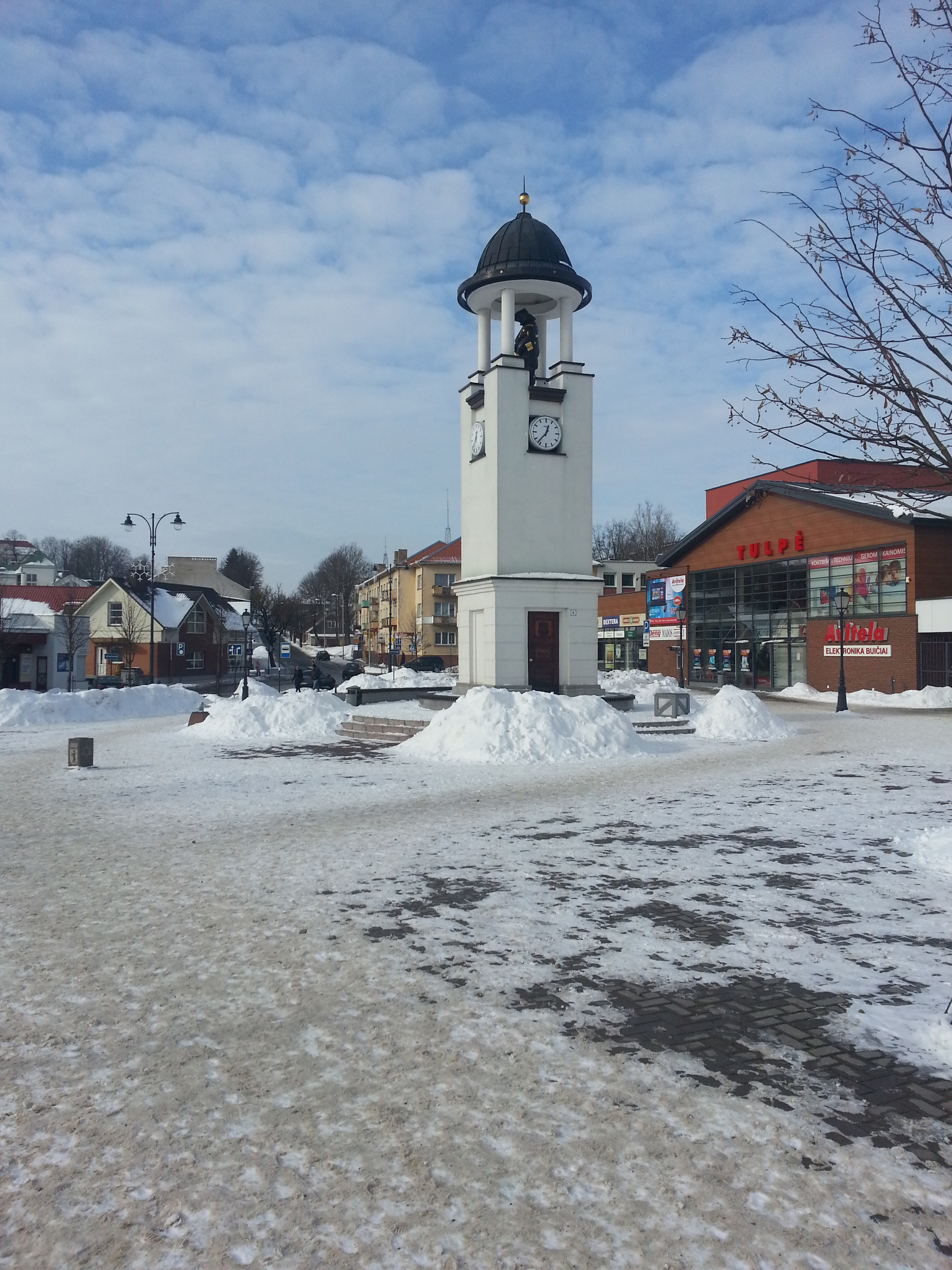
Telšiai clock-tower with a bear, the symbol of Samogitia

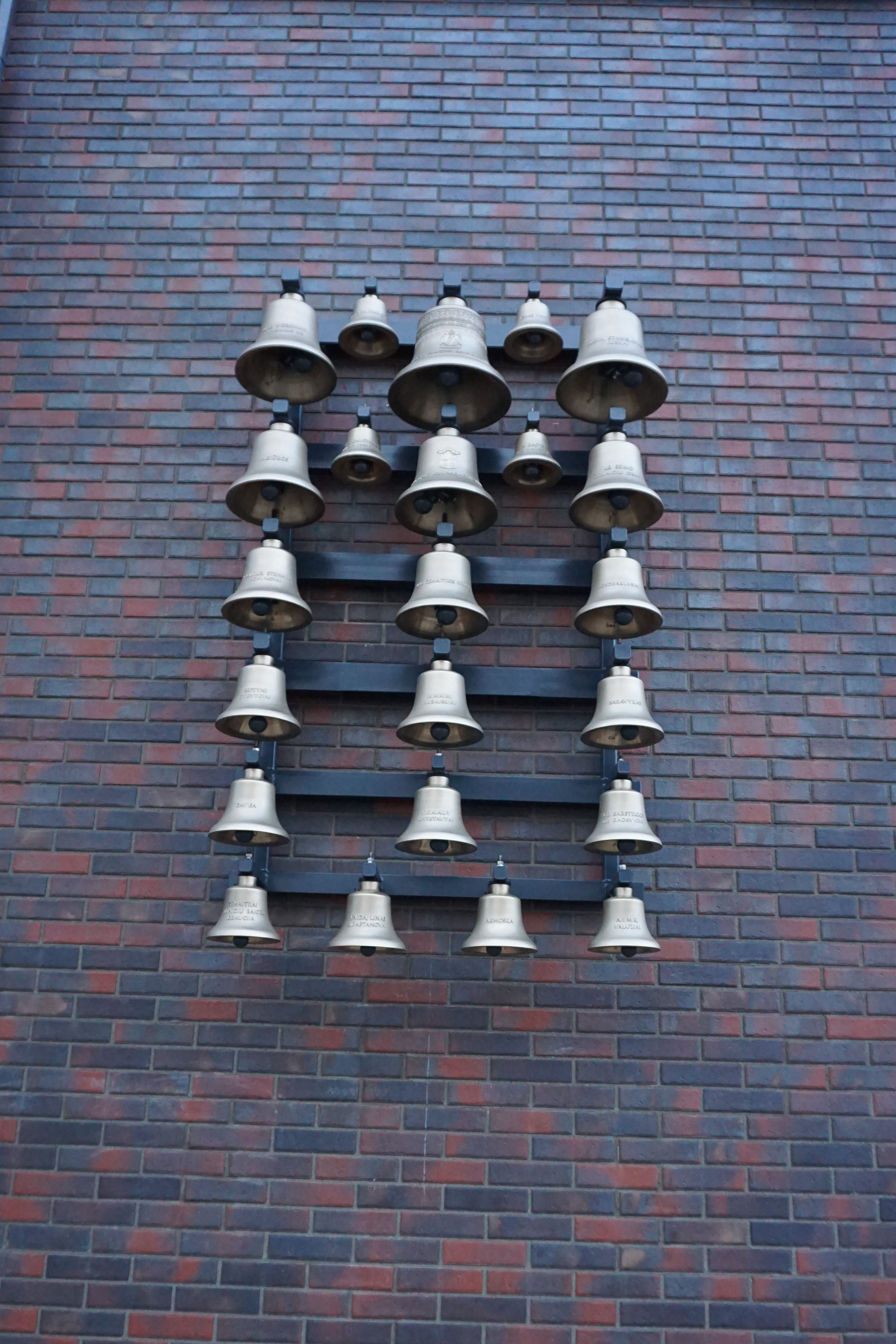
Carillon in Telsiai

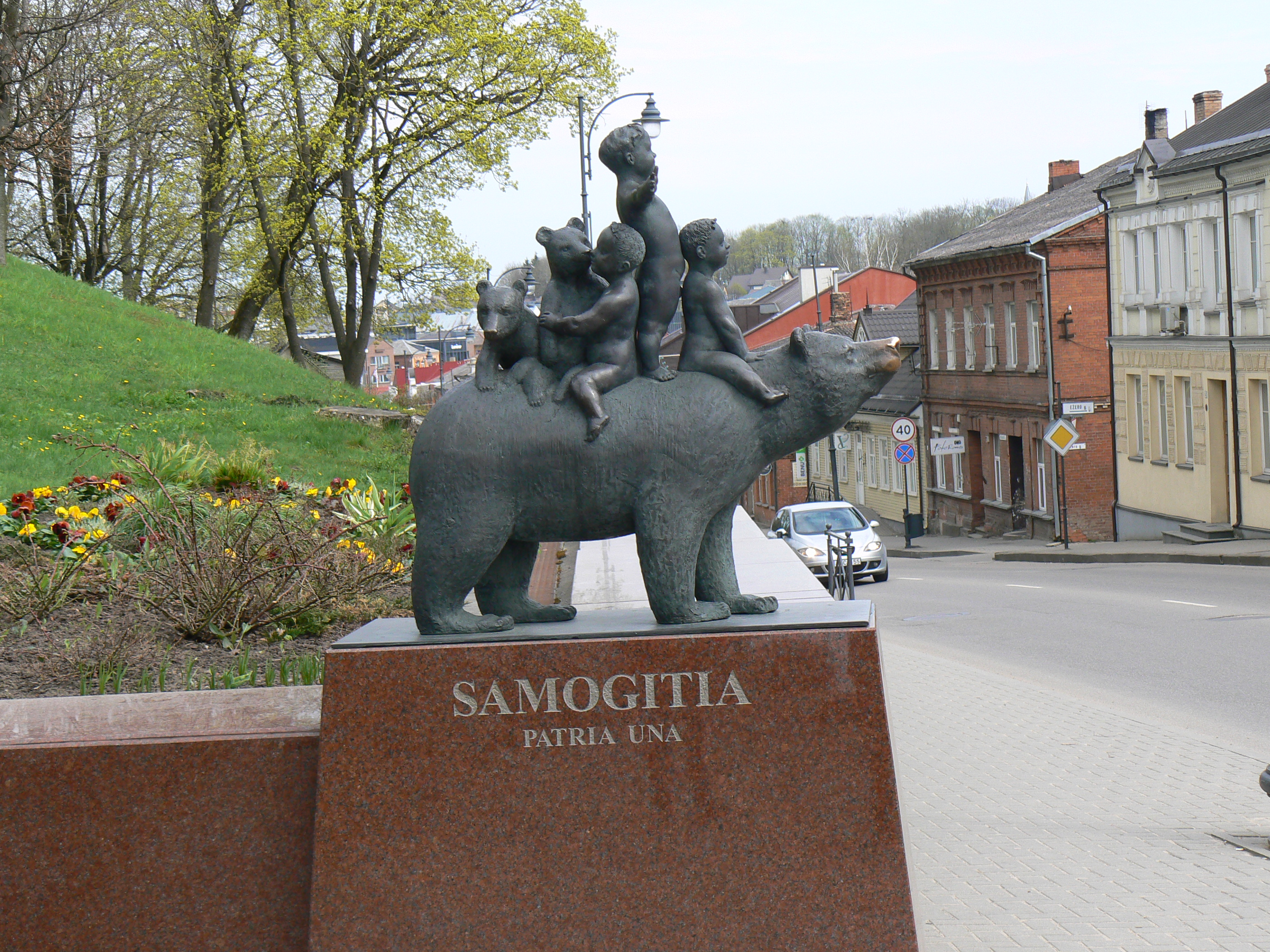
Samogitian bear sculpture

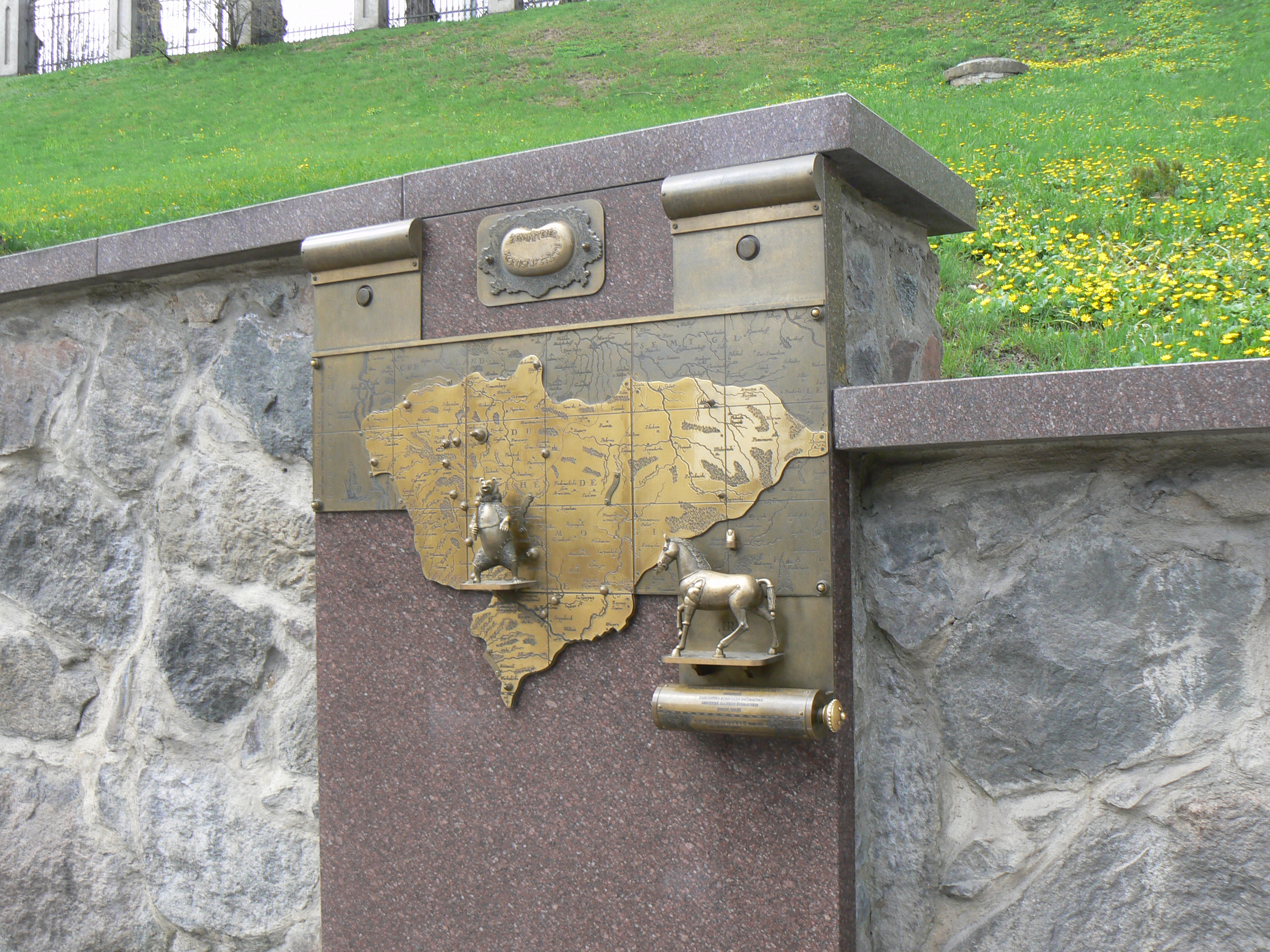
Respublikos street

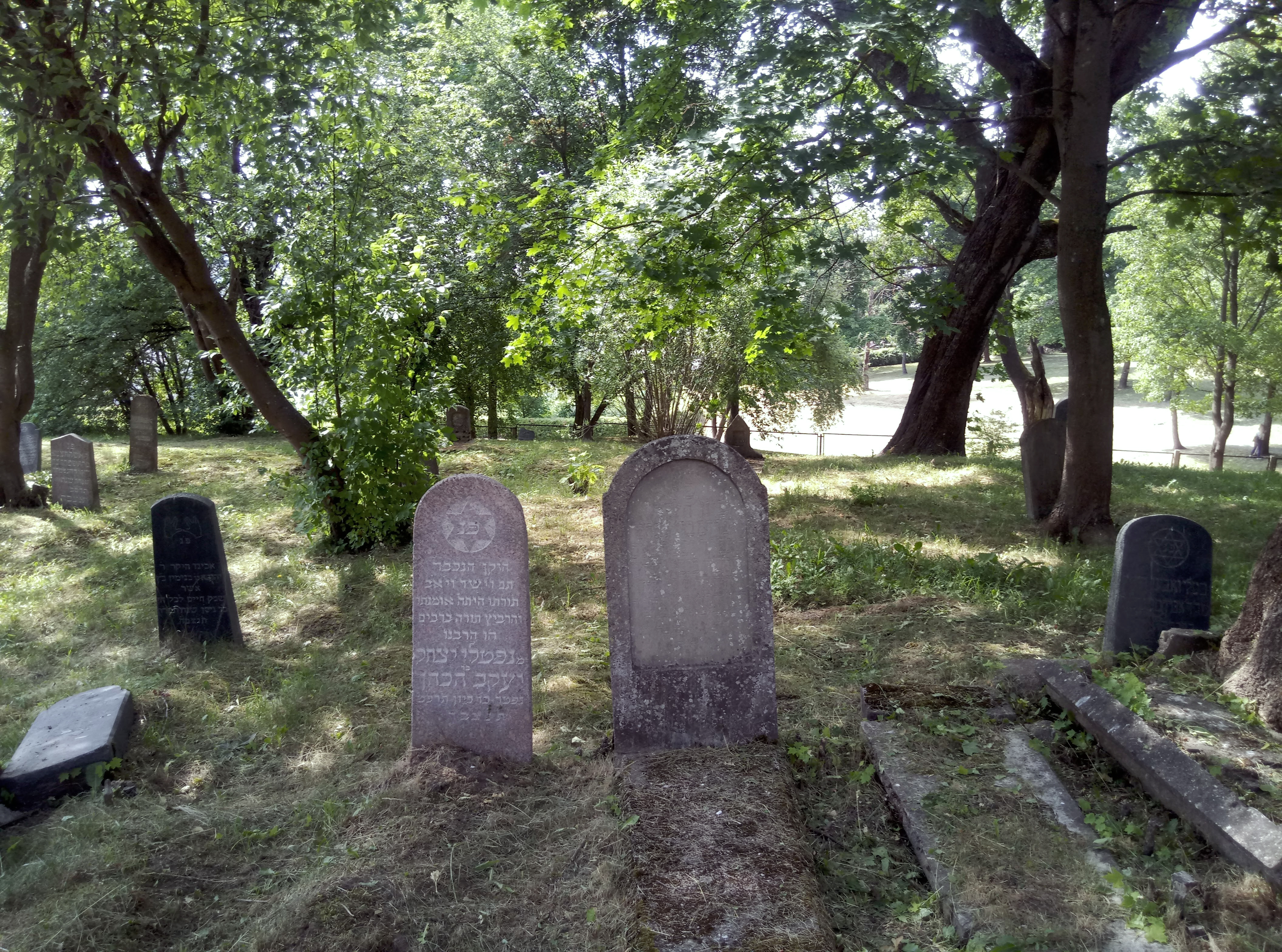
Jewish cemetery

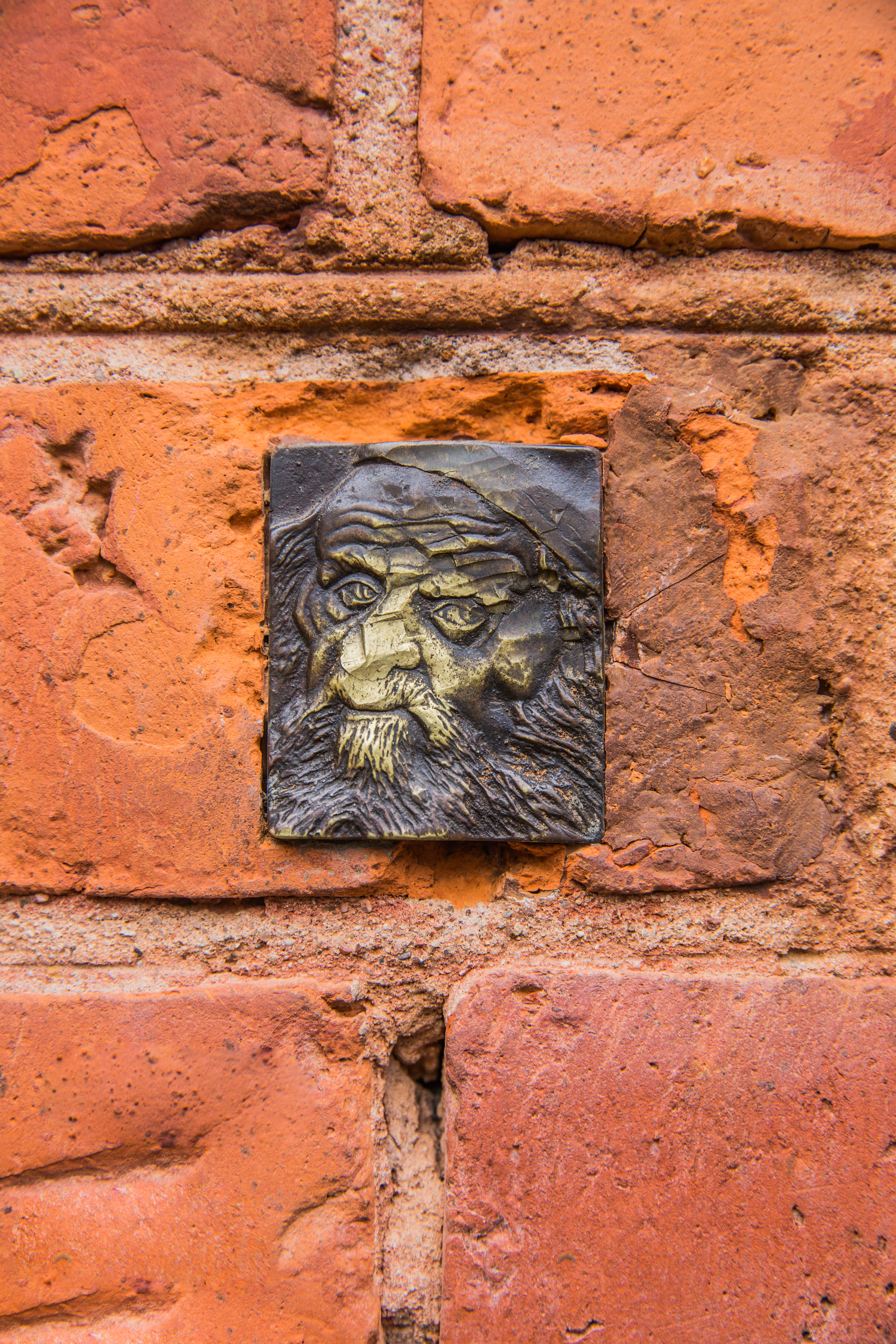
Telšiai Yeshiva Art

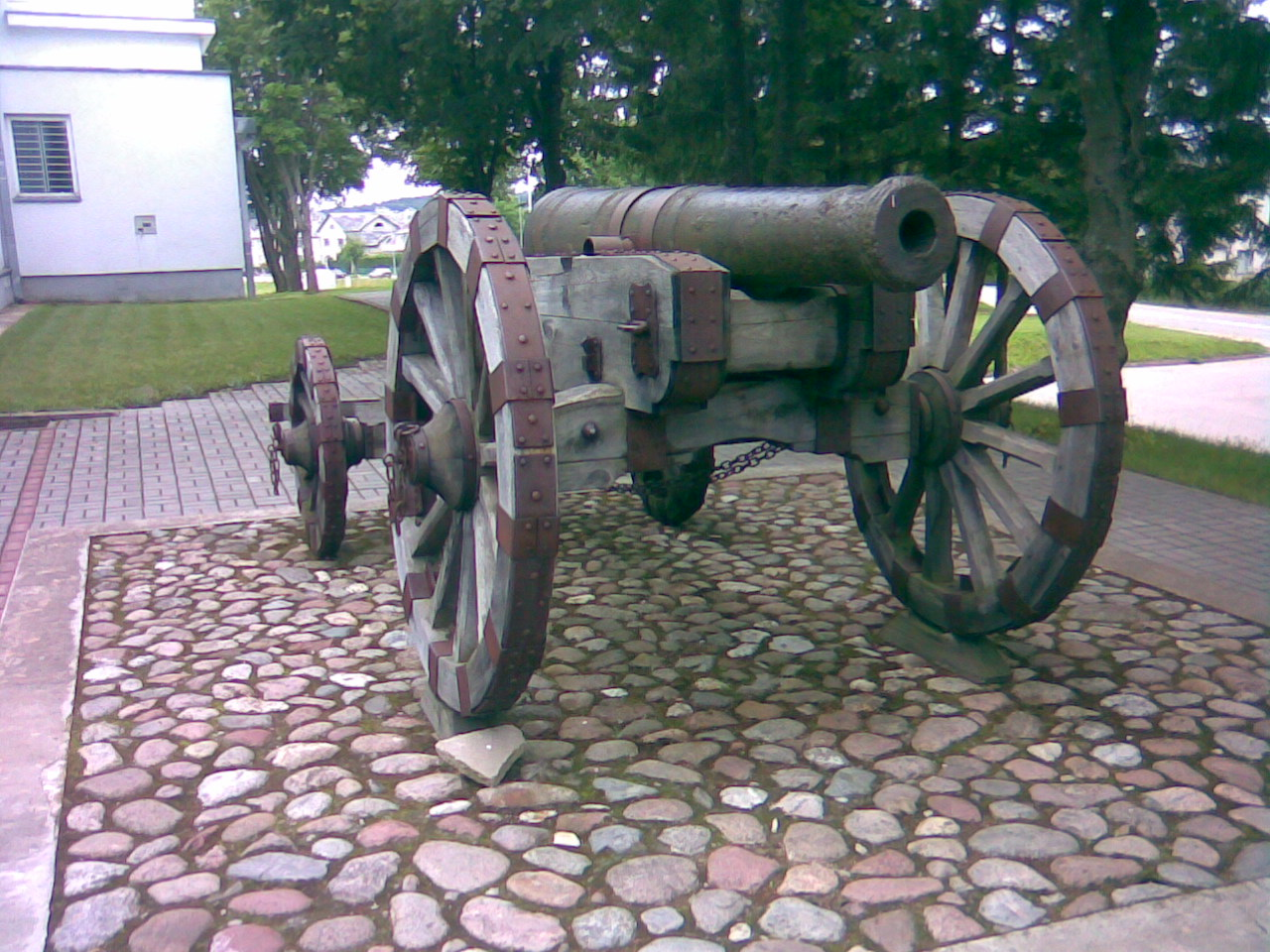
Cannon near the Alka Samogitian Museum

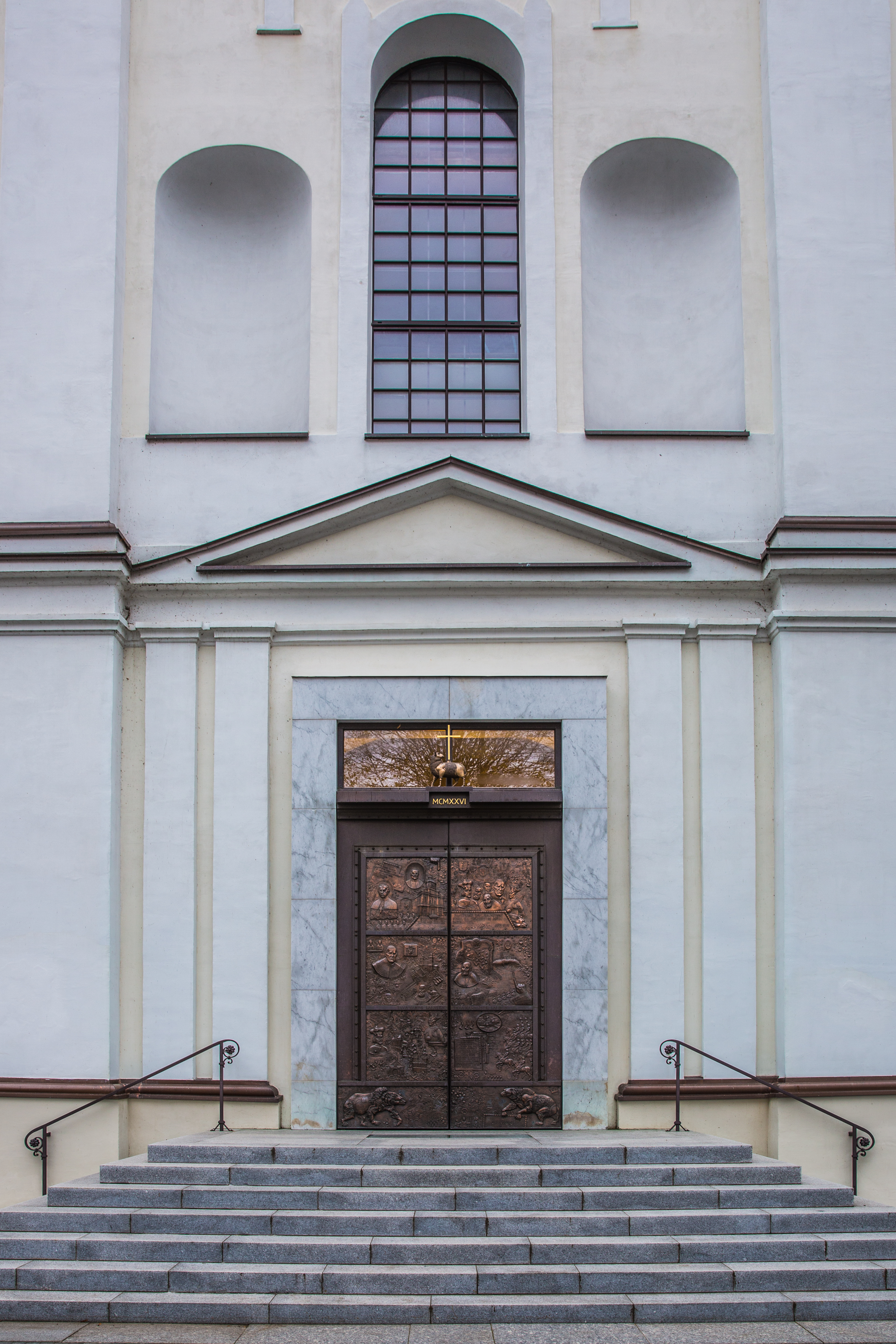
Doors of Telšiai Cathedral

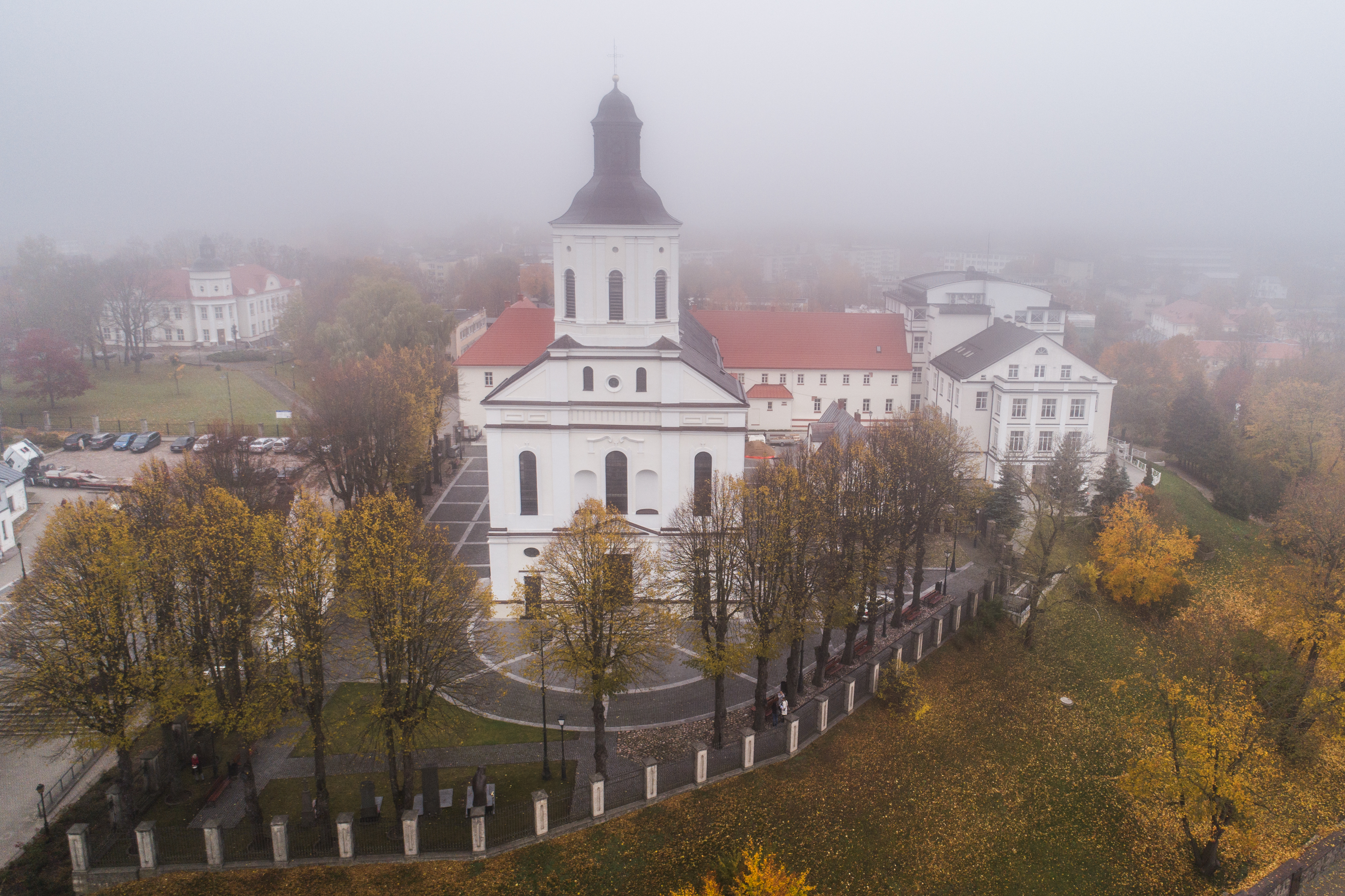
Bird's eye view

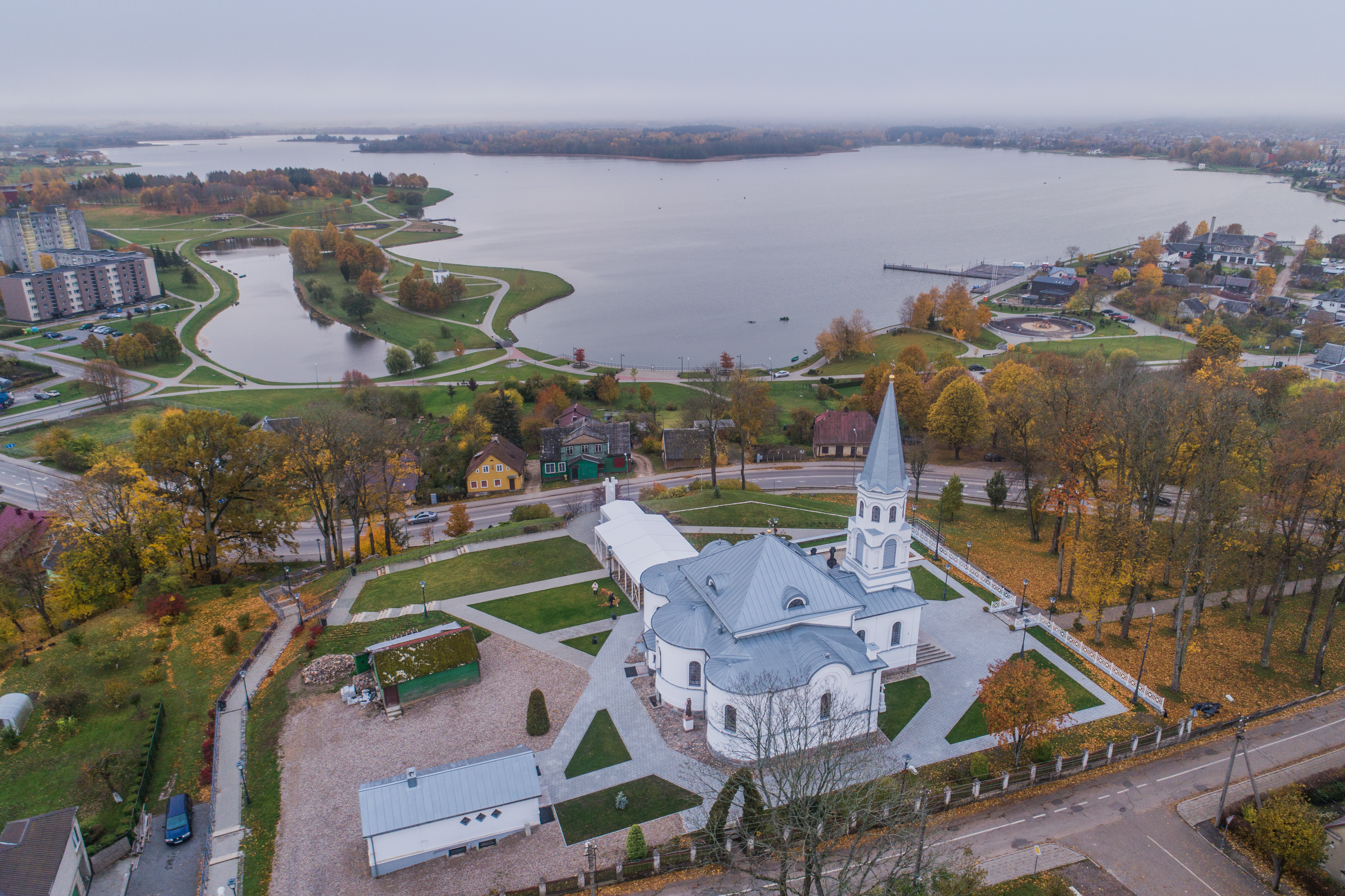
Mastis Lake

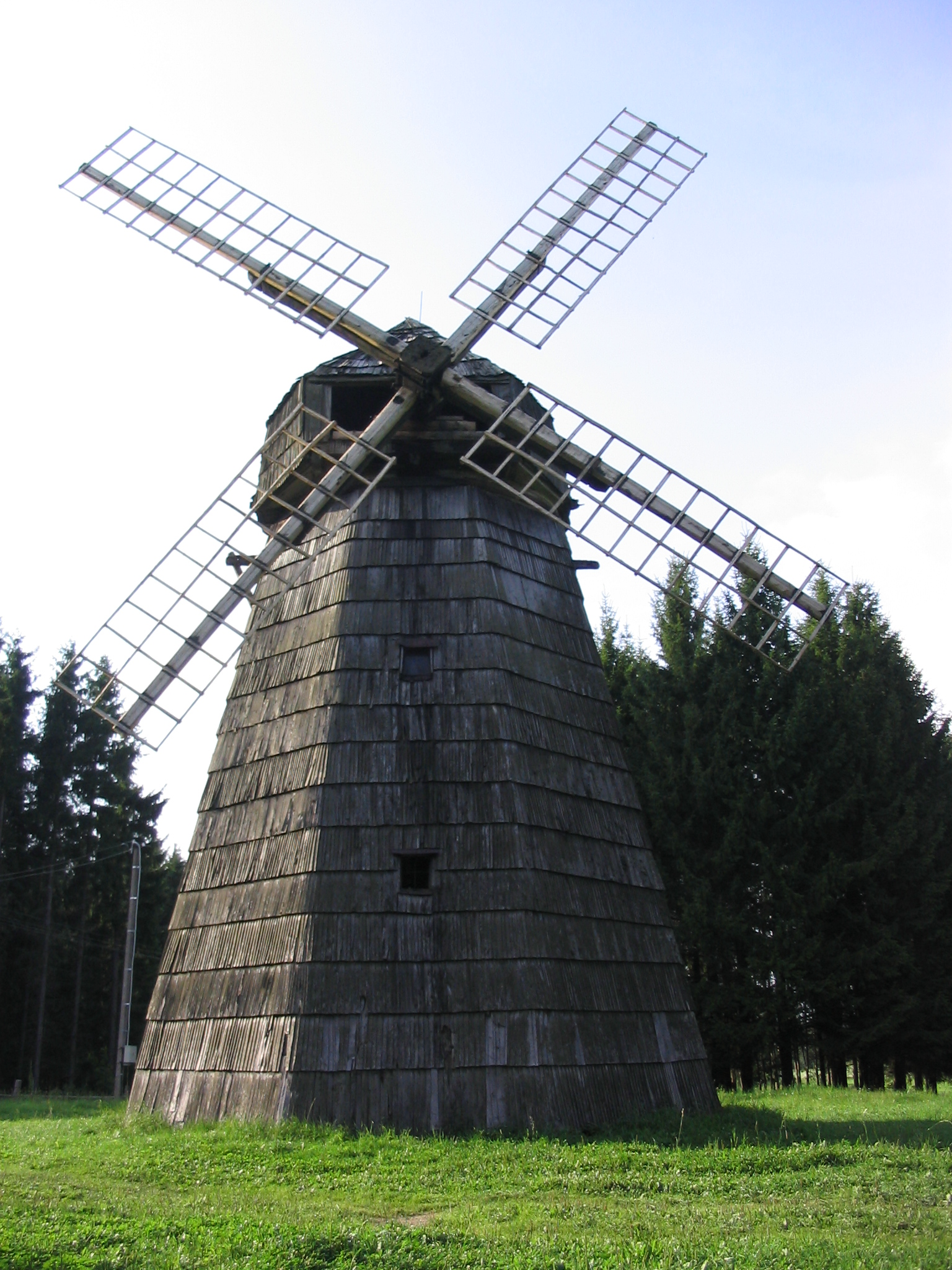
Windmill in the Museum of Rural Life of Samogitia

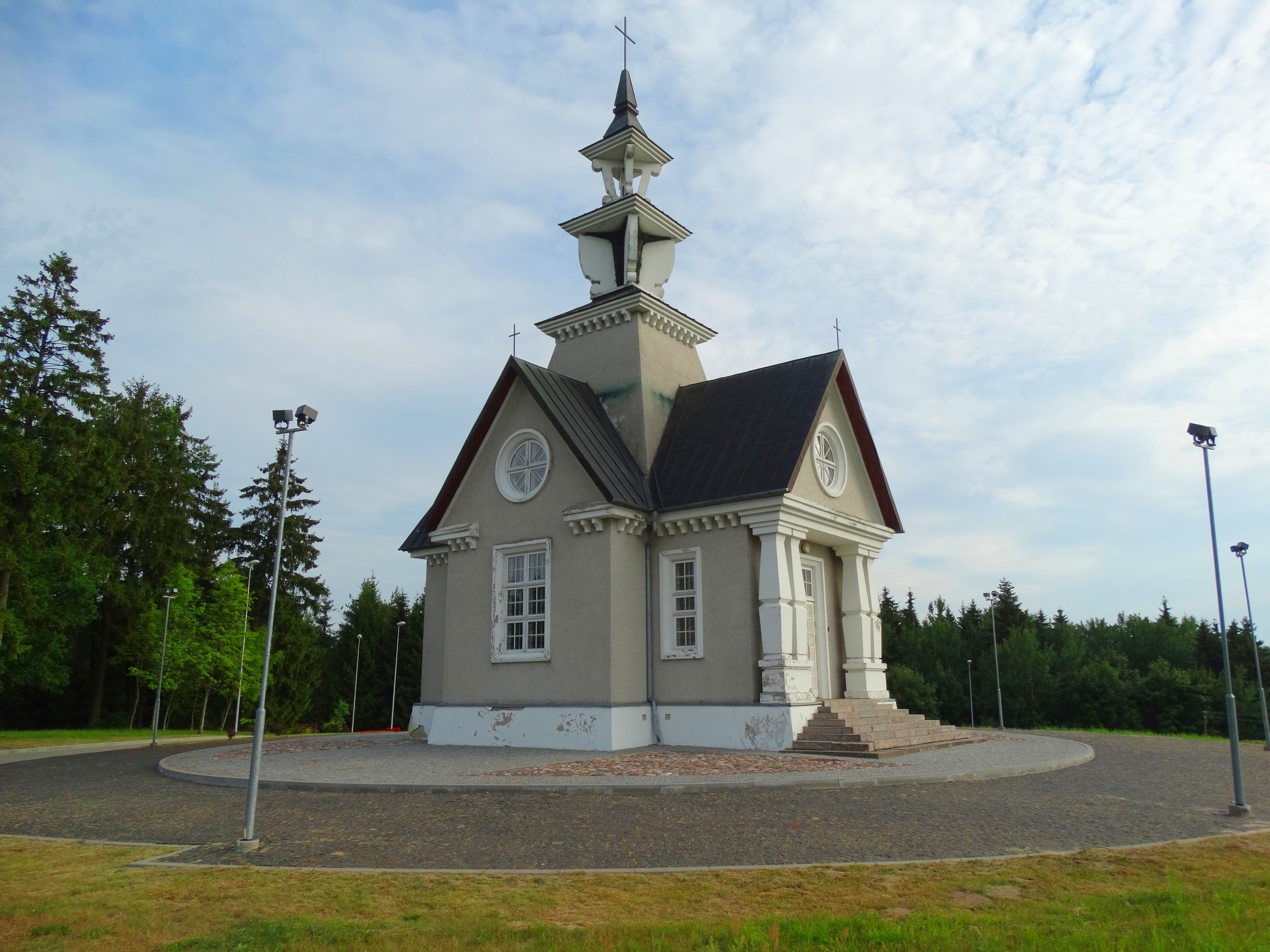
Chapel to commemorate Rainiai massacre carried out by Red Army

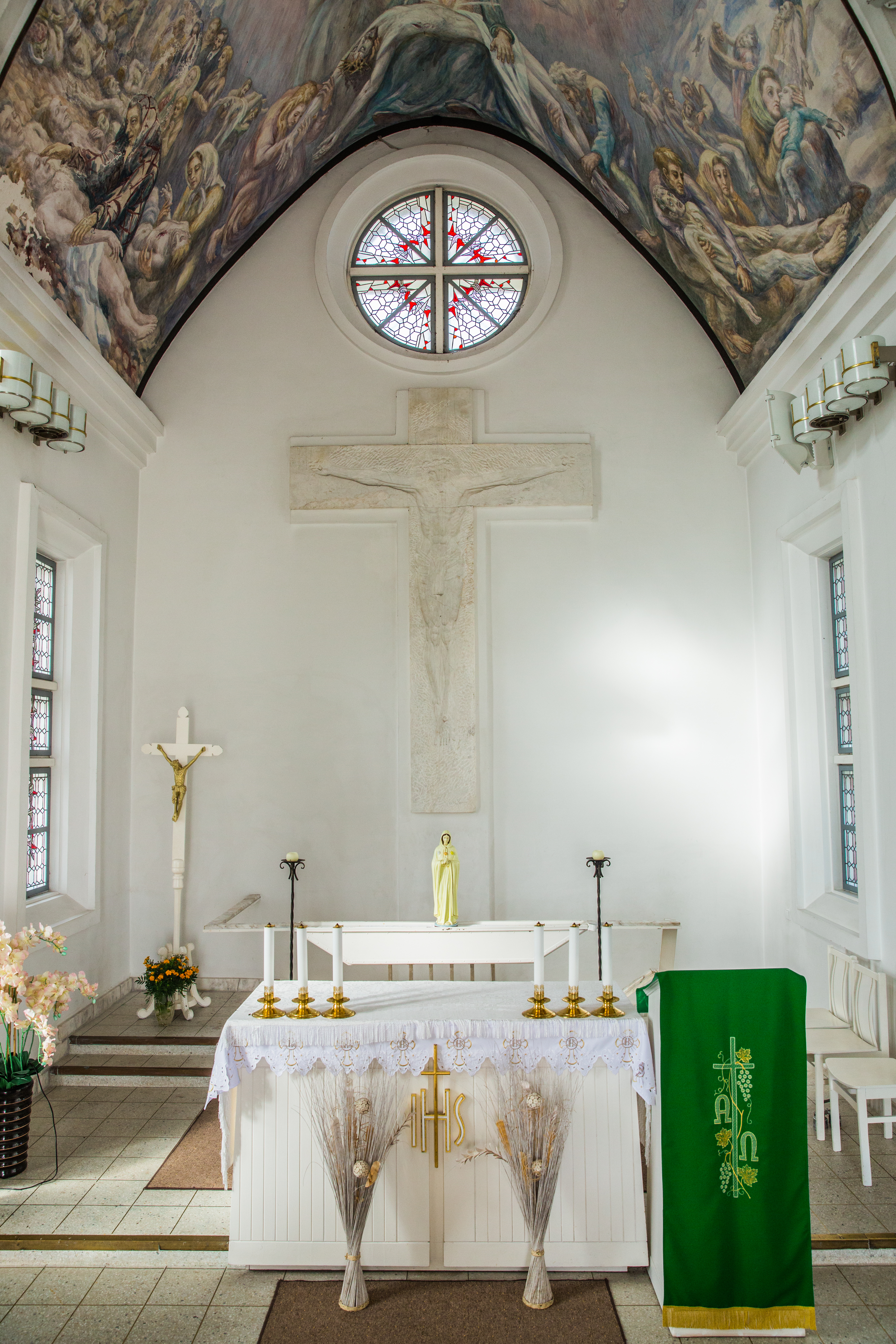
Rainiai chapel interior

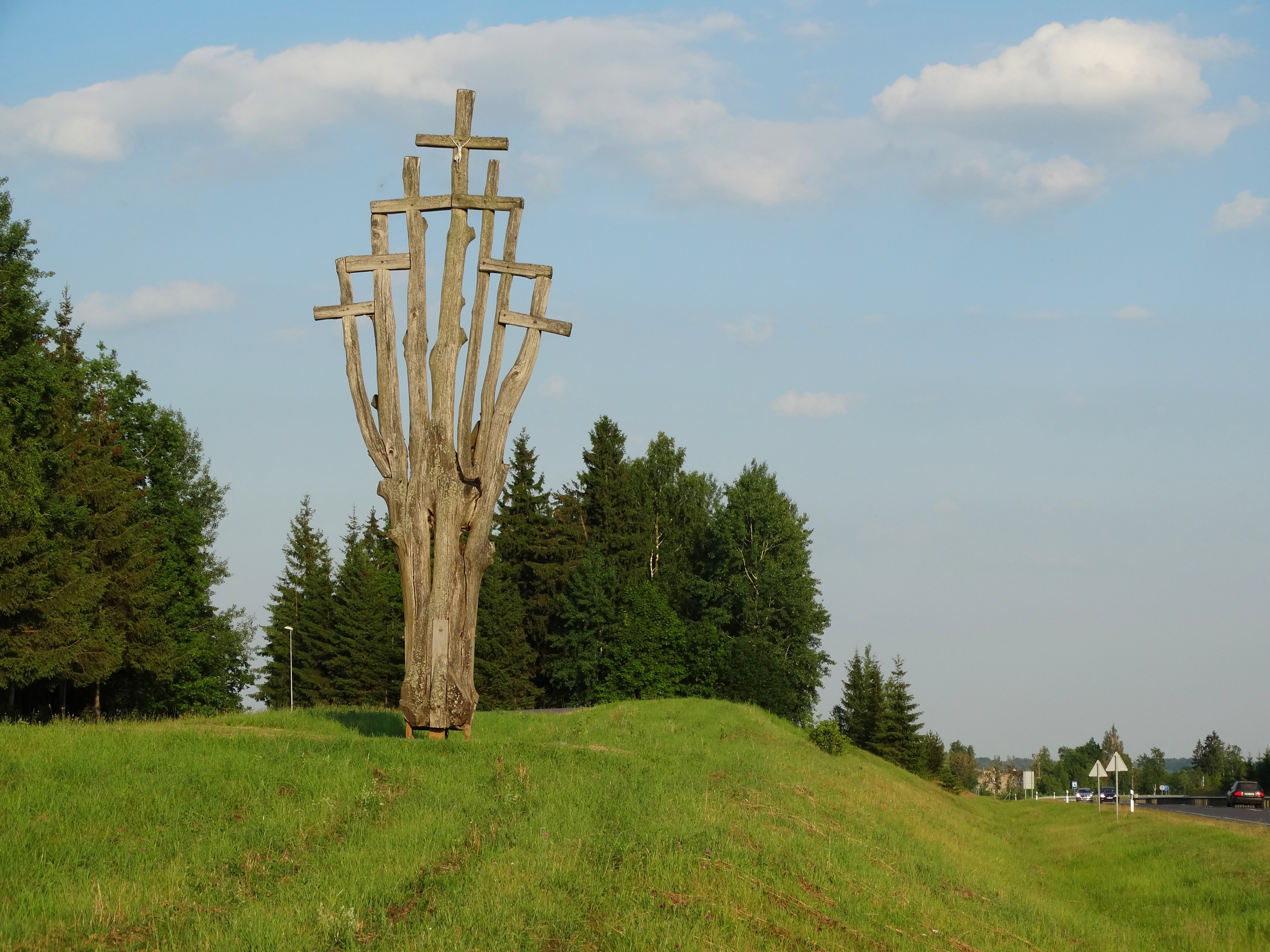
Rainiai tree of crosses

== See also ==
- Telšiai Bernardine monastery and seminary building complex
