= Justinas Staugaitis =

Lithuanian Roman Catholic bishop and politician (1866–1943)

- Bishop of Telšiai
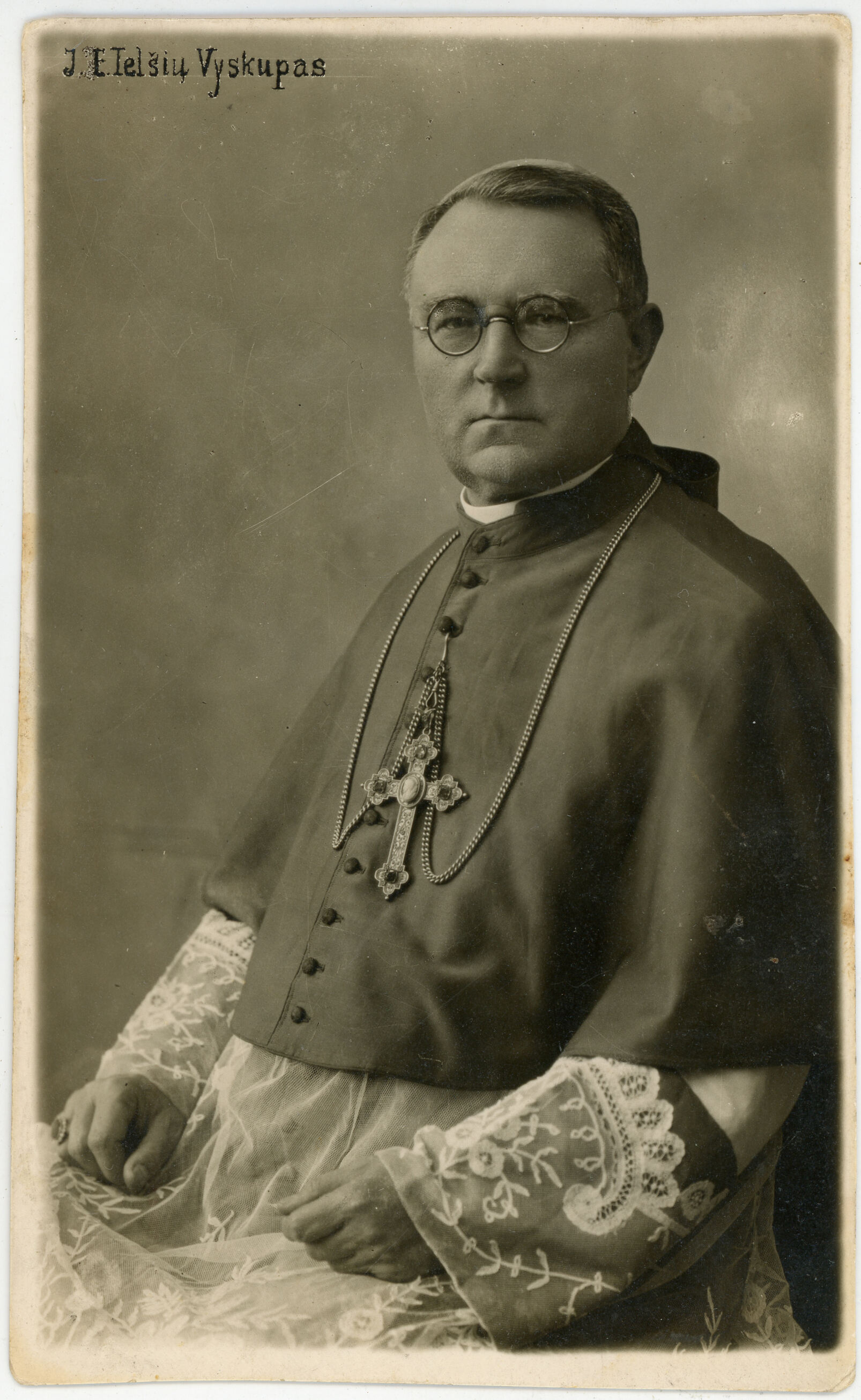
- Installed: 5 April 1926
- Term ended: 8 July 1943
- Predecessor: new diocese established
- Successor: Vincentas Borisevičius

Orders
- Ordination: 24 June 1890
- Consecration: 25 April 1926 by Antanas Karosas

Personal details
- Born: 14 November 1866 Tupikai, Suwałki Governorate, Congress Poland
- Died: 8 July 1943 (aged 76) Telšiai, Generalbezirk Litauen
- Buried: Telšiai Cathedral
- Denomination: Roman Catholic Church
- Education: Sejny Priest Seminary

Speaker of the Seimas
- In office 10 July 1923 – 27 January 1925
- Preceded by: Jonas Staugaitis
- Succeeded by: Leonas Bistras

Speaker of the Seimas
- In office 5 March 1926 – 2 June 1926
- Preceded by: Jonas Staugaitis
- Succeeded by: Jonas Staugaitis

Personal details
- Party: Lithuanian Christian Democratic Party
- Awards: Order of the Lithuanian Grand Duke Gediminas (1933)

Justinas Staugaitis (14 November 1866 – 8 July 1943) was a Lithuanian Roman Catholic politician and bishop. He was one of the twenty signatories to the Act of Independence of Lithuania and became the first bishop of Telšiai in 1926.

Educated at the Sejny Priest Seminary, Staugaitis was ordained as a priest in 1890. From 1894 to 1905, he served in the Archdiocese of Warsaw. Upon return to Lithuania, he was a pastor in Marijampolė, Lekėčiai, Pakuonis, and Aukštoji Panemunė (1916–1926). In Marijampolė, he became more involved in the Lithuanian cultural life – he founded and chaired Žiburys Society which established Lithuanian primary schools, participated in the agricultural Žagrė Society, and started contributing to the Lithuania press. He was the editor of the monthly Catholic magazine Vadovas from June 1909 to August 1912. During World War I, he remained in Lithuania and organized aid to war refugees.

In September 1917, Staugaitis was elected to the 20-member Council of Lithuania which adopted the Act of Independence of Lithuania on 16 February 1918. On that day, he was elected vice-chairman of the council and continued in this position until the council was replaced by the Constituent Assembly of Lithuania in May 1920. Staugaitis, as a member of the Lithuanian Christian Democratic Party and Farmers' Association, was elected to the Constituent Assembly, the First Seimas, and the Second Seimas where he served as a deputy speaker and speaker of the Seimas from July 1923 to January 1925 and from March to June 1926.

Staugaitis worked to establish the Lithuanian ecclesiastical province and became the first bishop of the newly formed Diocese of Telšiai and administrator of the Territorial Prelature of Klaipėda in April 1926. He established the Telšiai Priest Seminary, built bishop's residence and seminary's building, organized three eucharistic congresses. During the German occupation of Lithuania, Staugaitis pastoral letter which talked about helping those in need and avoiding revenge, but did not openly protest against the Holocaust in Lithuania and avoided getting involved in politics. He had a heart attack in 1939 and his health continued to decline. He died in July 1943 and was buried at Telšiai Cathedral.

== Biography ==
=== Early life and education ===
Staugaitis was born on 14 November [O.S. 2 November] 1866 in Tupikai in Congress Poland near the Russian–Prussian border. It is believed that the village was founded by his ancestors who migrated from East Prussia in the 17th century. His family were farmers who owned about 40 morgens of land. Staugaitis was the eldest of nine siblings, but four of them died in childhood. His brother Antanas Staugaitis was also a politician elected to the Seimas.

His father received illegal Lithuanian publications from priest Martynas Sederevičius. Staugaitis learned to read and write in Lithuanian at home from his parents, but later his parents hired a daraktorius (a teacher in clandestine Lithuanian schools) who was a dropout of the Warsaw Priest Seminary. The family delayed Staugaitis' official education due to financial difficulties. In 1877, he enrolled at the Russian primary school in Kudirkos Naumiestis located about 12 kilometres (7.5 mi) away. Because of the distance, he rented a room from distant relatives who spoke Polish. Staugaitis learned Polish from them.

In 1882, Staugaitis enrolled at the Marijampolė Gymnasium. At the time, he was already 14 years old, and the school did not admit children older than 12. Therefore, Staugaitis used the birth certificate of his first cousin once removed named Julijonas Staugaitis. At the gymnasium, his classmate was the future bishop Jurgis Matulaitis-Matulevičius. Staugaitis rented a room at a dormitory which was supervised by the future engineer and writer Antanas Vilkutaitis and jurist Antanas Kriščiukaitis. His roommates included the poet Motiejus Gustaitis. His teachers included Petras Kriaučiūnas who promoted the ideas of the Lithuanian National Revival and introduced his students to the first Lithuanian periodical Aušra which was illegal due to the Lithuanian press ban. Staugaitis earned a living by tutoring other students and by becoming a supervisor of a dormitory.

In July 1885, Staugaitis was one of 14 students (out of 46 candidates) admitted to the Sejny Priest Seminary. He did not have sufficient funds for the school, but received a scholarship under the last will of a priest in Keturvalakiai who was a distant relative. In his memoirs, Staugaitis criticized the seminary education as relatively low level, aimed at pastoral work with the congregation and not more academic theological studies. He also noted that the studies were based on old texts which did not equip the clerics with knowledge to combat the spread of socialist or freethought ideas. The seminary did not teach the Lithuanian language. Therefore, students organized a secret club (led by Tomas Žilinskas) to share the banned Lithuanian literature and improve their language skills.

=== Priesthood ===
Staugaitis was ordained on 24 June 1890 (the Nativity of John the Baptist). In September 1890, he was assigned as a vicar to Alytus which was a poor and neglected parish. He was reassigned to Śniadowo in February 1891. Intense pastoral work and poor living conditions had an impact on his health and he had chest pains. In spring 1893, he was reassigned to Balbieriškis where conditions were better. In November 1894, he read a manifesto about the death of Alexander III of Russia in Lithuanian, not Russian as required. He was questioned by the Tsarist police but avoided further persecution.

With an introduction of a local noble, Staugaitis applied for a position in the Archdiocese of Warsaw hoping that he could continue his education. In April 1895, he was posted as a vicar in Błędów. He was quickly reassigned to Łódź as a vicar and chaplain of a shelter for the elderly, and then to Warsaw as a vicar of the Church of St. Alexander for about three and a half years. He later worked as a chaplain at boys' gymnasiums. At the time, there were about 3,000 Lithuanians in the city, including two brothers of Staugaitis who studied trades with his financial assistance. A group of Lithuanians, including Staugaitis, wanted to establish a Lithuanian charitable society similar to the Warsaw Charitable Society but it was not approved by the governor.

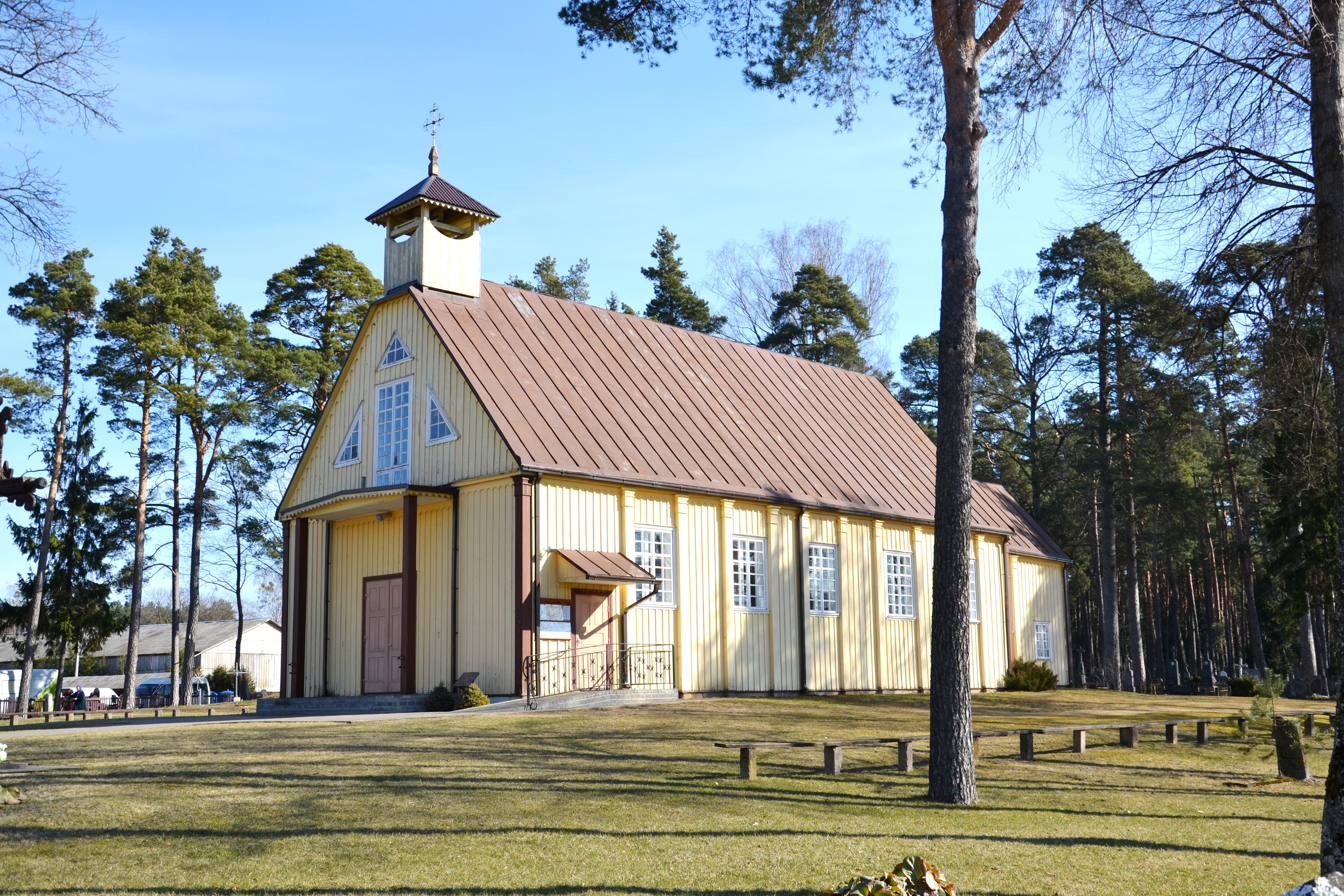
Church of St. Casimir in Lekėčiai built by Staugaitis

During the Russian Revolution of 1905, gymnasium students began a strike and the principal suspected that Staugaitis was involved. Therefore, Staugaitis accepted an offer to return to the Diocese of Sejny in August 1905. He was chosen as pastor of the proposed parish in Lekėčiai. While approval for the parish was pending with the Tsarist authorities, Staugaitis was temporarily posted as a vicar and vice-dean of Marijampolė. There he met other Lithuanian activists (Kazys Grinius, Motiejus Gustaitis, Petras Kriaučiūnas) and became involved in the Lithuanian cultural life.

The parish of Lekėčiai was approved in September 1906, exactly 60 years after it was first initiated. Staugaitis initiated the reconstruction of a chapel (built in 1843) into a parish Church of St. Casimir as well as the construction of a house and barn for the pastor. He felt underutilized in Lekėčiai and even considered moving to the United States. He left Lekėčiai in April 1909 to work on publishing Vadovas in Sejny. He returned to pastoral work in August 1912 when he became the pastor of Pakuonis. During World War I, he remained in Pakuonis and published an article in Vadovas urging other priests not to abandon their flock and not to retreat to Russia. In fall 1916, Staugaitis was reassigned to Aukštoji Panemunė near Kaunas where he continued to serve until his appointment as bishop in 1926.

=== Activism ===
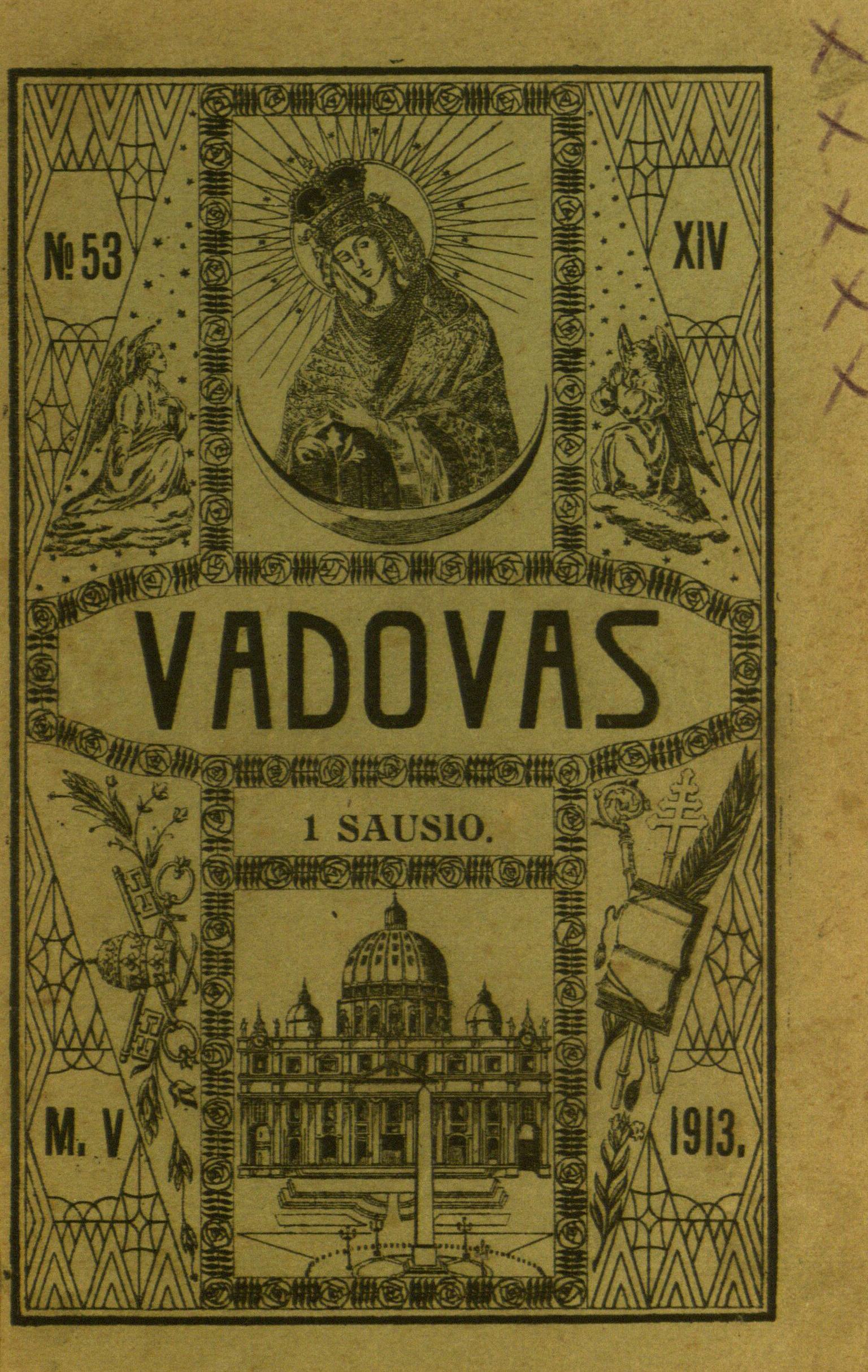
Cover page of January 1913 issue of Vadovas. It shows Our Lady of the Gate of Dawn (top) and St. Peter's Basilica (bottom).

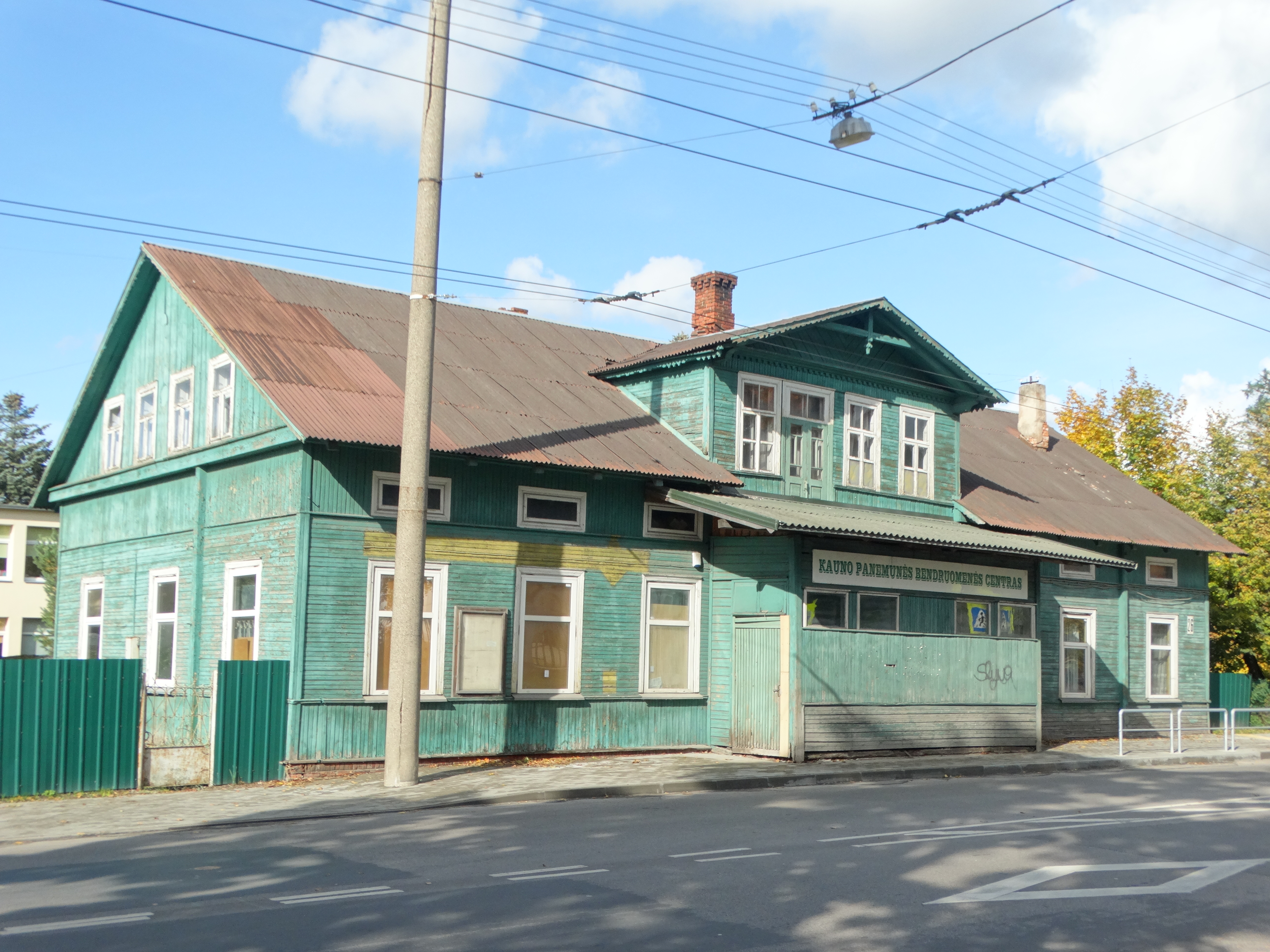
Parish community house in Aukštoji Panemunė where Staugaitis established a kindergarten

Staugaitis became one of the first in Lithuania to implement the principles of Catholic Action and the papal encyclicals Rerum novarum and Graves de communi re in practice. At the end of 1905, Staugaitis established a kindergarten for poor families in Marijampolė. It was twice rejected by the governor of Suwałki, but finally approved in September 1906. The kindergarten had about 60 children and utilized methods of Friedrich Fröbel, but it was a new concept in Lithuania and thus was received with skepticism by the public. Farmers complained that sending poor children to school meant losing their livestock herders.

Staugaitis organized Žiburys Society and was elected its chairman during its founding meeting on 6 January 1906. Staugaitis worked to organize Lithuanian primary schools in the Suwałki Governorate, a girls' progymnasium in Marijampolė, and an agricultural school (it was not accomplished). When he moved to Lekėčiai, Staugaitis could no longer chair the society, but continued to be involved in its leadership and organized local chapters in Lekėčiai and Pakuonys, and chaired the chapter in Sejny. Staugaitis officially resigned from Žiburys in May 1918. Staugaitis participated in the establishment of Žagrė Society, a cooperative that sold agricultural supplies and organized farmer education. In January 1909, Staugaitis presented on using parishes as basis for organizing charitable societies at three-day courses organized for Catholic activists in Kaunas.

Staugaitis assisted with the establishment of the weekly Catholic newspaper Šaltinis which published the first issue in March 1906. In 1908, priest Juozas Laukaitis established the monthly Catholic magazine Vadovas; Staugaitis became its editor in June 1909. It was aimed at the clergy; it published Lithuanian sermons, enforced consistent liturgy, engaged in polemics against atheist activists, reviewed new publications. Each issue had about 100 pages. Because it lacked collaborators, Staugaitis had to write about a third of the content himself. Due to health reasons, Staugaitis resigned from the magazine leaving it to Pranas Kuraitis in August 1912, but continued to indicated as the editor until August 1913. He returned to Vadovas in fall 1913 – spring 1914 while bishop Antanas Karosas and Kuraitis were on extended vacation in France.

During World War I, Staugaitis organized relief to the war refugees. He first worked with the Polish Central Citizens' Committee in Warsaw, but there were tensions between Polish and Lithuanian activists due to the alleged Polonisation attempts. Therefore, Staugaitis and other Lithuanian priests withdrew from the committee and obtained aid from the Lithuanian Society for the Relief of War Sufferers. In August 1916, Žiburys Society was reestablished which organized aid to refugees and continued its mission to organize Lithuanian schools. A primary school was opened in Pakuonis and a gymnasium in Marijampolė. Many primary schools were officially organized as kindergartens since they were not subject to German regulations.

=== Council of Lithuania ===
==== Proclaiming independence ====
As German military advances stalled in 1917, German leadership rethought their strategy for occupied Lithuania. The policy of open annexation was replaced by a more subtle strategy of creating a network of formally independent states under German influence (the so-called Mitteleuropa). To that end, Germans asked Lithuanians to establish an advisory council (Vertrauensrat). Staugaitis participated in several discussions of Lithuanian activists regarding such council. He attended Vilnius Conference in September 1917 and chaired its discussions on the political future of Lithuania. The conference elected the 20-member Council of Lithuania. Staugaitis received 155 votes for and 48 votes against, and became one of the four priests in the council.

In November 1917, Staugaitis traveled to Switzerland where, together with five other members of the Council of Lithuania, attended a conference with Swiss Lithuanians in Bern. On 10 December 1917, Staugaitis was one of six council members who attended a meeting with the German representative Kurt von Lersner during which the text of the Act of 11 December 1917 was agreed upon. This act proclaimed the independence of Lithuania but also called for "a firm and permanent alliance" with Germany. This caused a crisis within the council and four members left in protest. On 27 January 1918, Staugaitis offered a compromise – if Germans did not recognize Lithuania in three weeks, the council would denounce any alliances with Germany. Since no recognition came, the Act of Independence of Lithuania was signed on 16 February 1918. At the same time, the presidium of the council was reelected and Staugaitis became the second vice-chairman. However, he lived near Kaunas while the council was based in Vilnius which limited his ability to be present and involved in council's activities.

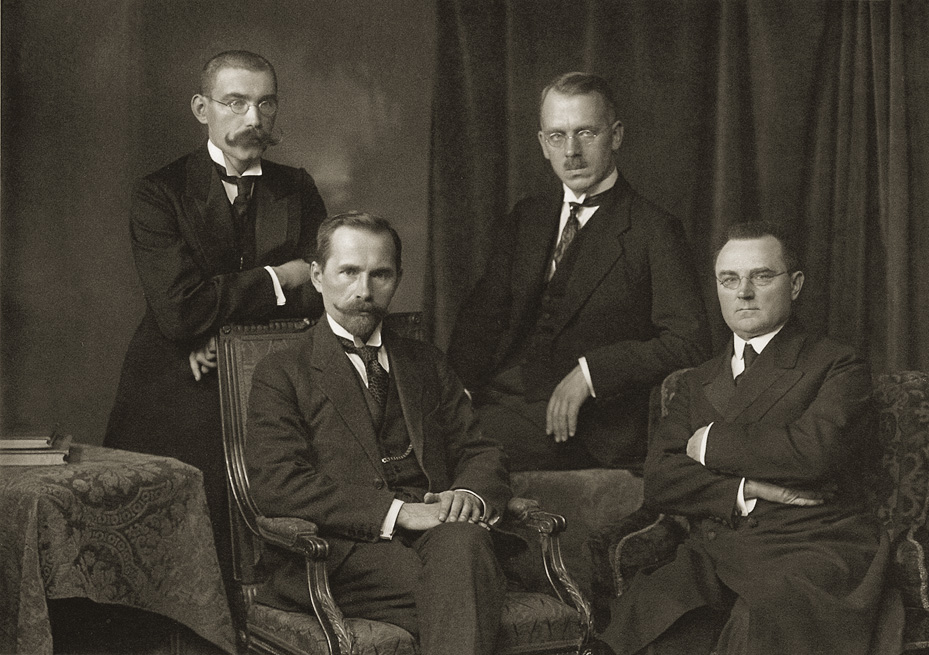
Presidium of the Council of Lithuania (Staugaitis sits on the right)

In March 1918, Staugaitis, Jurgis Šaulys, and Jonas Vileišis traveled to Berlin to obtain Germany's recognition of Lithuania's independence. They were met by chancellor Georg von Hertling who recognized Lithuania based on the Act of 11 December 1917. In July 1918, Staugaitis supported plans for the constitutional monarchy and voted to invite Wilhelm Karl, Duke of Urach, to become King of Lithuania. During 1918, Staugaitis traveled twice to meet with the papal nuncio Eugenio Pacelli (future Pope Pius XII) to discuss candidates for the bishop of Vilnius. Lithuanians promoted Konstantinas Olšauskas, but the Holy See chose Jurgis Matulaitis-Matulevičius in October 1918.

==== Forming Lithuanian government ====
In November 1918, as Germany was losing the war, the Council of Lithuania began organizing the first cabinet of ministers. The First Temporary Constitution was adopted on 2 November 1918. It envisioned the council's presidium (Antanas Smetona as chairman and Jurgis Šaulys and Staugaitis as vice-chairmen) as a collective president of Lithuania. The presidium appointed the prime minister Augustinas Voldemaras and his cabinet on 11 November 1918. However, at the outbreak of the Lithuanian–Soviet War, Smetona and Voldemaras left Lithuania causing a government crisis. Stasys Šilingas and Staugaitis became acting chairmen of the Council of Lithuania while Mykolas Sleževičius organized a new government.

Socialist Sleževičius feuded with the Council of Lithuania which was dominated by right-wing personalities. In the end, Sleževičius prevailed. The Second Temporary Constitution was adopted on 4 April 1919 which replaced the functions of the presidium of the Council of Lithuania with a single person, the President of Lithuania (Antanas Smetona). At the same time, presidium of the council was reelected and Staugaitis became its vice-chairman (he previously was second vice-chairman). However, the council effectively suspend its activity and did not hold another session until 15 October 1919, few days after the resignation of Sleževičius.

The Council of Lithuania decided to send two delegates, Staugaitis and Aleksandras Grigaitis, to the Paris Peace Conference to get updates from Augustinas Voldemaras, who led the Lithuanian delegation, and to the pope in hopes of establishing diplomatic relations with the Holy See. In Paris, Staugaitis established contacts with the British diplomat Esmé Howard, 1st Baron Howard of Penrith. In Rome, Staugaitis met with cardinal Pietro Gasparri and was granted a private audience with Pope Benedict XV in July 1919. While the pope seemed receptive to the Lithuanian cause, he indicated that recognition would come once Lithuania's borders became settled.

=== Seimas ===
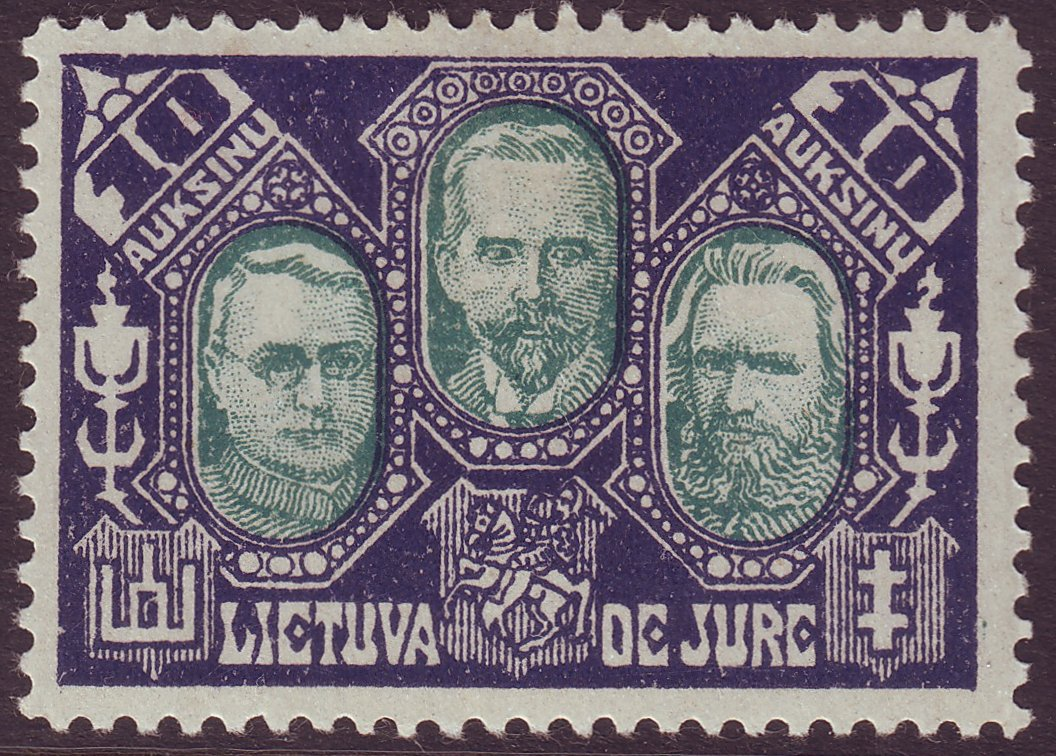
1922 postage stamp with portraits of Justinas Staugaitis, Antanas Smetona, and Stasys Šilingas

As a candidate of the Lithuanian Christian Democratic Party, Staugaitis was elected to the Constituent Assembly of Lithuania in the April 1920 election. Staugaitis was its second deputy speaker. In October 1920, the assembly sent a four-member delegation (Staugaitis, Mykolas Sleževičius, Vincas Čepinskis, and Maksas Soloveičikas) to London, Paris, and Rome in hopes of obtaining de jure recognition for Lithuania and discussing Lithuanian claims to Vilnius Region in light of the Żeligowski's Mutiny. In December 1921, he chaired a parliamentary delegation to the Parliament of Finland.

Staugaits was reelected to the First and Second Seimas on the electoral list of the Farmers' Association. As the oldest member of the First Seimas, Staugaitis became its acting speaker for a week until the parliament elected its presidium. Staugaitis was elected the first deputy speaker (second deputy speaker from 23 January 1923 until the dissolution of the Seimas in June 1923). In the Second Seimas, he was the speaker from 10 July 1923 to 27 January 1925, and again from 5 March 1926 to the end of the term on 2 June 1926 (he was supposed to resign after becoming bishop but the Seimas was not in session at the time and his resignation letter was not found in archives). In between the speakerships, he served as the first deputy speaker. As the speaker of the parliament, Staugaitis was acting president in February–May 1924 and December 1924 – January 1925 while president Aleksandras Stulginskis was abroad.

In the Seimas, Staugaitis was a known as a good speaker. He frequently prepared lengthy speeches, but could also improvise and make a sharp retort. His participation in sessions decreased as years went on. In the Constituent Assembly, he spoke frequently on issues of education, land reform, foreign policy, and particularly the 1922 Constitution (he was a member of the constitutional working committee). In the First Seimas, he mainly worked on the statute of the Seimas (it was not completed). In the Second Seimas, he did not participate in floor discussions, but delivered a few prepared speeches. Overall, Staugaitis was rather flexible politician seeking compromise and consensus. According to memoirs of Zigmas Toliušis, Staugaitis was the strictest speaker of the Seimas keeping order and enforcing rules.

Although Staugaitis was known as one of the leaders and ideologues of Christian Democrats, he did not have leadership positions in either the Christian Democratic Party or the Farmers' Association.

=== Bishop ===
==== Appointment ====
On 25 October 1922, Pope Pius XI named Antonino Zecchini Apostolic Delegate to Lithuania, Latvia, and Estonia with residence in Kaunas. Zecchini arrived to Lithuania in April 1923 and lived with Staugaitis in the parish of Aukštoji Panemunė for about six months. Staugaitis became a canon of Sejny in 1922 and a prelate in July 1924.

As negotiations between the Holy See and Poland on their concordat progressed, Lithuanian diplomats objected to the plans of subordinating the Diocese of Vilnius to the Polish ecclesiastical province. In December 1924, Staugaitis led a special Lithuanian delegation (Stasys Šalkauskis, Juozas Purickis, and Juozapas Kukta) hoping to appeal to the pope directly, but was received only by Pietro Gasparri, the Cardinal Secretary of State, who openly rejected Lithuanian demands stating that "the Church does not care about state borders". When the concordat with Poland was concluded in February 1925, the Diocese of Vilnius became one of the five archdioceses of the Polish ecclesiastical province and Lithuanians interpreted it as papal recognition of the Polish claims to the contested Vilnius Region. Lithuanian protests resulted in the formal termination of the Holy See–Lithuania relations.

Staugaitis was one of the few Lithuanian politicians who attempted to defend Vatican's position. In October 1925, in an attempt to normalize the diplomatic relations, Staugaitis initiated a meeting of Lithuanian bishops and the apostolic chargés d'affaires ad interim Luigi Faidutti to prepare an initial project for the reorganization of the Lithuanian ecclesiastical province. Jurgis Matulaitis-Matulevičius, who became an apostolic visitor, handled further negotiations. The papal bull Lithuanorum Gente issued on 4 April 1926 established the Archdiocese of Kaunas with four dioceses; the next day, Staugaitis was selected as the first bishop of the new Diocese of Telšiai. At the same time, he became the administrator of the Territorial Prelature of Klaipėda, established for the small number of Catholics in the Klaipėda Region. Staugaitis was rumored to be short-listed for the archbishop of Kaunas, but according to the historian Algimantas Kasparavičius, he was too deeply involved in politics.

Staugaitis wrote in his memoirs that he had reservations about becoming bishop as Telšiai was in Samogitia, area of Lithuania that had not visited before. He was consecrated on 25 April 1926 in Kaunas Cathedral by bishop Antanas Karosas with assistance from Juozapas Skvireckas and Pranciškus Karevičius. Priest Vincentas Borisevičius became Staugaitis' secretary. In July 1926, Staugaitis was promoted to papal domestic prelate.

==== Pastoral work ====
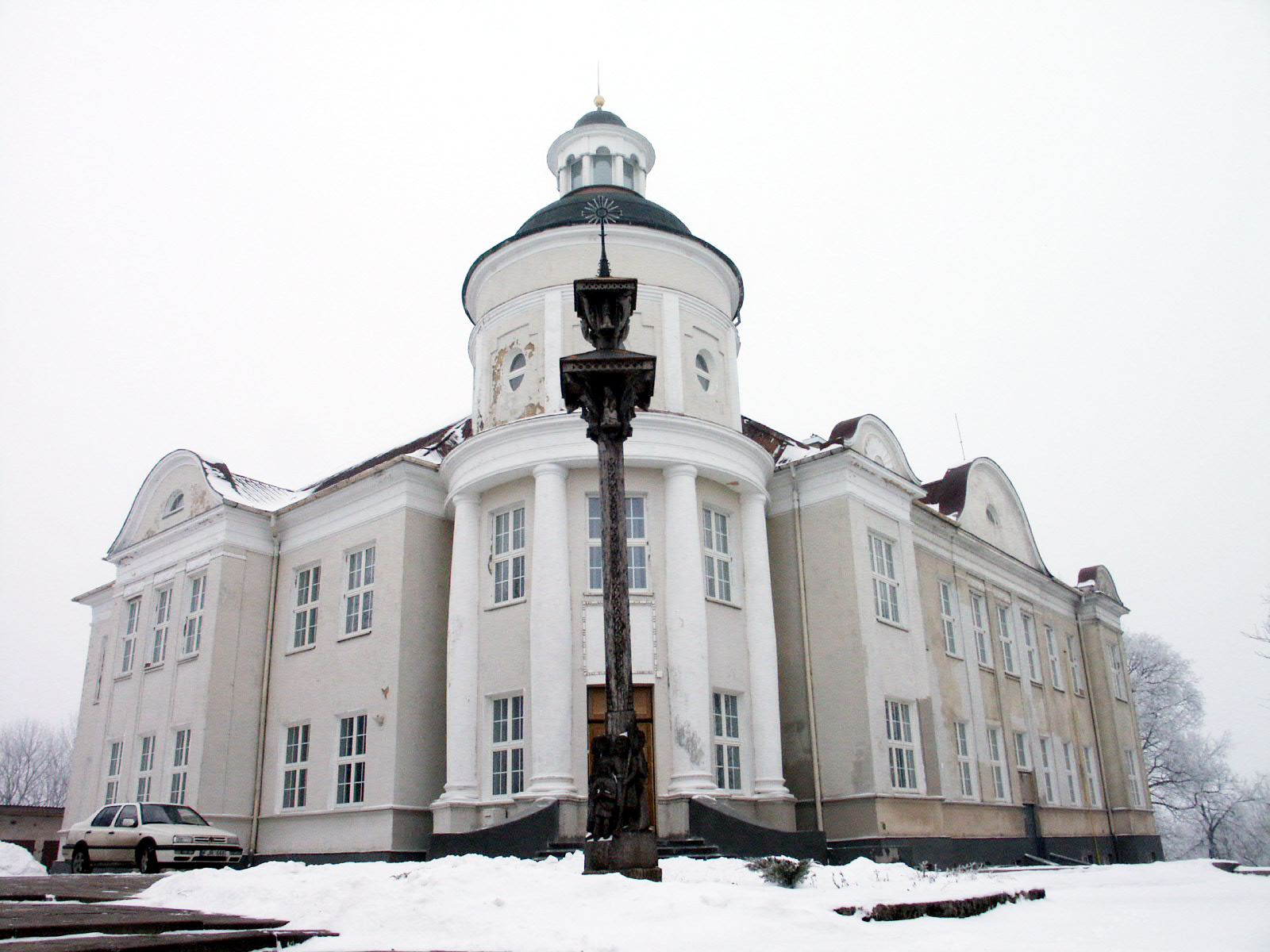
Bishop's residence built by Staugaitis in Telšiai in 1930

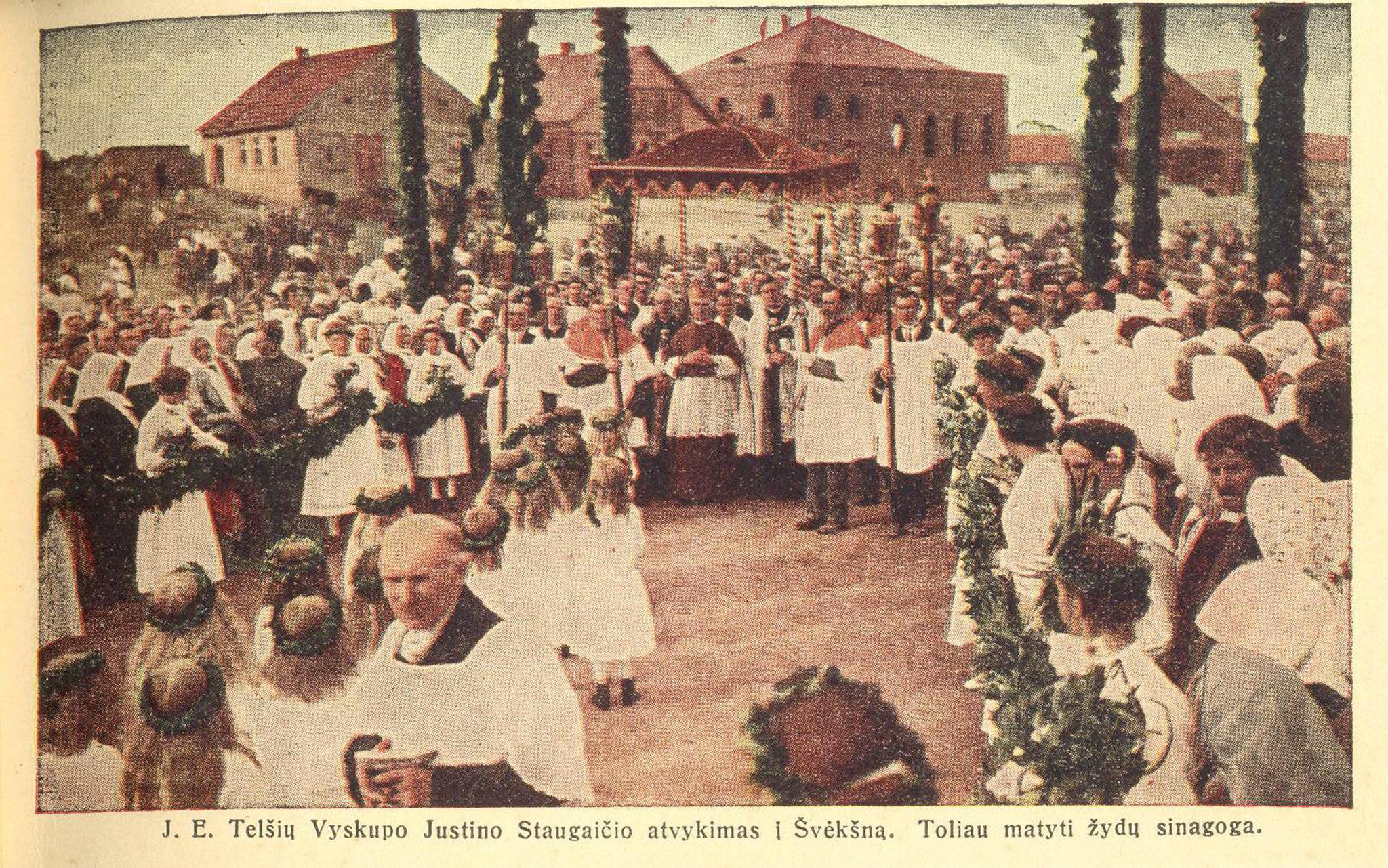
Staugaitis enters Švėkšna on 25 July 1928 to bless the new building of the gymnasium of Saulė Society

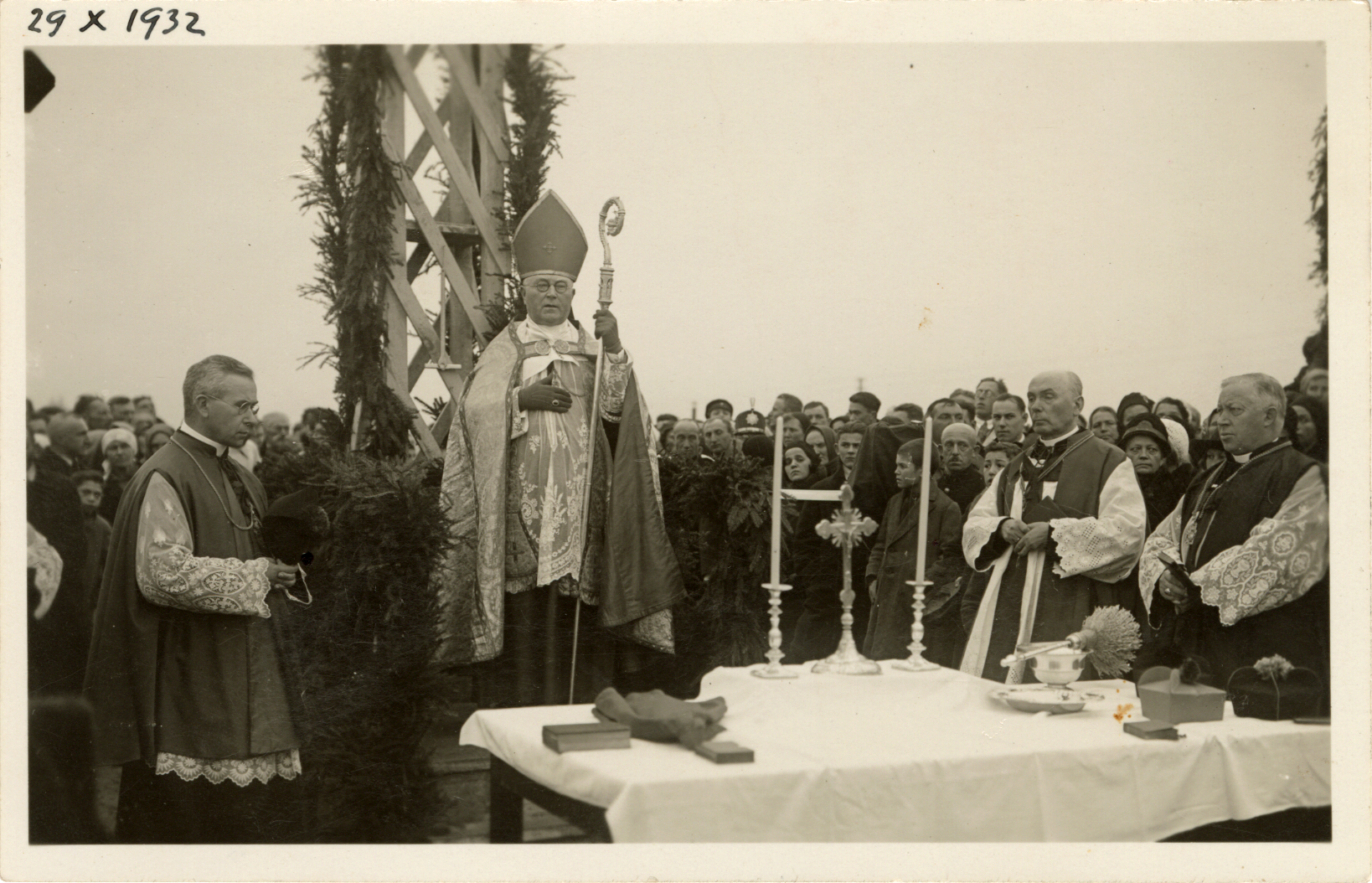
Staugaitis blesses the new railway line Telšiai–Kretinga in 1932

The beginning of Staugaitis' work in the new diocese was difficult as there was a lack of priests experienced in administration and the government of Mykolas Sleževičius refused to recognize the diocese or pay salaries to its employees. Staugaitis had to establish a diocesan chancery and invited several of his colleagues from Suvalkija thus sidelining and causing some tensions with local Samogitian priests. Staugaitis also built diocese's headquarters (bishop's residence, curia, consistory court, and archive). Designed by architects Povilas Taračkovas and Vladimiras Dubeneckis, the building has features of Baroque Revival and was completed in 1930.

Staugaitis supported the weekly Žemaičių prietelius and made it the diocesan newspaper. In 1928, the diocese purchased a printing shop in Telšiai and took over the printing of the newspaper. During Staugaitis' tenure, the diocese organized three eucharistic congresses: 1931 in Telšiai, 1933 (jubilee year) in Švėkšna, and 1936 in Kretinga. In June 1939, a special three-day eucharistic congress for men took place in Telšiai. It was attended by about 30,000 people. The first diocesan synod was held in April 1935. Staugaitis also organized annual spiritual exercises and deanery conferences during which priests had to present papers on current events. As bishop, he published 34 pastoral letters. He supported and encouraged various Catholic organizations (e.g. Catholic youth association Pavasaris). In particular, he urged all parish priests to establish a chapter of the Motiejus Valančius People's University (a folk high school). To support the societies, the diocese organized several courses for chapters' leaders.

Relations with the Territorial Prelature of Klaipėda were complex as Klaipėda Region, part of East Prussia prior to 1919, was mostly Lutheran and under great German influence. Staugaitis supported Lithuanization efforts, including the construction of a new Catholic church in Klaipėda to serve the growing Catholic population (it was not started due to World War II).

In October 1935, residents of Telšiai attacked Jewish businesses and individuals due to rumors of a rape of a young woman and kidnapping of a child. 18 city residents were sentenced to jail time. Staugaitis agreed to address the congregation to cease anti-Jewish violence and agitation.

In 1938, during a visit to Vatican, Staugaitis asked to appoint Vincentas Borisevičius as an auxiliary bishop. It was announced in February 1940.

The ruling Lithuanian Nationalist Union treated the Christian Democrats and, by extension, the Roman Catholic Church as its enemy. The Lithuanian government implemented various anti-Catholic policies leading to tensions with the clergy. Staugaitis was participated in various efforts to mediate the disputes and discussions between bishops and government ministers. Despite the tensions, on 16 February 1933 (anniversary of the Act of Independence of Lithuania), Staugaitis was awarded the Order of the Lithuanian Grand Duke Gediminas (1st degree).

==== Priest seminary ====
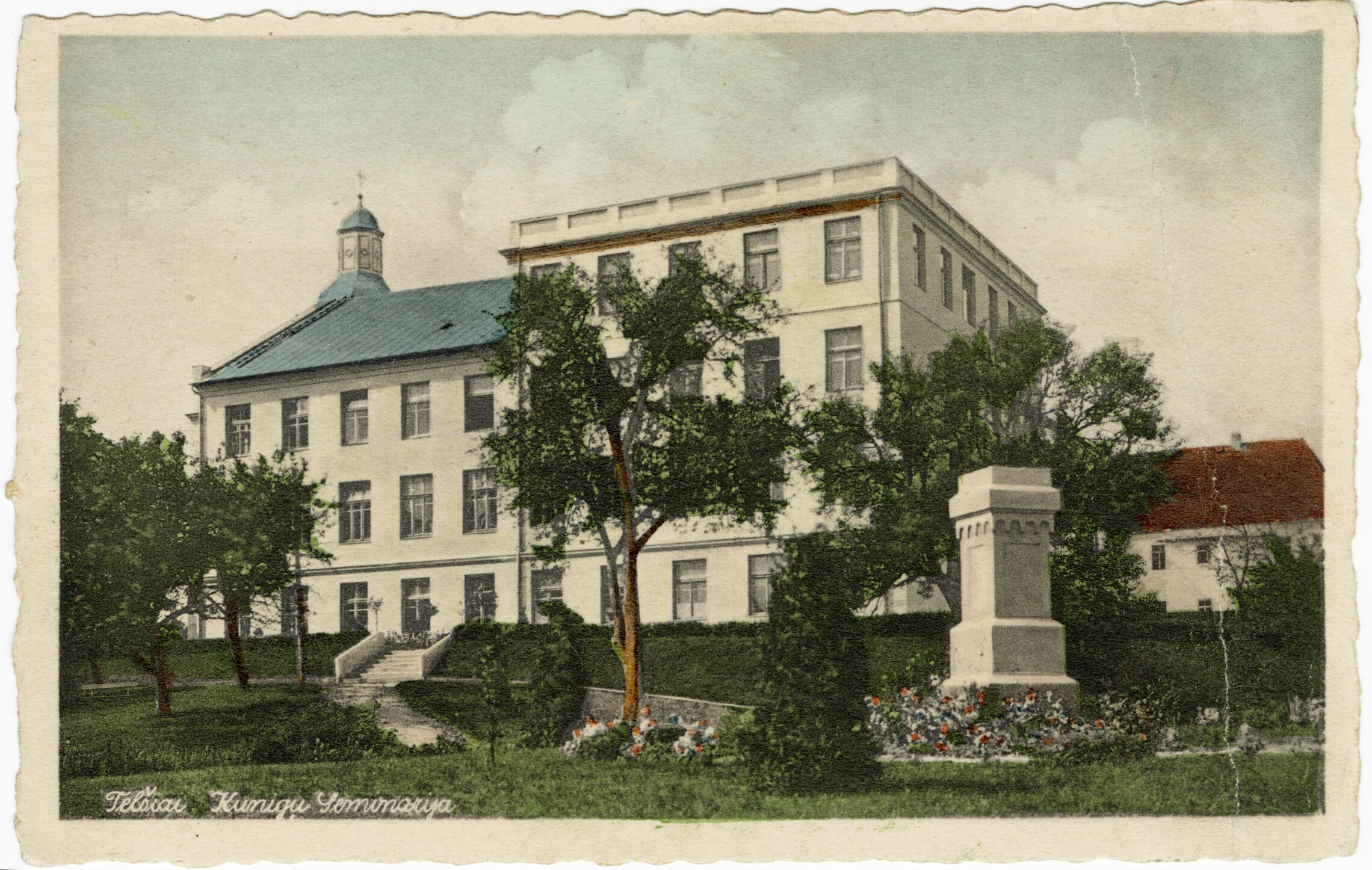
Seminary premises in Telšiai (interwar postcard)

To address the shortage of priests, Staugaitis established the Telšiai Priest Seminary on 4 October 1927 despite lack of funds and qualified teachers. It was a few days after the Concordat of 1927 was signed which provided that each diocese would have a priest seminary. Initially, it was a minor seminary, i.e. a religious secondary school for students thinking about priesthood. It was elevated to major seminary, i.e. school for clerics, in 1929 despite government push back and refusal of financial support.

At first, the seminary used the western wing of the former Bernardine Monastery. Staugaitis initiated the construction of a new seminary building based on a project by the architect Povilas Taračkovas. The construction cost was estimated at 351,214 litas. The construction started in May 1928 and was completed in six months. By 1939, the seminary outgrew the premises but reconstruction plans were interrupted by the outbreak of World War II.

==== World War II ====
In March 1939, Nazi Germany annexed Klaipėda Region and Staugaitis lost access to the Territorial Prelature of Klaipėda that he administered. The Holy See appointed Maximilian Kaller, bishop of Warmia, as the acting administrator of the prelature on 10 June 1939.

Lithuania was occupied by the Soviet Union in June 1940. The Soviets brought repressions against Catholic institutions and clergy. Telšiai Priest Seminary was closed and bishop's residence was nationalized. Reportedly, Staugaitis was on the list of people to be deported during the June deportation but at the time he was visiting relatives in Suvalkija. At the start of the German invasion of the Soviet Union, retreating Soviets tortured and executed 73 Lithuanian political prisoners in the Rainiai massacre. Jewish authors identify that it was Staugaitis along with other city officials who decided to turn their funeral into a public event where the public directed their anger and hatred towards the Jews.

In June 1941, Germans rounded up Jews in Telšiai. Rasya, wife of rabbi Avraham Yitzchak Bloch, pleaded with Staugaitis for help, but was refused. In July–August 194, about 4,000 Jewish women and children were gathered in a camp in Geruliai and again appealed to Staugaitis asking to intervene with Lithuanian guards, but again were rebuffed. In December 1941, after the liquidation of the Telšiai Ghetto, Staugaitis hid Roza Gurvitch with her son Jakov for a week in his house. On 12 July 1941, Staugaitis issued a pastoral letter which talked about helping those in need and avoiding revenge, but did not openly protest against the Holocaust in Lithuania. This letter remains the only official warning against violence by a Lithuanian bishop in the initial months of the German occupation. Overall, Staugaitis avoided getting politically involved with the occupying German forces.

Germans were more tolerant of Lithuanian cultural and religious activities. Staugaitis reopened the priest seminary in September 1941. In summer 1942, he opposed the efforts to reorganize the Vilnius Priest Seminary by Mečislovas Reinys.

=== Death ===
Staugaitis had a weak heart. He had the first heart attack in 1939 while on his way to a eucharistic congress in Budapest. He sought various treatments in spas in Vichy in France, Krynica-Zdrój in Poland, Birštonas in Lithuania. In June 1943, he had trouble traveling but had a long conversation with Theodor Adrian von Renteln, the General Commissioner of Generalbezirk Litauen, and managed to secure the release of two priests, Pranas Baltrumas and Vladislovas Taškūnas, on condition that Staugaitis issued a public anti-Soviet letter encouraging Lithuanians to join German units.

Staugaitis died on 8 July 1943. He was buried in a crypt under the main altar of the Telšiai Cathedral.

== Publications ==
=== Articles ===
Staugaitis began publishing articles in the Lithuanian press in 1905. In total, Staugaitis published more than 350 articles. He published articles in Vilniaus žinios, Lietuvių laikraštis, Šaltinis, Viltis, Vadovas, Vienybė, Draugija, Spindulys, Tėvynės sargas, Lietuvos aidas, Laisvė, Lietuva, Tiesos kelias, Rytas, XX amžius, Naujoji Romuva, and others. Most of his articles were signed by various pen names, including Meškus, Panenupis, Zanavykas.

As editor of Vadovas, Staugaitis established himself as an ideologue of the Christian Democrats. He debated with more liberal activists and staunchly defended the role Christian values in politics. As a result of these debates, he published 12 separate booklets with copies of Pirmeivių žiedai, a section in Vadovas dedicated to review and critique of atheist writings.

As bishop, Staugaitis supported the weekly Žemaičių prietelius and made it the diocesan newspaper.

=== Books ===
In total, Staugaitis published 17 books.

Staugaitis published a 215-page study on the history of the Catholic Church in 1911; it was republished in 1922. It was not an academic publication – Staugaitis did not cite his sources or include a bibliography.

In 1920, while debating the 1922 Constitution of Lithuania, Staugaitis published a booklet defending the role of the church in state affairs and arguing against the separation of church and state.

In 1933, Vincas Mykolaitis-Putinas published novel Altorių šešėlyje (In Altars' Shadow) which described internal struggles of a young man who ends up renouncing priesthood. Staugaitis published a critical review of the book complaining that Mykolaitis-Putinas showed only the dark side of priesthood. Staugaitis, under the pen name J. Gintautas, then published a three-part novella Tiesiu keliu (On the Straight Path) about priest's calling and mission in 1934–1935. He also wrote a 170-page novella Tarp jausmų ir pareigos (Between Feelings and Duty) but it remains unpublished.

Staugaitis' sermons were collected and published in a separate book in 1940.

== Legacy ==
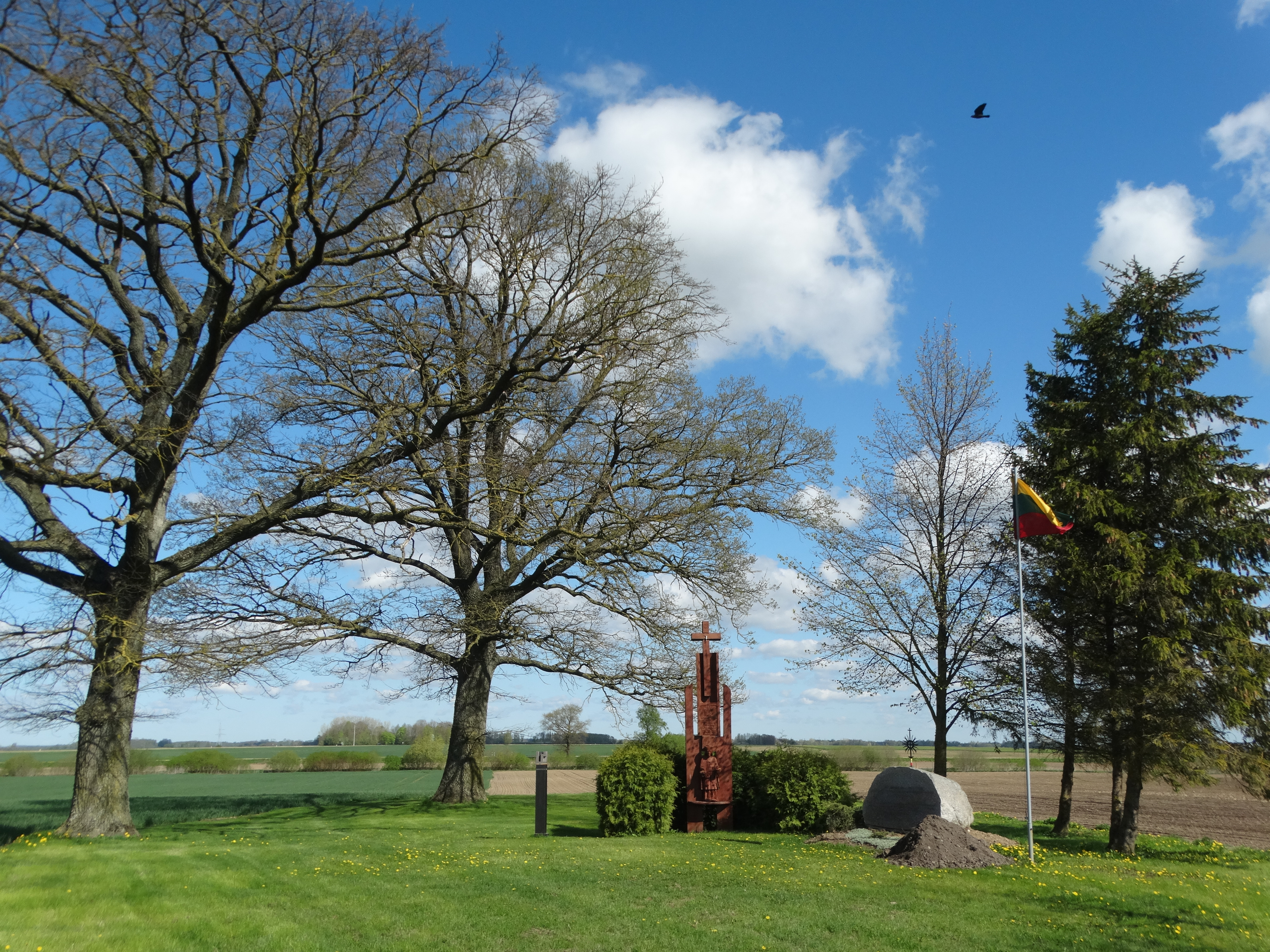
Memorial markers at the birthplace of Staugaitis

In 1936, for his 10th anniversary as bishop, his biography was published by Rapolas Kuodis. In 2011, his biography by Stasys Vaitekūnas was published by the Science and Encyclopaedia Publishing Centre.

Staugaitis' memoirs were published by the Lithuanian Catholic Academy of Science in 1995 (second edition in 2006). The memoirs were written in 1927–1941 and distributed among relatives and friends in four typewritten volumes. The original manuscript was believed to have been lost until the first volume was found in 2025.

Streets name after Staugaitis are located in Aukštoji Panemunė (since 1990), Telšiai (near cathedral since 2020), Vilnius, Šakiai, as well as near his birth place in Žvirgždaičiai and Tupikai.

Staugaitis' birthplace has not survived but the location is marked by a memorial stone and cross. A memorial plaque by sculptor Osvaldas Neniškis was affixed to the bishops' residence in Telšiai in 2016 (his 150th birth anniversary).

== Bibliography ==
- Akmenytė-Ruzgienė, Vilma. "1920–1940 m. Seimo Pirmininkai". Seimas Lietuvos Respublikoje (1920–1940 m.) (in Lithuanian). Lietuvos Respublikos Seimo kanceliarija.
- Akmenytė-Ruzgienė, Vilma; Mačiukas, Žydrūnas. "Staugaitis Justinas (1866–1943)". Seimas Lietuvos Respublikoje (1920–1940 m.) (in Lithuanian). Lietuvos Respublikos Seimo kanceliarija.
- Alperovičius, Izaokas, ed. (2022). Telšiai. Atminties knyga (PDF) (in Lithuanian). Translated by Lempertienė, Lara; et al. Žemaičių muziejus "Alka". ISBN 978-609-8234-32-9.
- BNS (16 March 2025). "Telšių vyskupijos archyve rasti dingusiais laikyti vyskupo Justino Staugaičio rankraščiai" (in Lithuanian). Vakarų ekspresas.
- Brizgys, Vincentas (1977). Katalikų bažnyčia Lietuvoje 1940–1944 metais (PDF) (in Lithuanian). Chicago: Draugas. OCLC 3394692.
- Bucevičė, Janina (2026). ""Žemaičių prietelius" – laikraštis, kūręs modernaus žemaičio tapatybę" (PDF). Žemaičių žemė (in Lithuanian). 5 (160): 18–20. ISSN 2783-6436.
- Butrimas, Adomas (2008). Telšiai: sakralinis kompleksas Insulos kalvoje. Telšiai: the Sacral Ensemble on Insula Hill. Vilniaus dailės akademijos leidykla. ISBN 978-9955-854-02-9.
- Eidintas, Alfonsas; Žalys, Vytautas; Senn, Alfred Erich (1999). Tuskenis, Edvardas (ed.). Lithuania in European Politics: The Years of the First Republic, 1918-1940 (Paperback ed.). New York: St. Martin's Press. ISBN 0-312-22458-3.
- Gimžauskas, Edmundas (2022). "Dėl 1918 m. kovo 23 d. Lietuvos valstybingumo pripažinimo iš kaizerinės Vokietijos pusės". Lietuvos istorijos metraštis (in Lithuanian). 1: 105–130. doi:10.33918/25386549-202201005.
- Greenberg, Gershon (2004). "Holocaust and Musar for the Telšiai Yeshivah: Avraham Yitshak and Eliyahu Meir Bloch". In Nikžentaitis, Alvydas; Schreiner, Stefan; Staliūnas, Darius (eds.). The Vanished World of Lithuanian Jews. Rodopi. ISBN 9789042008502.
- Jagminas, Leonardas (27 February 2025) [2018]. "eucharistiniai kongresai". Visuotinė lietuvių enciklopedija (in Lithuanian). Mokslo ir enciklopedijų leidybos centras.
- Jakubauskas, Ramūnas (7 March 2020). "Telšiuose įamžintas signataro, kunigų seminarijos steigėjo J.Staugaičio atminimas". 15min.lt (in Lithuanian).
- Kasparavičius, Algimantas (2008). Tarp politikos ir diplomatijos: Šventasis Sostas ir Lietuvos Respublika (in Lithuanian). Lietuvos istorijos instituto leidykla. ISBN 978-9955-847-03-8.
- Katilius, Algimantas (2006). "Justino Staugaičio bibliografija". Mano atsiminimai. By Staugaitis, Justinas (in Lithuanian) (2nd ed.). Vilnius: Katalikų akademija. ISBN 9986592534.
- Katilius, Algimantas (2008). "Kunigo Justino Staugaičio visuomeninė veikla 1905-1915 metais". Lietuvių katalikų mokslo akademijos metraštis (in Lithuanian). 31: 11–37. ISSN 1392-0502.
- Kauno apskrities viešoji Ąžuolyno biblioteka. "Staugaitis Justinas". Žymūs Kauno žmonės: atminimo įamžinimas (in Lithuanian).
- Kuodys, Rapolas (2006). "J. E. Telšių Vyskupas Justinas Staugaitis". Mano atsiminimai. By Staugaitis, Justinas (in Lithuanian) (2nd ed.). Vilnius: Katalikų akademija. ISBN 9986592534.
- Laukaitytė, Regina (2006a). "Staugaitis, Justinas". In Ragauskas, Aivas; Tamošaitis, Mindaugas (eds.). Lietuvos Steigiamojo Seimo (1920–1922 metų) narių biografinis žodynas. Didysis Lietuvos parlamentarų biografinis žodynas (in Lithuanian). Vol. 2. Vilnius: Vilniaus pedagoginis universitetas. pp. 360–362. ISBN 9789955201465.
- Laukaitytė, Regina (2006b). "Vyskupas Justinas Staugaitis ir jo atsiminimai". Mano atsiminimai. By Staugaitis, Justinas (in Lithuanian) (2nd ed.). Vilnius: Katalikų akademija. ISBN 9986592534.
- Laukaitytė, Regina (2007). "Staugaitis, Justinas". In Ragauskas, Aivas; Tamošaitis, Mindaugas (eds.). Lietuvos Respublikos Seimų I (1922–1923), II (1923–1926), III (1926–1927), IV (1936–1940) narių biografinis žodynas. Didysis Lietuvos parlamentarų biografinis žodynas (in Lithuanian). Vol. 3. Vilniaus pedagoginis universitetas. pp. 486–487. ISBN 978-9955-20-345-2.
- Laukaitytė, Regina (2008). "Justinas Staugaitis ‒ politikas" (PDF). Lietuvių katalikų mokslo akademijos metraštis (in Lithuanian). 31: 39–48. ISSN 1392-0502.
- Laukaitytė, Regina (2010). Lietuvos bažnyčios vokiečių okupacijos metais (1941–1944) (in Lithuanian). Vilnius: Lietuvos istorijos instituto leidykla. ISBN 9789955847274.
- Maksimaitis, Mindaugas (2011). Mažoji konstituanta: Lietuvos taryba atkuriant valstybingumą (in Lithuanian). Justitia. ISBN 978-9955-616-65-8.
- Maps.lt. "J. Staugaičio g." (in Lithuanian). UAB "HNIT-BALTIC".
- Norkevičius, Julius (3 March 2018). "Telšių laikraščių žvilgsnis į gimtinę". Kalvotoji Žemaitija (in Lithuanian).
- Rosin, Josef (2005). Preserving Our Litvak Heritage. A History of 31 Jewish Communities in Lithuania. Vol. I. League City, TX: JewishGen. ISBN 9780976475903.
- Selčinskaja, Danutė, ed. (2009). Hands Bringing Life and Death (PDF). Vol. 4. Translated by Dailidėnaitė, Alina; Koncevičiūtė, Elena. The Vilna Gaon State Jewish Museum. ISBN 978-9955-767-06-0.
- Schneiderman, Harry, ed. (1936). The American Jewish Year Book. Vol. 38. Philadelphia: Jewish Publication Society of America.
- Staugaitis, Justinas (2006). Mano atsiminimai (in Lithuanian) (2nd ed.). Vilnius: Katalikų akademija. ISBN 9986592534.
- Streikus, Arūnas (2012). "Klaipėdos krašto katalikų integravimas į Lietuvos bažnytinę provinciją 1926–1939 m." (PDF). Bažnyčios istorijos studijos. 5: 343–370. ISSN 1392-0502.
- Sužiedėlis, Saulius (2025). Crisis, War, and the Holocaust in Lithuania. Lithuanian Studies without Borders. Academic Studies Press. ISBN 9798887194912.
- Tamaševičius, Justas (2025). XX a. lietuvių istoriografijos požiūris į Reformaciją (Thesis) (in Lithuanian). Vytautas Magnus University.
- Telšių r. sav. admin. (6 October 2016). "Justino Staugaičio atminimas bus įamžintas ant Vyskupų rūmų". Kalvotoji Žemaitija (in Lithuanian).
- Vaitekūnas, Stasys (2011). Justinas Staugaitis: vyskupas, politikas, tautos dvasios ir valstybės puoselėtojas (in Lithuanian). Vilnius: Mokslo ir enciklopedijų leidybos centras. ISBN 9785420016923.

Catholic Church titles
new jurisdiction seceded from the Diocese of Samogitia	Bishop of Telšiai; 1926–1943	Succeeded by Vincentas Borisevičius
new jurisdiction seceded from the Diocese of Ermland	Prelate of Klaipėda (Memel); 1926–1939	Succeeded by Maximilian Kaller as Apostolic Administrator
