= Žiburys Society =

Lithuanian educational organization

Žiburys Society (žiburys means light, beacon; Lithuanian: Lietuvių krikščionių draugija „Žiburys“) was a society established in 1906 that organized and maintained Lithuanian schools in the Suwałki Governorate of the Congress Poland, Russian Empire (later, Suvalkija region of independent Lithuania). Organized and run by priests, the society supported and promoted Roman Catholic ideas and worldview. The society organized primary schools and later gymnasiums. In 1907, it established pro-gymnasium for girls in Marijampolė. In 1918, it established several gymnasiums. Žiburys, along with other Lithuanian organizations, was closed by the new Soviet regime following the occupation of Lithuania by the Soviet Union in June 1940.

== Establishment ==
After the failed Uprising of 1863, the Tsarist regime enacted strict Russification policies: the Lithuanian press was prohibited, all non-government schools were closed, and government schools prohibited the use of the Lithuanian language. Lithuanians resisted such policies and organized illegal schools taught by daraktorius. The restrictions were lifted in 1904 and Lithuanians organized societies Saulė (Sun) in the Kovno Governorate and Žiburys in the Suwałki Governorate to fund and operate Lithuanian schools. The Lithuanian Education Society Rytas in the Vilna Governorate was established only in 1913.

Leftist Lithuanians established Šviesa (light), led by future president Kazys Grinius, in December 1905. However, seven of its members left it in protest when the new society voted that the religious class should be taught by a regular teacher and not a priest. (The Tsarist regime closed Šviesa in 1908). Priest Justinas Staugaitis then took on to organize Žiburys and the founding meeting took place on 6 January 1906 in Marijampolė. Staugaitis was elected as chairman, but he was soon reassigned to Lekėčiai and priest Motiejus Gustaitis became the long-term chairman of Žiburys. The society was officially approved and registered on 15 May 1906.

== Before World War I ==
In the Suwałki Governorate, most teachers were Lithuanian and taught in the Lithuanian language. Thus, the establishment of Lithuanian-language schools was less urgent than elsewhere. Initially, Žiburys established unofficial schools building on the traditions of the clandestine Lithuanian schools. In 1910, it officially registered nine primary schools with 465 students. In total, before World War I, the society had about 20 primary schools. On 22 September 1907, Žiburys opened a girls' pro-gymnasium with a dormitory in Marijampolė. It had 52 students in 1909 and 91 students in 1914. In 1908, the society invited Marija Pečkauskaitė (Šatrijos Ragana), who had studied pedagogy in Switzerland, to direct the pro-gymnasium. Twice the society petitioned the government of the Congress Poland for a permission to elevate the school to gymnasium status but was refused. Its petitions for a boys' pro-gymnasium in Sejny were similarly rejected. In 1907, the society established an evening school for adults in Vilkaviškis (50 students). The society also established local chapters that had small libraries and reading rooms. In 1909, there were 54 chapters with 3,556 members. In total, it had 58 libraries and 38 reading rooms. In 1911–1914, the society published five issues of the Žiburys magazine which reported on the activities of the society and discussed issues of Lithuanian education.

Until 1918, the society did not receive any government funding and had to rely on school tuition, membership fees, and donations. To raise funds, Žiburys organized various public lectures (speakers included Juozas Tumas-Vaižgantas, Petras Leonas, Marija Pečkauskaitė), music performances, amateur theater plays. The plays included drama Ponas ir mužikai by Aleksandras Fromas-Gužutis, comedy by Jean-François Bayard, adaptation of Genovefa by Christoph von Schmid, opera Birutė by Mikas Petrauskas, Velnias spąstuose by Žemaitė and Gabrielė Petkevičaitė-Bitė, The Bear by Anton Chekhov, Nepadėjus nėr ko kasti by Juozas Tumas-Vaižgantas. In 1914, society's chairman Motiejus Gustaitis traveled to United States to collect donations from Lithuanian Americans for the construction of a dedicated school building in Marijampolė, but the plans were interrupted by the outbreak of World War I.

== Interwar period ==
During World War I, the girls' pro-gymnasium evacuated to Tambov where it had about 180 students. In 1918, the society and its schools returned to newly independent Lithuania. Gymnasiums were established in Šakiai, Prienai, Vilkaviškis, Sejny (moved to Lazdijai in 1921 due to the Polish–Lithuanian War), Kražiai even before the Lithuanian Ministry of Education was organized. In 1930s, these gymnasiums, except for the ones in Šakiai and Prienai, were taken over by the Lithuanian government. It was an intentional effort by the authoritarian regime of President Antanas Smetona to reduce the influence of the Catholic Church and by extension its main political opponent the Lithuanian Christian Democratic Party.

The society also established specialized schools, including an agricultural school for girls in Karkliniai in 1924 and a higher school of commerce in Kybartai in 1925. To raise teachers' qualifications, Žiburys established two-year courses for teachers in Pilviškiai and Kudirkos Naumiestis. The society also established a kindergarten, several shelters for children and the elderly.
