= Gustaitis =

Gustaitis is a Lithuanian surname. Notable people with the surname include:

- Abby Gustaitis (born 1991), American rugby union player
- Antanas Gustaitis (1898–1941), Lithuanian aviator
- Motiejus Gustaitis (1870–1927), Lithuanian poet
