= Kretkampis =

- Village
- Location within Lithuania
- Coordinates: 55°00′18″N 23°30′18″E
- Country: Lithuania
- County: Marijampolė County
- Municipality: Šakiai district municipality
- Eldership: Lekėčiai eldership

Population (2011)
  - Total: 64
- Time zone: UTC+2 (EET)
  - Summer (DST): UTC+3 (EEST)

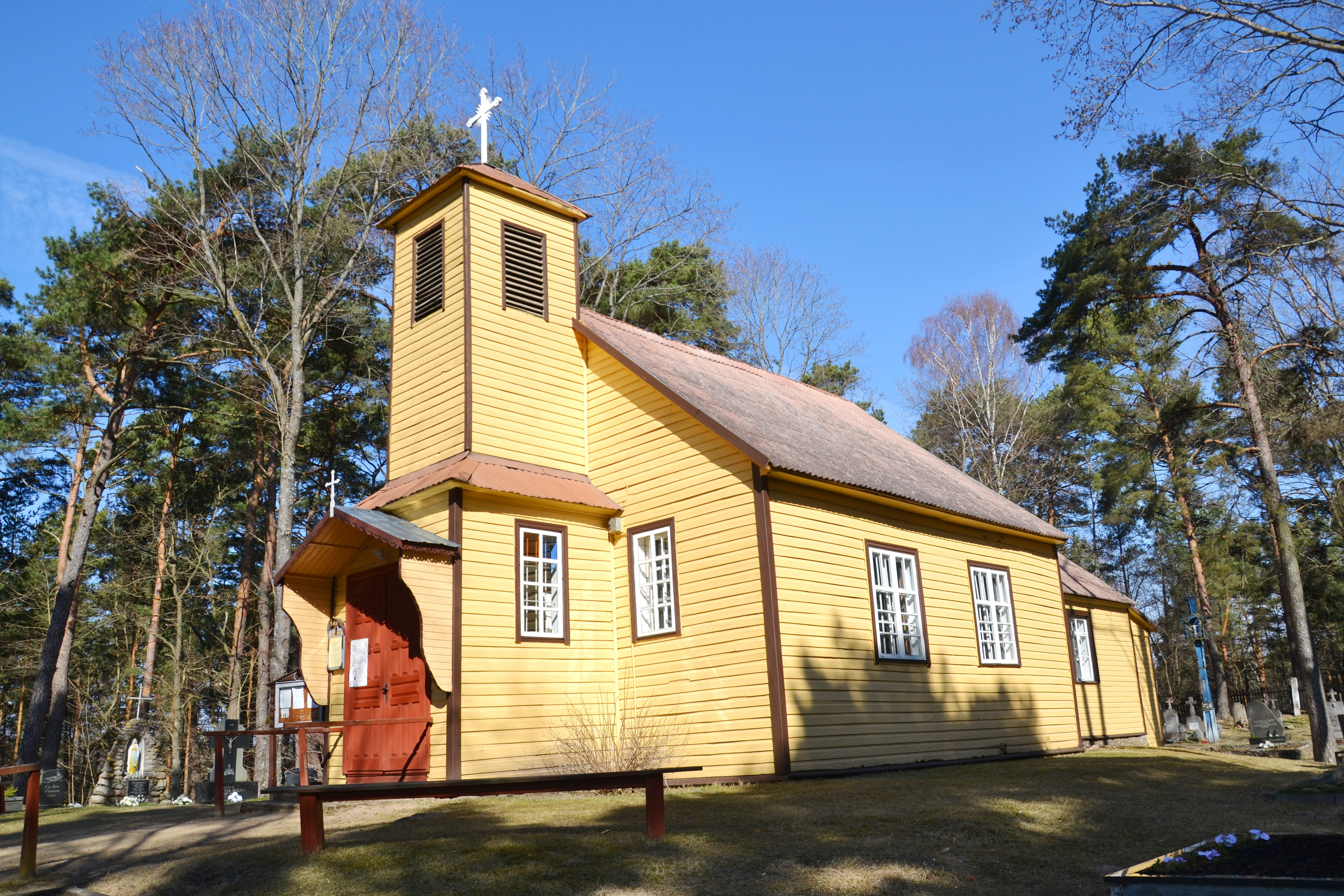
Church of Kretkampis

Kretkampis is a village in Lithuania, located 35 km (22 mi) from Kaunas and 2 km (1.2 mi) from Lekėčiai. It is situated on the bank of Nemunas River. According to the 2011 census, the village had 64 residents although in 1959 there were still 206 residents. In 1918 there was built a wooden St. Steponas church next to which there is also a cemetery.

== History ==
The village used to belong to Vilkija eldership and there used to be a manor. The owner of Kretkampis' manor Steponas Vaizbūnas has built a chapel in 1866. In 1908 it was renovated by priest Romanas Zaremba who also built a wooden vestry. The mass were held in the vestry up until 1918 when priest Sabas has built a bigger wooden chapel which was given church rights after World War II
