= Motiejus Gustaitis =

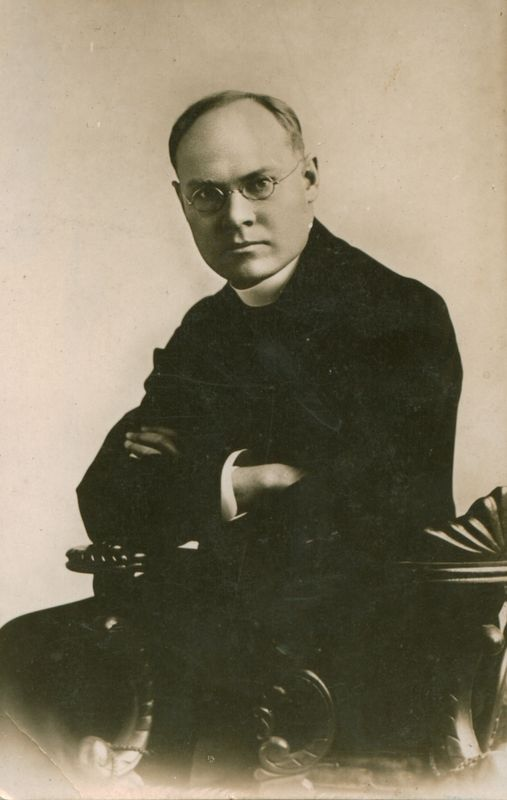
- Gustaitis in 1927
- Born: 27 February 1870; Pajiesys, Suwałki Governorate, Russian Empire
- Died: 23 December 1927 (aged 57); Lazdijai, Lithuania
- Education: Sejny Priest Seminary; University of Fribourg
- Occupations: Priest, poet, translator, educator
- Board member of: Žiburys Society

Motiejus Gustaitis (27 February 1870 – 23 December 1927) was a Lithuanian Symbolist poet, who used numerous pseudonyms (among them Balandis, Bendrakelionis, Embė, G. M., K. M. G.). He was also a translator and educator, as well as a Catholic priest. A long-term chairman of the Žiburys Society, Gustaitis worked to establish Lithuanian schools and advocated girls' education. He worked as principal of girls' pro-gymnasium in Marijampolė and coed gymnasium in Lazdijai.

== Biography ==
Gustaitis was born Pajiesys near Garliava, but grew up in Rokai near Panemunė. He studied at the Marijampolė Gymnasium (1881–1886) and Sejny Priest Seminary. In 1893, he was ordained priest and worked in Marijampolė. He continued studies at the College of Catholic Church Music and Musical Education in Regensburg, Pontifical Gregorian University and Pontifical Roman Athenaeum S. Apollinare in Rome. At the University of Fribourg he defended his PhD thesis on orientalist influences in works, particularly The Crimean Sonnets, of poet Adam Mickiewicz.

Gustaitis returned to Lithuania in 1904 and worked as teacher of religious studies at the Marijampolė Gymnasium. After the Russian Revolution of 1905, various Russification policies were relaxed and it became possible to establish Lithuanian societies. In January 1906, priest Justinas Staugaitis organized the Žiburys Society to establish and maintain various Lithuanian schools in the Suwałki Governorate (Suvalkija). However, Staugaitis was soon reassigned to Lekėčiai and Gustaitis became the long-term chairman of Žiburys. One of the major achievements of the society was establishment of the girls' pro-gymnasium in Marijampolė in 1907 of which Gustaitis was principal. He was a vocal advocate of girls' education. Twice Gustaitis petitioned the government of the Congress Poland for a permission to elevate the school to the gymnasium status but was refused. In 1914, he traveled to United States to collect donations from Lithuanian Americans for a construction of school buildings in Marijampolė, but the plans failed due to the outbreak of World War I. His first poetry books were printed in United States at that time.

At the start of the war, Gustaitis evacuated to Yaroslavl together with the Marijampolė Gymnasium. There, he helped organizing seven primary schools and a coed pro-gymnasium. He returned to Lithuania in 1918 to become the principal of the newly established gymnasium in Sejny. However, the town was at the center of the Polish–Lithuanian War and the gymnasium evacuated to Lazdijai. He continued to head the gymnasium until his sudden death in 1927. Since 1995, the gymnasium bears his name: Lazdijų Motiejaus Gustaičio gimnazija. In 1990, his former home was turned into a memorial museum.

== Works ==
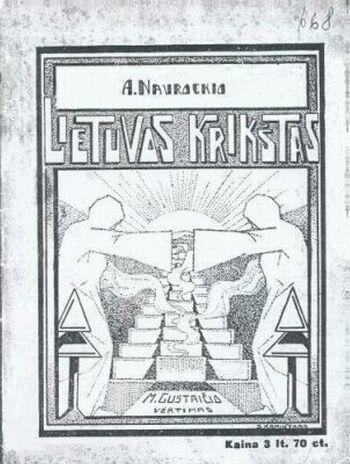
Cover of The Conversion of Lithuania by Alexander Navrotsky translated by Gustaitis (1927)

Gustaitis's published works could be divided into three general categories: original poetry, translations, and non-fiction texts on issues of literature and culture. His poetry and articles were published in numerous Lithuanian-language periodicals, including Ateitis, Tėvynės sargas, Vairas, Viltis, Vilniaus žinios. He also edited and published five issues of the Žiburys magazine which reported on the activities of the Žiburys Society and discussed issues of Lithuanian education.

Gustaitis started writing poetry in 1893. His first book of poetry Tėvynės ašaros (Tears of the Motherland) came out in 1914 in Chicago. It was followed by Erškėčių taku (On the Path of Thorns, 1916), Sielos akordai (Chords of the Soul, 1917), and Varpeliai (Little Bells, 1925). He also wrote cantata Broliai (Brothers; music by Česlovas Sasnauskas), oratorio Aureolė (Aureola; combines patriotic feelings with religious mysticism), poem Meilė (Love; an allegoric tale of self-sacrifice), and four-part musical drama Gaustas ir Zapsė (unpublished). A comprehensive collection of his works was prepared in 1940, but it was not published due to World War II. Literary critics often found his poetry to be heavy, cold, lacking emotions, and struggling with metre. His poetry is a deep reflection on abstract idealism (represented as heaven, cosmos, sky, abstract references to the divine) and harsh reality as well as a reflection of patriotic love for the homeland.

Gustaitis was fond of classical Greek and Roman texts and translated some of them into the Lithuanian language, including various works by Virgil (second book of Aeneid), Cicero (Catiline Orations), Horace (several poems), Ovid, Demosthenes. He also translated Latin poetry of Italian Renaissance poet Petrarch and Polish Baroque poet Maciej Kazimierz Sarbiewski. He translated works by Adam Mickiewicz (The Crimean Sonnets and Dziady) and Juliusz Słowacki (Anhelli) from Polish, and works by Alexander Navrotsky (The Conversion of Lithuania) and Jurgis Baltrušaitis from Russian. The first translations of Charles Baudelaire's poetry into Lithuanian also belong to Gustaitis.

His acclaimed textbook on the theory of literature Stilistika came out in 1923. In 1919, he published a book on his observations of the American education system that he made during his trip in 1914. He also published biographical works on Lithuanian priests Antanas Tatarė, Juozapas Galeckas, Petras Kriaučiūnas, Latin poet Maciej Kazimierz Sarbiewski, Lithuanian patriarch Jonas Basanavičius, Roman Emperor Julius Caesar.
