= Žemaičių prietelius =

Lithuanian-language newspaper (1925–1940)

Žemaičių prietelius (transl. Friend of the Samogitians) was a Lithuanian-language Roman Catholic weekly newspaper published in Telšiai, Lithuania, from 18 March 1925 to 28 June 1940. A total of 758 issues were published. It was a conservative newspaper published by the Diocese of Telšiai which promoted Catholicism and Lithuanian patriotism. It also supported the use of the Samogitian dialect and published texts in the dialect.

== History ==
The newspaper was established by priest Pranciškus Ramanauskas and other Catholic activists in Telšiai. It was officially published by the Telšiai Catholic Action Center (Telšių katalikų veikimo centras) to promote the Lithuanian Christian Democratic Party in the Diocese of Samogitia. When the Diocese of Telšiai was established in 1926, bishop Justinas Staugaitis supported the newspaper and made it a de facto diocesan newspaper. The diocese provided financial support, while the bishop contributed articles. A published budget from 1938 showed that the newspaper expected to earn about 13,000 litas and needed 3,673 litas from the diocese to cover expected expenses.

The newspaper was first printed in Kaunas. In 1928, the diocese acquired a printing shop in Telšiai and the newspaper was published there. The annual subscription decreased from 5 litas to 3 litas. The circulation increased from about 3,000 copies to 5,000.

The newspaper was closed shortly after the Soviet occupation of Lithuania in June 1940. During the German occupation of Lithuania during World War II, the newspaper was replaced by Žemaičių žemė published in 1941–1944.

== Content ==
Overall, Žemaičių prietelius was a conservative newspaper defending Catholicism, Lithuanian patriotism, and democracy. For example, several times it criticized the more liberal Catholic daily XX amžius.

The newspaper had four to twelve pages. Its length and variety of content grew in late 1930s. It published a review of news from Lithuania and abroad, moral texts, bishop's pastoral letters, articles on social issues (e.g. harms of alcoholism, reduction of poverty). It also published local religious, cultural, and economic news, criminal stories, reports on activities of Catholic organizations. It collaborated with other cultural institutions, including the Samogitian Museum Alka, and published reviews of exhibitions, theater plays, and other cultural events. The newspaper had several supplements for youth, families, new farmers, but they were published irregularly.

The newspaper promoted the Samogitian dialect, particularly under the editor Kazimieras Olšauskas in the late 1930s. It published a regular column which encouraged to use the dialect in writing. The newspaper published examples of Samogitian folklore (legends, fairy tales, riddles, songs, proverbs, etc.). It also published articles on Samogitian culture (e.g. traditional clothing, holidays). In December 1939, it published basic writing rules of the Samogitian dialect sparking linguistic debates and criticism of encouraging separatism. It borrowed Latvian letters ā, ē, ī, ū for long vowels and the printing shop needed to order special sorts to accommodate the spelling.

The newspaper did not limit itself to Samogitia and published articles about other regions of Lithuania, including Suvalkija, Aukštaitija, and Vilnius Region which was then part of the Second Polish Republic. The newspaper published stories about Klaipėda Region encouraging Lithuanians to move there and establish Lithuanian organizations. After the region was annexed by Nazi Germany in 1939, the newspaper urged to provide aid to the refugees.

The newspaper was subject to strict censorship by the ruling Lithuanian Nationalist Union. Newspaper's editor Kazimieras Berulis was twice sentenced to brief jail time for violating censorship laws.

== Title ==
The world prietelius is a Slavic barbarism and is not used in modern standard Lithuanian. The newspaper received criticism for such choice, but defended it because linguist Kazimieras Būga used it in his correspondence.

== Personnel ==
=== Contributors ===
The newspaper's articles were written by numerous contributors, including bishops Justinas Staugaitis and Pranas Būčys, priests Vincentas Borisevičius, Jurgis Narjauskas, Kazimieras Olšauskas, and others. Many of the articles were signed by pen names or initials which makes identification of authors difficult.

In 1930s, the newspaper published numerous small works of fiction, including the first poems by Vytautas Mačernis, Paulius Jurkus, Pranas Genys, and poems by Paulius Drevinis.

=== Editors ===
The newspaper's editors were:

- Jurgis Dagilis (1925–1926)
- Juozas Mačernis (1926–1927)
- Bronė Norvaišaitė (1926–1927)
- Petras Maželis (1928–1931)
- Kazimieras Berulis (1932–1935)
- Pranciškus Ramanauskas (1936)
- Feliksas Gureckas (1936)
- Vytautas Motiekaitis (1936–1938)
- Kazimieras Olšauskas (1936–1940)
