= Karkliniai =

- Village
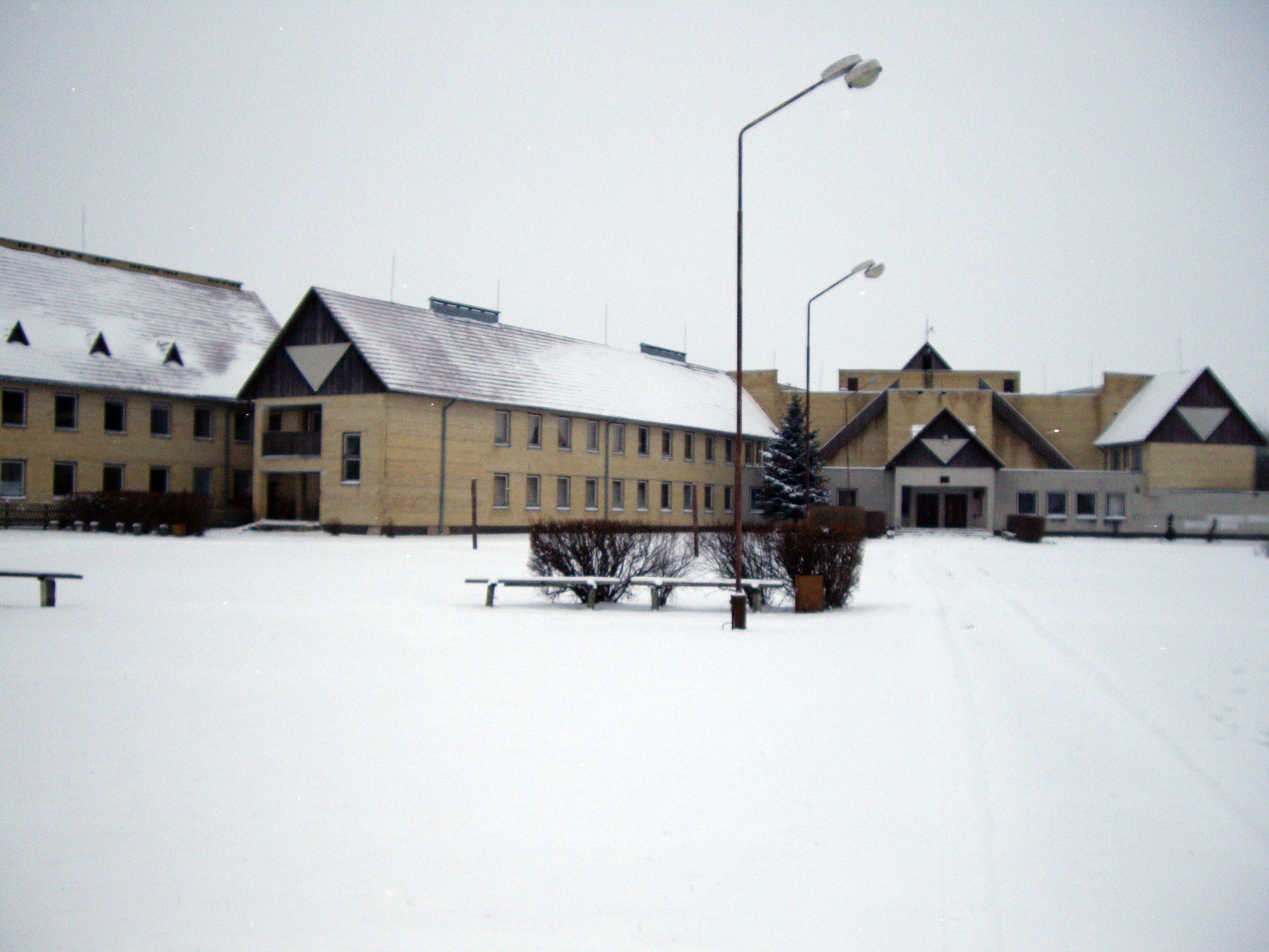
- House of Culture

- Location of Karkliniai
- Coordinates: 54°31′50″N 23°09′50″E
- Country: Lithuania
- Ethnographic region: Suvalkija
- County: Marijampolė County
- Municipality: Vilkaviškis district municipality
- Eldership: Keturvalakiai eldership

Population (2011)
  - Total: 435
- Time zone: UTC+2 (EET)
  - Summer (DST): UTC+3 (EEST)
- Website: http://www.karkliniai.blogspot.com

Karkliniai is a village in southwest Lithuania, Vilkaviškis district. According to the census of 2011, it had a population of 435. The river Rausvė flows nearby.

== History ==
Since the nineteenth century until 1914 the village was volost district center. At the end of 1905 the workers of Karkliniai estate were on strike. After the First World War, in 1927 in Karkliniai estate was founded The Girls' Lower Agricultural School.
