= Pakuonis =

- Town
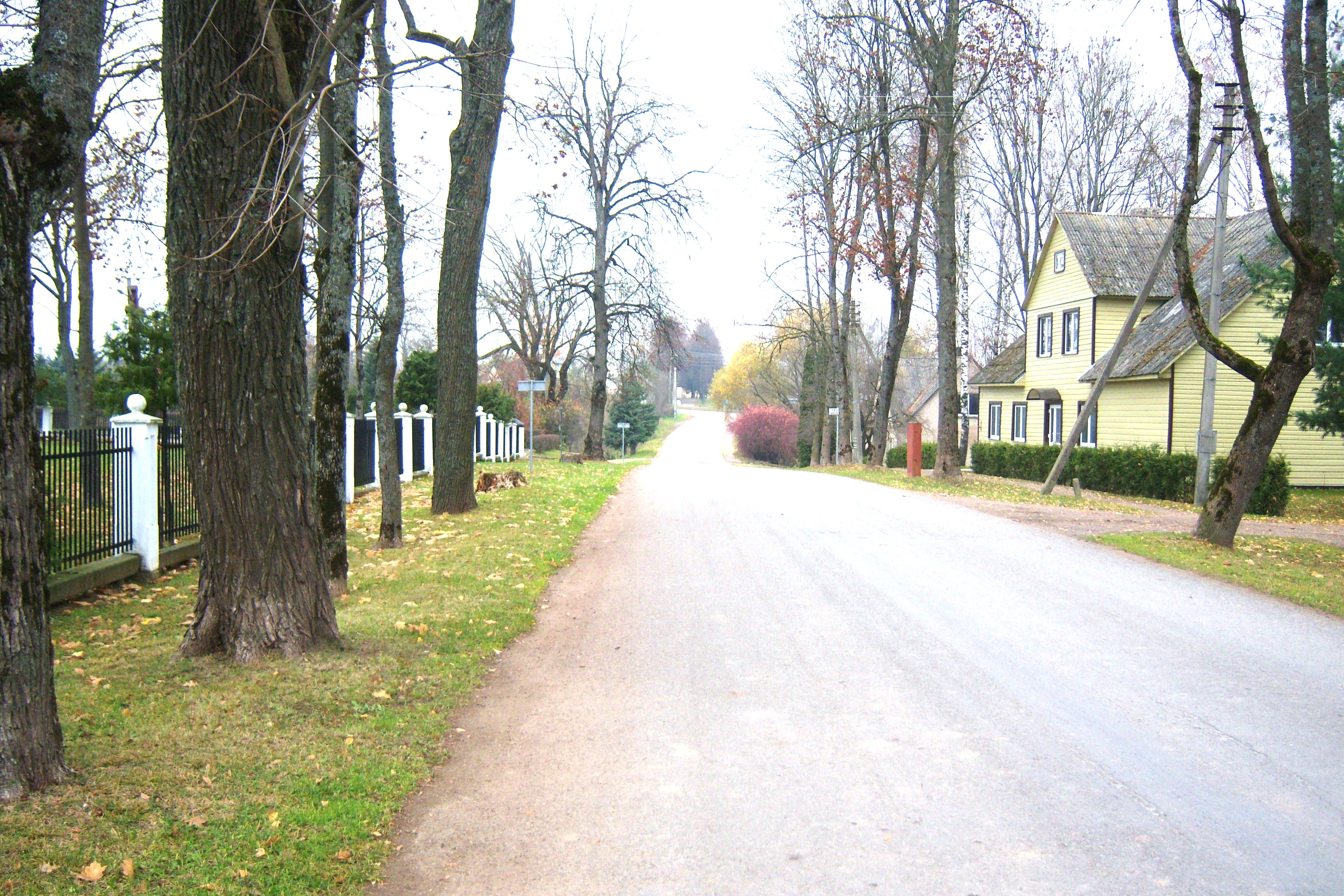
- Aušros street near the church

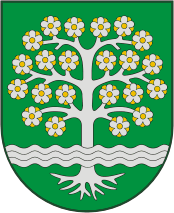
- Coat of arms

- Location of Pakuonis
- Coordinates: 54°43′30″N 24°03′10″E
- Country: Lithuania
- Ethnographic region: Suvalkija
- County: Kaunas County
- Municipality: Prienai district municipality
- Eldership: Pakuonis eldership
- Capital of: Pakuonis eldership
- First mentioned: 1744

Population (2011)
  - Total: 608
- Time zone: UTC+2 (EET)
  - Summer (DST): UTC+3 (EEST)

Pakuonis is a small town in Prienai district municipality, Lithuania. It is located near the Neman River. According to 2011 census, it has population of 608.

The village was first mentioned in 1744. The first church was built in 1792 or 1794 and the town began to grow around it. On April 23, 2004, town coat of arms, depicting a blooming apple tree, was approved by a presidential decree.

== Gallery ==
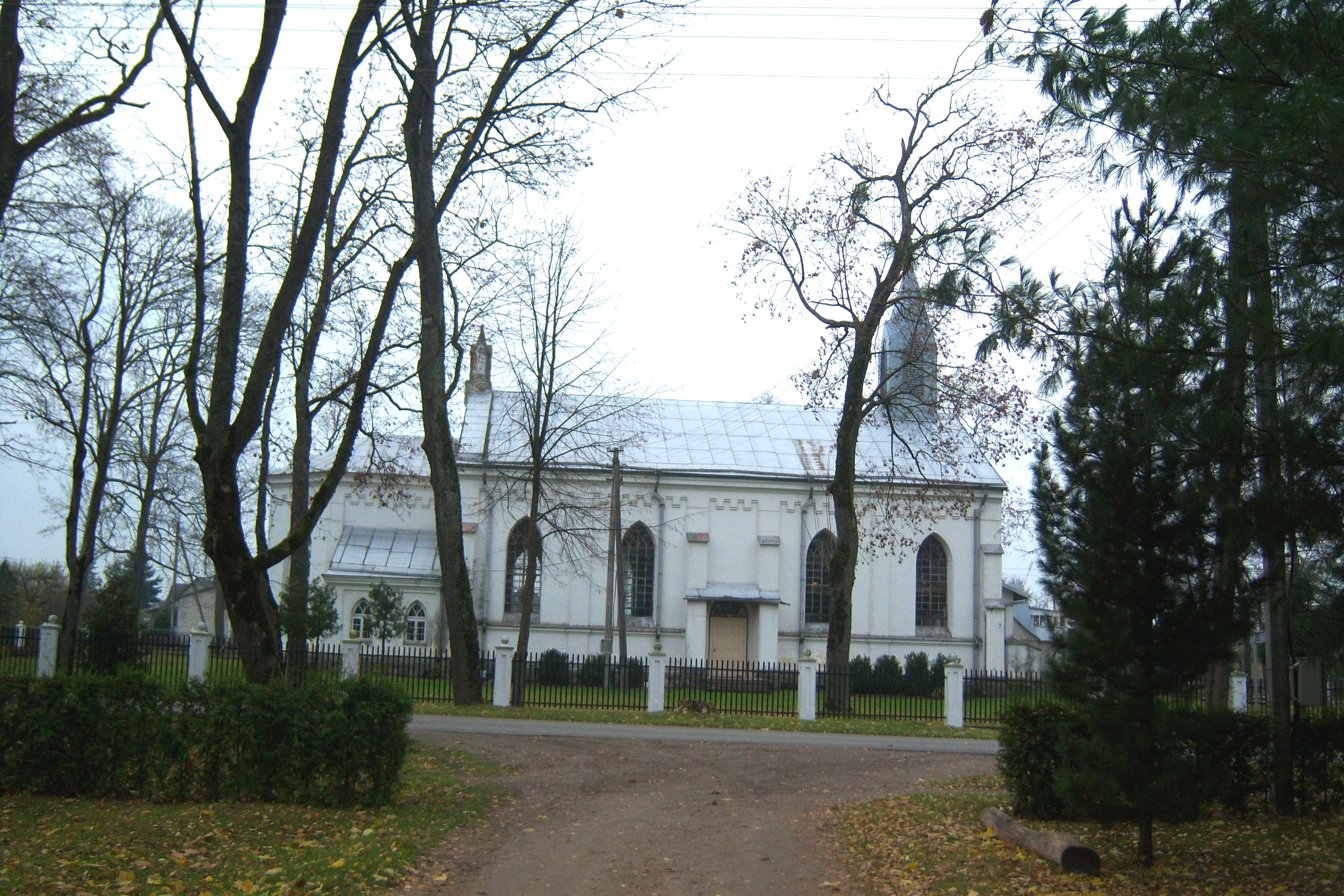
Church

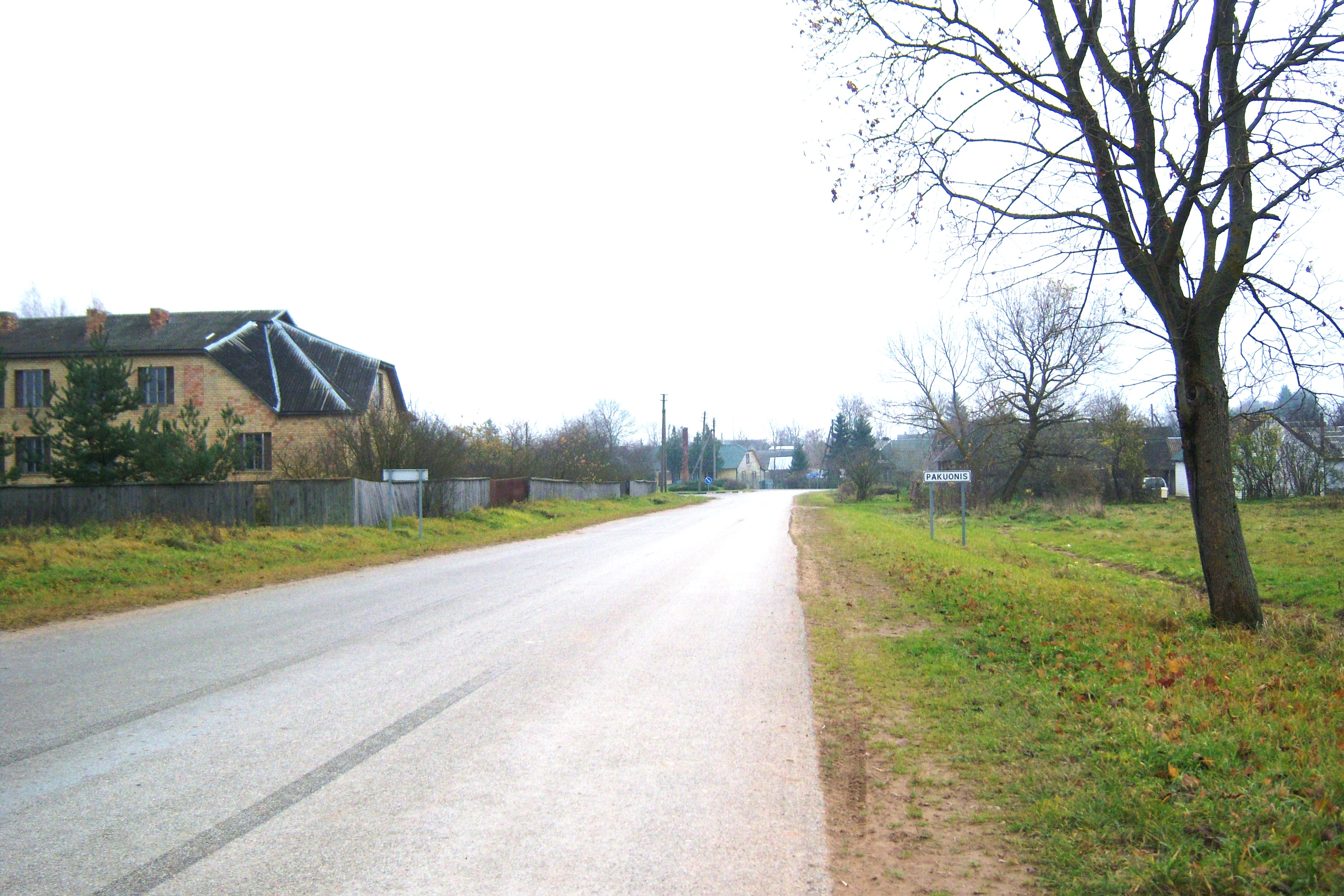
Arriving from Margininkai

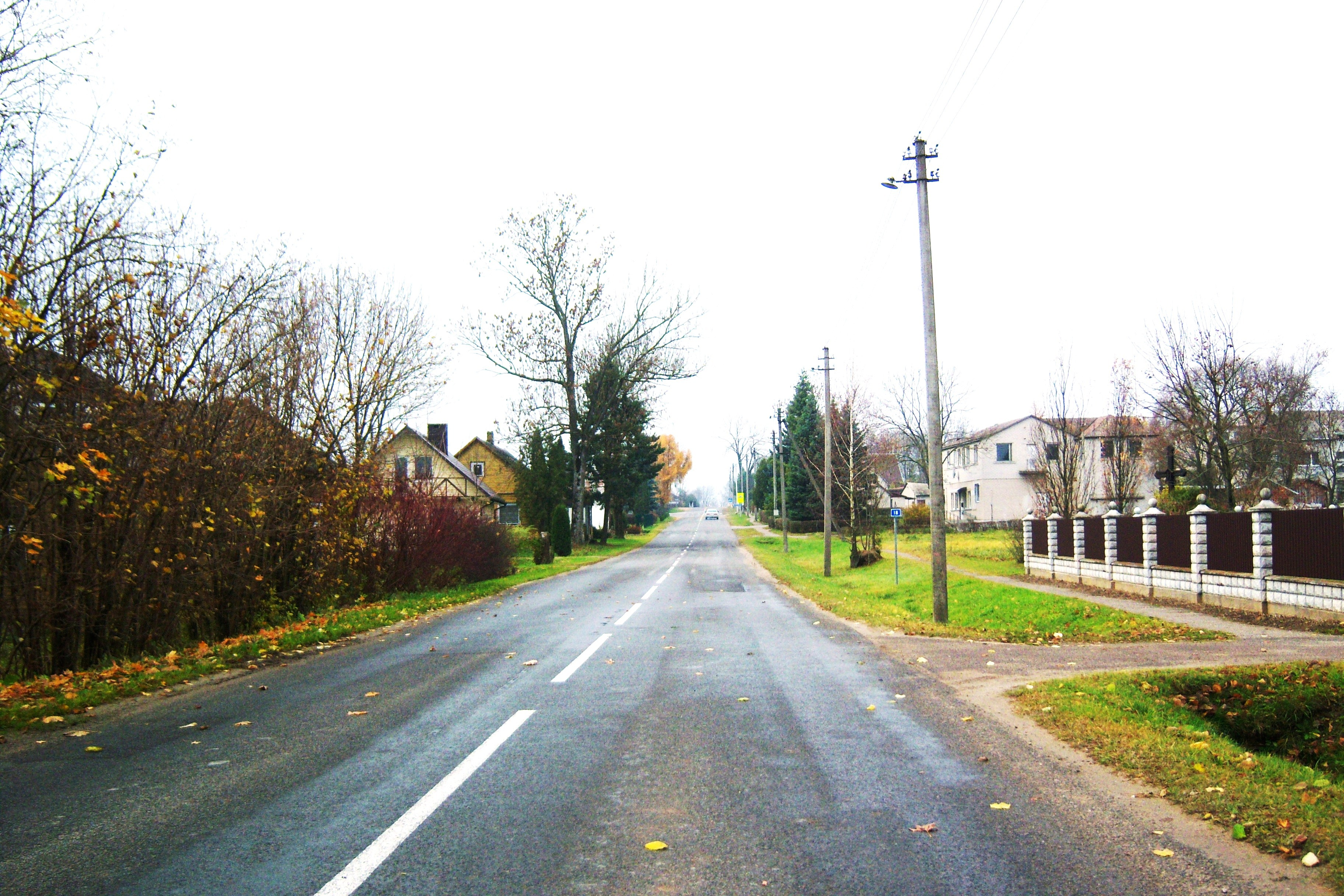
Sodų street

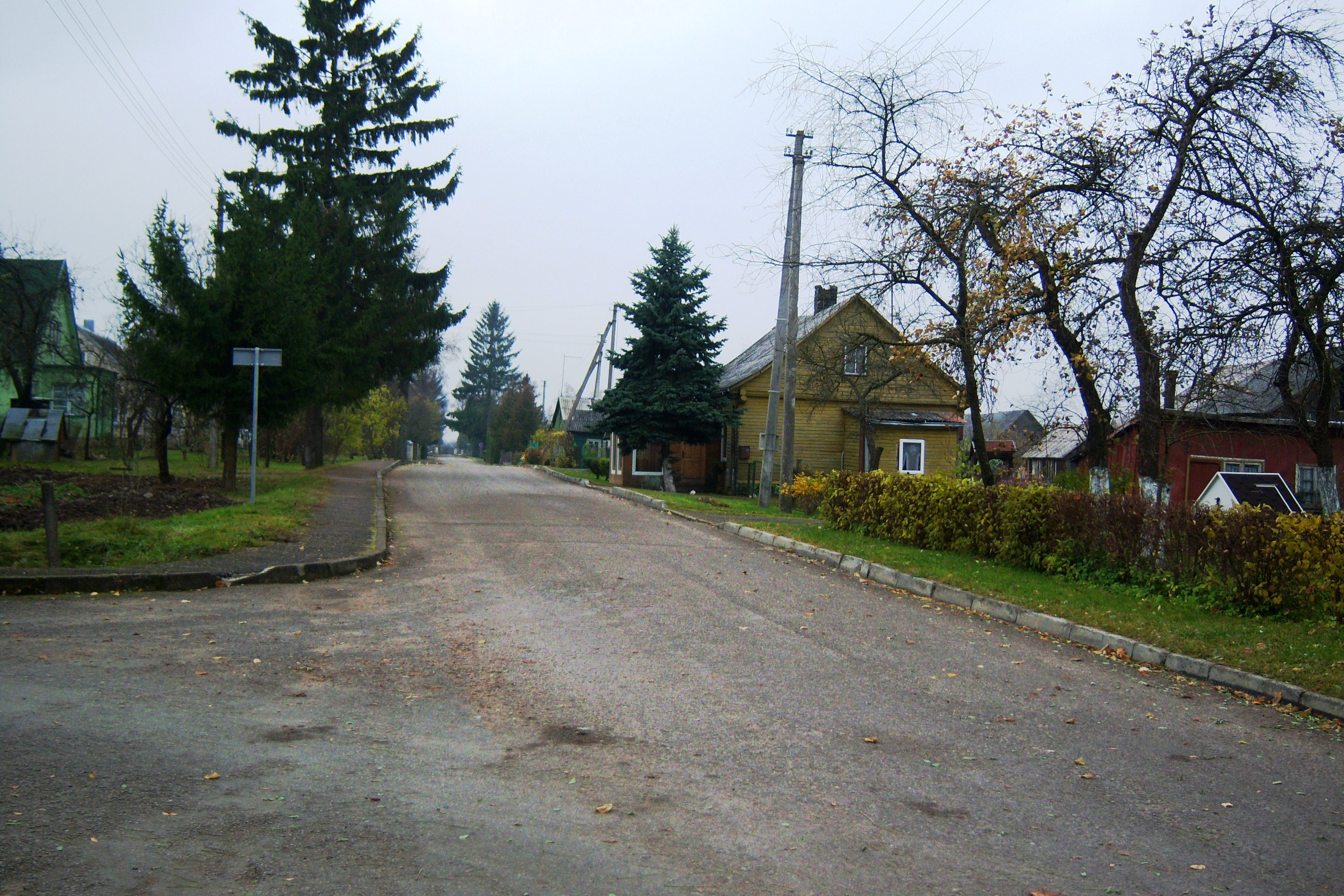
Tylos street

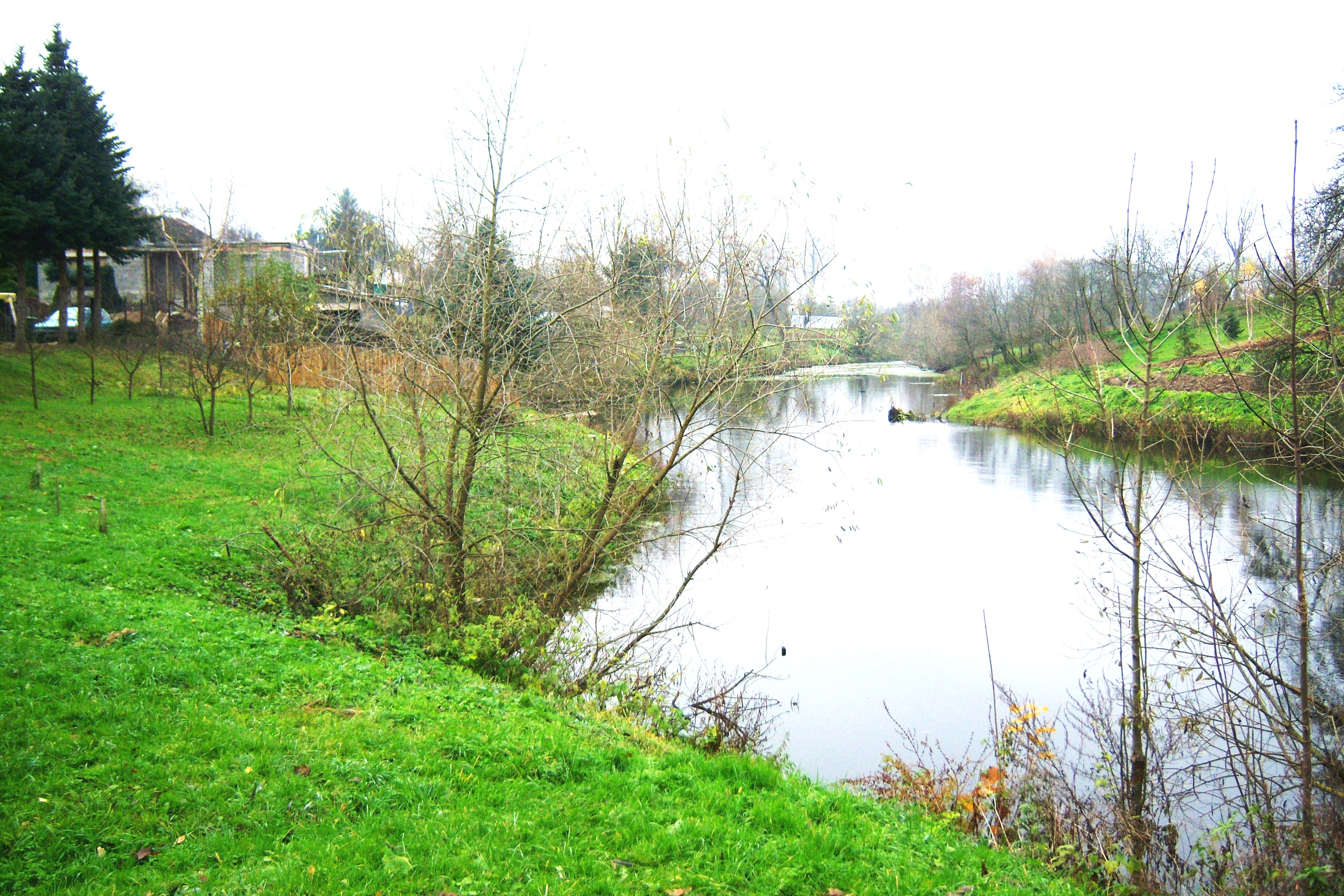
Kuonė in Aušros st.

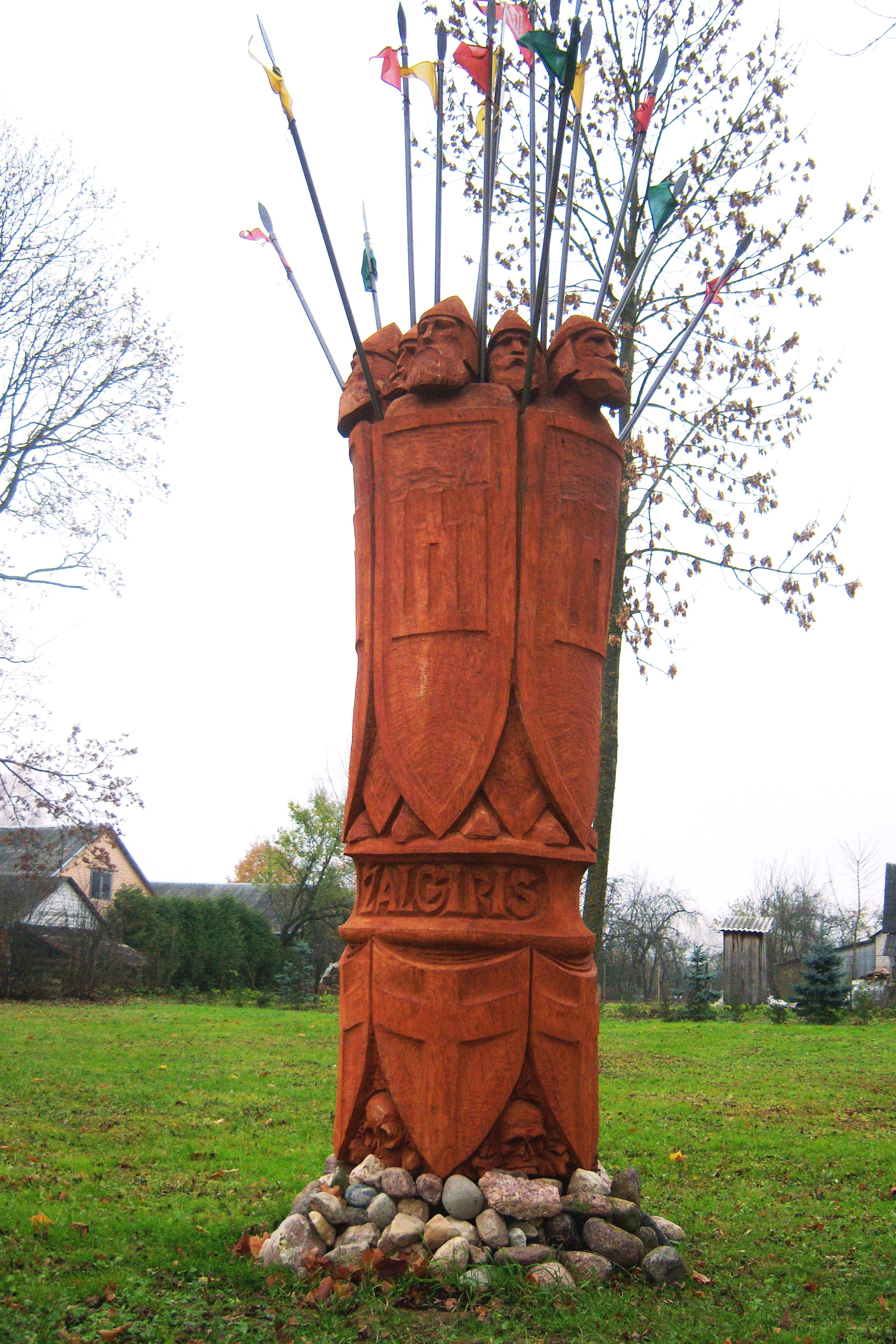
Wooden monument
