= Lekėčiai =

- Town
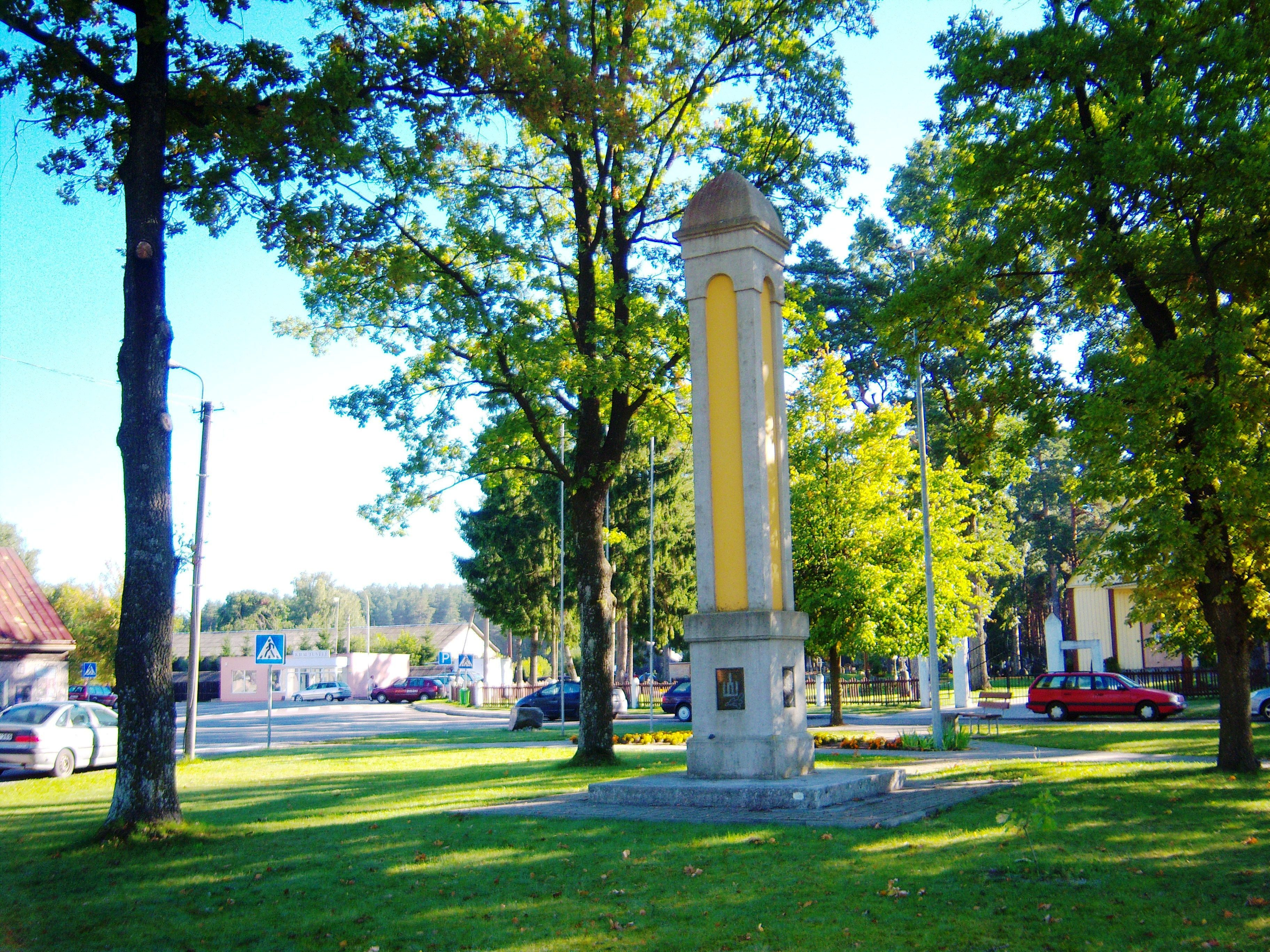

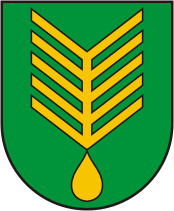
- Seal

- Location within Lithuania
- Coordinates: 54°59′0″N 23°30′0″E
- Country: Lithuania
- County: Marijampolė County

Population (2021)
  - Total: 751
- Time zone: UTC+2 (EET)
  - Summer (DST): UTC+3 (EEST)

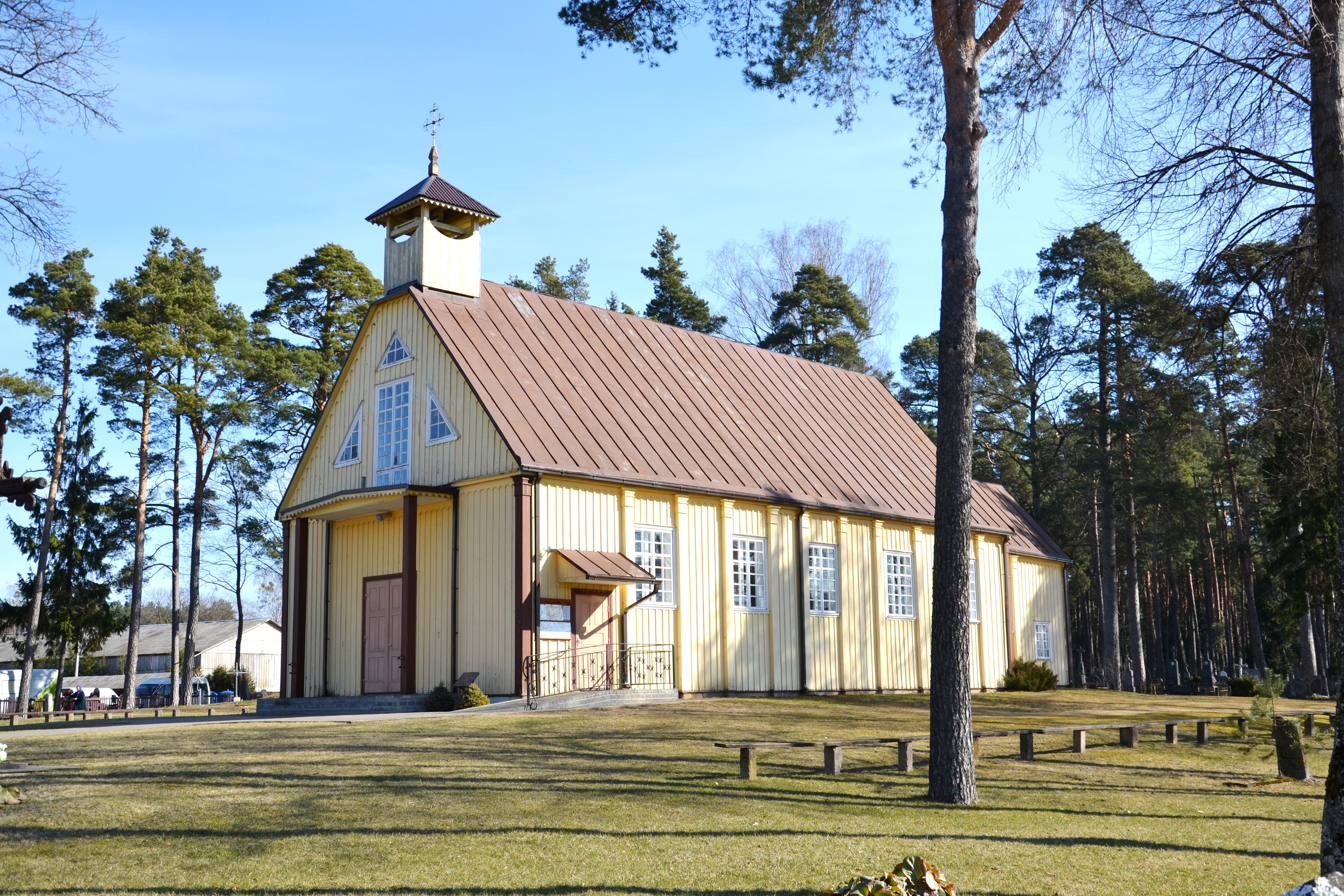
St. Casimir Church

Lekėčiai is a small town in the Šakiai District Municipality, Marijampolė County, in southwestern Lithuania.

== Location and geography ==
Lekėčiai is located in the Šakiai District Municipality, Marijampolė County, in southwestern Lithuania. It's in the center of forests, with the Rūdšilis forests to the north and the Paryžinė and Vincentavas forests to the south. The Liekė River, a tributary of the Nemunas, flows through the town.

== History ==
Lekėčiai was first mentioned in 1506, when Grand Duke Alexander Jagiellon granted the local grove to Jonas Sapiega as a reward for his service in wars against Moscow. In 1863, Lekėčiai witnessed battles between Aleksandras Andruškevičius' rebel group and between Russian Cossacks, in which 15 rebels were killed.

After World War II, local partisans established bunkers in the nearby Rūdšilis forest, and resistance leader Julijonas Būtėnas was killed there in 1951.

== Demographics ==
According to the 2011 census, the town has a population of 848 people. By the 2021 census, this number had declined slightly to 751 residents, representing a modest decrease of 1.2% over the decade. The town covers an area of 1.864 square kilometers, resulting in a population density of approximately 403 people per square kilometer. The gender distribution in 2021 showed a slight female majority, with women accounting for 52.9% (397) of the population and men making up 47.1% (354).

== Culinary heritage ==
Lekėčiai is renowned for its culinary tradition, particularly the baking of baumkuchen, known as "branchie", a delicacy introduced by monks and preserved by the women of the Zanavykai region. The town's Culinary Heritage House, run by the local women's community club, offers educational programs on traditional baking, herbalism, and ancient crafts. Only a few local women still practice the traditional method of baking "branchies", passing their skills to visitors and younger generations.
