= Church of St. Lawrence, Kalnalis =

Kalnalis St. Lawrence’s Church
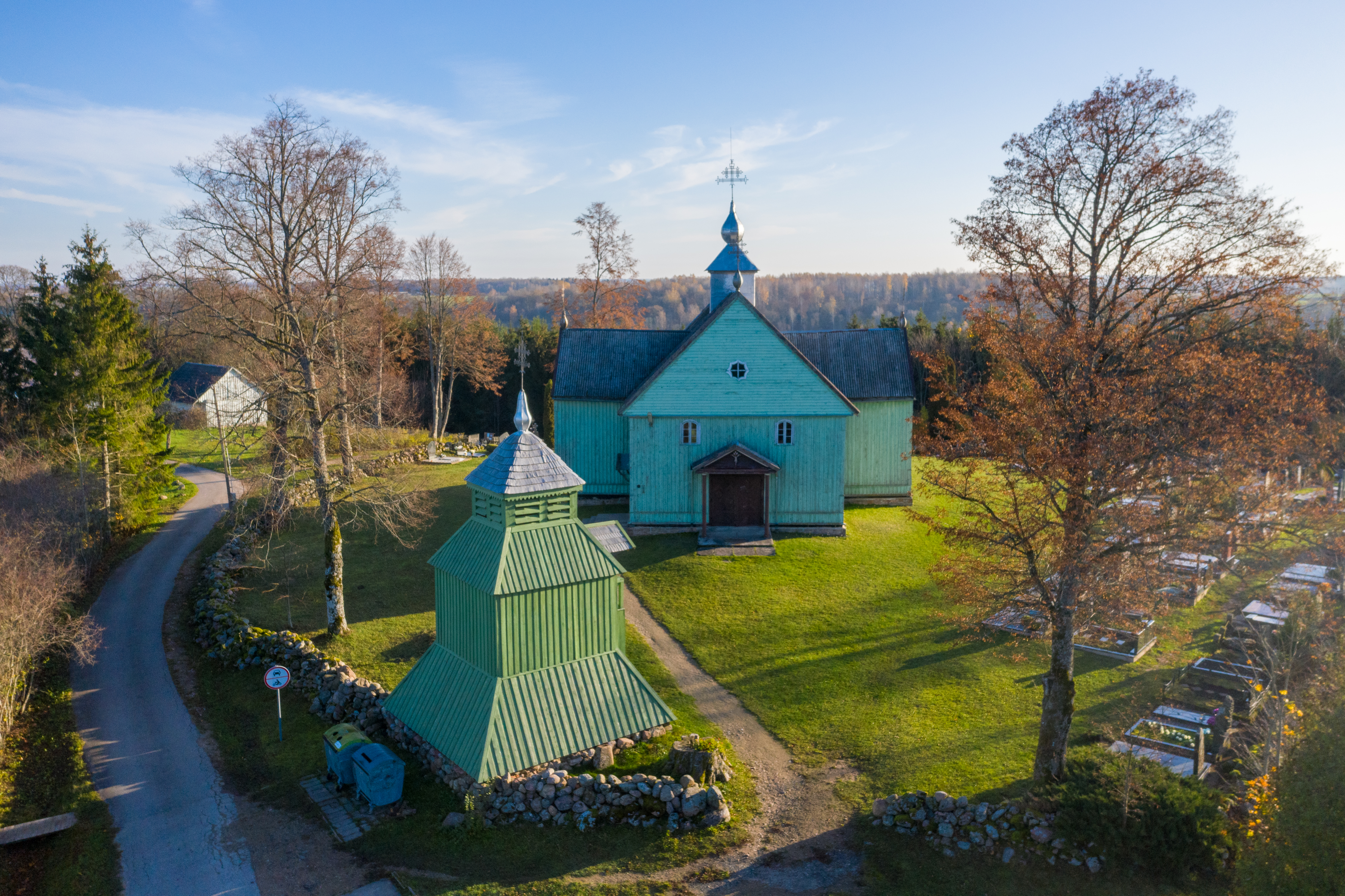
- Interactive map of the Kalnalis St. Lawrence’s Church area

General information
- Type: Church
- Location: Kalnalis, Lithuania
- Coordinates: 56.015554°N 21.540569°E

Website
- www.

St. Lawrence's Church is the most important cultural object of Kalnalis Village in Telšiai Diocese, situated on the right-hand bank of the Salantas River in Lithuania. The settlement, which is surrounded by the Salantas and Kūlupis Valleys, was established at the end of the 18th century, when the Grūšlaukė landowner Ignas Oginskis built St. Lawrence's Church here in 1777. It has retained its cultural significance, not only because it is an important part of the community, but also because Bishop Motiejus Valančius was baptised here.

== History ==
In 1883 the church burned down, and a new church was immediately built in its place that has survived to this day. The church is wooden and cruciform, with a single tower and 4 corner turrets. On the western edge of the churchyard stands a rectangular pyramid-shaped three level wooden bell tower. On the south-western and northern sides, the churchyard is surrounded by a loose stone fence, and on the southeast by a masonry fence. Above the church and the bell tower, wooden openwork ornamental crosses were raised, which are monuments to the 19th century craft of cross-making.

In 1997, the church with its bell tower was incorporated into the real heritage registry.

== Gallery ==
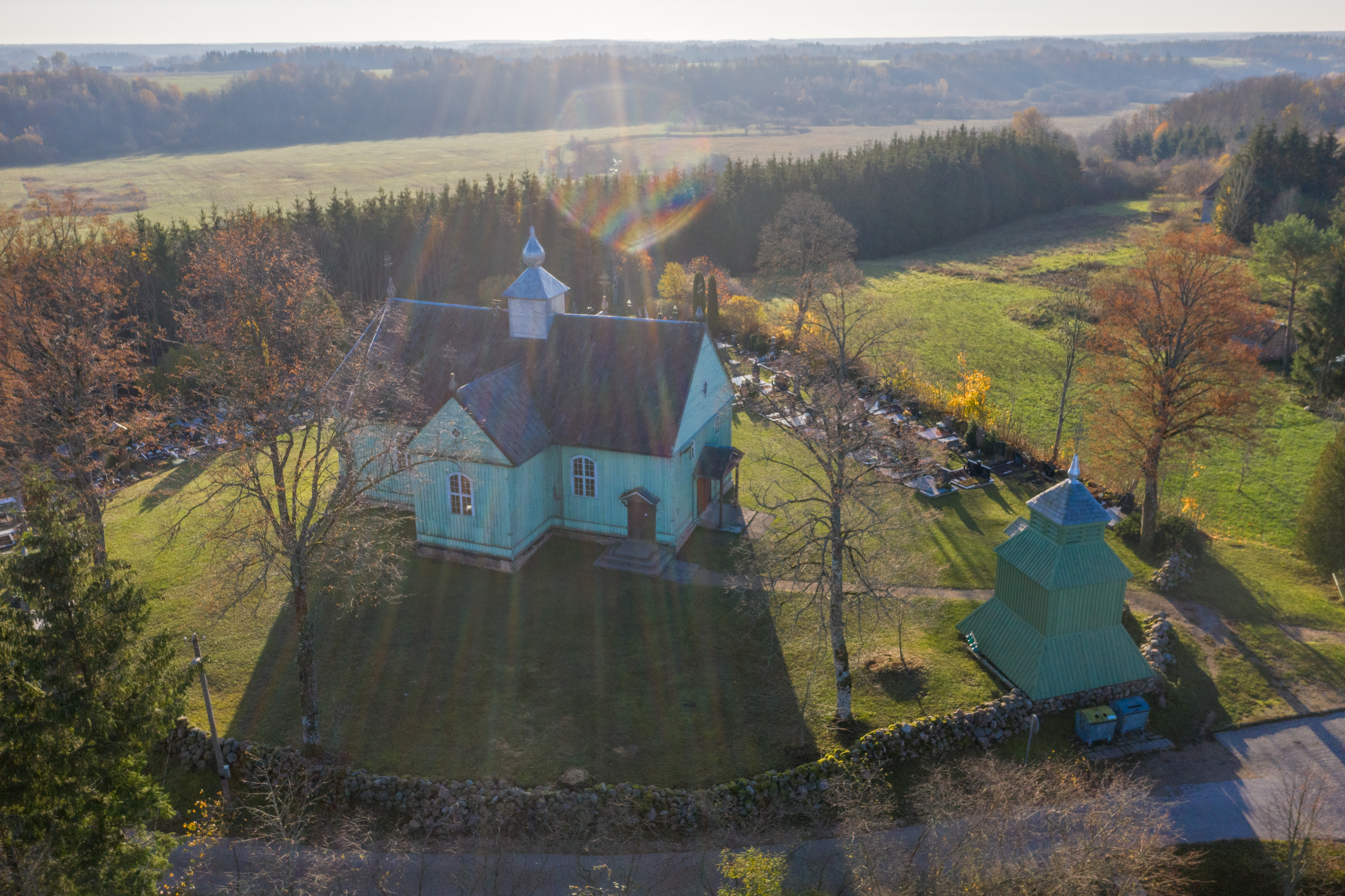

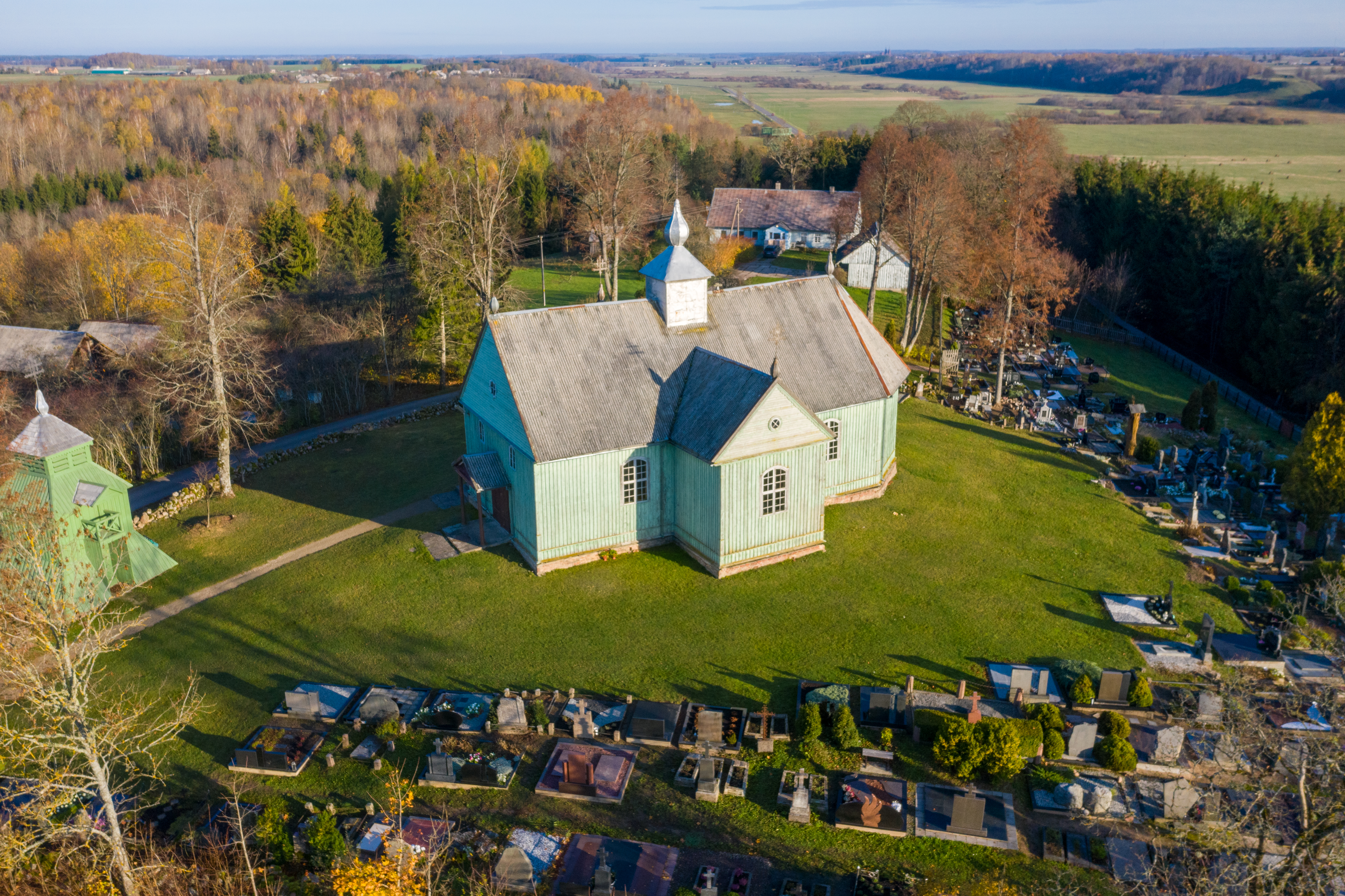

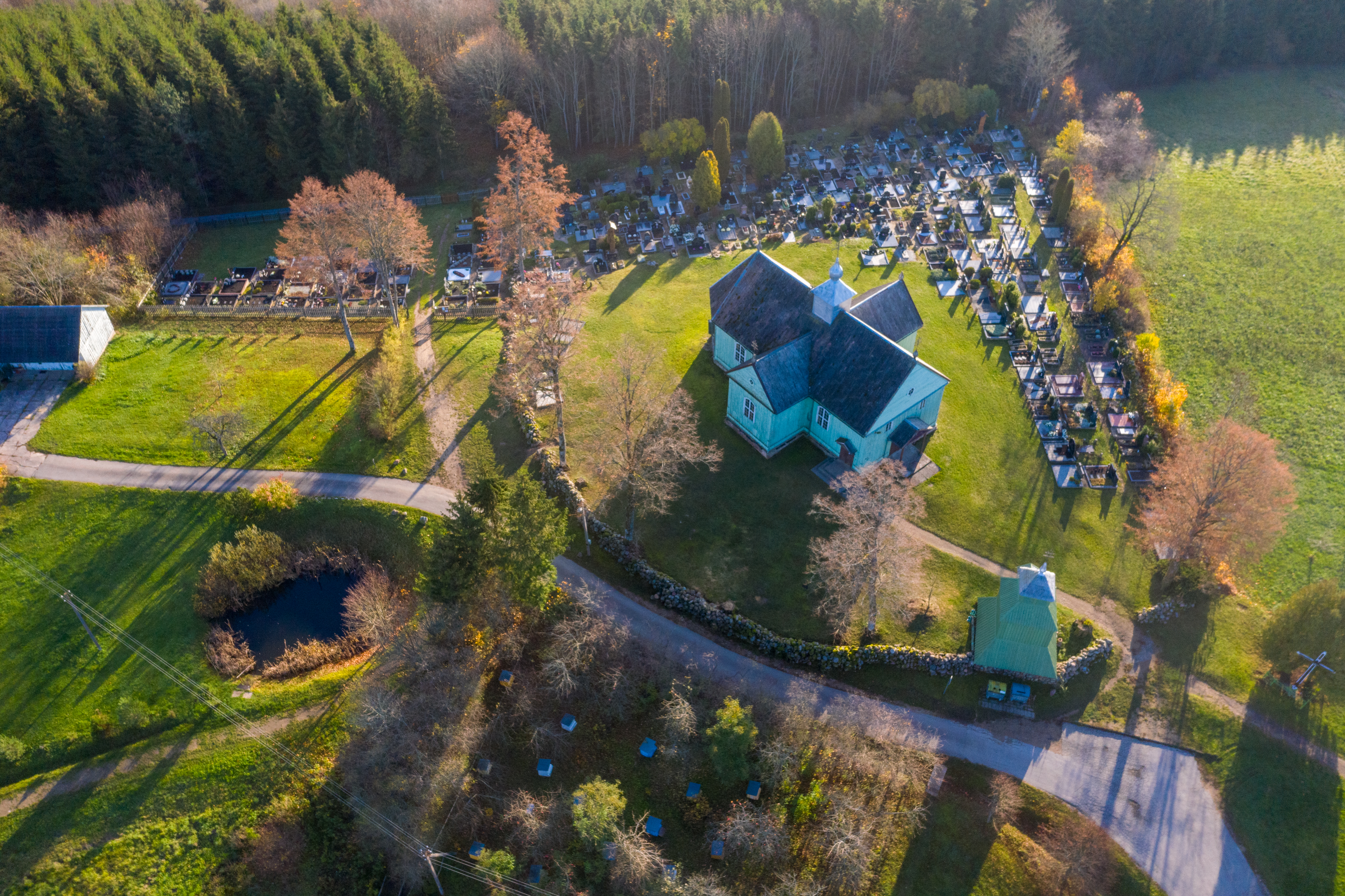

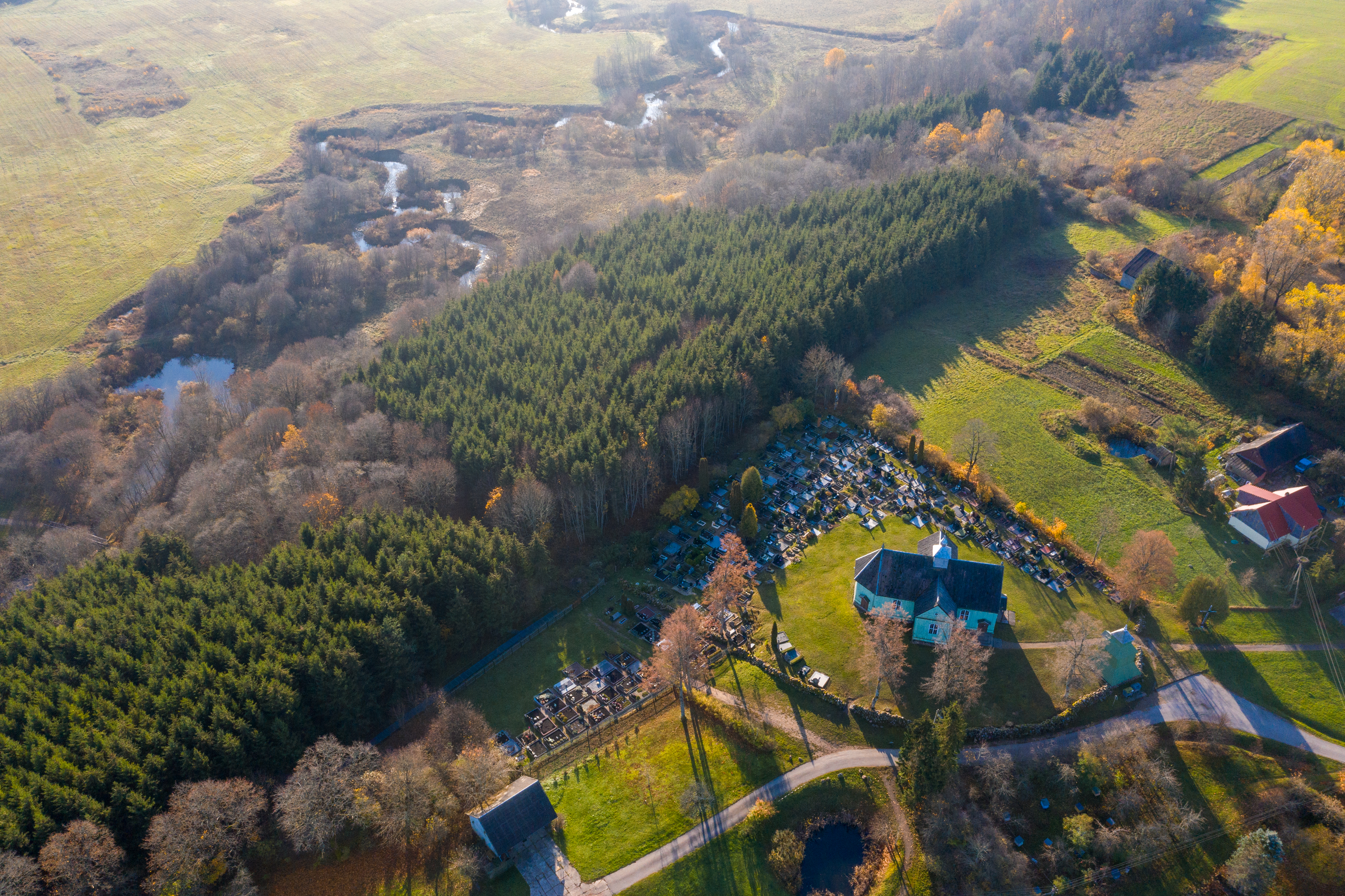

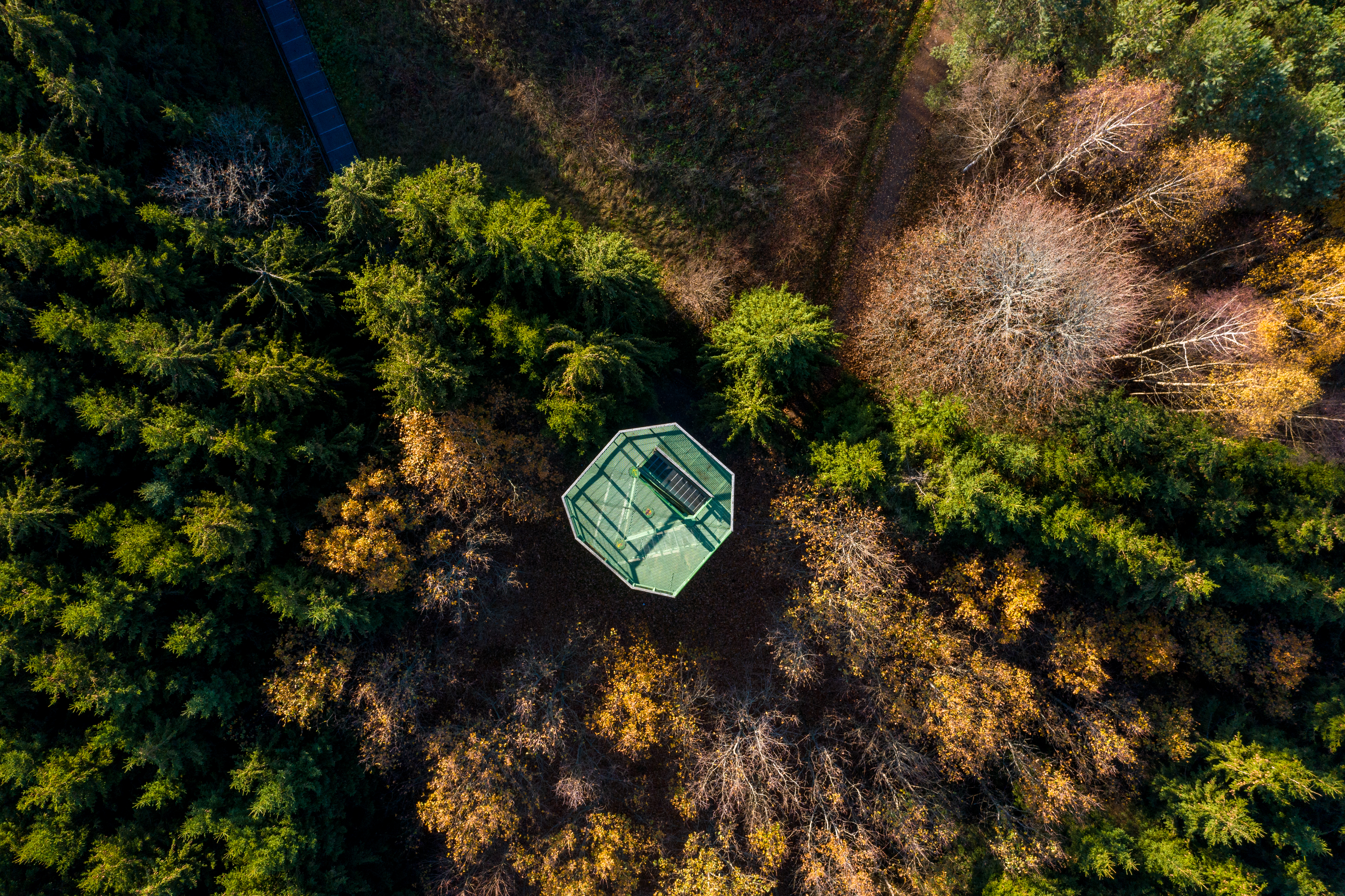
