= Assylbek Yensepov =

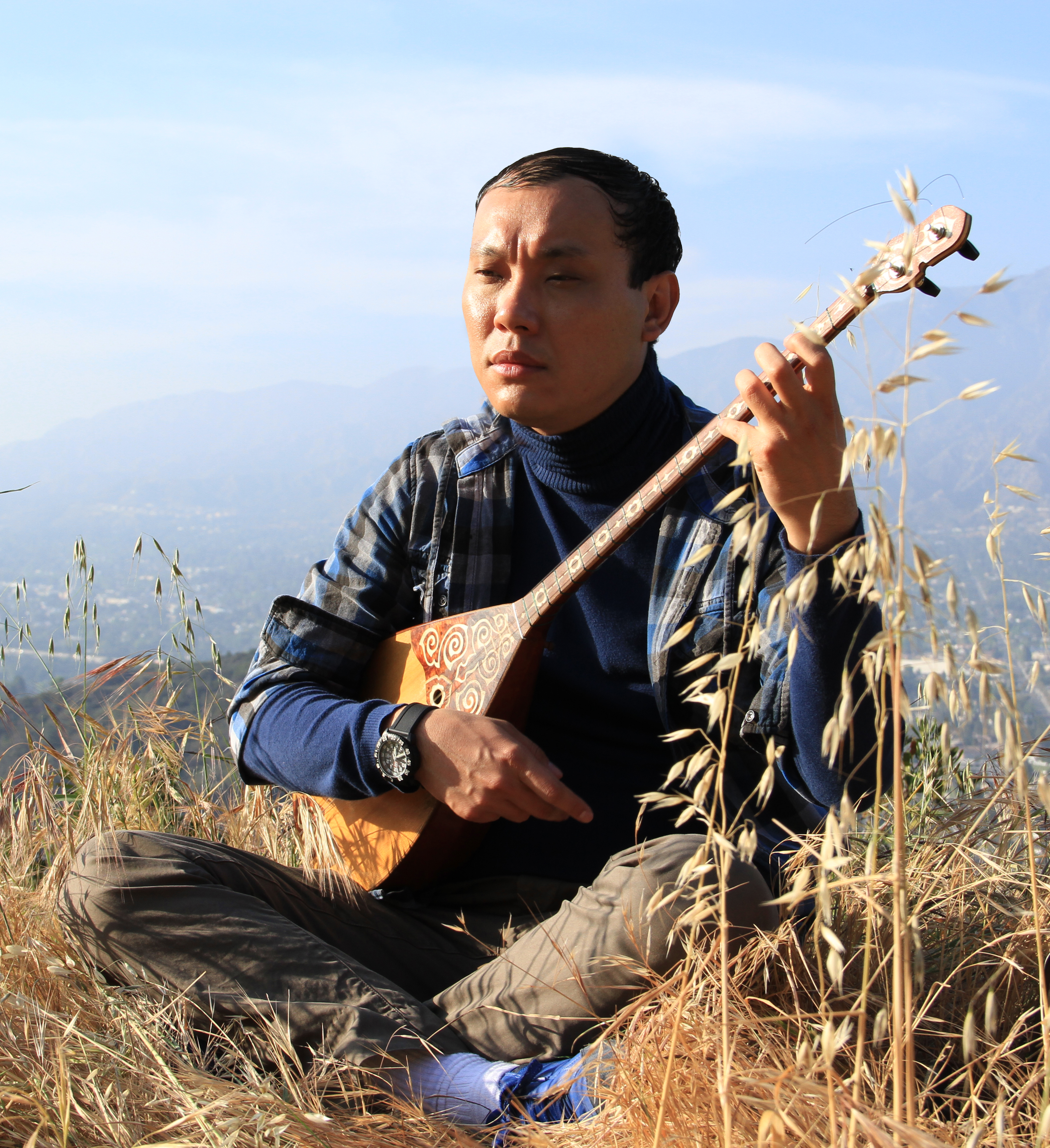
Assylbek Yensepov

Assylbek Yensepov (Kazakh: Асылбек Жасаралұлы Еңсепов, Asylbek Jasaralūly Eñsepov) is a Kazakh musician who utilizes the traditional national two string instrument, the dombyra. He is considered the first to merge the traditional Kazakh melodies to modern electronic music.

He was born in 1980 in Aktobe. His father Zhasaral, a composer, was the director of a music school; his mother Farida stayed at home. He has two brothers: Aybek (designer) and Syrym (singer). Following a typical parcours in classical musical education, he graduated from A. Zhubanova musical school and Kurmagazy national conservatory in Almaty in Kazakhstan.

== Discography ==
– Adai (2010)

1. Адай – Кұрманғазы

2. Әке толғауы – Ж.Еңсепов

3. Кең жайлау – Б. Қошмухамбетов

4. Жұмыр қылыш – Махамбет

5. Концерт 1–4 – Будашкин

6. Науаи – Дина

7. Арнау-Аллаға шүкіршілік – исп. А.Еңсепов, Р.Гайсин, С.Жолбарыс, Б.Кушкалиев

8. Хафиз – С.Жолбарыс

9. Бесконечность – Р.Гайсин

10. Нұр шашу – Ж.Еңсепов

11. Таң Нұры – С.Жолбарыс

12. Детство – Т.Мухамеджанов

13. Құралай – С.Жолбарыс
