= Atyrau =

City in Atyrau Region, Kazakhstan

Atyrau Атырау/Atyrau (Kazakh)
- City
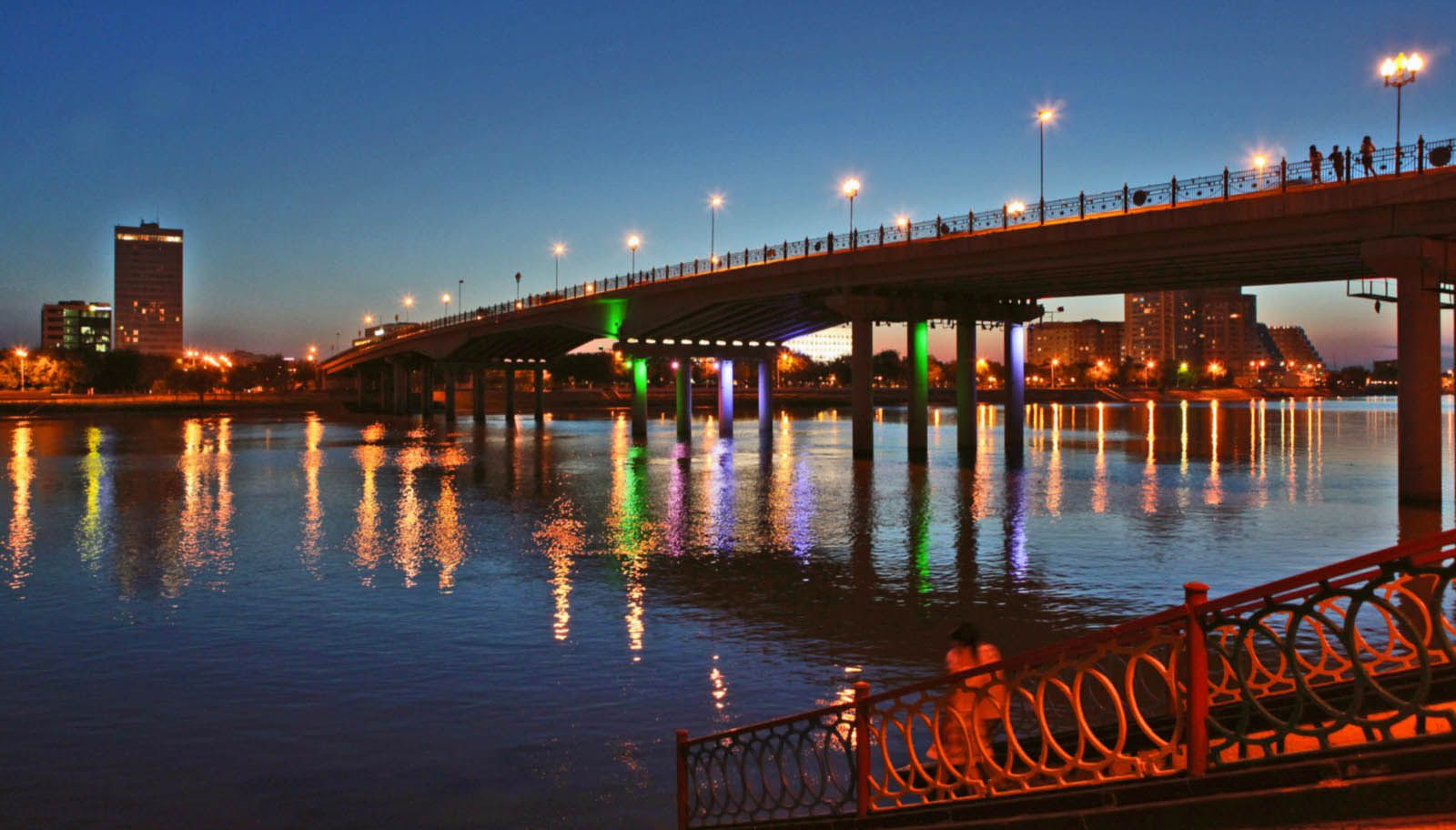
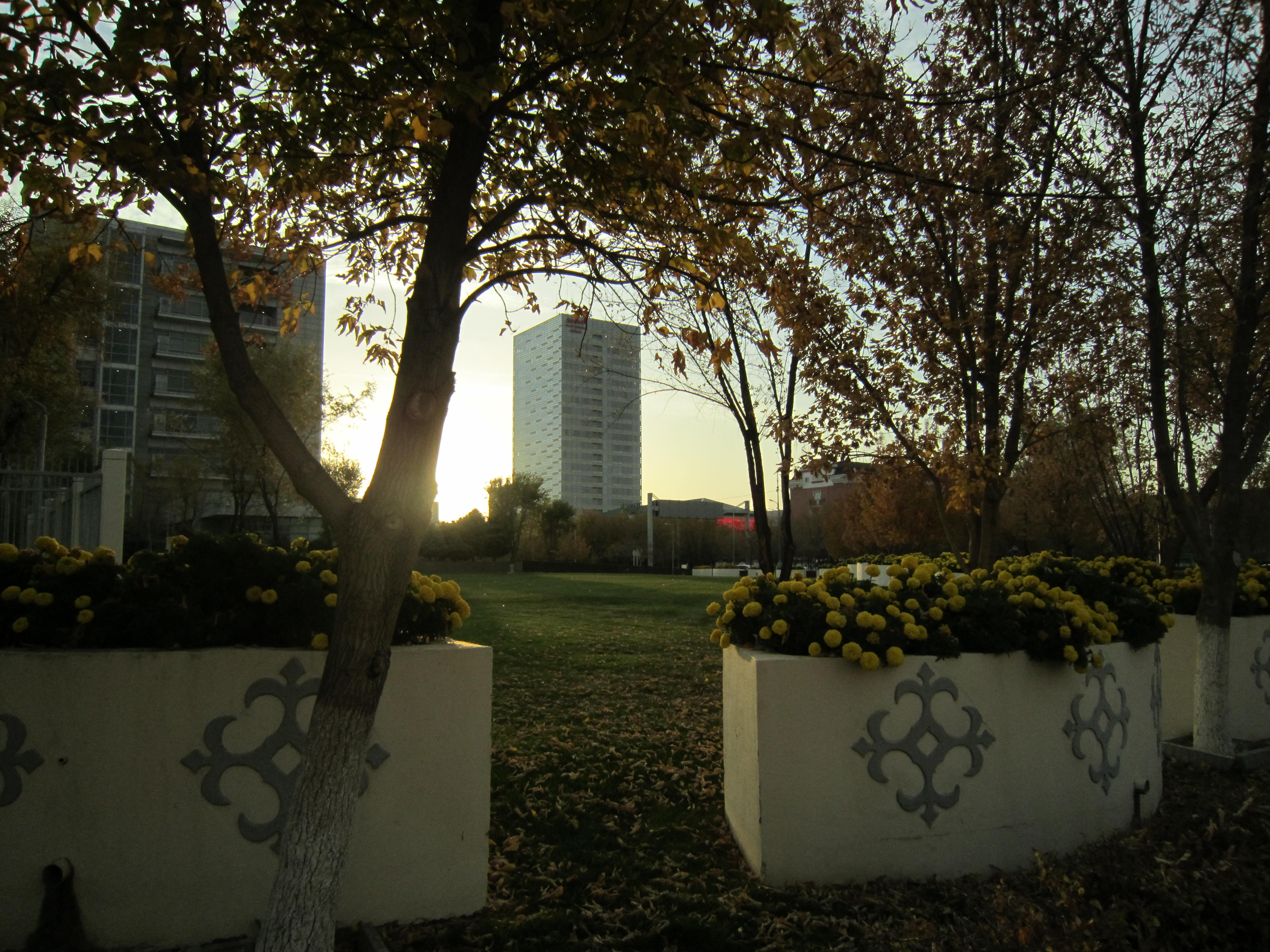
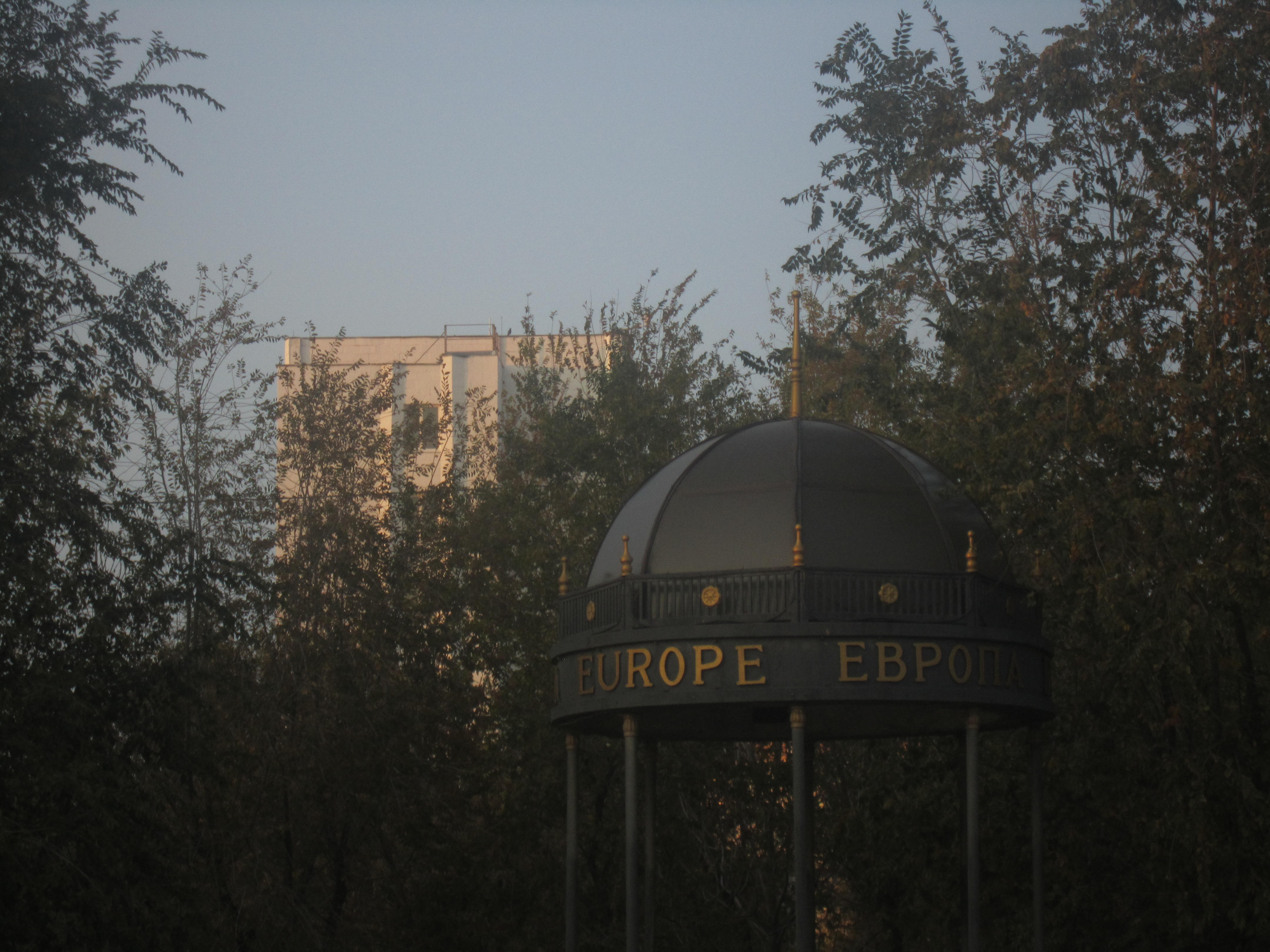
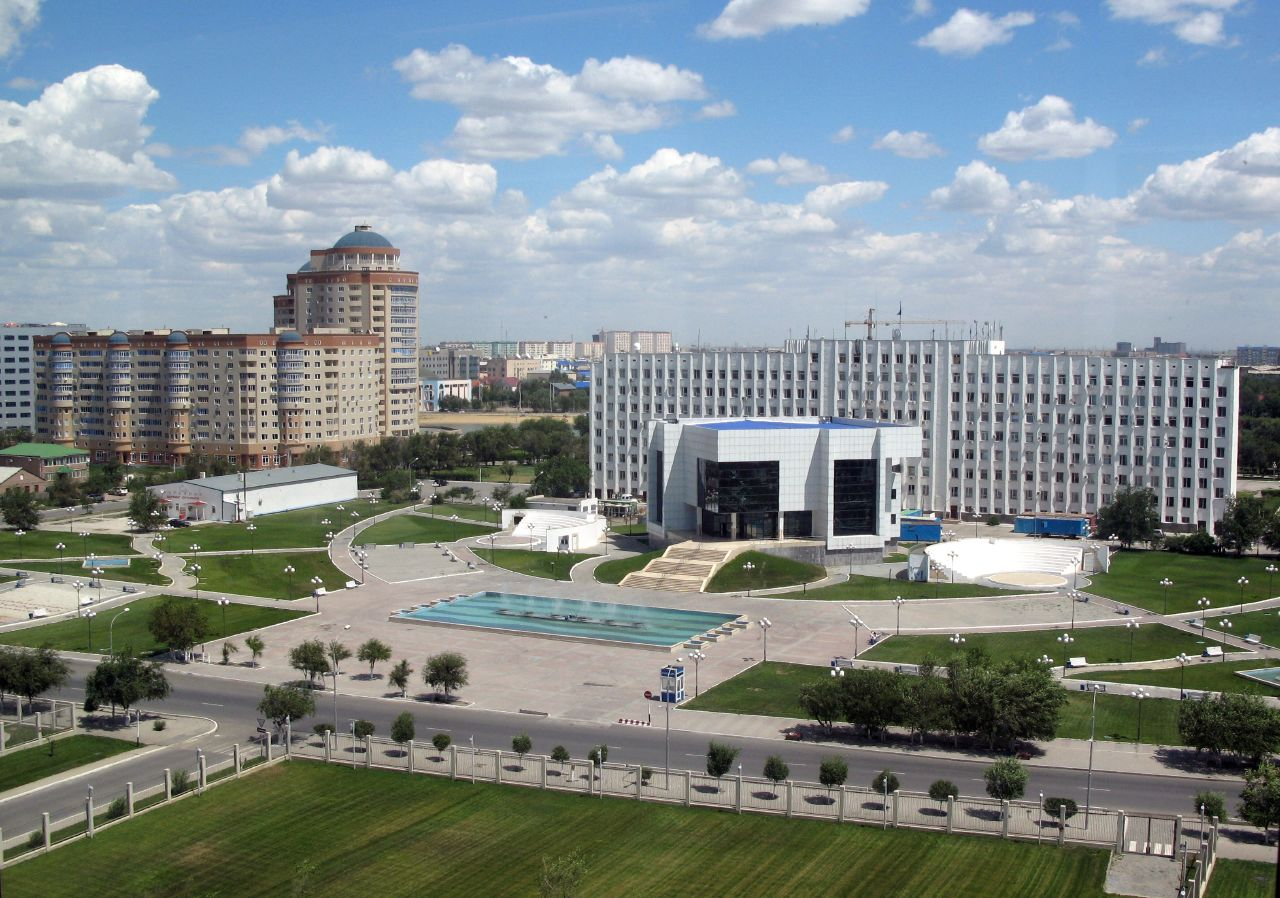
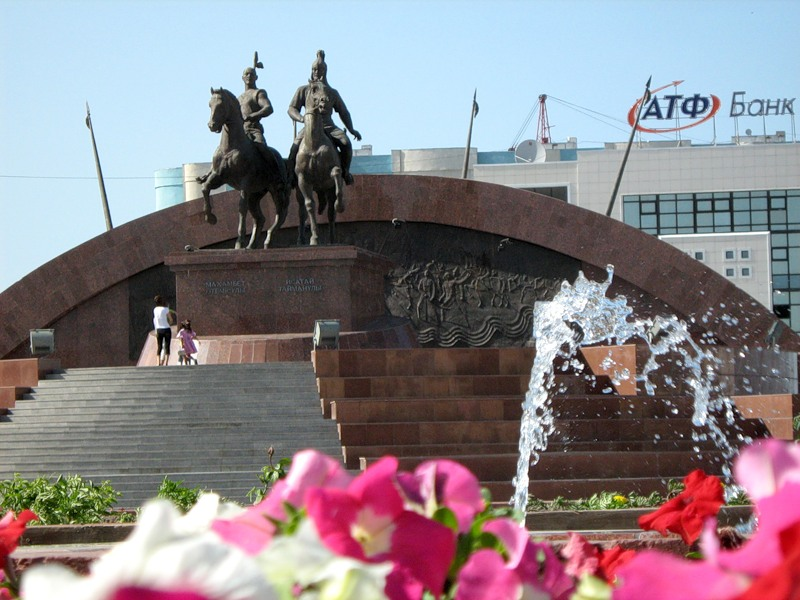
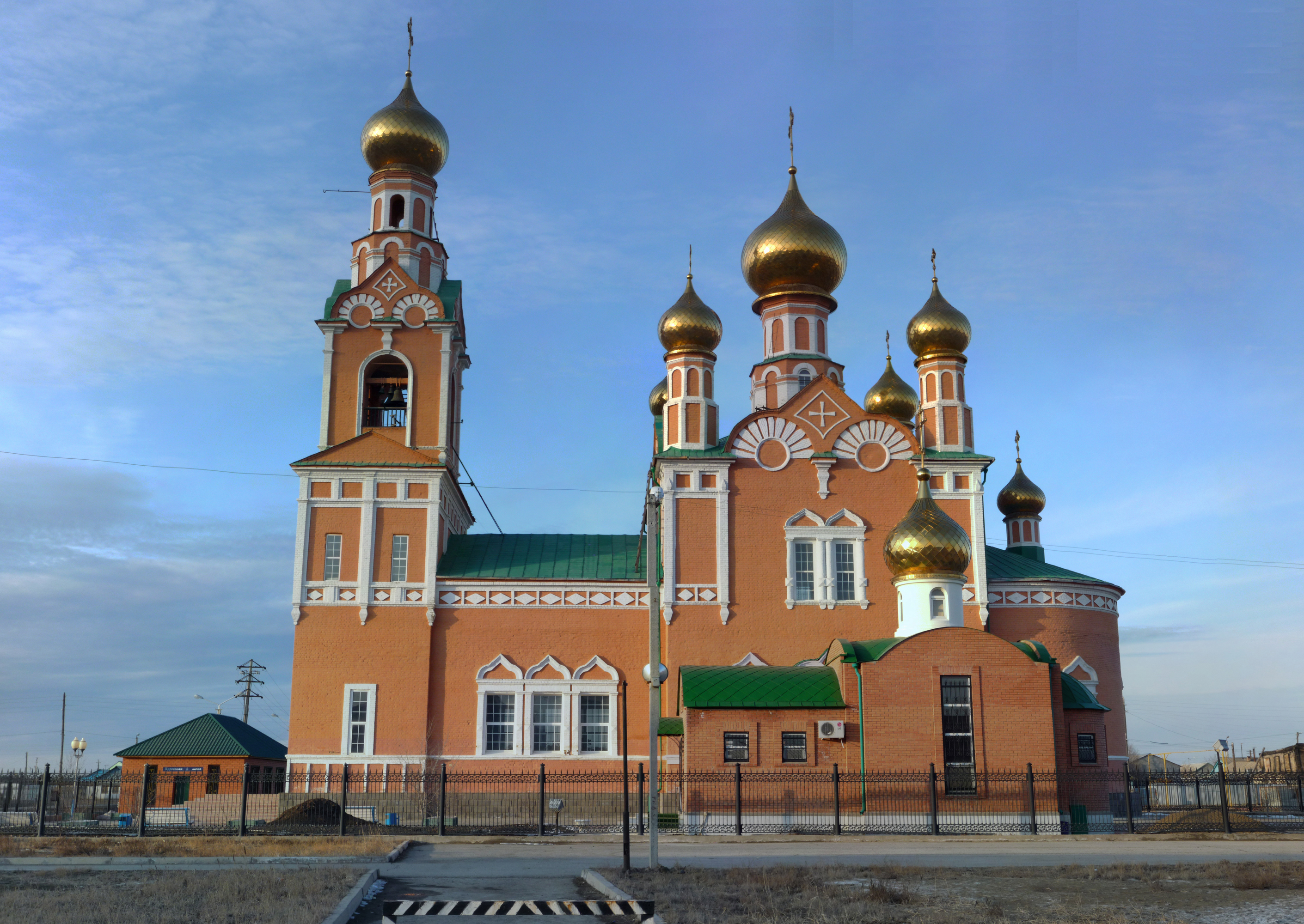
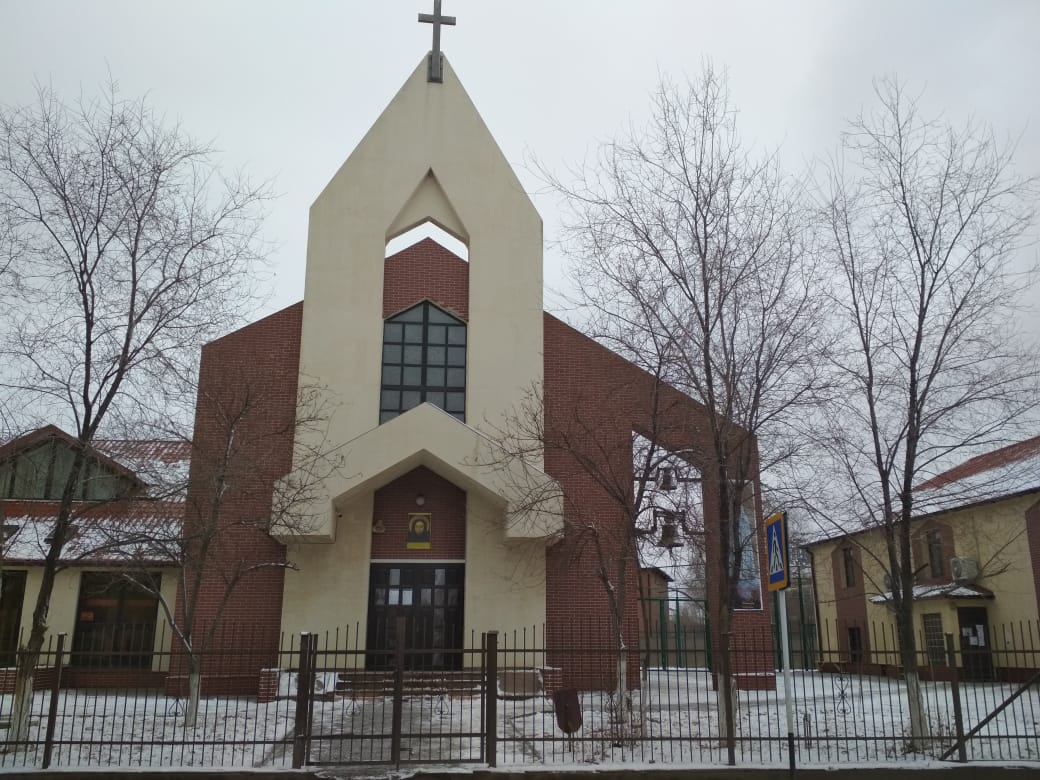
- Clockwise from top: Central Bridge above the Ural River which connects Europe and Asia during the evening; European side of Atyrau; Isatay and Makhambet Monument; An orthodox church; Catholic Cathedral The city government building; The Marriott Executive Apartment during the morning.

- Flag Seal

- Location in Kazakhstan Location in Europe Location in Asia
- Coordinates: 47°07′00″N 51°53′00″E
- Country: Kazakhstan
- Region: Atyrau Region
- Founded: 1640
- City status: 1885

Government
  - Akim (mayor): Shakir Keikin
- Elevation: −20 m (−66 ft)

Population (2024)
  - City: 404,129
  - Metro: 501,467
- Time zone: UTC+05:00 (Kazakhstan Time)
- Postal code: 060001–060011
- Area code: (+7) 7122
- Vehicle registration: E, 06
- HDI (2024): 0.856 high · 4
- GDP (nominal): 2024
  - Total: ▲$36,035 billion (KZT17,8 trillion million)
  - Per capita: ▲$89,196 (KZT 19 974,1 thousand)
- Website: atyrau.gov.kz/index.php/en/

Atyrau (UK: /ˌætɪˈraʊ, -ˈrɔː/, US: /ˌɑːtɪˈraʊ, -ˈrɔː/; Kazakh: Атырау, pronounced [ɑtəˈrɑw]; Russian: Атырау), known until 1991 as Guryev (Russian: Гурьев), is a city in Kazakhstan and the capital of Atyrau Region. Atyrau is a transcontinental city, at the mouth of the Ural River on the Caspian Sea, between Europe and Asia, 2,700 kilometres (1,700 miles) west of Almaty and 351 kilometres (218 miles) east of the Russian city of Astrakhan.

Atyrau is famous for its oil and gas industries. It has a population of 355,117 as of 2020. It is predominantly made up of Kazakhs, the minorities being Russians, Koreans, Tatars and Uzbeks.

== History ==
The wooden fort at the mouth of the Yaik River was founded in 1645 as Nizhny Yaitzky gorodok (literally, Lower Yaik Fort) by the Russian trader Gury Nazarov, a native of Yaroslavl, who specialized in trade with Khiva and Bukhara. The fort was plundered by the Yaik Cossacks, leading the Guryev family to rebuild it in stone (1647–62). Tsar Alexis sent a garrison of Streltsy to protect the fort from Cossack incursions. Despite these efforts, the Cossack rebel Stepan Razin held the town in 1667 and 1668. The fort gradually lost its strategic significance and was demolished in 1810. Between 1708 and 1992 the city was known as Guryev. The Kazakh name Atyrau means 'river delta'.

With the discovery of oil in the Emba River in 1892, oil would become a major industry in the Atyrau region. The first oil refinery founded in the city itself, the Atyrau Refinery, opened in 1945, known as Plant No. 441. The refinery would produce motor gasoline for the Soviet Union, and is one of Kazakhstan's top three largest oil refineries.

Atyrau would play an important role for the Soviet Union in World War II, by serving as both a connection to the frontline and as the main connection to help evacuate people and industries under threat from the war. The city would help refuel aircraft participating in the Battle of Stalingrad, as well sending 25 wagons full of gifts to the fighters. On August 14, 1942, 471-infantry artillery battalion arrived to defend the bridge crossing the Ural River, sent due to the Soviet Command believing the Nazis would try to destroy it. Atyrau would experience its first attack on September 10, 1942, as enemy aircraft dropped nickels in a fish cannery plant in the neighborhood of Zhumysker.

Under the Soviet Union, Atyrau would see a rapid amount of growth. The city would gain a railway, new residential areas, and its first bridge crossing over the Ural River. When the Soviet Union broke apart, Atyrau, known as Guryev, would regain its historical name. The city's refineries would expand even further with the discovery of more oil fields, which would bring outside investors in to the city. The Atyrau Airport was built in 1994 and is an international airport, further connecting Atyrau to the rest of the world.

== Origin of the name ==
Murzaev E. Dictionary of popular geographical terms (1984) states:

"The branched coast of a large lake or sea, on which appeared the bay and islands, the estuaries of rivers and capes. The north-eastern coast of the Caspian Sea, including its alyp, the locals still call Atyrau."

A. Nurmaganbetov and M. Khobdabayev state:

"The word atyrau, which earlier means "island", also grasps the concept of the word saga -" the mouth of the river, "and this is natural, whatever the river, at the point where it enters the ocean or the sea, its mouth branches out, and between each branch appears dry. We think that this is the main reason for joint use of Atyrau together with the "mouth of the river".

Ecological Kazakh–Russian Dictionary (2001) states:

Atyrau is a tract, a cane shoal in the mouth of the Urals.

== Geography ==
Atyrau (together with Aktau) is Kazakhstan's main harbour city on the Caspian Sea, Atyrau at the delta of the Ural River. Atyrau city is approximately 20 metres (66 feet) below sea level. The city is considered to be located both in Asia and Europe, as it is divided by the Ural River. The city is a hub for the oil-rich Caspian Depression; because of this, many oil wells have been drilled in the Tengiz Field and Kashagan Field areas. An oil pipeline runs from Atyrau to Samara, where it joins the Russian pipeline system. A separate oil pipeline runs from the Tengiz field to the Russian Black Sea port of Novorossiisk.

== Demographics ==
As of 2026, the population estimate for Atyrau is 328,616. This marks a 1.65% change from 2021.

National composition (at the beginning of 2020):

- Kazakhs – 313 534 people (88.29%)
- Russians – 29 466 people (8.30%)
- Koreans – 2 987 people (0.84%)
- Tatars – 1 934 people (0.54%)
- Uzbeks – 1 320 people (0.37%)
- Ukrainians – 709 people (0.20%)
- Karakalpaks – 700 people (0.20%)
- Azerbaijanis – 510 people (0.14%)
- Germans – 406 people (0.11%)
- Karachais – 357 people (0.10%)
- Dargins – 229 people (0.06%)
- Belarusians – 210 people (0.06%)
- Bulgarians – 197 people (0.06%)
- Others – 2 558 people (0.72%)

In total – 355,117 people.

== Climate ==
Atyrau's climate is semi-arid (Köppen climate classification BSk), just shy of being classified as arid (Köppen climate classification BWk), with hot summers and cold winters. Precipitation is low throughout the year. Snow is common, though light in winter. The lowest temperature on record is −37.9 °C (−36.2 °F), recorded in 1909, and the highest temperature is 44.6 °C (112.3 °F), recorded in August 1940. It is much more continental than areas further west on the European continent, with summers characterized by temperatures averaging 33 °C (91 °F) and lack of precipitation, resembling continental hot-summer mediterranean climates, and subarctic winters with little snow but with chilling temperatures. These vast temperature swings are more comparable to Siberia and the North American plains.

The unofficial record high temperature is 50 °C (122 °F) on 4 July 1911, which would be the highest temperature recorded in Kazakhstan.

Climate data for Atyrau (1991–2020, extremes 1881–present)
Month	Jan	Feb	Mar	Apr	May	Jun	Jul	Aug	Sep	Oct	Nov	Dec	Year
Record high °C (°F)	10.5 (50.9)	15.0 (59.0)	26.3 (79.3)	34.5 (94.1)	38.9 (102.0)	42.8 (109.0)	42.7 (108.9)	44.6 (112.3)	40.1 (104.2)	29.6 (85.3)	20.0 (68.0)	11.9 (53.4)	44.6 (112.3)
Mean daily maximum °C (°F)	−3.0 (26.6)	−1.3 (29.7)	6.8 (44.2)	17.3 (63.1)	25.3 (77.5)	31.3 (88.3)	33.7 (92.7)	32.2 (90.0)	24.7 (76.5)	15.6 (60.1)	5.3 (41.5)	−1.2 (29.8)	15.6 (60.1)
Daily mean °C (°F)	−6.4 (20.5)	−5.6 (21.9)	1.9 (35.4)	11.6 (52.9)	19.4 (66.9)	25.1 (77.2)	27.4 (81.3)	25.6 (78.1)	18.4 (65.1)	10.2 (50.4)	1.5 (34.7)	−4.2 (24.4)	10.4 (50.7)
Mean daily minimum °C (°F)	−9.3 (15.3)	−9.0 (15.8)	−2.1 (28.2)	6.5 (43.7)	13.7 (56.7)	18.8 (65.8)	21.0 (69.8)	19.2 (66.6)	12.7 (54.9)	5.5 (41.9)	−1.6 (29.1)	−7.0 (19.4)	5.7 (42.3)
Record low °C (°F)	−37.9 (−36.2)	−37.4 (−35.3)	−32.3 (−26.1)	−12.3 (9.9)	−2.3 (27.9)	2.3 (36.1)	8.1 (46.6)	4.8 (40.6)	−5.7 (21.7)	−15.7 (3.7)	−29.8 (−21.6)	−35.8 (−32.4)	−37.9 (−36.2)
Average precipitation mm (inches)	16.0 (0.63)	12.0 (0.47)	15.6 (0.61)	16.6 (0.65)	27.8 (1.09)	16.9 (0.67)	11.6 (0.46)	9.7 (0.38)	9.0 (0.35)	18.3 (0.72)	16.0 (0.63)	15.8 (0.62)	185.3 (7.30)
Average extreme snow depth cm (inches)	3 (1.2)	6 (2.4)	2 (0.8)	0 (0)	0 (0)	0 (0)	0 (0)	0 (0)	0 (0)	0 (0)	1 (0.4)	2 (0.8)	6 (2.4)
Average precipitation days (≥ 1 mm)	4.4	2.9	3.2	3.8	3.9	3.0	2.3	1.5	2.0	3.2	3.9	4.3	38.4
Average rainy days	4	4	6	8	9	7	6	5	5	8	10	6	78
Average snowy days	14	11	7	1	0	0	0	0	0	1	5	11	50
Average relative humidity (%)	84	80	74	58	50	45	45	46	52	64	80	84	64
Mean monthly sunshine hours	98	138	167	245	311	330	343	323	267	196	105	75	2,598
Mean daily sunshine hours	3.2	4.9	5.4	8.2	10.0	11.0	11.1	10.4	8.9	6.3	3.5	2.4	7.1
Source 1: Pogoda.ru.net
Source 2: NOAA (sun, 1961–1990), Deutscher Wetterdienst (daily sun 1961-1990)

== Industry ==
=== Oil industry ===
The third biggest refinery in Kazakhstan is located in Atyrau. Atyrau Refinery is operated by KazMunayGas and has a capacity of 16,600 m^{3}/day (2012). A deep oil refining complex is under construction which is the final stage of complete reconstruction of Atyrau Oil Refinery. This project is designed to process 2.4 million tons/year of raw materials (oil and vacuum gas oil). The project will increase the depth of the oil processing at the refinery by 2016 to 85%. The volume of oil refining will reach 5.5 million tons per year.

Atyrau is located near Tengiz field, which is operated in part by Chevron. Most families of Chevron employees live in Dostyk village, a compound that includes housing, recreational facilities, and an international school. Atyrau also has expatriate populations working for Agip, ExxonMobil, Royal Dutch Shell, and ConocoPhillips.

=== Environmental problems ===
As a result of the oil industry, the air in the city is polluted with toxic hydrogen sulfide gas. The air in the city was found to regularly exceed the maximum permissible concentration and constantly had a 'rotten eggs' smell.

== Education ==
There are three major institutions of higher education in Atyrau (all state-owned): Atyrau Institute of Engineering and Humanities, Atyrau University of Oil and Gas named after Safi Utebayev, and Atyrau University named after Khalel Dosmukhamedov.

== Sports ==
The city is home to the basketball team BC Barsy Atyrau. The team competes in the international FIBA Asia Champions Cup and the Kazakhstan Basketball Championship. It plays its home games at the Sports and Recreation complex Atyrau. There is a multi-use stadium called Munaishy Stadium, which is mostly used for football matches and it is home to the football club FC Atyrau. The stadium's capacity is 8,900 spectators.

== Transportation ==
=== Air ===
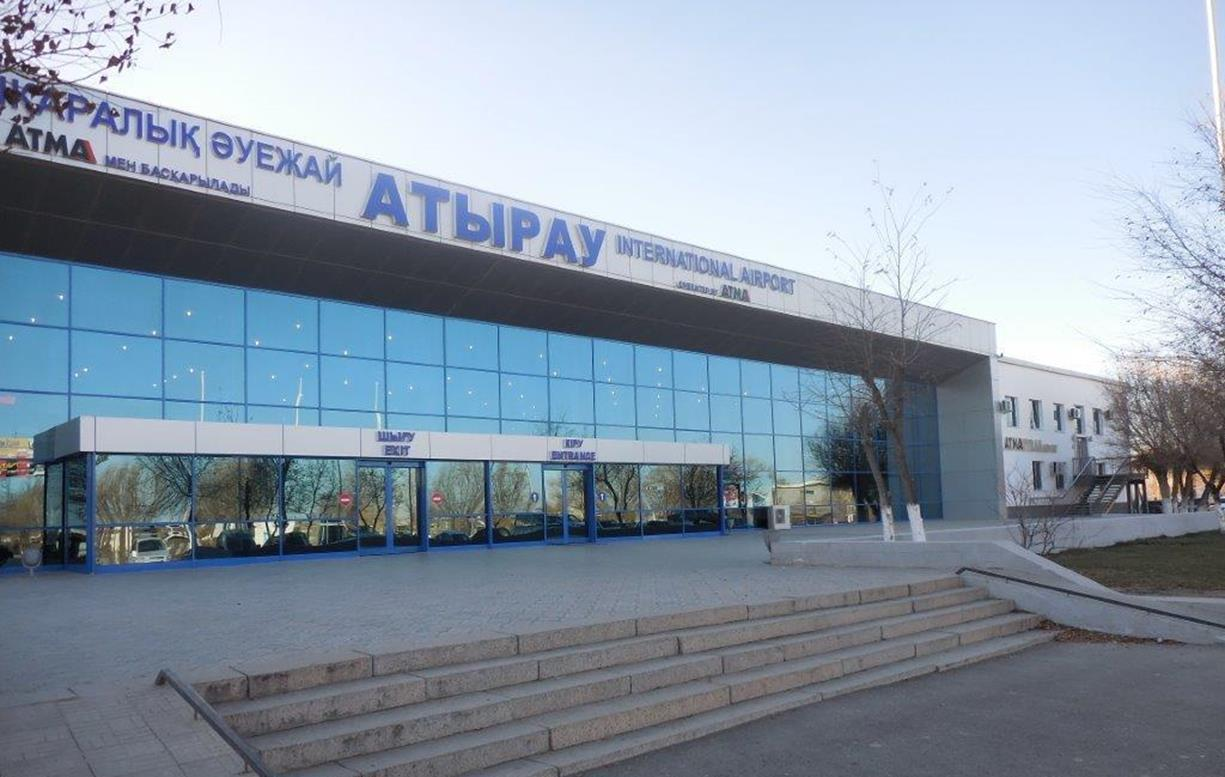
Entrance to the Atyrau Airport

Atyrau Airport (IATA: GUW, ICAO: UATG) serves the city of Atyrau. The airport is located 8 km northwest of Atyrau. The airport hosts 6 airlines, mostly operating domestic flights, and is the focus city of the flag carrier airline Air Astana. In 2019, it was the 5th busiest airport in Kazakhstan, as 937,032 people had passed the airport in that year. There are some international destinations, such as flights to Moscow, operated by Aeroflot, Amsterdam and Istanbul, both operated by Air Astana.

=== Railway ===
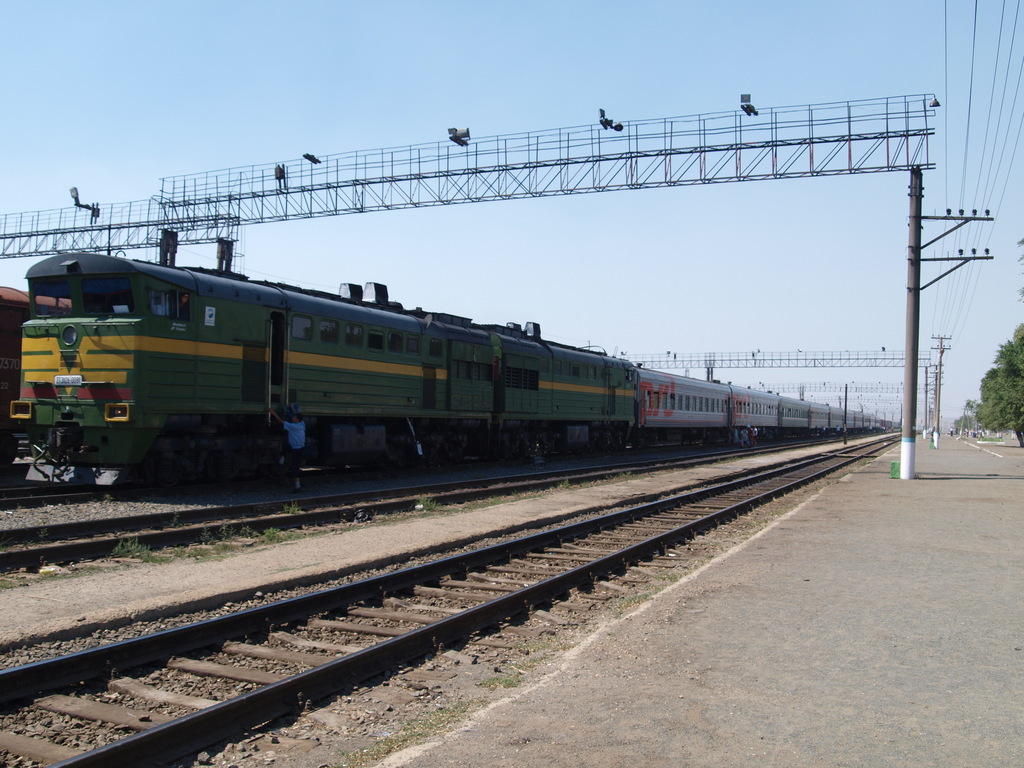
Train from Moscow to Almaty staying at the Atyrau Railway Station

There is a railway station, located northeast of Atyrau. There are mainly domestic routes, such as routes to large cities Almaty, Aktobe and Astana, but there's also international routes, such as a route to Russian cities Astrakhan, Saratov, Moscow, Volgograd and Tajikistani cities Kulob, Khujand, Dushanbe and Uzbekistan's capital Tashkent.

== International relations ==
=== Twin towns ===
Atyrau is twinned with:

- Aktau, Kazakhstan
- Oral, Kazakhstan
- Aktobe, Kazakhstan
- Shirvan, Azerbaijan
- (Georgia (country)) Borjomi, Georgia
- Astrakhan, Russia
- Syktyvkar, Russia
- Magnitogorsk, Russia
- Aberdeen, United Kingdom
- Ashdod, Israel
- Ashgabat, Turkmenistan

== Notable people ==
=== Arts, literature, and entertainment ===
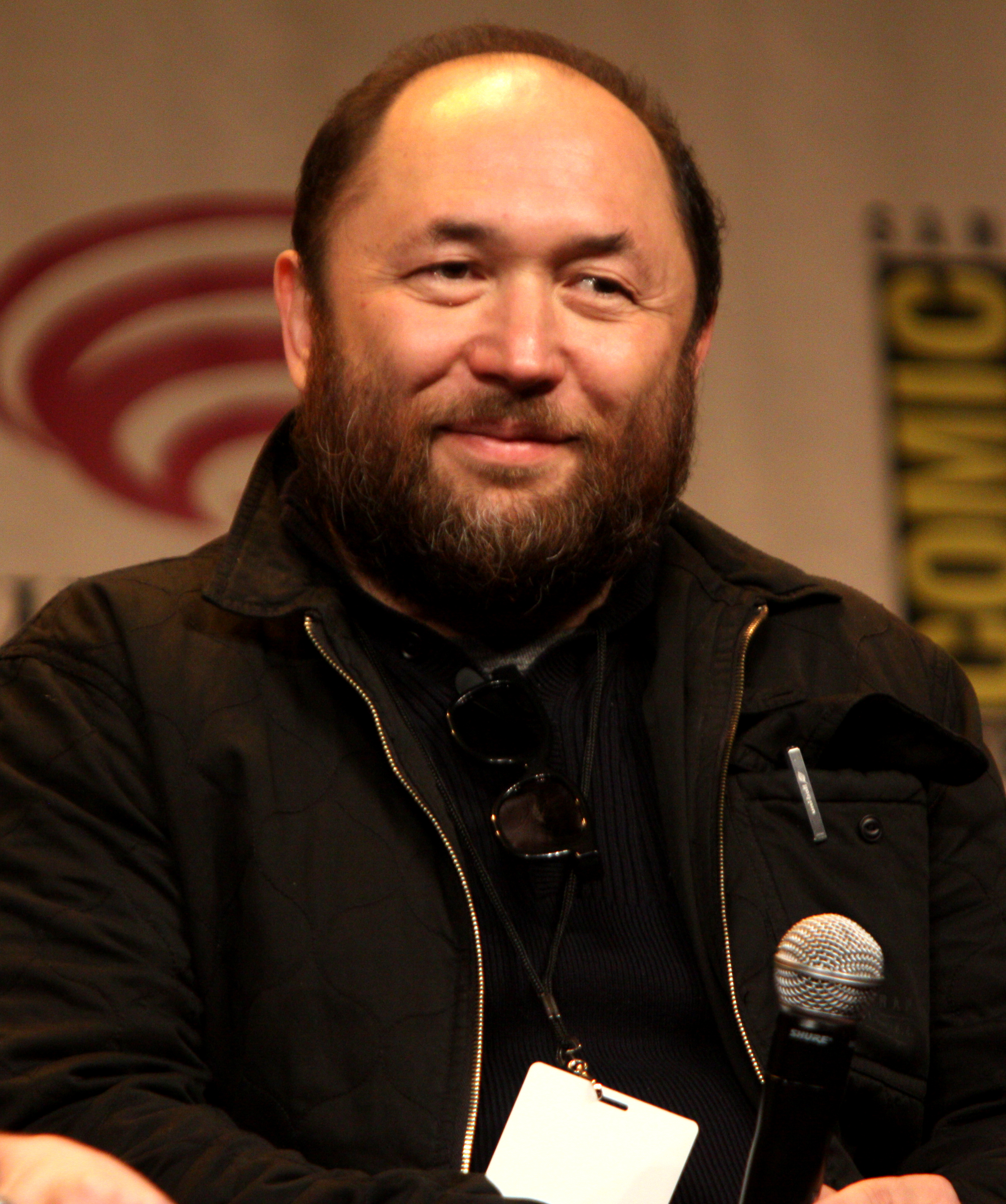
Timur Bekmambetov, 2012

- Timur Bekmambetov (1961), a Kazakh-Russian film director, producer, screenwriter, and tech entrepreneur

== Bridges of Atyrau ==
On August 28, 1965, the first real reinforced concrete bridge in the city, passing through the Ural River, was built and put into operation. The bridge is 259 meters (850 feet) long and 10 meters (33 feet) high. The bridge connects Satpayev Avenue and Abay Street. On the right European coast on Satpayev Avenue, the akimat (mayor's office) of the city and akimat (governor) of the Atyrau region adjoin the bridge.

In 2001, a unique pedestrian suspension bridge was built. The 551-meter-long (1,808-foot) bridge is listed in the Guinness Book of Records as the longest pedestrian bridge in the world. From the middle of the bridge over the Urals there are views of Azattyk Avenue and its surroundings.

In 2009, the Sultan Beibars was opened – a four-lane bridge with a throughput capacity of 5–7 thousand cars a day, 800 meters (2,600 feet) long with access roads, 380.74 meters (1,249.1 feet) long and 22 meters (72 feet) wide. The width of the roadway is 16 meters (52 feet), plus two walking paths of 2.5 meters (8.2 feet) each.

== See also ==
- Beibarys Atyrau
- Atyrau Football Club
- Atyrau Airport
- Radio Tandem
