= List of cities in Kazakhstan =

Provinces and main cities of Kazakhstan

The following is a list of cities with more than 50,000 inhabitants in Kazakhstan. The names of many places have been changed during the 20th and 21st centuries, sometimes more than once. Wherever possible, the old names have been included and linked to the new ones.

As of 1 January 2025, the share of Kazakhstan's urban population is 63%.

== List ==
Insignia	Name in English	Name in Kazakh	Previous name(s)	City since	Pop. 1979	Pop. 1989	Pop. 1999	Pop. 2008	Pop. 2023	Status	Province
	Almaty	Алматы; Almaty [ɑɫmɑˈtə]	Vernyy, Alma-Ata	1867	909,644	1,127,884	1,129,356	1,328,362	2,217,700	1	Capital 1929–1997
	Astana	Астана; Astana [ɑstɑˈnɑ]	Akmola, Akmolinsk, Tselinograd, Nur-Sultan	1831	233,638	277,365	312,965	389,189	1,417,214	1	Capital
	Shymkent	Шымкент; Şymkent [ʃəmˈkʲent]	Chimkent, Chernyayev	Middle Ages	321,535	380,091	390,200	454,583	1,216,000	1	Shymkent
	Aktobe	Ақтөбе; Aqtöbe [ɑqtɵˈbʲe]	Aktyubinsk	1880	190,569	253,532	253,088	285,507	560,820	2	Aktobe Province
	Karaganda	Қарағанды; Qarağandy [qɑˌrɑʁɑnˈdə]		1934	571,877	507,318	436,864	451,800	515,819	2	Karagandy Province
	Taraz	Тараз; Taraz [tɑˈrɑz]	Talas, Zhambyl, Aulie-Ata	ancient	263,793	303,961	330,125	398,233	427,394	2	Jambyl Province
	Oskemen	Өскемен; Öskemen [w̜ɵskʲeˈmʲen]	Ust-Kamenogorsk	1868	274,287	322,221	310,950	344,421	400,142	2	East Kazakhstan Region
	Pavlodar	Павлодар; Pavlodar [pɑʋɫəˈdɑr]		1861	272,895	329,681	320,400	354,809	367,254	2	Pavlodar Province
	Semey	Семей; Semei [sʲeˈmʲej]	Alash-kala, Semipalatinsk	1782	282,574	317,112	292,500	312,136	328,782	3	East Kazakhstan Region
	Kyzylorda	Қызылорда; Qyzylorda [qɯˌzɯɫorˈdɑ]	Perovsk, Ak-Mechet	1867	156,128	150,425	157,364	182,929	315,550	2	Kyzylorda Province
	Atyrau	Атырау; Atyrau [ɑtəˈrɑw]	Guryev	1885	130,916	149,261	142,497	158,308	315,274	2	Atyrau province
	Aktau	Ақтау; Aqtau [ɑqˈtɑw]	Shevchenko	1963		159,245	143,396	180,373	270,886	2	Mangystau Province
	Kostanay	Қостанай; Qostanai [qostɑˈnɑj]	Kustanay	1893	164,500	223,558	221,429	249,395	265,718	2	Kostanay Province
	Oral	Орал; Oral [woˈrɑɫ]	Uralsk	1613	167,352	199,522	212,900	255,489	254,380	2	West Kazakhstan Region
	Petropavl	Петропавл; Petropavl [pʲetrəˈpɑʋ(ə)ɫ]	Petropavlovsk	1807	206,559	239,606	216,300	208,547	222,076	2	North Kazakhstan Province
	Turkistan	Түркістан; Türkıstan [tʉrk(ɘ)sˈtɑn]		ancient	66741	77,692	87,600	109,673	220,133	3	South Kazakhstan Province
	Kokshetau	Көкшетау; Kökşetau [ˌkɵkʃʲeˈtɑw]	Stanitsa Kokchetavskaya, Kokchetav	1824	103,162	135,424	123,389	132,753	191,105	2	Akmola Province
	Temirtau	Теміртау; Temırtau [tʲemɘrˈtɑw]		1945	213,026	213,551	181,800	179,520	171,890	3	Karagandy Province
	Taldykorgan	Талдықорған; Taldyqorğan [tɑɫˌdəqorˈʁɑn]		1944	87,948	118,623	107,100	114,728	168,674	2	Almaty Province
	Ekibastuz	Екібастұз; Ekıbastūz [ˌjekɘbɑsˈtʊz]		1957	65,871	135,006	137,200	158,165	152,509	3	Pavlodar Region
	Janaözen	Жаңаөзен; Jañaözen [ʒɑˌŋɑɵˈzʲen]	Noviy Uzen	1968	34,000	48,300	51,100	60,796	152,431	3	Mangystau Province
	Jezkazgan	Жезқазған; Jezqazğan [ʒʲezqɑzˈʁɑn]	Dzhezkazgan	1954	89,200	107,053	103,400	112,154	85,012	3	Karagandy Province
	Balqash	Балқаш; Balqaş [bɑɫˈqɑʂ]		1937	78,145	86,742	81,100	86,897	81,364	3	Karagandy Province
	Baikonur	Байқоңыр; Baiqoñyr [bɑjqoˈŋər]	Leninsk	1969		74,700	60,200	59,452	76,019	1	Kyzylorda Province
	Kentau	Кентау; Kentau [kʲenˈtɑw]		1955	62,991	63,784	58,100	60,799	74,464	4	South Kazakhstan Province
	Stepnogorsk	Степногорск; Stepnogorsk [stʲɪpnɐˈɡorsk]		1964	46,700	63,300	50,900	47,705	68,460	3	Akmola Province
	Satpayev	Сәтбаев; Sätbaev [sætˈpɑjɪf]		1973	48,700	59,343	62,900	73,874	68,379	3	Karagandy Region
	Ridder	Риддер; Ridder [ˈrʲidʲːɪr]	Leninogorsk	1934	68,135	68,730	56,269	54,252	52,068	3	East Kazakhstan Region
	Schuchinsk	Щучинск; Şçuçinsk [ˈɕːutɕɪnsk]		1939		55,500	47,900	50,128	47,625	4	Akmola Province
	Shakhtinsk	Шахтинск; Şahtinsk [ˈʃɑχtʲɪnsk]		1961	50,382	65,600	54,800	54,748	39,185	3	Karagandy Region
	Saran	Саран; Saran [sɑˈrɑn]		1954	54,878	63,900	48,500	49,082	34,636	3	Karagandy Province
	Arkalyk	Арқалық; Arqalyq [ɑrqɑˈɫəq]		1965	47,963	62,367	45,700	56,614	28,907	4	Kostanay Province

== Gallery ==
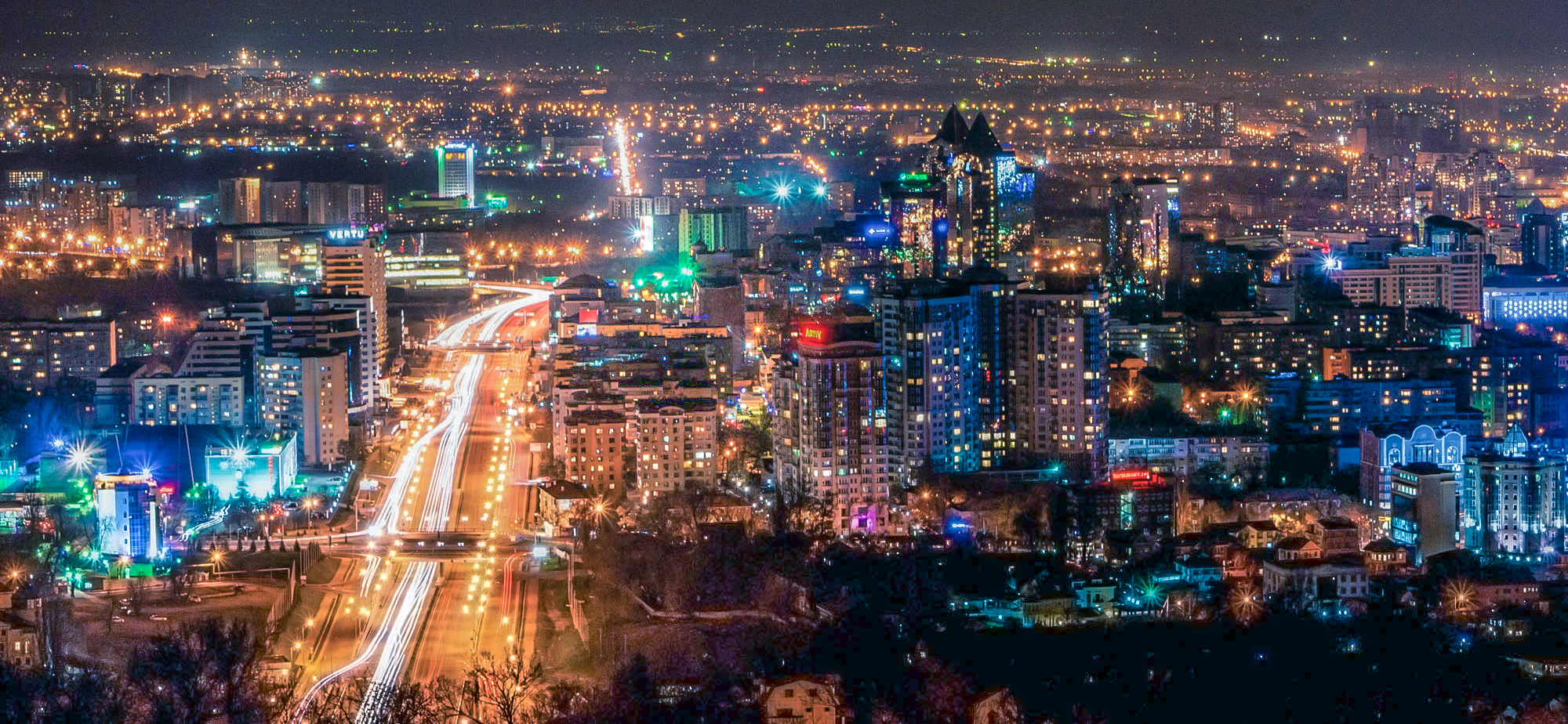
Almaty

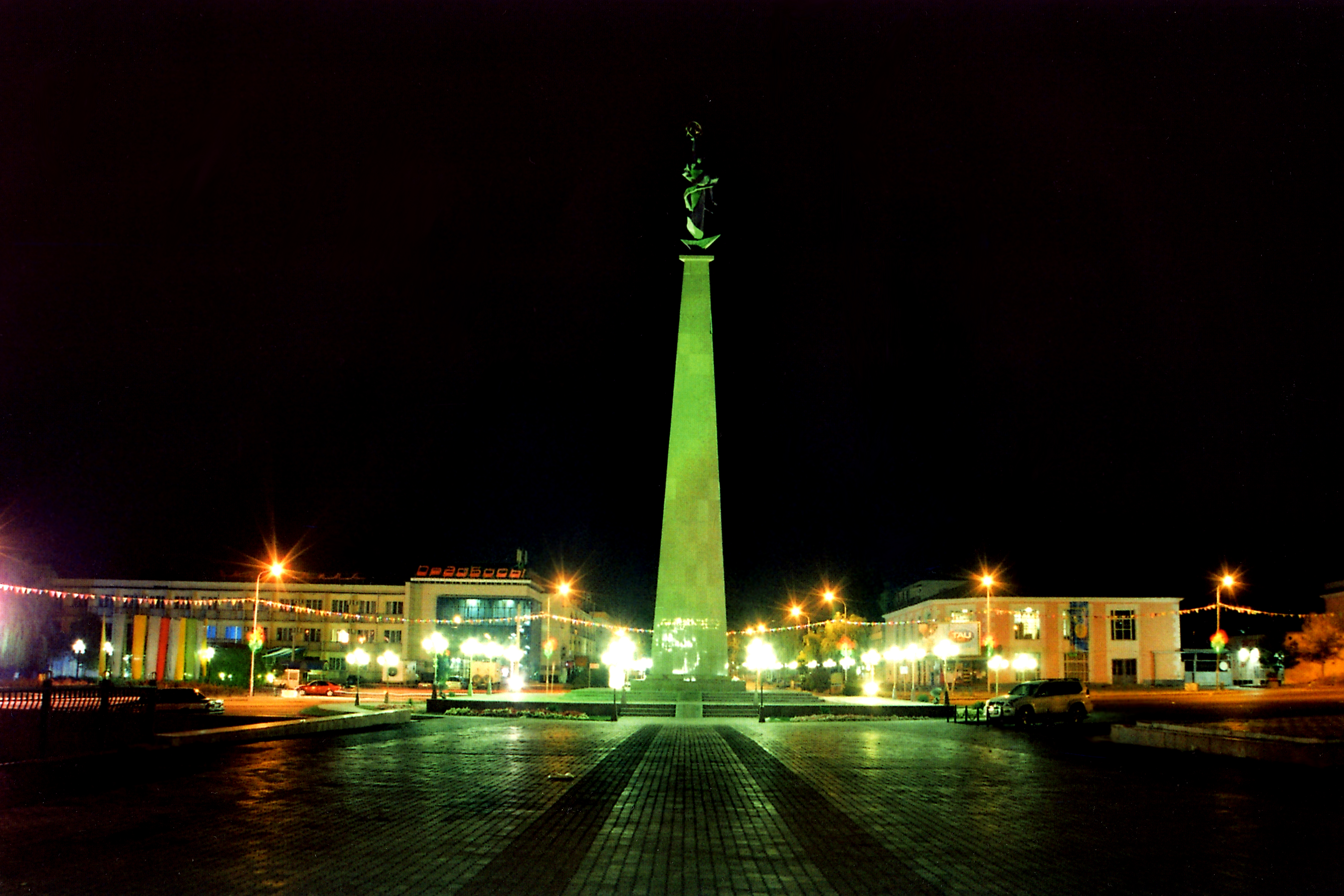
Shymkent

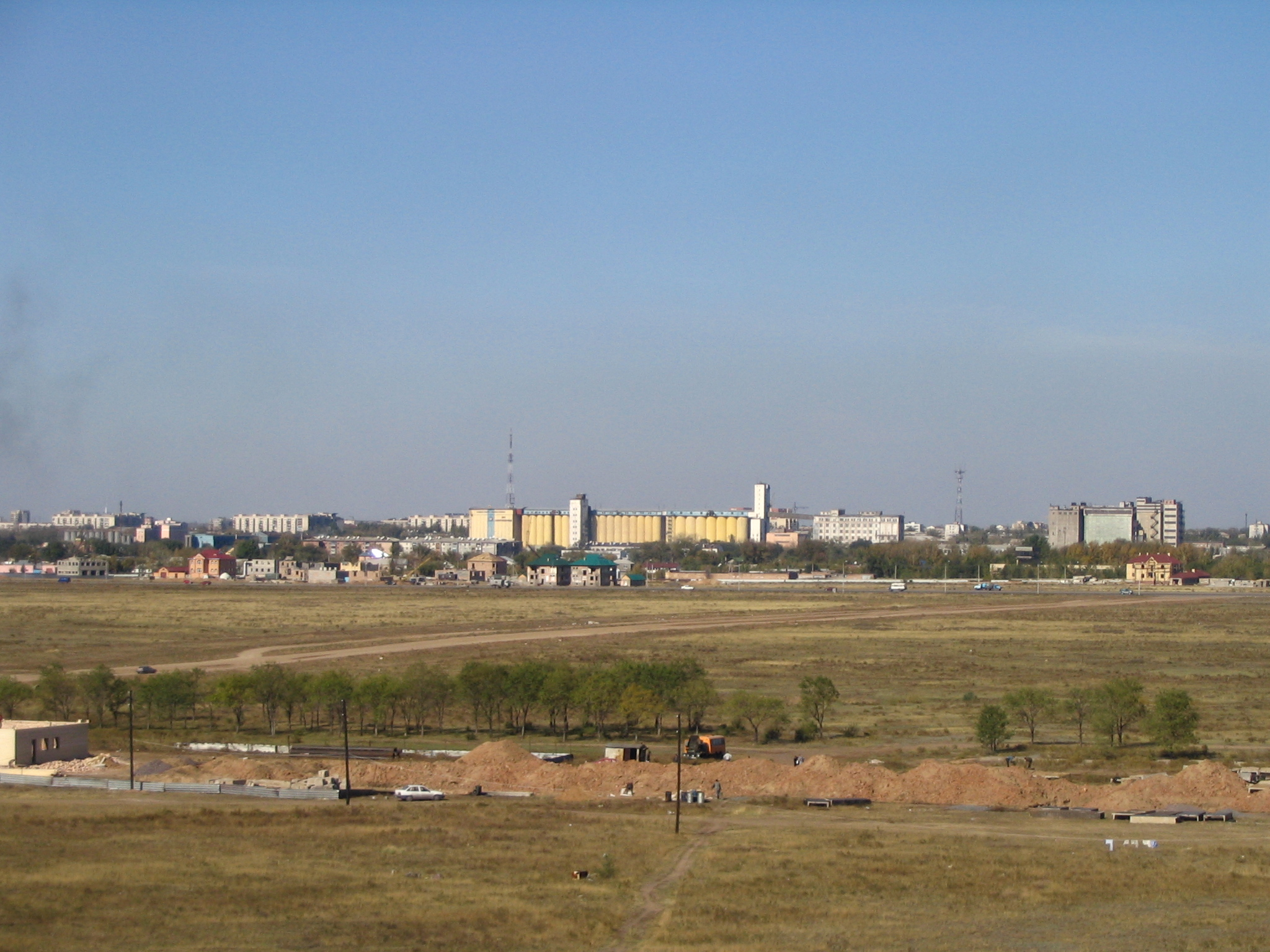
Karaganda

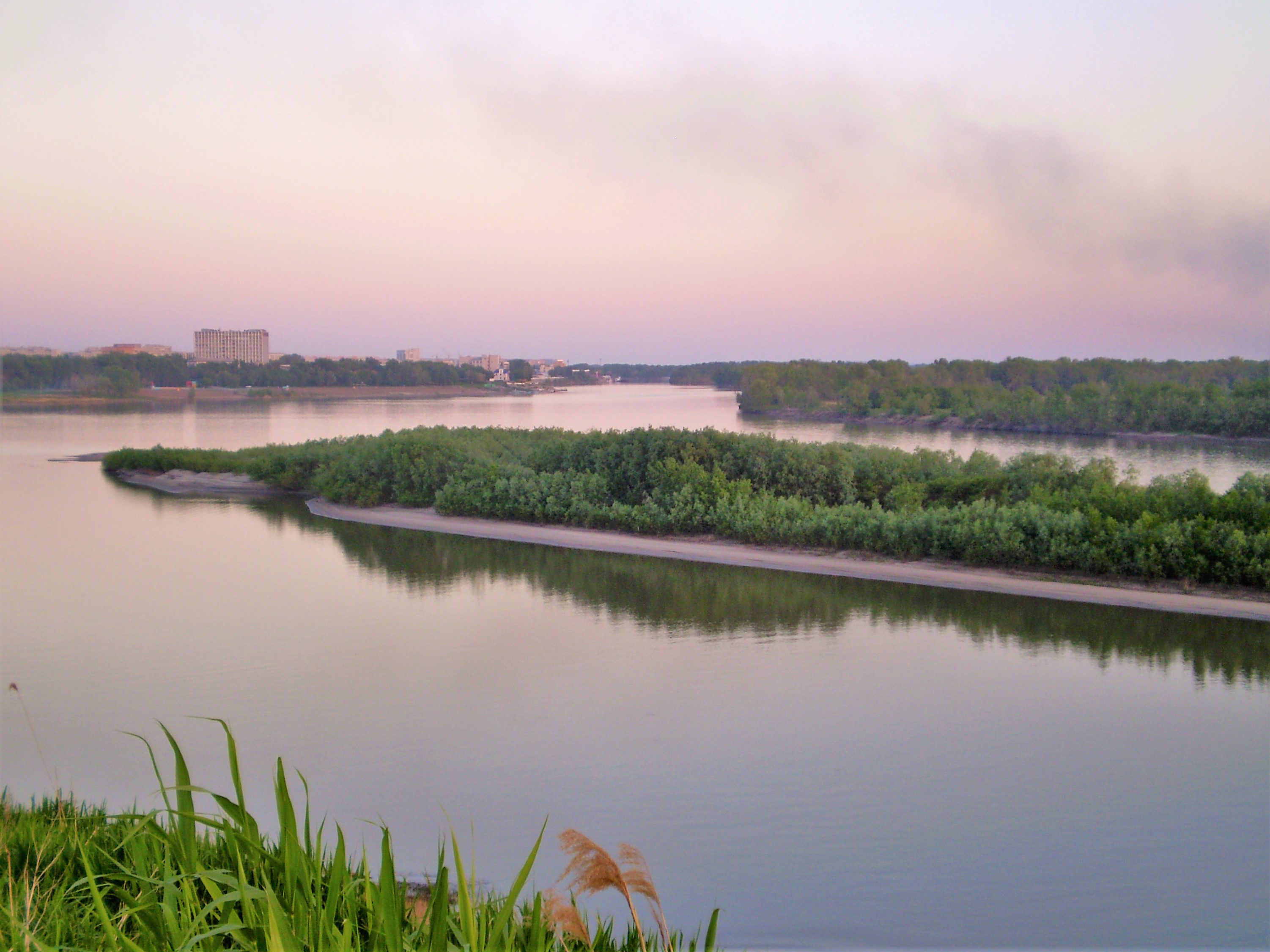
Pavlodar

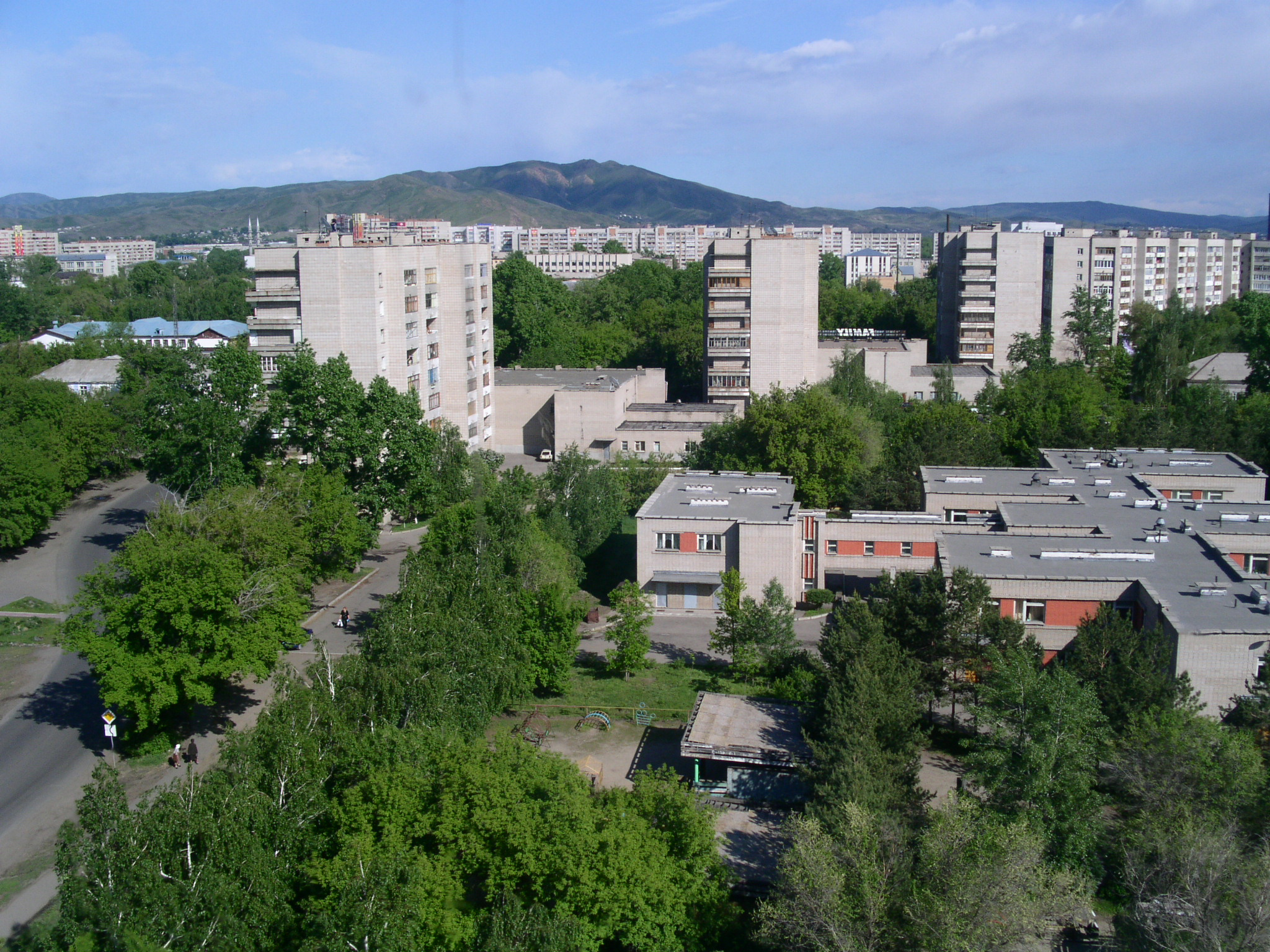
Oskemen

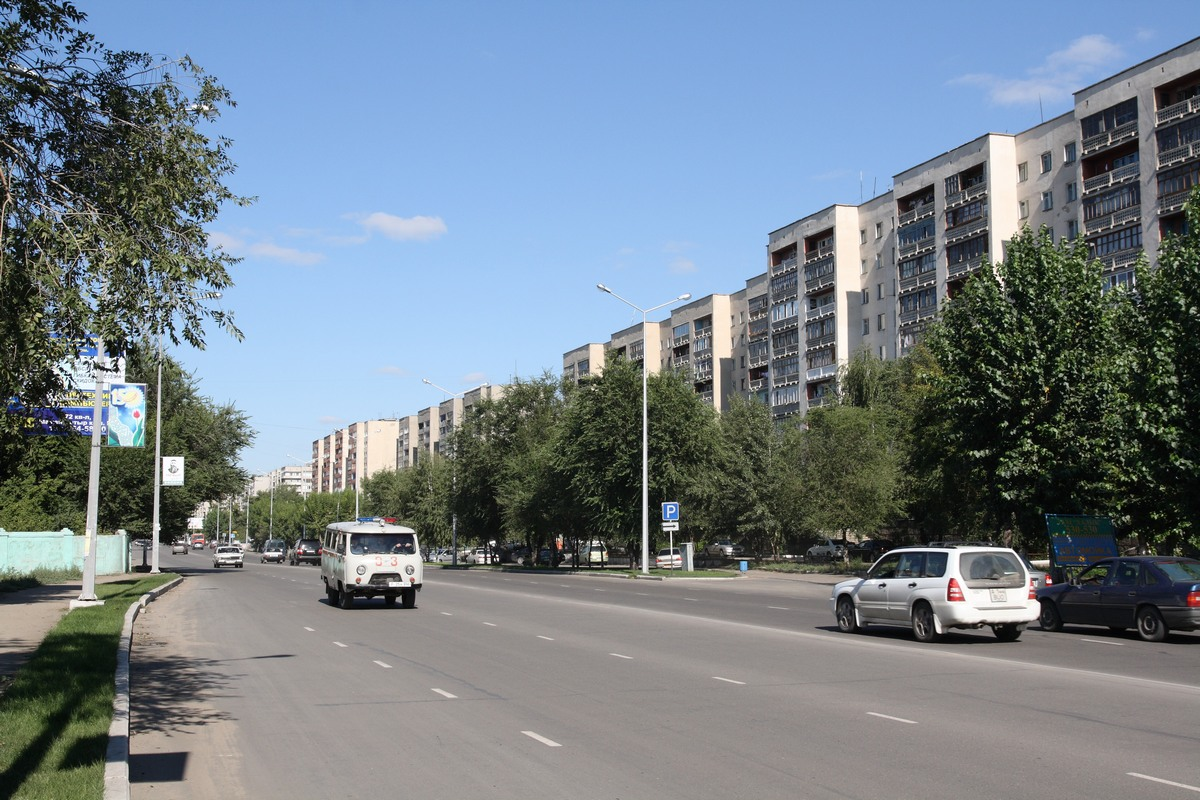
Semey

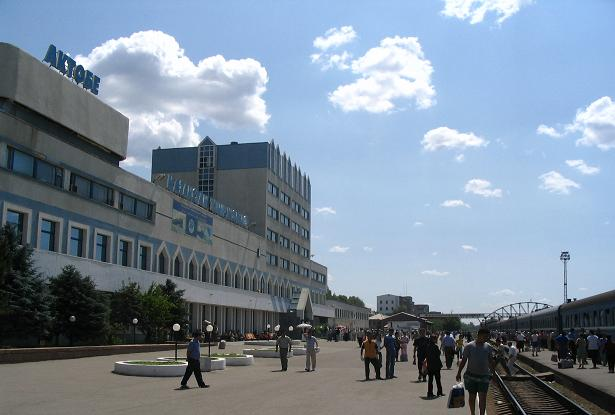
Aktobe

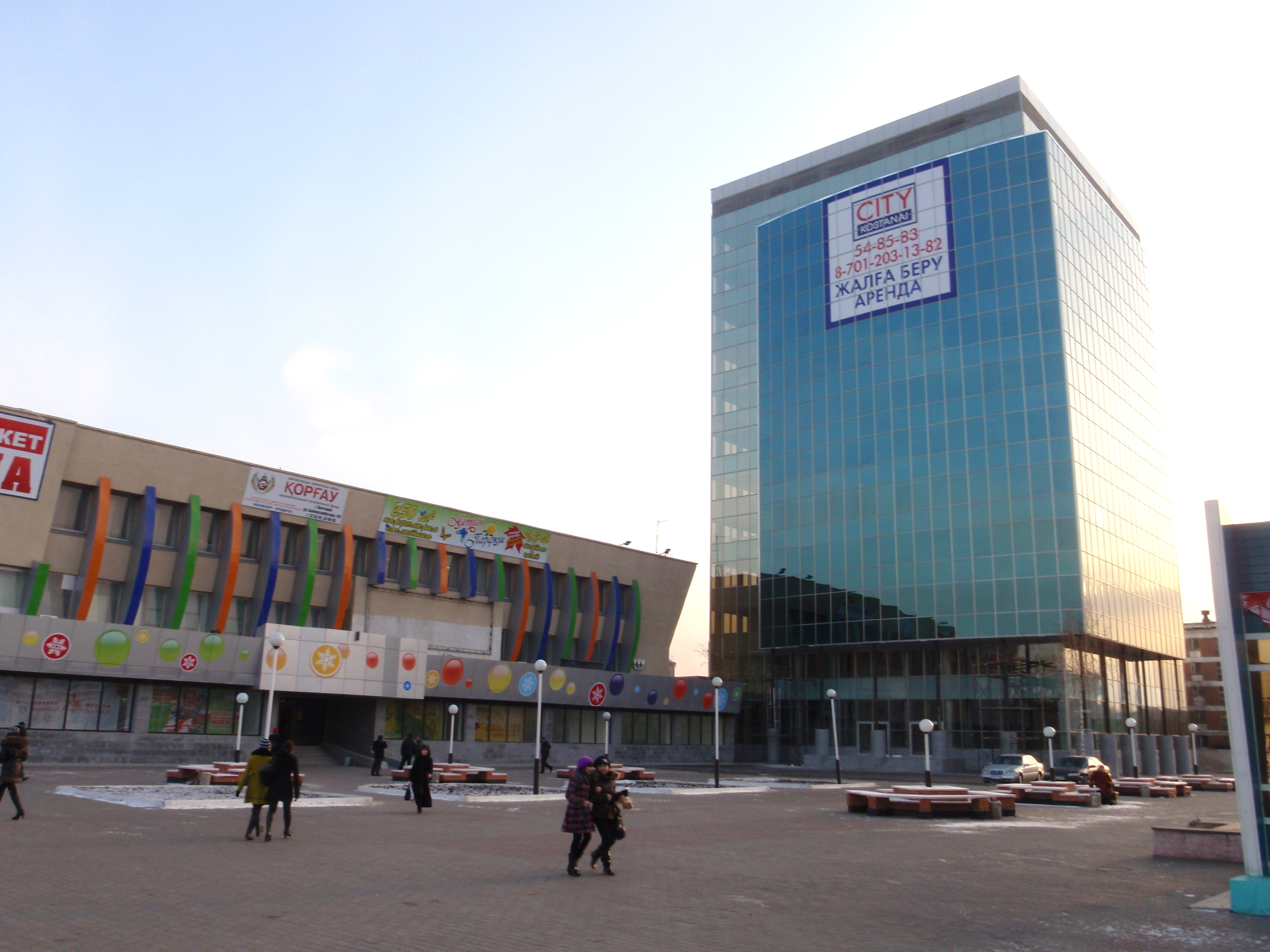
Kostanay

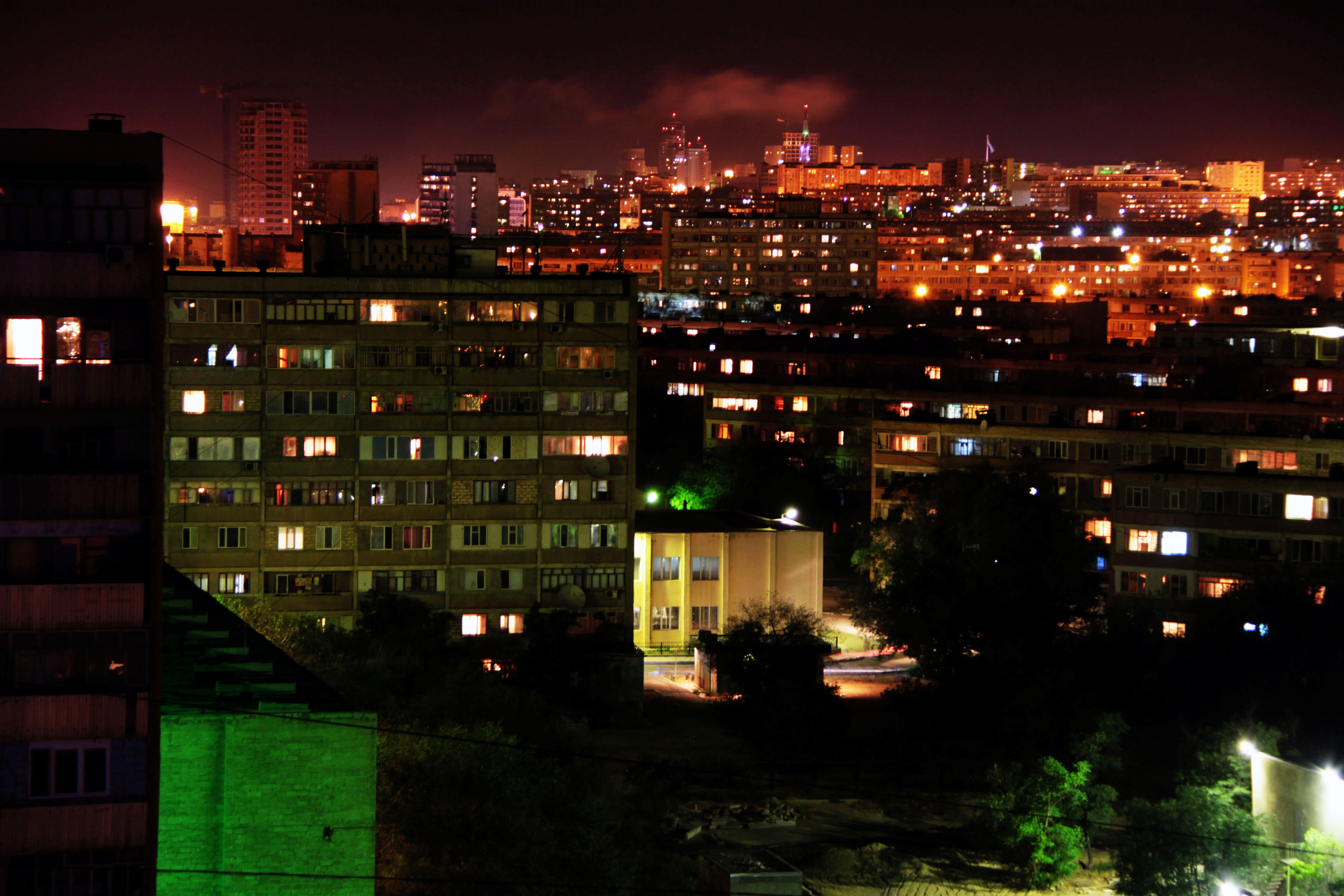
Aktau

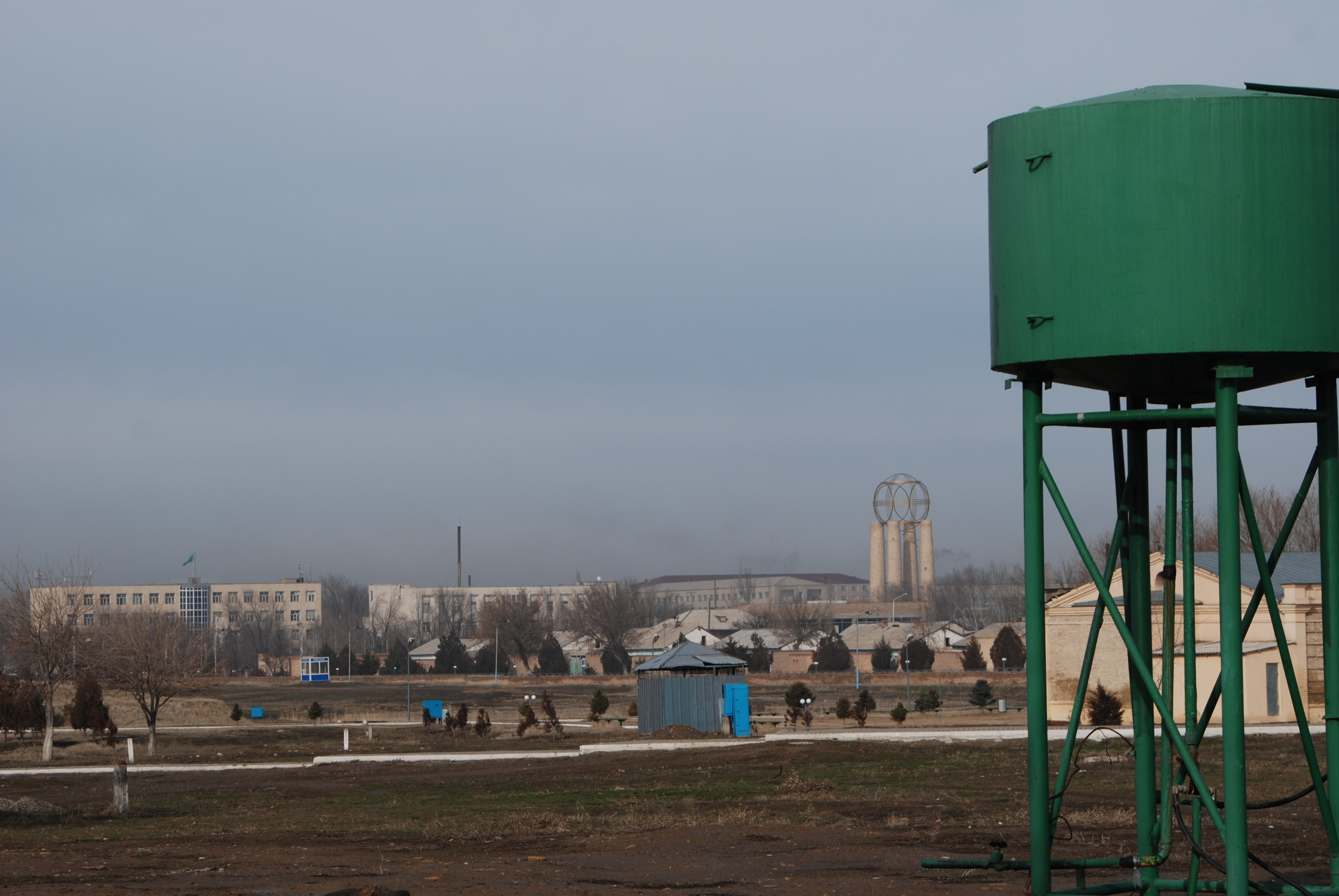
Turkistan

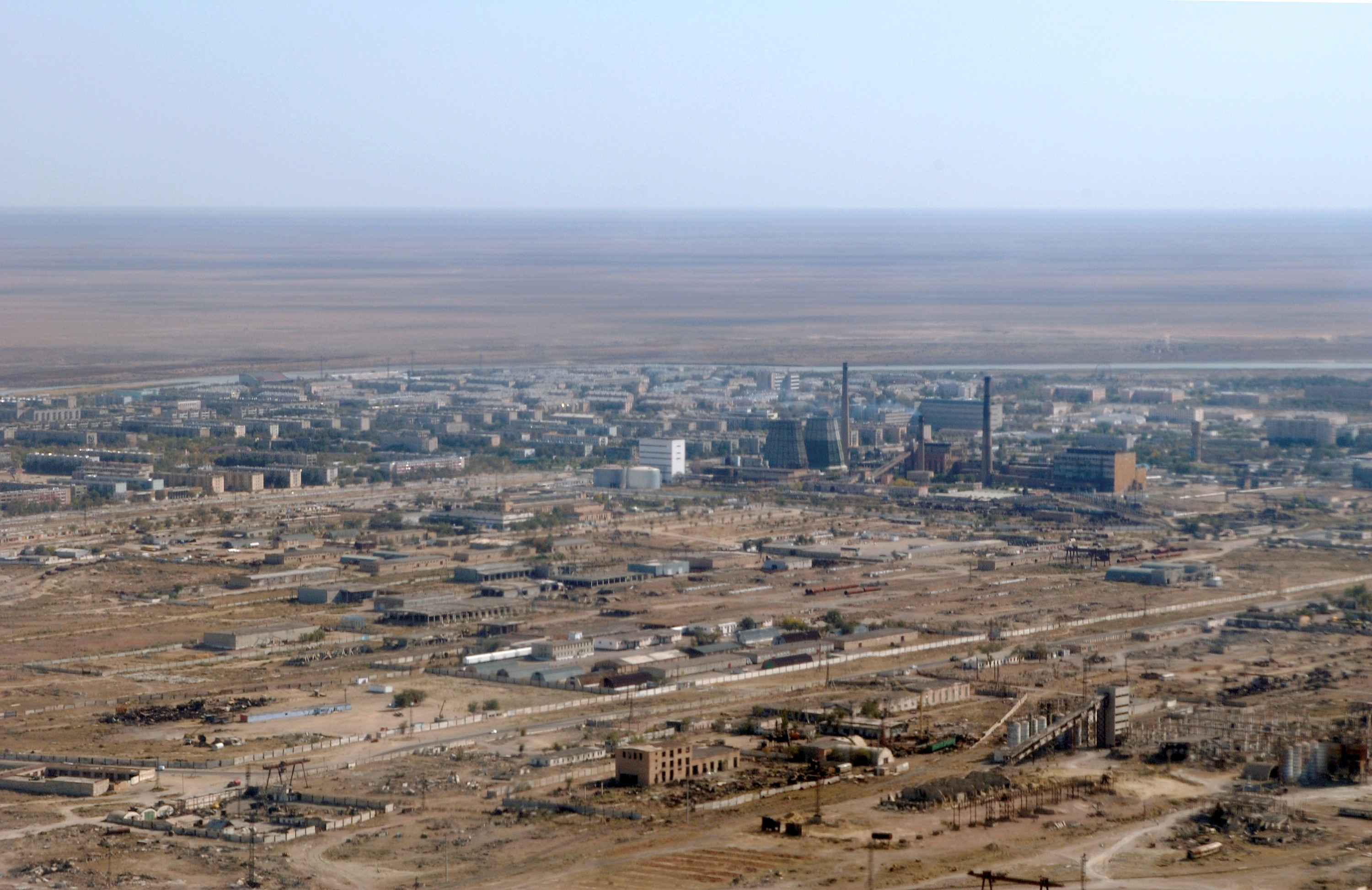
Baikonur
