= Aktobe =

City in Aktobe Region, Kazakhstan

Aktobe Ақтөбе (Kazakh) Актобе (Russian)
- City
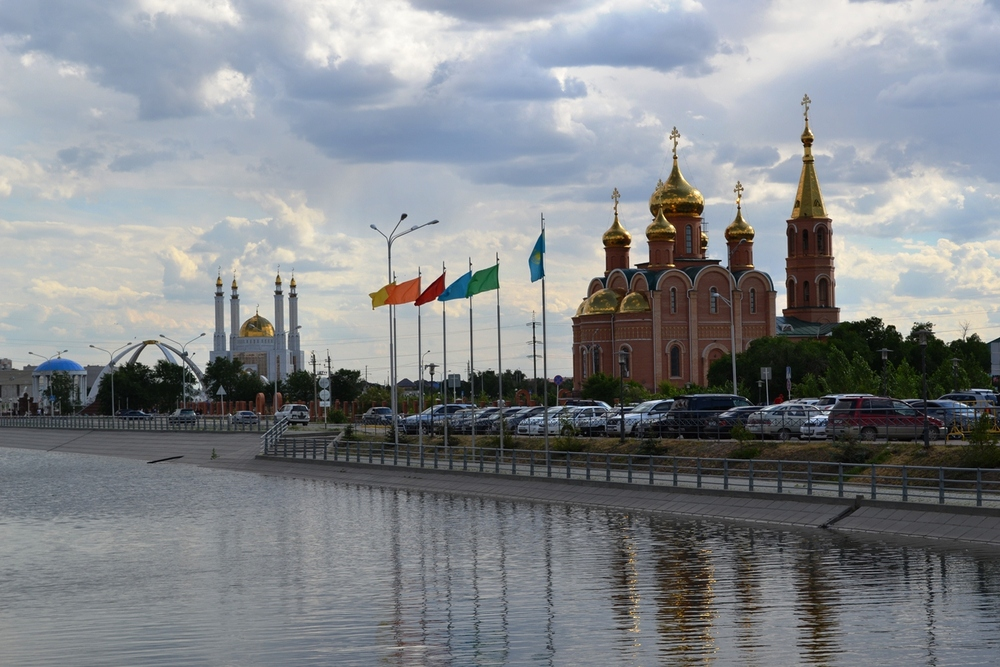
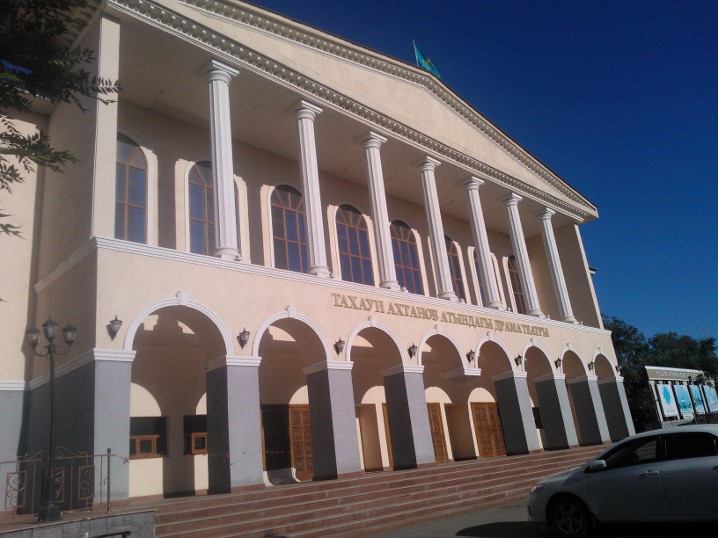
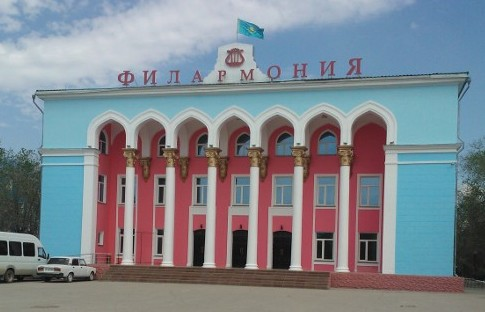
- From the top, St. Nicholas Cathedral & the Nur Ghasyr Mosque, Akhtanov Theatre, Philharmonia hall

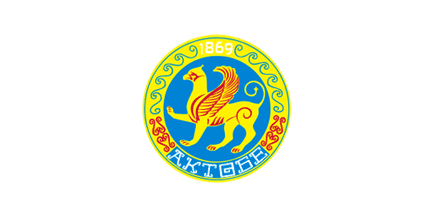
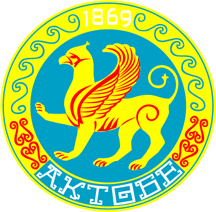
- Flag Seal

- Location in Kazakhstan Aktobe (Asia)
- Coordinates: 50°17′01″N 57°13′47″E
- Country: Kazakhstan
- Region: Aktobe Region
- Founded: 1869

Government
  - Akim: Azamat Beket

Area
  - City: 400 km^{2} (150 sq mi)
- Elevation: 219 m (719 ft)

Population (2026)
  - City: 598,683
  - Rank: 4th in Kazakhstan
  - Density: 1,500/km^{2} (3,900/sq mi)
  - Urban: 416,455
- Time zone: UTC+05:00 (Kazakhstan Time)
- Postal code: 030001
- Area code: +7 7132
- Vehicle registration: 04, D
- Climate: Dfa
- HDI (2023): 0.829 high · 4th
- GDP (nominal): 2022
  - Total: ▲$9,6 billion (KZT 4 416 899,4 million)
  - Per capita: ▲$10,474 (KZT 4 788,2 thousand)
- Website: http://www.akimataktobe.gov.kz/

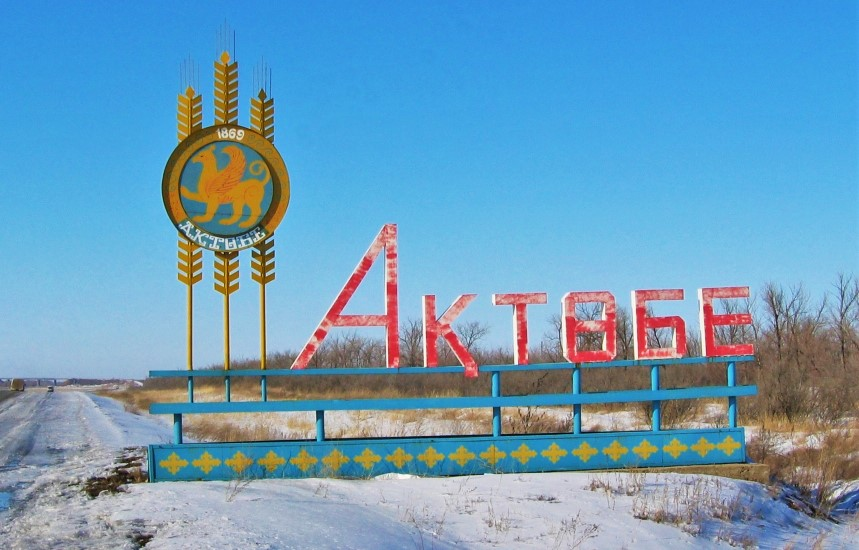
Aktobe coat of arms on roadside sign at the city limit

The Mausoleum of Kazakh War-leader Olzhas Batyr, outside Aktobe

Aktobe (Kazakh: Ақтөбе, romanized: Aqtöbe, pronounced [ɑqtɵbʲé]; Russian: Актобе) is a major city in western Kazakhstan, located on the river Ilek. It serves as the administrative center of the Aktobe Region and is an important cultural, economic, and industrial hub. As of 2023, the city had a population of 560,820, making it the fourth-largest city in Kazakhstan, and the largest in the western part of the country. It covers an expansive area of approximately 428.469 km^{2} and is strategically located to serve as a regional center for trade and commerce.

Aktobe is known for its natural resources, with two significant water reservoirs, Aktobe and Sazdy, supplying the city and surrounding areas. The city's economy is driven primarily by industries such as coal mining, metallurgy, and the extraction and processing of oil and gas. These industries have contributed to Aktobe's growth, transforming it into a vital center for energy production and heavy industry in Kazakhstan.

Aktobe's infrastructure has developed alongside its industrial growth. It is well-connected by road and rail to other major cities in Kazakhstan and neighboring countries. The city is undergoing rapid urbanization, with plans for further expansion and development. The agglomeration of Aktobe and surrounding settlements is expected to increase significantly in the coming years, with a projected population of around 1.3 million people. In addition to its industrial significance, Aktobe is a growing cultural center. It hosts a variety of cultural events and its educational institutions, including universities and technical schools, have contributed to its development as a center for higher learning and innovation.

== Etymology ==
The name Aktobe comes from Kazakh ақ ("white") and төбе ("hill"); the name refers to the heights on which the original 19th-century settlement was located. Until 1997, the city was officially known as Aktyubinsk (Russian: Актюбинск).

== History ==
=== Founding and growth ===
The territory of the present-day Aktobe Region has seen the rise and fall of many Central Asian cultures and empires. The region figured prominently in the history of the Kazakh "Little Horde". The Kazakh warlord Eset Batyr based his campaigns against the Dzungars from this area. His mausoleum is located 35 km (22 mi) to the south of Aktobe city. Abulkhair Khan (1693–1748) was also based in this region.

In March 1869, a Russian military fort with a garrison of 300 was built at the confluence of the Kargala and Ilek rivers, along the Orenburg–Kazalinsk caravan route. From that period onward, Slavic settlers began to migrate to the region in order to farm, and neighbourhoods were soon built around the fort. In 1874 the fort was expanded in size, and streets were laid out to and from the fort's gate. In 1891 the settlement was labelled a district city, officially named Aktyubinsk.

During the late 19th and early 20th centuries, the settlement rapidly expanded in size. While the 1889 population was listed as 2,600, by 1909 the population had increased more than four times to 10,716 official residents. The physical characteristics of the city had developed as well, and by the turn of the century the city had two churches, a seminary, a Tatar mosque, a Russian-Kyrgyz boys' school and girls' school, a clinic, a bank, a post office, a city park, a cinema and two mills. The Trans-Aral Railway was extended through the city in 1901. In the years leading up to World War I, industry began to develop in the town, including the construction of an electric factory, a brick factory, and the establishment of an annual trade fair.

The city was affected by the Russian Revolution of 1905, and strikes and riots took place between 1905 and 1907. Bolshevik revolutionaries were very active in the city, according to official Soviet histories. On 8 January 1918, the Bolsheviks moved to seize control of the local Soviet, and by 21 January the Bolsheviks had secured the city under their control.

=== Russian Civil War ===
With its location on the Trans-Aral Railway, Aktyubinsk was a strategic point much contested between the Red Army and their White opponents during the Russian Civil War. Kazakh and Russian inhabitants of Aktyubinsk and its environs actively supported both sides in the conflict.

In mid-1918, elements of the Bolshevik First Orenburg and Twenty-eighth Regiments, commanded by Georgy Zinoviev, were effectively besieged in Aktyubinsk by forces commanded by Ataman Dutov. Dutov, commanding approximately 10,000 rifles, 5,000 sabres, and 500 jigits (warriors) of the Alash Orda movement's newly formed Second Kazakh Mounted Regiment, attacked the city in October 1918. The attack only reached as far as the village of Ak Bulak.

In the autumn of 1918, Mikhail Frunze's Fifth Army and Mikhail Tukhachevsky's First Army were ordered to break through and clear the railway, in order to allow Red Army forces to link up with Bolsheviks along the Syr Darya. White pressure on Aktyubinsk was relieved by Frunze's capture of Uralsk, Orenburg and Orsk in early 1919, but by April, Dutov and Admiral Kolchak were able to launch a combined counteroffensive. Aktyubinsk finally fell to the Whites on 18 April 1919, once again severing Bolshevik rail links to Central Asia. In this offensive, the Whites also managed to capture and execute Amankeldı İmanov, a Kazakh military leader who had been operating in the Aktyubinsk region with the support of Bolsheviks in Moscow.

By June 1919, Frunze had received reinforcements and had moved back on to the offensive. On 10 September, Aktyubinsk was secured by the Fifth Army after an eight-day battle. 20,000 of Kolchak's troops were captured, along with the easternmost part of the city. From this point, Bolshevik forces were able to control the railway to Tashkent.

An All-Kazakhstan Conference of Soviet Workers was held in the city on 13 March 1920. This was the first in a series of regional organizing conferences held by the Bolsheviks that ultimately led to the creation of the Kirgiz Autonomous Soviet Socialist Republic – the entity that would ultimately develop into the Soviet Republic of Kazakhstan.

=== Modern history ===
In 1932, Aktyubinsk was named capital city of the Aktyubinsk Region. The city developed extensively during World War II as a result of the evacuation and relocation of factories from Ukraine and from Moscow, including a worker's cooperative, a ferroalloy factory, and an X-ray factory. Chromium also began to be mined and processed in the region. In the 1960s, an extensive expansion of the city was undertaken by Soviet authorities, resulting in the construction of a city center and a sports stadium.

The city's society and economy have dramatically changed since Kazakhstan's independence in 1991. Older heavy industries have declined and been replaced in importance with the energy sector. The city has continued to expand with new construction and with many Kazakh immigrants moving to the city from the surrounding countryside.

In 1999, the official name was changed from Aktyubinsk to Aktobe by presidential decree, as part of a nationwide effort to support the Kazakh language.

On May 17, 2011, Aktobe was the site of one of Kazakhstan's first terrorist attacks, when a suicide bomber blew himself up in the headquarters of the local national security services, injuring two people. Some analysts have interpreted this as a sign of increasing instability in the oil-rich, but socially unequal, region.

Further attacks by suspected Islamist militants occurred on June 5–6, 2016.

== Geography ==
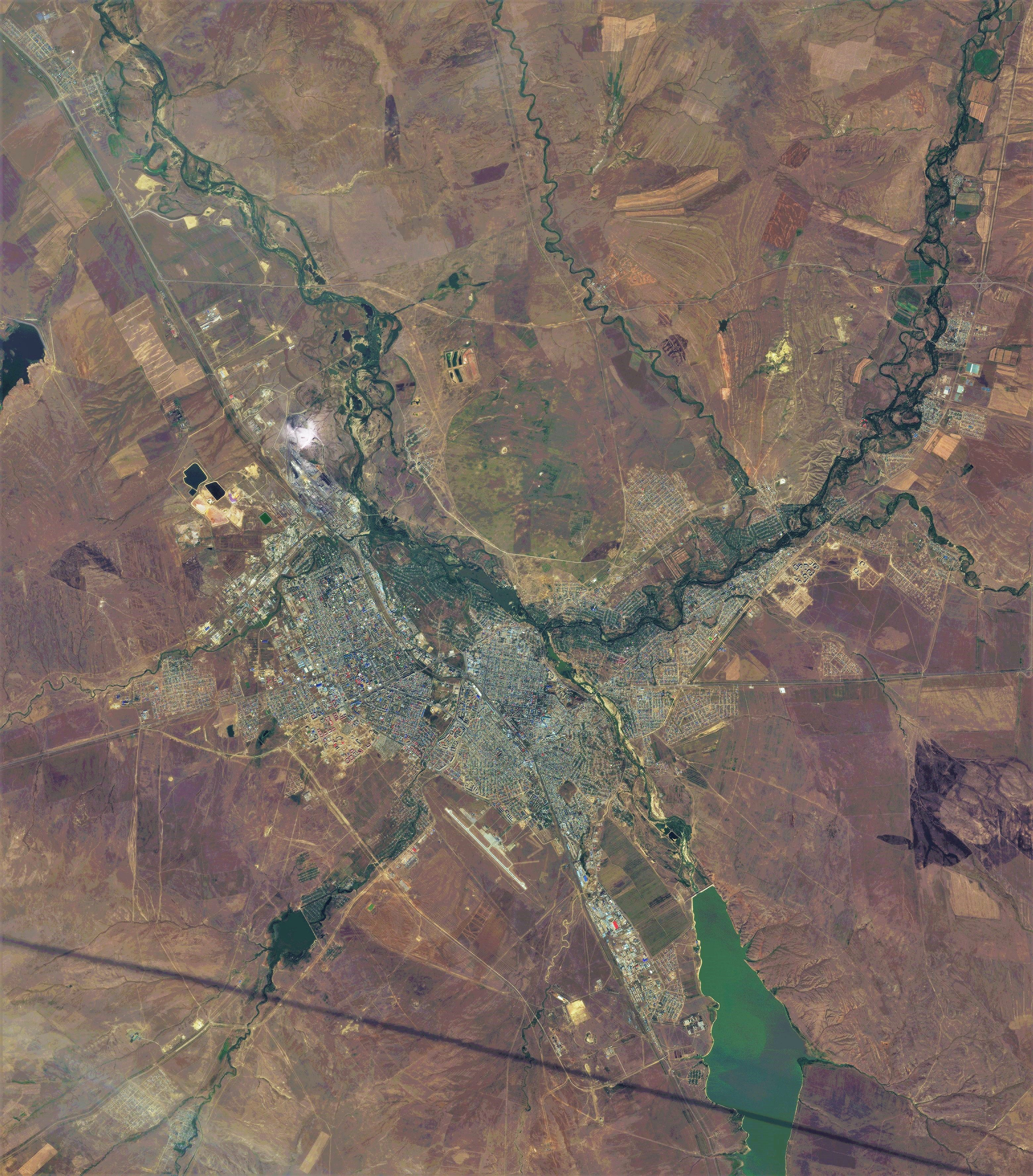
Aktobe and vicinities (ESA Sentinel-2 satellite image)

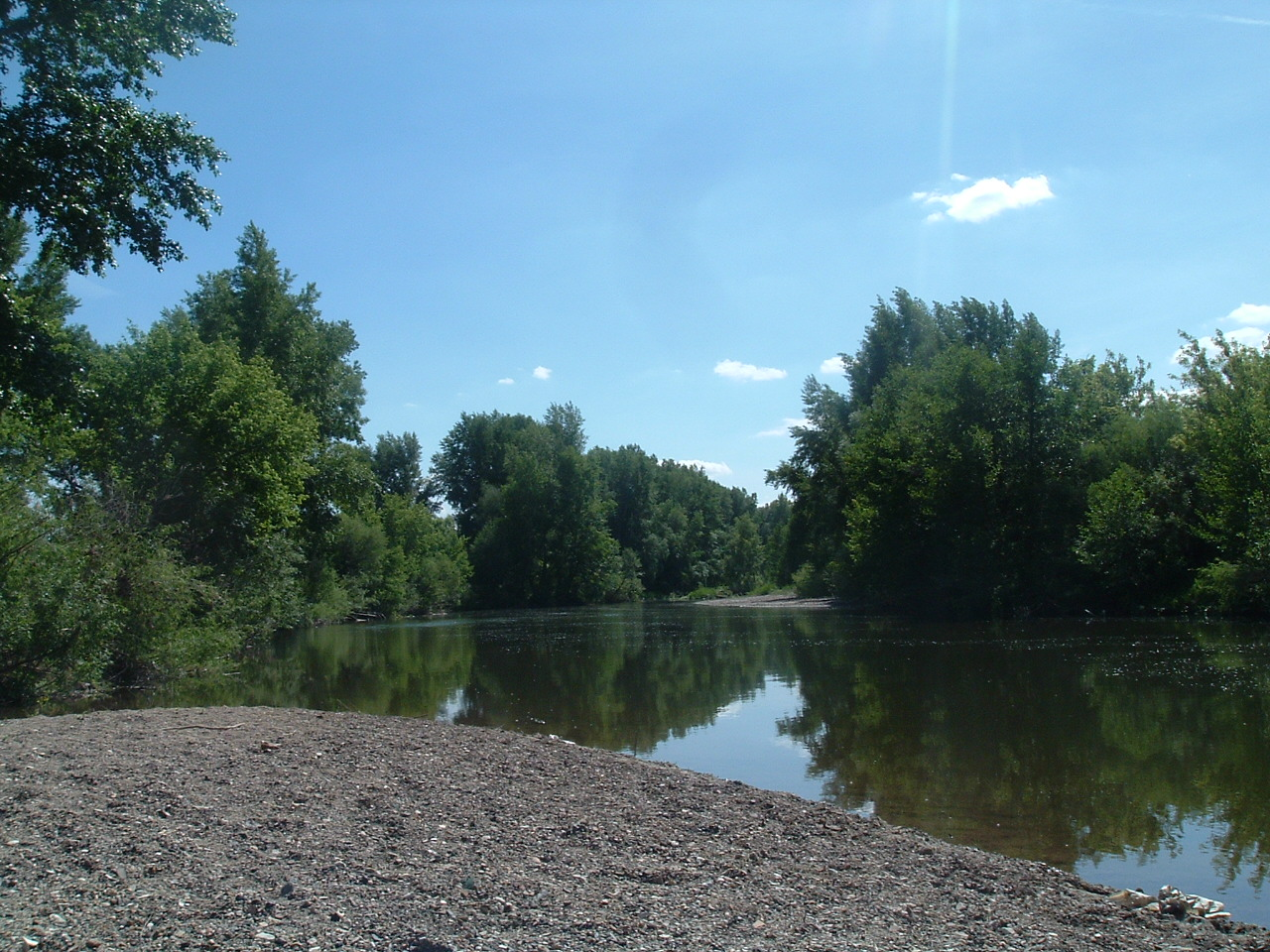
The Kargala River flows into the Ilek River on the outskirts of Aktobe

Aktobe Region is located in western Kazakhstan, and is the second largest region by area in Kazakhstan. The city of Aktobe is located where the Kargala and Ilek rivers meet. It is in the north-central part of Aktobe Region. The Russian city of Orenburg is located some 200 km (120 mi) to the northwest, while the Russian city of Orsk is about 150 km (93 mi) to the northeast. The area around the city of Aktobe is mostly flat steppe, with low hills rising to the northeast. Other rivers, such as the Emba and the Ural River, flow through the region. The region is bordered on the south by the Aral Sea. The natural vegetation cover around Aktobe city is steppe, while the southern parts of the region are semi-desert.

=== Hydrography ===
The city is located at the place where Kargaly flows into the Ilek River and its valley expands to 15 km. Directly in the center of the city flows the left tributary of Ilek - the Sazdy River, in the northwest - the left tributary of Ilek - the Zhinishke River. Since the channel of the Sazdy River lies in the central part of Aktobe and along it are large shopping and entertainment centers. In the southern part of the city are the lower reaches of the left tributary of Ilek - the Tamda River, but in the low-water period this channel dries up, forming several stretches. On the northern outskirts of the Zarechny district, the Peschanka river flows, the left tributary of the Kargaly, beyond which is the village of Kargaly. To the west of the Kirpichny district, separating it from the village of Akzhar, the Butak River flows through the lower part of the right tributary of the Kargaly.

At 10 km southeast of the city is the Aktobe reservoir with a volume of 245 million m^{3}, called the inhabitants of the Aktobe Sea, it was commissioned in 1988. The Sazdinskoye reservoir, 8 km south-west of the city, which is a traditional resting place for citizens, was built in 1967, and the Kargaly reservoir, which is the largest artificial reservoir near Aktobe (located outside the territory of the city administration), the volume of which is 280 million m^{3}, was commissioned in 1975 and is located 60 km northeast of the city.

=== Climate ===
Aktobe has a humid continental climate (Köppen climate classification Dfa), with wide seasonal variations in temperature. In winter, temperatures can reach a low of −48 °C (−54 °F), with a daily average minimum of −16 °C (3 °F). Summer temperatures can reach a high of 43 °C (109 °F), with an average maximum temperature of 30 °C (86 °F). The weather can change rapidly, especially during spring and autumn (the especially windy days in March when the weather changes are known locally as the Бес Қонақ, or "Five Guests"). Precipitation usually occurs in early spring and late autumn/early winter, and is otherwise sporadic throughout the year. Overall, Aktobe receives about 330 mm (13 in) of precipitation per year. The seasonal swings are exceptionally strong for the latitude due to its position right at the centre of the massive Eurasian landmass.

Climate data for Aktobe (1991–2020, extremes 1904–present)
Month	Jan	Feb	Mar	Apr	May	Jun	Jul	Aug	Sep	Oct	Nov	Dec	Year
Record high °C (°F)	4.5 (40.1)	5.5 (41.9)	23.6 (74.5)	30.9 (87.6)	39.0 (102.2)	40.3 (104.5)	42.3 (108.1)	42.9 (109.2)	38.8 (101.8)	29.7 (85.5)	17.0 (62.6)	11.2 (52.2)	42.9 (109.2)
Mean daily maximum °C (°F)	−8.4 (16.9)	−6.8 (19.8)	0.3 (32.5)	14.1 (57.4)	22.9 (73.2)	28.4 (83.1)	30.1 (86.2)	29.0 (84.2)	22.0 (71.6)	12.6 (54.7)	1.1 (34.0)	−5.9 (21.4)	11.6 (52.9)
Daily mean °C (°F)	−12.5 (9.5)	−11.7 (10.9)	−4.6 (23.7)	7.6 (45.7)	15.6 (60.1)	21.1 (70.0)	23.0 (73.4)	21.2 (70.2)	14.2 (57.6)	6.1 (43.0)	−3.0 (26.6)	−9.8 (14.4)	5.6 (42.1)
Mean daily minimum °C (°F)	−16.7 (1.9)	−16.2 (2.8)	−9.0 (15.8)	1.8 (35.2)	8.4 (47.1)	13.5 (56.3)	15.8 (60.4)	13.9 (57.0)	7.5 (45.5)	0.9 (33.6)	−6.4 (20.5)	−13.6 (7.5)	0.0 (32.0)
Record low °C (°F)	−48.5 (−55.3)	−45.0 (−49.0)	−37.0 (−34.6)	−18.9 (−2.0)	−7.6 (18.3)	−0.9 (30.4)	4.1 (39.4)	1.0 (33.8)	−7.9 (17.8)	−26.3 (−15.3)	−35.0 (−31.0)	−41.5 (−42.7)	−48.5 (−55.3)
Average precipitation mm (inches)	24.9 (0.98)	23.3 (0.92)	30.0 (1.18)	29.3 (1.15)	28.8 (1.13)	30.3 (1.19)	29.7 (1.17)	20.4 (0.80)	16.9 (0.67)	29.0 (1.14)	25.1 (0.99)	29.3 (1.15)	317 (12.47)
Average extreme snow depth cm (inches)	24 (9.4)	31 (12)	27 (11)	4 (1.6)	0 (0)	0 (0)	0 (0)	0 (0)	0 (0)	0 (0)	2 (0.8)	12 (4.7)	31 (12)
Average precipitation days (≥ 1.0 mm)	6.9	5.6	6.3	5.5	5.6	5.1	4.4	3.9	3.6	5.7	5.8	7.5	65.9
Average rainy days	3	2	4	10	13	12	11	10	10	10	8	4	97
Average snowy days	21	18	13	3	0.2	0.03	0	0	0.1	4	13	20	92
Average relative humidity (%)	81	79	79	66	57	54	55	54	58	69	80	82	68
Mean monthly sunshine hours	68.1	105.0	154.3	215.5	291.3	325.4	319.3	283.3	207.0	138.9	70.9	54.9	2,233.9
Source 1: Pogoda.ru.net
Source 2: NOAA

=== Vegetation ===
At the end of the 19th century, the region in which Aktobe was located was described as practically devoid of forest flora, but at the same time very rich in steppe vegetation. Deforestation in the then Aktyubinsk district led to the spread of sand from the neighboring Irgiz district and the disappearance of previously rich vegetation. In Soviet times, measures were taken to create a "green belt" around the city to protect against winter storms and summer dust storms.

The territory of the city is part of the Aktobe floristic district, which occupies more than half of the Aktobe region and the north-eastern part of the West Kazakhstan region. The following types of plants are widespread in Aktobe and its environs: desert sage, clover poppy and others.

=== Fauna ===
The territory of Kazakhstan consists of 22 zoogeographic sites. The city of Aktobe and the entire northern part of the Aktobe region belongs to the western steppe site, in which, unlike other steppe sites, representatives of European forest species live. In addition, in the western steppe area, the desert fauna is richer than in other steppe areas. The widespread desert species of dressings here is found only occasionally, from the Mongolian fauna you can usually see an Eversman hamster. Kazakh desert species also live here, and near Aktobe you can find the Turanian species of combed gerbils.

== Demographics ==
Aktobe ranks first in terms of population in Western Kazakhstan and is the fourth most populous city in the country (after Almaty, Astana and Shymkent). Aktobe rose in October 2019 from fifth to fourth place in terms of the number of inhabitants when the population of the city reached 497,381 inhabitants, overtaking Karaganda (496,701 people) in this indicator. By the end of 2019, the population of the city crossed 500,000 people and as of January 1, 2020, numbered 500,803 people. The population density in the territory of the city administration (2,338 km^{2}) is 214.2 people per km^{2}.

There are several reasons for changes of this position. First, the statistical authorities began to take into account 59,000 residents of rural districts near Aktobe, disbanded in 2018 and included in the city. Secondly, the natural population growth in Aktobe for nine months of 2019 numbered 6,807 people, while in Karaganda during the same period the natural increase reached 2,712 people. Thirdly, during the same period in Aktobe there was a migration increase numbering 2,580 people, while in Karaganda there was a migration decrease numbering 3,741 people.

Aktobe is one of the fastest-growing cities in Kazakhstan – in 2003–2013 the population increased by 50%. For comparison, the population of the cities of Turkestan, Zhanaozen and Kaskelen, which showed the most impressive growth rates, grew by 78% over the indicated period. An increase in the birth rate and a decrease in the number of child deaths contribute to the city's population.

The main sources of urban population growth are natural growth and migration. So (data for the territory subordinated to the city administration) for the period from January 1, 2011, to October 1, 2015, the natural population growth numbered 36,158 people, and the positive balance of migration growth numbered 3,798 people, but the latter figure hides the multi-directional migration flows.

Migration outside the CIS (mainly ethnic Germans, as well as Russians traveling to Germany as members of mixed families) is insignificant, its balance was 76 people, while migration outflow to Germany numbered 103 people, migration exchange with other countries outside the CIS was weakly positive.

Migration within the CIS had a slight positive balance (371 people), but this is the result of the mutual compensation of two significant migration flows: the outflow of Russians (migration balance - 1,221 people, mainly to Russia) and the influx of ethnic Kazakhs (migration balance of 1,173 people), mainly from the countries of Central Asia).

Migration exchange with other regions of Kazakhstan had a negative migration balance of 5,437 people, mainly it was an outflow of ethnic Kazakhs (balance −5,073 people).

Intraregional migrations forming a migratory influx of the population of 9,685 people is the result of the mutual compensation of two significant migration flows: the outflow of Russians (migration balance - 1,221 people, mainly to Russia) and the influx of ethnic Kazakhs (migration balance of 1,173 people), mainly from the countries of Central Asia).

Migration exchange with other regions of Kazakhstan had a negative migration balance of 5,437 people, mainly it was an outflow of ethnic Kazakhs (balance −5,073 people). Intraregional migrations formed a migratory influx of the population of 9,685 people.

Ethnic groups (2021):

- Kazakh: 81.39%
- Russian: 13.2%
- Ukrainian: 1.88%
- Tatar: 1.23%
- Others: 2.29%

== Law and government ==
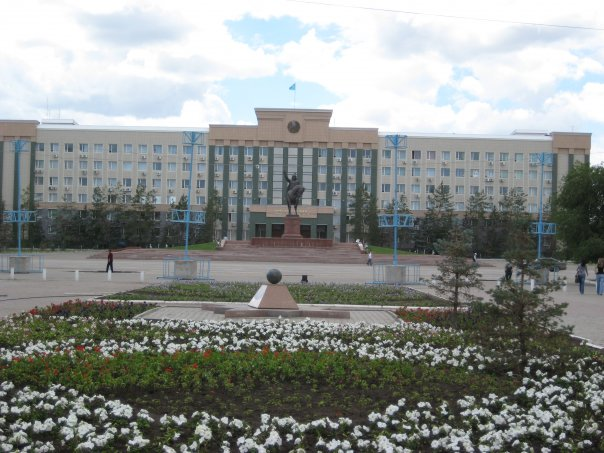
Government building

Aktobe is the capital city of Aktobe Region. An akim (governor) is appointed by the President of the Republic of Kazakhstan to act as chief executive. Aktobe has both the region and the municipal government (whose chief is also called Akim). The Municipal akim is appointed by the regional akim.

Region headquarters for the Kazakh National Security Committee (KNB), the Ministry of Foreign Affairs and for the Registry of the Republic of Kazakhstan are located in Aktobe.

Aktobe is the Headquarters for the Western Military District of the Republic of Kazakhstan. This district's responsibilities include defence of the Caspian Sea region, and the district is commanded by a Rear-Admiral. A Russian military presence is maintained in the region at the Emba missile testing range.

== Economy ==
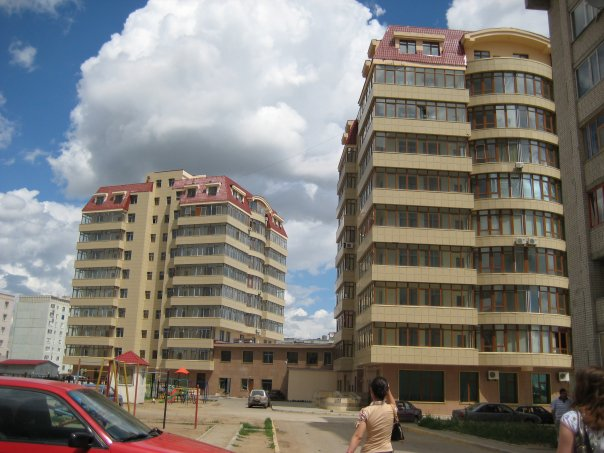
New buildings in Aktobe

Agriculture and ranching play a large role in Aktobe Region's economy and in rural employment. Beef, mutton and dairy products are major products in this area.

Heavy industry was established in Aktobe during the Second World War. Many of today's fastest-growing industries in Aktobe are related to food production (such as the company "Ramazan"), construction ("Dastan") or vodka distilling ("Wimpex" and "Ayazhan"). A number of foreign companies, notably German and Austrian firms, have established partnerships with local light industry firms. Both copper and chromite are mined in the Khromtau district of Aktobe Region.

However, the major engine of economic growth in Aktobe and Aktobe Region has been the development of energy resources. The Chinese National Petroleum Company (CNPC) owns a 60% stake in AktobeMunaiGaz, and is investing heavily in oil and natural gas extraction from Aktobe Region oilfields. A pipeline has been constructed to transport oil to Xinjiang (see Energy and Utilities).

The revenues from oil and gas extraction have helped to develop banking, real estate, and support services in Aktobe.

The region also possesses large deposits of phosphorite. One of the largest known being Chilisai deposit, the British company Sunkar Resources Plc (2008) has built an integrated production facility to develop one of the lowest cost producers of phosphate fertiliser in the world with its Chilisai Project (800Mt of ore averaging 10.5% P_{2}O_{5}).

=== Industry ===
Aktobe is a large industrial center, closely connected with chromite deposits east of the city. It houses plants of ferroalloys, chromium compounds, agricultural machinery, X-ray equipment, etc. The chemical, light, and food industries are developed.

In 1930, south of the city, the construction of one of the first and largest chemical industry enterprises in Kazakhstan, the Aktobe Chemical Plant, near which the city of Alga later grew, began. After the collapse of the USSR, production at a chemical plant was suspended and the once city-forming enterprise fell into complete decline. In 2018, the regional authorities decided to completely liquidate the plant. The Aktobe Ferroalloy Plant (Aktobe Ferroalloy Plant), commissioned in 1943, became the first ferrous metallurgy enterprise in Kazakhstan.

The cost of production of the city's enterprises in 2014 reached 257.9 billion tenge (1.44 billion US dollars) and amounted to 20.7% of the total regional indicators, which is 1.7% lower than the previous year. The metallurgical industry accounts for more than 30% of all production produced in the city, and the chemical industry accounts for 10.3% of the total.

The largest enterprises of the city are the Aktobe ferroalloy plant, Aktyubrentgen, Aktobe plant of chromium compounds and a number of food industry enterprises. AFP produces 22% of Kazakhstan's ferroalloys. Aktobe plant of chromium compounds is the only enterprise in the country producing chromium oxide, chromic anhydride, tannins, sodium dichromate.

In Aktobe there are large food industry enterprises producing flour, confectionery and pasta, vegetable oil and other products.

Aktobe region and Aktobe - one of the four regions of Kazakhstan, where the production of alcoholic beverages is concentrated. The local vodka producer GEOM LLP (Wimpex) is one of the largest vodka producers in Kazakhstan and occupies 22% of this market. Alcohol production is also carried out by Aktobe Champagne Wine Factory LLP, Arai CJSC, Centaur LLP, Aktobe Distillery Crystal, Kazakh-German joint venture Omirbek and Transmars LLP. The Omirbek and GEOM companies were several times included in the list of the largest taxpayers in the Aktobe region.

== Agriculture ==
At the end of 2014, 319 agricultural enterprises were registered on the territory of the Aktobe city administration, which produced goods worth 11,998.7 million tenge. Of these, 4112.5 million tenge accounted for crop production, and 7582.8 million tenge for livestock. In total, in 2014 they produced 4,800 tons of meat, 24,900 tons of milk, and 121.2 million pieces of eggs.

Despite the allocated subsidies in the amount of 360 million tenge, city livestock farmers were only able to satisfy the Aktobe need for eggs. In 2014, farmers produced 2,900 tons of meat and 20,000 tons of milk, while the need for meat and milk is 20,700 and 71,400 tons, respectively. However, other types of food (flour, vegetable oil) were produced several times more than the required amount.

On the territory of the city akimat in 2012, 32,021 garden plots were registered as part of collective gardening, as well as 1,101 garden plots as part of collective gardens. Some of the so-called horticultural plots are used not only for home gardening and horticulture, but also for temporary (seasonal) residence for the purpose of recreation and as an individual residential sector for permanent residence; the number of residents who use buildings in garden plots for permanent residence is estimated at 40,000 people. According to the leadership of the city, cottages impede the development of Aktobe. Registration of permits for the construction of cottages was suspended, and existing garden plots are planned to be vacated for the construction of multi-storey buildings. In the future, summer cottages will be located 10–20 km from the city.

=== Trade and services ===
The main trading floors in the city for a long time remained markets (bazaars), the number of which reached 28 in 2014. The largest of these are the Shygys and Central markets. The city administration is working on the opening of communal mini-markets for the products of local producers and gardeners-summer residents.

The annual growth in retail turnover remains. If in 2012 and 2013 it reached 309.3 and 317.9 billion tenge, respectively, then in 2015 it rose to 391.8 billion tenge.

Since the 2000s, there has been a trend of re-equipping open-air bazaars into indoor pavilions and the construction of shopping and entertainment centers. In 1998, the Bayzharkinov entrepreneurs built one of the first major shopping centers in the city - Nurdaulet. In the following years, several more shopping and entertainment centers appeared: Mega Shygys (2002), Alatau (2007), KeruenCity (2009, formerly Mega Aktobe), Alia Bazary (2011, formerly Alia Center), CITY Shopping Center (2015). There is a wholesale center supermarket "Dastarkhan".

== Education ==
Aktobe is host to a number of state and private institutions of higher learning, including Zhubanov University (formerly Aktobe State University) and the West Kazakhstan Medical University. The military of Kazakhstan also maintains a pilot school in the city. During the Soviet era many pilots were trained there. Aktobe Art School is one of the most respected institutions which work together with UNESCO.

== Science and innovation ==
Aktobe is a large scientific center. According to the Department of Statistics of the Aktobe region (2009), the volume of scientific and technical work in the city reached 336 million tenge (440 million tenge in the region). Research and development expenses amounted to 476 million tenge (489 million tenge in the region), including: for basic research - 8 million tenge, for applied research - 465 million tenge, for scientific and technical services - 2 million tenge. City enterprises have created 20 new technologies and technical facilities.

The level of innovation in production is low: 290 out of 303 enterprises of the city did not have any innovations (innovative activity - 4.3%). The volume of innovative products and services amounted to 1,893,742 thousand tenge (4,428,289 thousand tenge in the region) and 885,625 thousand tenge, respectively. The city enterprises spent 909,147 thousand tenge on technological innovations, which is significantly lower than the previous years.

== Healthcare ==
Consultation and diagnostic clinic number 2 in the old part of the city The Health Department is in charge of regulating the protection of citizens' health, medical and pharmaceutical science and education, the circulation of medicines, and the quality control of medical services in Aktobe and the Aktobe region. All regional, city and district medical institutions, organizations and healthcare enterprises are subordinate to the department.

The first city hospital opened in 1912. According to the data for 2019, there were 28 hospital facilities and 143 outpatient clinics in the city, in which 2,281 doctors and 4,002 medical personnel worked. With a growing population, the number of doctors and medical staff remained almost at the same level as in 2018.

Aktobe doctors have the ability to treat various types of diseases, including heart and kidney diseases. In 2014, a donor kidney transplant was performed for the first time in a regional hospital for patients with renal failure.

== Culture ==
In total there are six museums in the city. The oldest of them, the Aktobe Regional Museum of History and Local Lore, was opened in 1929 on the basis of the school museum and is considered one of the attractions of Aktobe. The memorial museum of Alia Moldagulova, which was opened on April 22, 1985, is located on the eponymous avenue, near the memorial complex of Moldagulova and the Alley of Heroes. The Rukhaniyat Museum was opened in 2011 on the ground floor of the Nur Gasyr Mosque. His activities are aimed at "the implementation of scientific and educational, research and educational activities." The Museum of Art and Decorative and Applied Arts since November 12, 2013 is located on the central avenue of the city, in the former registry office building.

=== Theaters and Philharmonic ===
There are two professional theaters in Aktobe. The oldest of them is the Drama Theater. T. Akhtanov was founded on the basis of the drama circle of railway workers in 1935 at the suggestion of the People's Commissar Temirbek Zhurgenov, and in 1997 the theater was named after the Kazakh-Soviet writer Takhavi Akhtanov, who was a native of Aktobe region.

There is also a children's puppet theater "Alakay". The Regional Philharmonic was founded in 1944, in 2004 it was allocated the building of the House of Culture of Chemists. In 2009, the House of Friendship was opened, the purpose of which is the development of cultures, national traditions and native languages of all the nations of the region. The Friendship House has a concert hall with 300 seats, a ceremonial hall and a choreography hall, a conference hall, an exhibition and a recording studio.

=== Libraries ===
The city has 18 libraries. The Lomonosov Central Library is located on Zhangeldin Street and has 5 branches in different parts of the city, including the Samuil Marshak Children's Library, and 6 branches in the villages of the city administration. The library system is managed by the city department of culture and language development. The library collection has literary works in Russian, German, English and French languages.

=== City holidays and festivals ===
Every year on May 28, City Day is celebrated. Various cultural events are organized in the park named after the First President, the water-green boulevard of Unity and Concord, the park named after A.S. Pushkin, in the regional philharmonic named after G. Zhubanova, the Palace of students and other venues.

Every year on May 1, in honor of the grand opening of the summer season of the fountains called "Fountain Splashes", the city administration organizes celebrations.

In 2001–2008, under the leadership of the frontman of the Adaptation group Ermen Erzhanov, the city hosted the "Sukhovei "festival of independent music, which was attended by many guests from the CIS countries. After its closure, a similar festival called "Indicator" was organized several times. In 2015, it was announced the resumption of the "Sukhovei ".

=== Cinemas ===
In pre-revolutionary Aktyubinsk there was one cinema hall (one of 13 cinema halls in Kazakhstan). In Soviet times, the cinemas "Zhuldyz" (1967; formerly "October"), "Mir" (1985), "Kazakhstan" (1961; the first wide-screen movie theater), "Sputnik" (1965), and "Pioneer" (formerly "Kultfront") and "Kultpohod", and in the park named after A. S. Pushkin there was a summer cinema. During the years of independence, the "Aina" shopping center was built on the site of the Oktyabr movie theater, and the Mir cinema was turned into the business center of the same name. The same fate befell the rest of the cinemas.

In 2002, in the building of the House of Culture of Railway Workers, built in 1928 and included in the list of historical and cultural monuments of Kazakhstan, the first post-Soviet Aktobe cinema, Lokomotiv, was opened. In 2009, the seven-screen multiplex cinema "Kinopark" was opened in the KeruenCity shopping and entertainment center (formerly MEGA Aktobe).

== Parks ==
During the existence of the USSR in the territory of Aviator park, Central park after. Lenin (present. Them. The First President) and in the park after A.S. Pushkin were opened amusement parks with various attractions. Currently in the park to them. Pushkin has about 20 attractions, another 10 modern attractions are installed in the town of "Ak bot" in the park.

In the past, an amusement park opened in the city every summer. In the 2010s, as part of the general reconstruction of Aktobe Central Park, which was renamed in honor of Nursultan Nazarbayev, outdated attractions, including the Ferris wheel, were dismantled. Instead, the" Captain Brig" entertainment center was built, worth $10 million, on the territory of which carousels and roller coasters were installed, and in the main pavilion with an area of 1150 m^{2} there were children's game attractions. "Captain Brig" is distinguished by the relative high cost of tickets for paid attractions and a small amount of free entertainment.

Entertainment centers for children are located in the courtyard of the Nurdaulet shopping center and inside MEGA Aktobe. In the Happylon entertainment center in MEGA with an area of 2200 m^{2}, about 130 attractions and gaming machines were installed, and on the playground near Nurdaulet, in addition to traditional slides and attractions, about 10 years (until 2016) existed for the only mini-zoo in the city.

Park of Health (Densaýlyq saıabaǵy) was opened in 2017. There are mini-football pitch, basketball pitch and other athletic facilities.

== Architecture ==
After the territories of modern Kazakhstan were annexed to the Russian Empire, due to the need for strong points and retail outlets, many cities appeared, one of which was Aktobe. In the architecture of the cities of Southern Kazakhstan, the influence of the Central Asian khanates is traced, and the settlements in the west and north-west were typically Russian provincial cities. These cities were built on the basis of master plans drawn up by Russian topographers. The first master plan of Aktobe was developed in 1874. Eclecticism is inherent in Aktobe architecture - new buildings are adjacent to houses built in the Soviet period, occasionally there are buildings that have survived from pre-revolutionary times. One of the oldest buildings in the city - the Russian-Kyrgyz women's school, built in 1894, is located on Aiteke bi. Today this building is occupied by the" Shahrizad "restaurant. The building of the former House of Culture of Railway Workers (now the Lokomotiv Cinema), built in 1928 in the constructivist style, is included in the list of historical and cultural monuments of Kazakhstan of republican significance.

== Monuments ==
The city has a large number of registered monuments, memorial plaques, large and small sculptural forms, and memorials. During the years of independence of Kazakhstan alone, 28 monuments and memorial complexes were erected in Aktobe. There is a real cult of the famous sniper Alia Moldagulova - a memorial complex and a monument were built, one of the central avenues was named in her honor, a personal museum was opened. The monument to Alia Moldagulova (1960) and the bust of cosmonaut Viktor Patsaev (1976) are among the monuments of history and culture of Kazakhstan of republican significance. One of the noteworthy monuments is the 19-meter granite Obelisk of Glory in honor of Aktobe residents who fell in battles for their homeland during the Civil War and World War II with eternal flame, dedicated to the fighters for the establishment of Soviet power and who died in the Great Patriotic War. In 1983, in front of him, a monument to V.I. Lenin was unveiled on the main square of the city (because of this, the obelisk was moved to another place), which then gave way to the monument to the khan of the Small Zhuz Abulkhair, sculptor E. Sergebaev. In 2008, the city hosted the grand opening of the monument to the heroes of the trilogy Abdijamil Nurpeisov "Blood and Sweat" - the first monument in Kazakhstan dedicated to literary characters.

== Planetarium ==
Aktobe Planetarium is the first planetarium in Kazakhstan. For a long time it was the only one in the country. The planetarium building with a domed hall was built by Moscow specialists in Pioneer Park at the intersection of Nekrasov and Frunze Streets. Until 2001, the permanent leader of the planetarium was Nikolai Pavlovich Zafiris. The "Star Hall" of the planetarium with a 10-meter dome allows visitors to demonstrate various astronomical phenomena: solar and lunar eclipses, meteor showers, halo, sunrise and sunset, panorama of Baikonur. This room also hosts lectures on astronomy and astronautics. From 1967 to 2012, about 1.5 million people visited the planetarium. The main visitors to the planetarium are schoolchildren, then students and adults.

== Sports ==
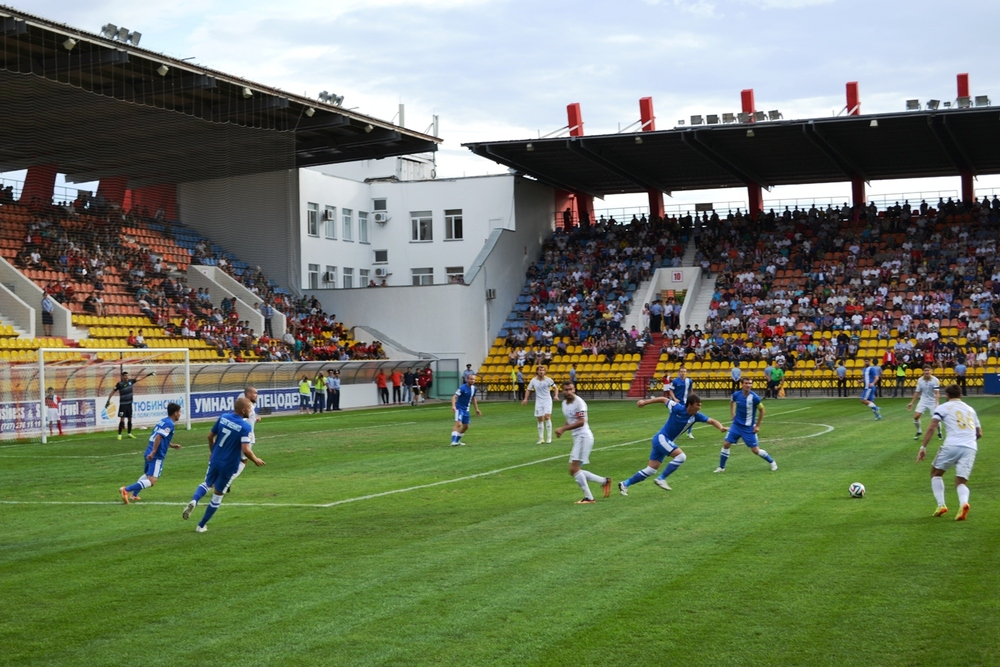
Central Stadium

The city sent a bandy team to the Spartakiade 2009 and is home to football club FC Aktobe. Football is one of the most popular sports in the city. Fans of the local club "Aktobe" organized the famous ultras group "13th sector". In 2013, according to a survey of the sports information portal Vesti.kz, Aktobe was recognized as "the most football city in Kazakhstan." Central Stadium. Koblandy batyr was built in 1975 and complies with UEFA standards. On March – October, the city football club "Aktobe" holds matches, which several times in a row became the champion of Kazakhstan and 9 times the most visited club in the country (185.7 thousand spectators visited home and away matches of the club in 2014). The club is financed from the city budget, in 2015 the amount of financing amounted to 3 billion tenge (2.3 billion tenge in 2010). In 2019, the Aktobe football club (for the first time since 1997) was forced to leave the Kazakhstan Premier League and dropped into the first league. One year later, in 2020, FC Aktobe returned to the Premier League.

== Infrastructure ==
=== Transport ===
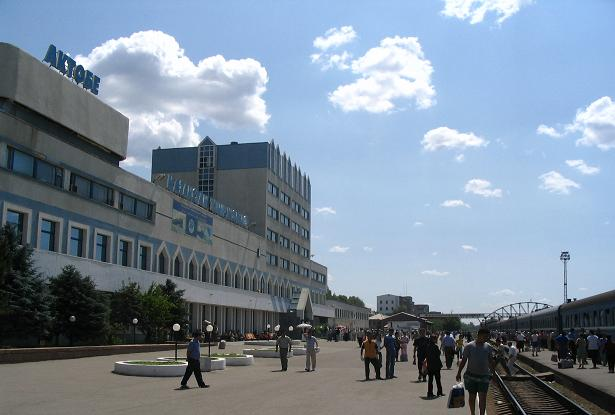
The railway station in Aktobe

Aktobe maintains international rail service with Moscow (via Saratov), Bishkek, and Tashkent, as well as daily domestic service to Aktau, Atyrau, Almaty and Astana.

Aktobe Airport offers flights to Moscow, Almaty, Astana, Atyrau, Shymkent and Aktau.

Bus service connects Aktobe with villages in Aktobe Region and across the border with Russia.

=== Energy and utilities ===
The Aktobe Field has an estimated reserve of 1.17 billion barrels of crude oil, and was being developed as of 2007 by the CNPC/AktobeMunaiGaz consortium. Smaller German and American joint ventures were also involved in oil extraction projects in the region.

Major oil and natural gas pipelines transect Aktobe and the surrounding region. The 400 km (250 mi) Keniyak-Orsk pipeline, with an annual capacity of 7.5 million tons, carries oil from the Aktobe fields to a refinery in Orsk, Russia. The Kazakhstan-China Pipeline has transported oil from Aktobe's fields to Atyrau since 2003. The Keniyak-Kumkol phase of the pipeline was scheduled for completion in 2011, to link Aktobe's oil fields to the Atasu-Alashankou pipeline supplying crude oil to Xinjiang. Aktobe is connected to the Bukhara-Urals natural gas pipeline.

== Notable people ==
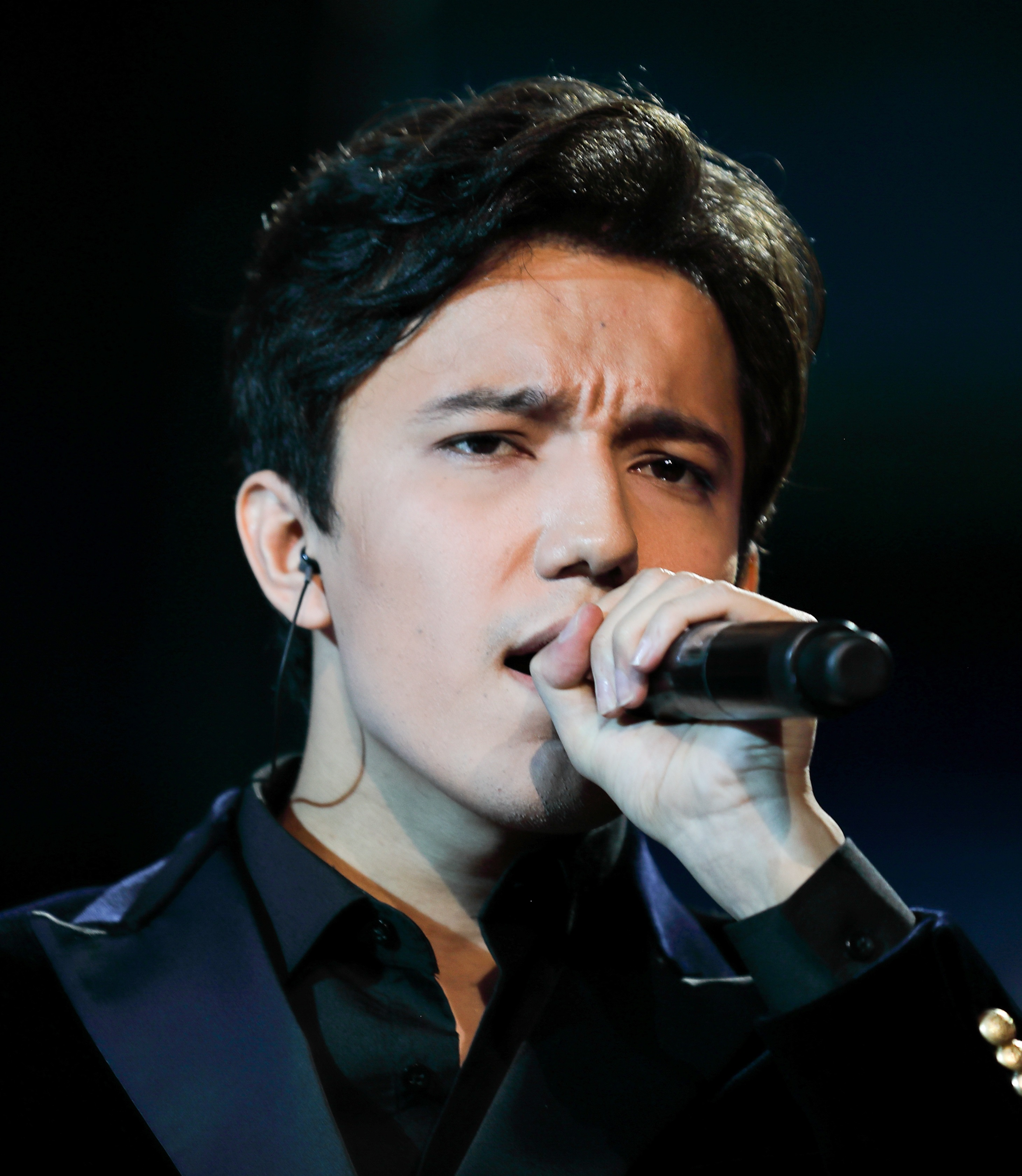
Dimash Qudaibergen, 2019

- Dimash Kudaibergen (born 1994), singer.
- Konstantin Lokhanov (born 1998), Russian junior world champion and Olympic sabre fencer living in the United States
- Yury Lonchakov (born 1965), Russian cosmonaut
- Alexander Mikaberidze (born 1978), Georgian Napoleonic historian
- Rashid Nezhmetdinov (1912–1974), International Master and 5-time winner of the Russian Chess Championship
- Viktor Ivanovich Patsayev (1933–1971), cosmonaut
- Valeri Liukin (born 1966), Kazakh-American 2x gold medalist, Olympic gymnastics (Seoul 1988) & father/coach to 2008 Olympic Gymnastics champion Nastia Liukin
- Assylbek Yensepov (born 1980), musician
- Zhalgas Zhumagulov (born 1988), MMA fighter
- Zülfia Süleimenova (born 1990), government minister
- Sabina Altynbekova (born 1996), volleyball player

== Events ==
The VII Asian-Pacific Astronomy Olympiad took place in Aktobe in November 2011.

== See also ==
- Demographics of Kazakhstan
- Economy of Kazakhstan
- List of schools in Kazakhstan
- Education in Kazakhstan
- Communications in Kazakhstan
- Transport in Kazakhstan
- Aktobe Airport
- Radio Tandem

== Sources ==
- Aktobe - Gorod Slavnoi Istorii. Komitet po upravleniyu zemel'nimi resursami ministyerstva cel'skogo khozyaistva Pespubliki Kazakhstana (Комземресурсы). Astana, Kazakhstan 1999. (Russian)
