= Radio Tandem (Kazakhstan) =

Radio Tandem is a local radio of Kazakhstan operating at FM frequencies of 103.60 (Atyrau) and 104.70 (Aktobe).
