= Deaths in November 2010 =

The following is a list of notable deaths in November 2010.

Entries for each day are listed alphabetically by surname. A typical entry lists information in the following sequence:

- Name, age, country of citizenship at birth, subsequent country of citizenship (if applicable), reason for notability, cause of death (if known), and reference.

== November 2010 ==
=== 1 ===
- Tom Allison, 89, English footballer.
- Mihai Chițac, 81, Romanian general, Minister of Interior (1989–1990), after long illness.
- Julia Clements, 104, English flower arranger and author.
- Monica Johnson, 64, American novelist and screenwriter (Lost in America, Modern Romance), esophageal cancer.
- Herbert Krug, 73, German equestrian, Olympic gold medalist (1984), amyotrophic lateral sclerosis.
- Ed Litzenberger, 78, Canadian ice hockey player (Chicago Blackhawks).
- Charlie O'Donnell, 78, American announcer (Wheel of Fortune), heart failure.
- Shannon Tavarez, 11, American actress (The Lion King), leukemia.
- Gaston Vandermeerssche, 89, Belgian partisan, leader of World War II Dutch underground intelligence, subject of Gaston's War, natural causes.
- Diana Wellesley, Duchess of Wellington, 88, British aristocrat and intelligence officer.

=== 2 ===
- Bhikari Bal, 81, Indian singer.
- Rudolf Barshai, 86, Russian conductor and viola player.
- Sarah Doron, 88, Israeli politician and government minister.
- Andy Irons, 32, American professional surfer.
- Clyde King, 86, American baseball player (Brooklyn Dodgers, Cincinnati Reds) and manager (New York Yankees).
- Romualdas Krikščiūnas, 80, Lithuanian Roman Catholic prelate, Bishop and Apostolic Administrator of Panevėžys (1973–1983).
- Kalim Sharafi, 86, Indian Bengali language singer.
- Jule Sugarman, 83, American educator, creator and director of the Head Start Program, cancer.
- Sumiko Watanabe, 93, Japanese Olympic sprinter.
- Ken Yuasa, 95, Japanese World War II surgeon, heart failure.

=== 3 ===
- Petros Hanna Issa Al-Harboli, 64, Iraqi Chaldean Catholic Bishop of Zakho (since 2001).
- Kees Bakker, 79, Dutch zoologist.
- Alfons Benedikter, 92, Austrian politician.
- Jerry Bock, 81, American musical theater composer (Fiddler on the Roof, Fiorello!), heart failure.
- Kenneth Brown, 77, American academic, chairman of first undergraduate peace studies program in the United States (1980–2005).
- Karen Chandler, 87, American singer.
- Viktor Chernomyrdin, 72, Russian politician, Prime Minister (1992–1998), Ambassador to Ukraine (2001–2009), cancer.
- Jim Clench, 61, Canadian bass guitarist (April Wine, Bachman–Turner Overdrive), lung cancer.
- Bill Colvin, 75, Canadian Olympic bronze medal-winning (1956) ice hockey player.
- Hotep Idris Galeta, 69, South African jazz pianist, composer and lecturer, asthma attack.
- Purushottama Lal, 81, Indian writer.
- Sonia Pottinger, 79, Jamaican record producer.
- Pentti Uotinen, 79, Finnish Olympic ski jumper.
- Dudley Williams, 73, British biochemist.

=== 4 ===
- Sparky Anderson, 76, American baseball player and manager (Cincinnati Reds, Detroit Tigers), member of Baseball Hall of Fame, complications from dementia.
- Raúl Chávez, 71, Mexican footballer.
- Ron Cockerill, 75, English footballer (Grimsby Town, Huddersfield Town), natural causes.
- Jean Compagnon, 94, French Army General and author.
- Ophelia Dimalanta, 76, Filipino poet, hypertension.
- Antoine Duquesne, 69, Belgian politician.
- Viola Fischerová, 75, Czech poet and translator.
- James Freud, 51, Australian vocalist and bassist (Models) and solo artist, suicide.
- John Greene, 90, American football player (Detroit Lions), after short illness.
- Michelle Nicastro, 50, American singer, actress (When Harry Met Sally...) and voice actress (The Swan Princess), lung cancer.
- Rudy Regalado, 67, Venezuelan percussionist and bandleader (El Chicano), complications of pneumonia.
- Charles Reynolds, 78, American magician, liver cancer.
- Noel Taylor, 97, American Emmy Award-winning costume designer.
- Aleksandr Zõbin, 59, Soviet Olympic sailor.

=== 5 ===
- Martin Baum, 86, American talent agent (Creative Artists Agency), President of ABC Pictures (1968–1971).
- Jutta Burggraf, 58, German Roman Catholic theologian and professor (University of Navarre).
- Antonio Cárdenas Guillén, 48, Mexican drug lord, shot.
- Barry Chevannes, 70, Jamaican sociologist and anthropologist.
- Jill Clayburgh, 66, American actress (An Unmarried Woman, Starting Over, Dirty Sexy Money), chronic leukemia.
- Hajo Herrmann, 97, German Luftwaffe bomber pilot and lawyer.
- Charles McDowell Jr., 84, American journalist and syndicated columnist, complications from a stroke.
- Midge the Sea Lion, 25, American sea lion (Oklahoma City Zoo), euthanized.
- Randy Miller, 39, American drummer (The Myriad), bone cancer.
- Rozsika Parker, 64, British art historian and psychotherapist, cancer.
- Adrian Păunescu, 67, Romanian author, poet and politician.
- Martin Starkie, 87, British actor and writer.
- David Steuart, 94, Canadian politician, Saskatchewan MLA (1962–1977) and Leader of the Opposition (1971–1976), Senator (1975–1991).
- Henriette van Lynden-Leijten, 60, Dutch diplomat, cancer.
- Shirley Verrett, 79, American operatic mezzo-soprano, heart failure.

=== 6 ===
- Fernando Bastos de Ávila, 92, Brazilian Roman Catholic priest, Vice-Chancellor (Pontifícia Universidade Católica), member of Academy of Letters, cancer.
- Ezard Haußmann, 75, German actor, cancer.
- Peter Hilton, 87, British mathematician.
- Walter Isard, 91, American economist, founder of regional science.
- Jo Myong-rok, 82, North Korean military official, First Vice-chairman of the National Defense Commission (since 2009), heart disease.
- Motoichi Kumagai, 101, Japanese photographer.
- Robert Lipshutz, 88, American politician, White House Counsel (1977–1979).
- Siddhartha Shankar Ray, 90, Indian politician, Chief Minister of West Bengal (1972–1977), Governor of Punjab (1986–1989), renal failure.
- Michael Seifert, 86, Soviet-born Nazi war criminal, complications from a fall.
- Jay Van Noy, 82, American baseball player (1951 St. Louis Cardinals).

=== 7 ===
- Kurt Baier, 93, Austrian philosopher.
- George Estock, 86, American baseball player (Boston Braves).
- Chris Goudge, 75, British Olympic athlete.
- Domingo Maza Zavala, 88, Venezuelan economist, President of the Central Bank of Venezuela (1997–2004).
- Yoshinobu Nishizaki, 75, Japanese anime producer (Space Battleship Yamato), fall from boat.
- Smaro Stefanidou, 97, Greek actress, heart failure.
- Hedy Stenuf, 88, Austrian Olympic figure skater.

=== 8 ===
- András Ádám-Stolpa, 89, Hungarian tennis, basketball and ice hockey player.
- Gregorio Barradas Miravete, 28, Mexican politician, Mayor-elect of Rodríguez Clara, Veracruz, shot.
- Richard Bing, 101, German-born American cardiologist.
- Fred Blankemeijer, 84, Dutch footballer.
- Philip Carlo, 61, American crime author, amyotrophic lateral sclerosis.
- Quintin Dailey, 49, American basketball player (Chicago Bulls, Los Angeles Clippers, Seattle SuperSonics), cardiovascular disease.
- Disque Deane, 89, American financier, pneumonia.
- Jack Levine, 95, American artist.
- Sam Holmes, 94, American Negro league baseball player.
- Emilio Eduardo Massera, 85, Argentine admiral, member of the 1976 Argentine coup d'état, cardiovascular arrest.
- Addison Powell, 89, American actor (Dark Shadows, The Thomas Crown Affair, Three Days of the Condor).
- Mikhail Savitsky, 88, Belarusian painter.
- George Solomos, 85, American editor and writer.
- Jean White, 69, British pastor and missionary, pancreatic cancer.
- Tim Womack, 76, English footballer (Derby County, Workington).

=== 9 ===
- Elizabeth Carnegy, Baroness Carnegy of Lour, 85, British academic and life peer.
- John Cunneen, 78, New Zealand Roman Catholic prelate, Bishop of Christchurch (1995–2007).
- Robin Day, 95, British furniture designer.
- Robert Donatucci, 58, American politician, member of the Pennsylvania House of Representatives (since 1980), sleep apnea.
- Reginald Hollis, 78, Canadian Anglican prelate, Bishop of Montreal (1975–1990).
- Albert Wesley Johnson, 87, Canadian civil servant, President of Canadian Broadcasting Corporation (1975–1982), after long illness.
- Ektor Kaknavatos, 90, Greek poet.
- Amos Lavi, 57, Israeli actor, lung cancer.
- Herman Liebaers, 91, Belgian linguist.
- Rolf Pettersson, 84, Swedish ice hockey player.
- Lursakdi Sampatisiri, 91, Thai businesswoman and politician, first female Minister of Transport (1976–1977).

=== 10 ===
- Georges Aeschlimann, 90, Swiss cyclist.
- Mustafa Altıntaş, 71, Turkish footballer, cancer.
- Dino De Laurentiis, 91, Italian film producer (Dune, Army of Darkness, Conan the Barbarian).
- Theo Doyer, 54, Dutch Olympic field hockey player, amyotrophic lateral sclerosis.
- Jim Farry, 56, Scottish football administrator, Chief Executive of the Scottish Football Association (1990–1999), heart attack.
- Phillip Hoffman, 80, American surfer, pulmonary disease.
- Donald S. Kellermann, 83, American journalist and opinion researcher, liver cancer.
- Andreas Kirchner, 57, German Olympic gold (1984) and bronze (1980) medal-winning bobsledder.
- Attila Kovács, 70, Hungarian Olympic fencer.
- Edmund Kuempel, 68, American politician, myocardial infarction.
- Tiger Lance, 70, South African cricketer, injuries sustained in a traffic collision.
- James Munnik, 57, South African cricketer.
- Dave Niehaus, 75, American sportscaster (Seattle Mariners), 2008 Ford C. Frick Award recipient, heart attack.
- Nicolo Rizzuto, 86, Italian-born Canadian mafia leader (Rizzuto crime family), shot.
- Einar Sæter, 92, Norwegian triple jumper, resistance member, newspaper editor and writer.

=== 11 ===
- Pankaj Advani, 45, Indian film director, editor, screenwriter, photographer, theatre director, and painter, cardiac arrest.
- Carlos Edmundo de Ory, 87, Spanish poet, leukemia.
- John Elliott, 66, American football player (New York Jets), cancer.
- Daud Ibrahim, 63, Malaysian Olympic cyclist.
- Carroll Pratt, 89, American sound engineer, pioneer of laugh track, natural causes.
- Marie Osborne Yeats, 99, American silent movie actress.

=== 12 ===
- Des Alwi, 82, Indonesian historian, businessman, and public intellectual, adopted son of Mohammad Hatta, heart failure.
- Stanisław Bobak, 54, Polish Olympic ski jumper.
- Ernst von Glasersfeld, 93, Austrian-born American philosopher (radical constructivism).
- Henryk Górecki, 76, Polish composer (Symphony of Sorrowful Songs), after long illness.
- William Hohri, 83, American activist, source behind Civil Liberties Act of 1988, Alzheimer's disease.
- Theodore W. Kheel, 96, American labor negotiator.
- Karl Plutus, 106, Estonian jurist and centenarian.

=== 13 ===
- Noah Augustine, 39, Canadian indigenous leader, road incident.
- Farid Baghlani, 41–42, Iranian serial killer and rapist, hanged.
- Luis García Berlanga, 89, Spanish film director, natural causes.
- George Binks, 96, American baseball player (Washington Senators, Philadelphia Athletics).
- Winfried Brugger, 60, German academic lawyer.
- Jim Deane, 82, Australian football player.
- Norman Dennis, 81, British sociologist, leukaemia.
- Witold Hatka, 71, Polish politician, traffic collision.
- Ken Iman, 71, American football player (Green Bay Packers, Los Angeles Rams).
- W. Henry Maxwell, 75, American politician and Baptist minister.
- Claudio Obregón, 75, Mexican actor, respiratory failure.
- Nathan Oliveira, 81, American painter.
- D. V. S. Raju, 81, Indian film producer, short illness.
- Allan Sandage, 84, American astronomer, pancreatic cancer.
- Richard Van Genechten, 80, Belgian cyclist.

=== 14 ===
- Hal Bamberger, 86, American baseball player (New York Giants).
- Sir Gordon Bisson, 91, New Zealand jurist.
- Vincent Broderick, 90, English cricketer.
- Lew Carpenter, 78, American football player (Detroit Lions, Green Bay Packers, Philadelphia Eagles).
- Eugenio Galliussi, 95, Italian cyclist.
- Akira Mikazuki, 89, Japanese legal scholar and Minister of Justice.
- Wes Santee, 78, American Olympic track athlete (1952 Summer Olympics), cancer.
- Bobbi Sykes, 67, Australian Aboriginal rights activist.

=== 15 ===
- Helen Boehm, 89, American businesswoman, complications from cancer and Parkinson's disease.
- Ángel Cabrera, 71, Uruguayan footballer.
- Nikol Ġużeppi Cauchi, 81, Maltese Roman Catholic prelate, Bishop of Gozo (1972–2005).
- Moira Deady, 88, Irish actor (The Riordans, Glenroe).
- Edmond Amran El Maleh, 93, Moroccan writer and intellectual.
- Larry Evans, 78, American chess grandmaster and author, complications following gallbladder operation.
- Paul Jiang Taoran, 84, Chinese Roman Catholic prelate, Bishop of Zhengding, heart disease.
- Toswel Kaua, 63, Solomon Islands politician, Deputy Prime Minister (2007), after long illness.
- Nimr al-Khatib, c. 92, Palestinian educator and writer.
- Ed Kirkpatrick, 66, American baseball player (California Angels, Kansas City Royals, Pittsburgh Pirates), throat cancer.
- Maria Dolors Maestre i Pal, 80–81, Andorran philanthropist.
- W. Howard Lester, 75, American businessman, former CEO of Williams-Sonoma, Inc., cancer.
- Sir Cassam Moollan, 84, Mauritian Chief Justice (1982–1988).
- Imre Polyák, 78, Hungarian Greco-Roman wrestler.
- Hugh Prather, 72, American self-help author, apparent heart attack.
- William Edwin Self, 89, American production manager (Batman, Lost in Space, Voyage to the Bottom of the Sea), heart attack.

=== 16 ===
- Louis Bisdee, 100, Australian politician, member of the Tasmanian Legislative Council (1959–1981).
- Paul Calello, 49, American investment banker, non-Hodgkin's lymphoma.
- Britton Chance, 97, American biochemist, biophysicist and Olympic sailor.
- Ronni Chasen, 64, American publicist (Hans Zimmer, Michael Douglas), shot.
- Ragnhild Magerøy, 90, Norwegian writer.
- Donald Nyrop, 98, American CEO of Northwest Airlines (1954–1976), Administrator of the Federal Aviation Administration.
- Mimi Perrin, 84, French jazz singer and pianist.
- Ilie Savu, 90, Romanian footballer and coach, hepatic cirrhosis.
- Wyngard Tracy, 58, Filipino talent manager, stroke.
- Wong Tin-lam, 83, Chinese screenwriter, producer, director and actor, organ failure.

=== 17 ===
- Giorgi Arsenishvili, 68, Georgian mathematician and politician, myocardial infarction.
- Olavo Rodrigues Barbosa, 87, Brazilian footballer.
- Isabelle Caro, 28, French anorexic model.
- Johnny Simpson, 88, New Zealand rugby player.
- N. Viswanathan, 81, Indian actor, heart attack.

=== 18 ===
- Freddy Beras-Goico, 69, Dominican television producer, comedian, writer and actor, gastric cancer.
- Jochem Bobeldijk, 90, Dutch Olympic sprint canoer.
- Jim Cruickshank, 69, Scottish footballer.
- Brian G. Marsden, 73, British astronomer, after long illness.
- Donald Mitchell, 55 Australian weightlifter.
- Abraham Serfaty, 84, Moroccan pro-democracy activist.
- Dito Shanidze, 73, Georgian Olympic silver medal-winning (1968, 1972) weightlifter.
- Gaye Stewart, 87, Canadian ice hockey player.
- Mackenzie Taylor, 32, British comedian, suicide by drug overdose.

=== 19 ===
- Pat Burns, 58, Canadian ice hockey coach (Montreal Canadiens, New Jersey Devils), lung cancer.
- Byron Duckenfield, 93, British World War II Air Force pilot.
- Piotr Hertel, 74, Polish composer.
- Jamuna Nishad, 57, Indian politician, traffic collision.
- Ole Bjørn Støle, 60, Norwegian judge.
- Bob Wheeler, 58, American Olympic athlete.
- Atama Zedkaia, 79, Marshallese tribal leader, paramount chief of Majuro.

=== 20 ===
- Mir Shawkat Ali, 83, Bangladesh general.
- Laurie Bembenek, 52, American convicted murderer, liver and kidney failure.
- Roxana Briban, 39, Romanian soprano, apparent suicide by exsanguination.
- Santha Devi, 85, Indian actress.
- Chalmers Johnson, 79, American scholar and author.
- Rob Lytle, 56, American football player (Michigan Wolverines, Denver Broncos), heart attack.
- Robert Earl Maxwell, 86, American judge.
- Danny McDevitt, 78, American baseball player (Brooklyn Dodgers).
- Little Smokey Smothers, 71, American blues guitarist and singer, natural causes.
- Ruth Springford, 89, Canadian actress (5 Card Stud, Hangin' In), after short illness.
- Heinz Weiss, 89, German actor (The Great Escape).
- Jim Yardley, 64, English cricketer.

=== 21 ===
- José Antônio Rezende de Almeida Prado, 67, Brazilian composer and pianist, pulmonary edema.
- Rosaura Andreu, 92, American actress.
- Theodore Bibb, 92, American jazz drummer.
- Willis Burks II, 75, American actor (King of California, Law & Order).
- Silverio Cavazos, 41, Mexican politician, Governor of Colima (2005–2009), shot.
- Takaharu Kondo, 66, Japanese jurist, member of the Supreme Court, pneumonia.
- Steve Kuczek, 85, American baseball player (Boston Braves).
- Norris Church Mailer, 61, American author and model, gastrointestinal cancer.
- David Nolan, 66, American political activist, Libertarian Party founder, stroke.
- Prince Chunk, 10, American obese cat, heart disease.
- Margaret Taylor-Burroughs, 95, American museum founder (DuSable Museum of African American History).
- Raghavan Thirumulpad, 90, Indian Ayurvedic scholar and physician.

=== 22 ===
- Kenneth Burton, 84, British biochemist.
- Jean Cione, 82, American baseball player (Rockford Peaches).
- Frank Fenner, 95, Australian scientist.
- Jun Fukamachi, 64, Japanese musician.
- Julien Guiomar, 82, French film actor.
- David Lam, 87, Canadian politician, Lieutenant Governor of British Columbia (1988–1995), prostate cancer.
- Len Lunde, 74, Canadian ice hockey player (Detroit Red Wings, Chicago Blackhawks, Edmonton Oilers), heart condition.
- Winston Murray, 69, Guyanese politician, former Deputy Prime Minister, and Minister of Trade, Tourism and Industry.
- Urbano Navarrete Cortés, 90, Spanish Roman Catholic priest, Cardinal since 2007.
- Tom Underwood, 56, American baseball player (Philadelphia Phillies, New York Yankees, Oakland A's), pancreatic cancer.

=== 23 ===
- Mauro Alice, 84, Brazilian film editor, pneumonia.
- Greg Coleman, 47, American lawyer, Solicitor General of Texas (1999–2001), plane crash.
- Nassos Daphnis, 96, Greek-born American artist, Alzheimer's disease.
- Wolfgang Hellrigl, 69, German philatelist.
- Joyce Howard, 88, British actress (The Night Has Eyes, They Met in the Dark), natural causes.
- Pavel Lednyov, 67, Russian modern pentathlete.
- Ingrid Pitt, 73, Polish-born British actress (The Vampire Lovers, Countess Dracula, Where Eagles Dare), heart failure.
- Kananginak Pootoogook, 75, Canadian Inuk artist, complications from surgery.
- Don Samuel, 86, American football player.
- James Tyler, 70, American lutenist.
- George Otto Wirz, 81, American Roman Catholic prelate, Auxiliary Bishop of Madison (1977–2004).

=== 24 ===
- Thomas J. Ahrens, 74, American geophysicist.
- Peter Christopherson, 55, British musician (Coil, Throbbing Gristle) and graphic artist (Hipgnosis), natural causes.
- Annie Lee Cooper, 100, American civil rights activist.
- A. Arthur Giddon, 101, American lawyer and jurist.
- Huang Hua, 97, Chinese politician, Foreign Minister (1976–1982).
- Valentin Ivakin, 80, Russian footballer and football manager.
- Lim Chong Eu, 91, Malaysian politician, Chief Minister of Penang (1969–1990).
- Molly Luft, 66, German prostitute, cancer.
- Michael Samuels, 90, British philologist.
- Andy Schoettle, 77, American Olympic sailor.
- Sergio Valech, 83, Chilean Roman Catholic prelate, Auxiliary Bishop of Santiago de Chile (1973–2003).
- Norm Winningstad, 85, American technology entrepreneur, founder of Floating Point Systems, suicide by gunshot.

=== 25 ===
- Charlie Atkinson, 77, English footballer, ill-health following a fall .
- Alfred Balk, 80, American journalist, former editor of the Columbia Journalism Review, cancer.
- Tony Dixon, 52, Irish disc jockey and blogger, after short illness. (death announced on this date)
- Bernard Matthews, 80, British businessman (Bernard Matthews Farms).
- Doris McCarthy, 100, Canadian artist.
- James Morrison, 68, American politician, member of the Kansas House of Representatives (since 1992).
- Yaroslav Pavulyak, 62, Ukrainian poet.
- Colin Slee, 65, British Church of England prelate, Dean of Southwark Cathedral, pancreatic cancer.
- Ann Southam, 73, Canadian composer.

=== 26 ===
- Gavin Blyth, 41, British television producer, cancer.
- R. N. DeArmond, 99, American historian.
- James DiPaola, 57, American politician, Massachusetts House of Representatives (1993–1996), Sheriff of Middlesex County (1996–2010), suicide by gunshot.
- Mohammad Anwar Elahee, 81, Mauritian footballer and manager.
- Yara Gambirasio, 13, Italian student and gymnast.
- Maria Hellwig, 90, German yodeler and folk musician.
- Palle Huld, 98, Danish actor, believed to be inspiration for Tintin.
- Umanosuke Iida, 49, Japanese animator (Nausicaä of the Valley of the Wind, Castle in the Sky, Hellsing), lung cancer.
- Paraska Korolyuk, 71, Ukrainian political activist (Orange Revolution).
- Mario Pacheco, 60, Spanish music producer and photographer.
- Kevin Parry, 77, Australian businessman, traffic collision.
- Purcell Powless, 84, American tribal leader, chairman of the Oneida Nation of Wisconsin (1967–1990).
- Marjory Saunders, 97, Canadian Olympic archer.
- Vitthal Umap, 80, Indian musician.

=== 27 ===
- Steve Hill, 70, English footballer.
- Irvin Kershner, 87, American film director (The Empire Strikes Back, Never Say Never Again, RoboCop 2), lung cancer.
- Đorđe Lavrnić, 77, Yugoslav Olympic handball player.
- Bill Werle, 89, American baseball player (Pittsburgh Pirates, St. Louis Cardinals, Boston Red Sox).

=== 28 ===
- Jon D'Agostino, 81, Italian-born American comic book artist (Archie), bone cancer.
- Syoziro Asahina, 97, Japanese entomologist.
- Keir Clark, 100, Canadian politician, Prince Edward Island MLA for 3rd Kings (1948–1959; 1966–1970).
- Samuel T. Cohen, 89, American physicist, inventor of the neutron bomb, cancer.
- Cal Emery, 73, American baseball player and coach.
- Giorgos Fountas, 86, Greek actor, Alzheimer's disease.
- Svante Granlund, 89, Swedish ice hockey player.
- Frank Hanna, 86, Australian rules footballer.
- Vladimir Maslachenko, 74, Russian footballer, winner of the 1960 European Nations' Cup.
- Gil McDougald, 82, American baseball player (New York Yankees), prostate cancer.
- Katsuya Miyahira, 92, Japanese martial artist.
- Leslie Nielsen, 84, Canadian-born American actor (Airplane!, The Naked Gun, Forbidden Planet), pneumonia.
- Gene Polito, 92, American cinematographer (Futureworld, Up in Smoke, Lost in Space), esophageal cancer.
- Mahaveer Prasad, 71, Indian politician, after long illness.
- Renato Terra, 87, Italian actor and poet.

=== 29 ===
- Bella Akhmadulina, 73, Russian poet.
- Irena Anders, 90, Polish stage actress and singer.
- El Hijo de Cien Caras, 34, Mexican professional wrestler, shot.
- David Fleming, 70, British environmental writer
- John Gerrish, 100, American composer.
- Richard Goldman, 90, American philanthropist, founder of the Goldman Environmental Prize.
- Bob Holcomb, 88, American politician, Mayor of San Bernardino, California (1971–1985, 1989–1993), heart failure.
- Silvester Knipfer, 70, German Olympic sports shooter.
- Pete Langelle, 93, Canadian ice hockey player (Toronto Maple Leafs).
- John Mantle, 64, Scottish Episcopalian prelate, Bishop of Brechin (2005–2010).
- Al Masini, 80, American television producer, creator of Entertainment Tonight, Solid Gold and Star Search, melanoma.
- Mario Monicelli, 95, Italian film director, suicide by jumping.
- Steven Posner, 67, American corporate raider, boat collision.
- Majid Shahriari, Iranian quantum physicist, car bomb.
- Stephen Solarz, 70, American politician, U.S. Representative from New York (1975–1993), esophageal cancer.
- Sir Maurice Wilkes, 97, British computer scientist.

=== 30 ===
- Idris Ali, 70, Egyptian author.
- Daya Mata, 96, American spiritual leader, Self-Realization Fellowship president (1955–2010).
- Garry Gross, 73, American fashion photographer, heart attack.
- Peter Hofmann, 66, German operatic tenor, dementia and Parkinson's disease.
- Jim Kelley, 61, American sportswriter and television journalist (Sports Illustrated), pancreatic cancer.
- Gabriela Kownacka, 58, Polish actress (Rodzina zastępcza), breast cancer.
- Robert Potter, 101, British architect, Surveyor to the Fabric of St Paul's Cathedral
- Imre Sátori, 73, Hungarian footballer.
- Dave Skrien, 81, American CFL football player (Roughriders, Blue Bombers) and coach (BC Lions, Roughriders), complications from Alzheimer's disease.
- Ted Sorel, 74, American actor (Guiding Light, Law & Order), complications from Lyme disease.
- R. C. Stevens, 76, American baseball player (Pittsburgh Pirates, Washington Senators).
- Monty Sunshine, 82, British clarinetist (Chris Barber Orchestra).
