= Thomas Allison =

Thomas Al(l)ison may refer to:

- Thomas Allison (explorer) (fl. 1697), English Arctic voyager and diarist
- Tom Allison (Australian footballer) (born 1944), Australian rules footballer
- Tom Allison (English footballer) (1921–2010)
- Tom Allison (baseball) (born 1967), American baseball player and executive
- Tommy Allison (1875–1961), Scottish footballer
- Thomas Alison (painter) (1860–1931), painter

== See also ==
- Allison (surname)
- Thomas Allason (1790–1852), British architect
