= List of Washington Journal programs aired in May 1995 =

The C-SPAN news and interview program Washington Journal has been presented live every day of the year from January 4, 1995, through the present, with very few exceptions. Programs are typically a mix of politically themed interviews, viewer calls and emails, discussion of current events, and reviews of that morning's newspapers.

In the table below, guests are listed in alphabetical order, rather than the order in which they appeared on the program. They are also listed with the position or affiliation they held at the time of their appearance. f

== Table of programs ==
Date (w/link to video)	Approx. run time	Host(s)	Guests	Comments and summary
Monday, May 01, 1995	2 hr. 31 min.	Brian Lamb	David Horowitz (Editor, Heterodoxy); Jeffrey Klein (editor-in-chief, Mother Jones Magazine); Ellen R. Malcolm (Founder and President, EMILY's List);Julia Malone (White House Correspondent, Cox Newspapers); Sen. Richard C. Shelby (R-AL)	"In the first segment, Ms. Malone talked about current political issues, including the confirmation hearings for Dr. Foster. In the newspaper roundtable, Mr. Horowitz and Mr. Klein reviewed the current news topics. In a taped interview, Ms. Malcolm talked about Emily's List, an organization that helps raise money for pro-choice, Democratic female candidates. In a live interview, Senator Shelby talked about a Senate hearing about protecting federal buildings in the wake of the Oklahoma City bombing."
Tuesday, May 02, 1995	2 hr. 31 min.	Susan Swain	Judie Brown (President, American Life League); Christopher Connell (Correspondent, Associated Press); Colette Fraley (Correspondent, Congressional Quarterly); Thomas Gibson (President, National Foundation for Caricature and Cartoon); Leslie Harris (Public Policy Director, People for the American Way); Bret Schundler (Mayor [R], Jersey City, New Jersey); Rep. Barbara F. Vucanovich (R-NV); Rep. Ron Wyden (D-OR)	"In the first segment, Ms. Fraley talked about the politics of the confirmation hearings for Dr. Foster. Mr. Connell also talked about this and the debate over Medicare by telephone. In the newspaper roundtable, Mayor Schundler and Rep. Wyden discussed current news topics. In the point-counterpoint segment, Ms Harris and Ms. Brown debated the advisability of Dr. Foster's confirmation as surgeon general. In the next segment, Mr. Gibson talked about the new National Gallery of Caricature and Cartoon Art. In a telephone interview, Rep. Vucanovich talked about the House's “Corrections Day.” which will allow representatives to eliminate inefficient regulations."
Wednesday, May 03, 1995	2 hr. 36 min.	Steve Scully	Kenan Block (Correspondent, MacNeil/Lehrer NewsHour); Rep. Lincoln Díaz-Balart (R-FL); Rep. Cleo Fields (D-LA); Rep. James Kolbe (R-AZ); Lori Montenegro (Correspondent, Univision); David Ryder (Former Director, U.S. Mint); Raymond C. Sheppach (Executive Director, National Governors Association)	"In the first segment, Ms. Montenegro talked about the new U.S. policy on Cuban immigration. In a live interview, Mr. Block talked about Speaker Gingrich's decision to discontinue his daily news conferences. In the newspaper roundtable, Representatives Fields and Díaz-Balart discussed current news topics such as the Foster confirmation hearings. In the point-counterpoint segment, Rep. Kolbe and Mr. Ryder debate. In the last segment, Mr. Sheppach talked about a National Governors' Association report on fiscal conditions in states."
Thursday, May 04, 1995	3 hr. 1 min.	Lew Ketcham; Susan Swain	Robert "Bob" B. Blancato (Executive Director, White House Conference on Aging); Sen. Ben Nighthorse Campbell (R-CO); Richard Davidson (President, American Hospital Association); Sen. Patty Murray (D-WA); James Popkin (senior editor, U.S. News & World Report); John Rother (Legislative Affairs Director, American Association of Retired Persons)	"In the first segment, Mr. Popkin talked about the Senate Labor Committee hearings for Dr. Foster. In the newspaper roundtable, Senators Campbell and Murray discussed current news topics. In the point-counterpoint segment, Mr. Davidson and Mr. Rother debated the need for and method of Medicare reform. In the next segment, Mr. Blancato talked about the White House Conference on Aging scheduled for later that day."
Friday, May 05, 1995	3 hr. 9 min.	Connie Doebele; Susan Swain	Stuart Butler (Vice President, The Heritage Foundation); Thomas B. Edsall (National Politics Correspondent, Washington Post); Michael Isikoff (Correspondent, Newsweek); Richard Kogan (Representative, Center for Budget and Policy Priorities); Prof. Michael Mandelbaum (American Foreign Policy Program, Paul H. Nitze School of Advanced International Studies); Kevin Phillips (publisher and editor, American Political Report); Peter Rodman (National Services Program Director, Center for the National Interest)	"In the first segment, Mr. Isikoff talked about the latest in the Whitewater investigation. In the newspaper roundtable, Mr. Phillips and Mr. Edsall discussed the current news headlines. In the point-counterpoint segment, Mr. Mandelbaum and Mr. Rodman discussed President Clinton's upcoming trip to Russia. In the last segment, Mr. Butler and Mr. talked about Republican and Democratic plans for balancing the budget and cutting health care programs."
Saturday, May 06, 1995	1 hr. 30 min.	Lew Ketcham	James Austin (Executive Vice President, National Council on Crime and Delinquency); Meg Greenfield (editorial page editor, Washington Post); Chris Jennings (Domestic Policy Adviser, White House); Thomas A. Scully (President and CEO, Federation of American Hospitals); Jay Stephens (Former U.S. Attorney, District of Columbia)	"In the first segment, Ms. Greenfield talked about “the Drawing Board,” a collection of editorial cartoons that appear every Saturday in the Washington Post. In the point-counterpoint segment, Mr. Stephens and Mr. Austin debated the treatment of juvenile offenders by the justice system. In the newspaper roundtable segment, Mr. Scully and Mr. Jennings discussed the headline stories."
Sunday, May 07, 1995	1 hr. 59 min.	Steve Scully	R. Nicholas Burns (Former Deputy Assistant Secretary for Public Affairs, U.S. Department of State); Bob Cohn (White House Correspondent, Newsweek); Geoffrey Cowan (Communications Professor, University of California, Los Angeles); Ronald H. Nessen (Former White House Press Secretary); Hazel R. O'Leary (Secretary of the U.S. Department of Energy)	"In the first segment, Mr. Cohn previewed President Clinton's trip to Russia. Then, Mr. Burns also talked about the trip. In the newspaper roundtable, Mr. Cowan and Mr. Nessen discussed the current news headlines, including the anniversary celebrations of V-E Day. In the last segment, Secretary O'Leary talked about the important tasks performed by the Department of Energy."
Monday, May 08, 1995	2 hr. 2 min.	Connie Doebele	Joe Conason (executive editor, New York Observer); Francis Coombs Jr. (Editor, Washington Times); David Hogan (Historian, U.S. Army Center of Military History); Alfred Lott (Representative, World War II Commemoration Committee); Sybil Milton (Historian, U.S. Holocaust Memorial Museum)	"Via telephone, Lt. Col. Lott discussed the V-E Day Commemoration and how it is organized. Mr. Hogan and Ms. Milton discussed V-E Day and its significance for the U.S. and Europe. In the newspaper roundtable, Mr. Conason and Mr. Coombs discussed newspaper headlines from various papers across the country. close "
Tuesday, May 09, 1995	2 hr. 12 min.	Lew Ketcham	Douglass Bailey (Chairman, American Political Network); Claude Barfield (World Economy Project Director, American Enterprise Institute); Pat Choate (Director, Manufacturing Policy Project); Sen. Pete V. Domenici (R-NM); Sen. James Exon (D-NE); Dave McConnell (Congressional Correspondent, WTOP-Radio, Washington, D.C.); Rep. Jack Reed (D-RI); Rep. Christopher Shays (R-CT); David M. Wessel (Economics Correspondent, Wall Street Journal)	"Mr. Wessel discussed the week's budget debates in the House and Senate. Via remote link, Mr. Bailey discussed a new on-line service being put together by Hotline and National Journal called "Interactive Democracy". In the newspaper roundtable, Reps. Hays and Reed discussed headlines from various papers across the country. Via remote link, Senators Exon and Domenici discussed the budget markup scheduled to begin today. In the point-counterpoint discussion, Mr. Barfield and Mr. Choate debated current negotiations concerning the proposed World Trade Organization and discussed U.S.-Japan trade relations. Mr. McConnell talked about what is coming up on the House floor."
Wednesday, May 10, 1995	2 hr. 47 min.	Lew Ketcham	Fred Hiatt (Moscow Bureau Chief, Washington Post); Ken Kirk (Executive Director, Association of Metropolitan Sewerage Agencies);Rep. Steve Largent (R-OK); John Merline (Correspondent, Investor's Business Daily); Rep. Patsy Mink (D-HI); John Allen Paulos; Paul Schwartz (National Policy Coordinator Clean Water Action)	"Mr. Merline discussed the budget debate in the House and Senate. In the newspaper roundtable, Reps. Largent and Mink discussed headlines from various papers across the country. Via telephone, Mr. Hiatt discussed President Clinton's trip to Moscow. In the point-counterpoint discussion, Mr. Kirk and Mr. Schwartz discussed the Clean Water Act. Mr. Paulos discussed his book A Mathematician Reads the Newspaper."
Thursday, May 11, 1995	2 hr. 17 min.	Lew Ketcham	Stephen Green (Executive Director, Copley News Service); Robert D. Reischauer (Former Director, Congressional Budget Office); Rep. Pat Roberts (R-KA); State Rep. Daniel Silva (D-NM); Judith Lee Stone (President, Advocates for Highway and Auto Safety); Sen. Fred Thompson (R-TN)	"In the first segment, Mr. Green discussed the federal budget and the Senate and House Budget Committee hearings this week. In the newspaper roundtable, Mr. Reischauer, former Congressional Budget Office director, and freshman Republican Senator Thompson discussed President Clinton's trip to Russia and other headline stories. They were joined by remote connection by Rep. Roberts, chairman of the House Agriculture Committee, who talked about the committee markup of the 1995 Farm Bill. In the point-counterpoint segment, Mr. Silva and Ms. Stone debated the federal highway speed limit law."
Friday, May 12, 1995	2 hr. 30 min.	Brian Lamb	Barbara Cochran(Washington Bureau Chief, CBS); Georgie Anne Geyer (Syndicated Columnist, Universal Press Syndicate); Daniel Schorr (Senior Analyst, National Public Radio)	"In the first segment, Ms. Cochran talked about current news headlines, including possible congressional investigations into the Waco incident in 1993. In the newspaper roundtable, Ms. Geyer and Mr. Schorr reviewed current news headlines."
Saturday, May 13, 1995	1 hr. 30 min.	Steve Scully	Barry Jackson (Executive Director, House Republican Conference); Ronald A. Klain (Staff Director, Senate Democratic Policy Committee); Barry W. Lynn (Executive Director, Americans United for Separation of Church and State); Sean Piccoli (Correspondent, Washington Times); Michael Schwartz (Executive Director, Citizens for Educational Freedom)	"In the first segment, Mr. Piccoli talked about the heated debates in Congress over the past two weeks. In the point-counterpoint segment, Mr. Lynn and Mr. Schwartz discussed a program in Pennsylvania that would provide vouchers to parents to pay for the child's attendance at the school, public or private, of their choice. In the newspaper roundtable, Mr. Jackson and Mr. Klain examined the top news stories of the week. "
Sunday, May 14, 1995	2 hr. 1 min.	Steve Scully	William "Bill" J. Bennett (Co-Director, Empower America); Michael Duffy (Correspondent, Time Magazine ); Evelyn McPhail (Co-Bureau Chief, Republican National Committee); Rep. William "Bill" Blaine Richardson (D-NM)	"In the opening segment, Mr. Duffy talked about the congressional budget process. In the newspaper roundtable, Rep. Richardson and Ms. McPhail examined current news stories such as Medicare reform and the president's trip to Russia. In the last segment, Mr. Bennett talked about the Republican presidential nomination race."
Monday, May 15, 1995	2 hr. 29 min.	Brian Lamb	Susan Dentzer, (Economics Correspondent, U.S. News & World Report); Christopher Hitchens (Columnist, The Nation); Robert G. Kaiser (Editor, Washington Post); Madeleine M. Kunin (Deputy Secretary, U.S. Department of Education); Jack Nelson (Chief Correspondent, Washington Bureau, Los Angeles Times); Rep. Joe Scarborough (R-FL)	"In the first segment, Ms. Dentzer discussed the upcoming week in Congress, especially Medicare and the budget. In the newspaper roundtable, journalists Kaiser and Nelson talked about the headline stories. In the point-counterpoint segment, Ms. Kunin and Rep. Scarborough debated whether or not the Education Department should be eliminated. Mr. Hitchens discussed his article for June Vanity Fair on New York Times editorial writer Maureen Dowd."
Tuesday, May 16, 1995	2 hr. 1 min.	Susan Swain	Ron Brown (Secretary, U.S. Department of Commerce); Rep. Eva Clayton (D-NC); Rep. David Dreier (R-CA); Gov. Bill Graves (R-KS); Jon Healey (Correspondent, Congressional Quarterly); Richard Morin (Polling Director, Washington Post); Robert Mosbacher (Former Secretary, U.S. Department of Commerce)	"In the first segment, Mr. Healey talked about the budget debate in Congress. Mr. Morin talked about the Washington Post poll about public approval of Republican budget cutting plans. In the newspaper roundtable, Governor Graves and Rep. Clayton discussed current policy issues, including Medicare cuts and the role of the federal government. In the point-counterpoint segment, Secretary Brown and Mr. Mosbacher discussed the proper role of the Department of Commerce."
Wednesday, May 17, 1995	3 hr. 1 min.	Lew Ketcham	Richard Benedetto (White House Correspondent, USA Today); Jeffrey Eisenach (President, Progress and Freedom Foundation); Myrlie Evers-Williams (Chair, Board of Directors, NAACP); Robert Greenstein (Founder and Executive Director, Center on Budget and Policy Priorities); Mickey Kantor (Trade Representative, Office of the U.S. Trade Representative); Rep. Nita Lowey (D-NY); Rep. H. James Saxton (R-NJ); Dick Weinhold (Texas State Office Director, Christian Coalition of America)	"Mr. Kantor discussed the Clinton Administration's proposed tariffs on discussed headlines from various papers across the country. In a point-counterpoint discussion, Mr. Eisenach and Mr. Greenstein discussed if Congress can balance the budget and still cut taxes. Via remote link, Mr. Weinhold discussed the unveiling of the Christian Coalition's Contract with the American Family. Ms. Evers-Williams discussed her new post as chairman of the NAACP. Mr. Benedetto discussed today's budget debate in the House."
Thursday, May 18, 1995	3 hr. 1 min.	Bruce Collins; Susan Swain	Sen. Robert F. Bennett (R-UT); Maurice Dawkins (Co-Chairman, Republican Civil Rights Task Force); Ann Reilly Dowd; (Washington, D.C. Bureau Chief, Fortune Magazine); Sen. Russell "Russ" Feingold (D-WI); Kathleen Hall Jamieson (Dean, Annenberg School for Communication, University of Pennsylvania); Jack Sweeney (Latin America Analyst, The Heritage Foundation); Byron York (Correspondent, American Spectator); Raul H. Yzaguirre (President and CEO, National Council of La Raza)	"Ms. Dowd discussed several issues that have economic and financial implications, including the budget debate in Congress. In the newspaper roundtable, Senators Bennett and Feingold discussed headlines from various papers across the country. Via telephone, Mr. York discussed his article entitled "Ron Brown's Booty". Via telephone, Mr. Lind discussed his article entitled "To Have and Have Not - Notes on the American Class War". In a point counterpoint discussion, Mr. Sweeney and Mr. Yzaguirre discussed Immigration Reform. Via remote link, Mr. Dawkins discussed the Republican Civil Rights Task Force meeting in Washington. Ms. Jamieson discussed her book Beyond the Double Bind: Women and Leadership which explores the social and political attitudes about the increasing numbers of women in leadership positions in politics and business."
Friday, May 19, 1995	2 hr. 33 min.	Brian Lamb	Candy Crowley (Senior Correspondent, Politics, CNN); Rep. Rosa DeLauro (D-CT); Dave Goulding (News Photographer, WUSA-TV, Washington, D.C.); Deborah Orin (Washington, D.C. Bureau Chief, New York Post); Michael Tackett (Washington, D.C. Bureau Chief, Chicago Tribune); Diana Walker (White House Photographer, Time Magazine)	"Ms. Crowley discussed events on Capitol Hill. In the newspaper roundtable, Ms. Orin and Mr. Tacket discussed headlines from various papers across the country. Via telephone, Rep. DeLauro discussed her involvement in coordinating the practice this week of using pictures of individuals during the Congressional budget debate. Mr. Goulding and Ms. Walker discussed their work as White House photographers."
Saturday, May 20, 1995	1 hr. 29 min.	Steve Scully	Jack Gullo (Mayor, New Windsor, MD); Rep. Kweisi Mfume(D-MD); Peter Steiner (editorial cartoonist, Washington Times); Louie Valdez (Mayor, Nogales, AZ)	"In the first segment, Rep. Mfume talked about balancing the budget and the African-American legislative summit occurring this weekend. In the next segment, Mr. Steiner talked about how he creates political cartoons. In the newspaper roundtable, Mayors Gullo and Valdez talked about current events, including the closing of Pennsylvania Avenue to traffic in front of the White House."
Sunday, May 21, 1995	1 hr. 58 min.	Steve Scully	William E. Brock III (Former Secretary, U.S. Department of Labor); Former Rep. Thomas J. Downey (D-NY); Howard Fineman (Correspondent, Newsweek); Sen. William "Bill" Frist M.D. (R-TN)	"In the first segment, Mr. Fineman talked about current events, including the controversy surrounding the National Rifle Association in the wake of the Oklahoma City bombing and the closure of Pennsylvania Avenue in front of the White House. In the newspaper roundtable, Mr. Brock, Secretary of Labor during the Reagan administration, and Mr. Downey discussed this closure and other news stories. In the last segment, Senator Frist talked about the Foster nomination and other issues."
Monday, May 22, 1995	2 hr. 57 min.	Brian Lamb	Rep. Ben Cardin (D-MD); Linda Douglass (Politics Correspondent, CBS); Jerry Edwards (Traffic Anchor, Metro Networks); Daniel Goldin (Administrator, NASA); Donald Kellermann (Senior Fellow, Times Mirror Center for People and Press); Rep. Dan Miller (R-FL); Nancy Roman (Supreme Court Correspondent, Washington Times); Jim Wooten (Correspondent, ABC News)	"Ms. Roman previewed this week in Congress. In the newspaper roundtable, Ms. Douglass and Mr. Wooten discussed headlines from papers across the country. Via remote link, Mr. Kellerman discussed his study on the press and the public. In the point-counterpoint discussion, Reps. Cardin and Miller discussed medicare reform. Via telephone, Mr. Edwards discussed the closing of Pennsylvania Avenue in front of the White House. Mr. Goldin discussed his plan for restructuring NASA."
Tuesday, May 23, 1995	2 hr. 57 min.	Susan Swain	Gov. Terry E. Branstad (R-IA); Richard E. Cohen (Congressional Correspondent, National Journal); Al Cross (Correspondent, Louisville Courier-Journal); Jamie Dupree (Correspondent, Cox Communications); Sen. Judd Alan Gregg (R-NH); Sen. Ernest "Fritz" F. Hollings (D-SC); Tony Mauro (Supreme Court Correspondent, Gannett News Service); Sean Strub (executive editor, POZ Magazine); Jim Wallis (editor-in-chief, Sojourners Magazine)	"Mr. Cohen discussed this week's legislative agenda, in particular, the Henry Foster vote, the Senate Welfare Reform Bill markup, and the Senate budget vote. Via remote link, Mr. Mauro discussed the Supreme Court decisions regarding term limits and race-based scholarships at public universities. In the newspaper roundtable, Senators Gregg and Hollings discussed headlines from papers across the country. Via remote link, Mr. Wallis discussed his involvement with a group of religious leaders who are opposing the political agenda of the Christian coalition. Mr. Strub discussed the issues important to his magazine. Via telephone, Mr. Cross discussed today's Gubernatorial primary in Kentucky. Governor Brandstad discussed federal nutrition programs and other issues."
Wednesday, May 24, 1995	3 hr.	Bruce Collins; Lew Ketcham	Laurence Barrett (Washington Bureau Correspondent, Time Magazine); Rep. Samuel "Sam" Brownback (R-KS); Lawrence Di Rita (Deputy Director, Foreign Policy, The Heritage Foundation); Tex Harris (President, American Foreign Service Association); Rep. Marcy Kaptur (D-OH); Page Miller (Director, National Coordinating Committee for the Promotion of History); Diane Skvarla (Associate Curator, U.S. Senate)	"Mr. Barrett discussed several issues up in the Senate, including the vote on Dr. Henry Foster's nomination to be Surgeon General, the vote on the fiscal year 1996 federal budget, and the markup of Senator Packwood's Welfare Reform Bill. In the newspaper roundtable, Reps. Brownback and Kaptur discussed headlines from papers across the country. In the point-counterpoint discussion, Mr. DiRita and Mr. Harris discussed the funding for foreign affairs agencies and the current house bill to consolidate those under the State Department. Ms. Skvarla discussed the tradition of placing vice president's busts in the Capitol. Via remote link, Ms. Miller discussed her views of the nomination of former Kansas Governor John Carlin to the position of Archivist."
Thursday, May 25, 1995	3 hr.	Lew Ketcham; Susan Swain	John Burry (Chairman, Blue Cross/Blue Shield of Ohio); Steve Dryden; Rep. Dick Durbin (D-IL); Peter G. Gosselin (Economics Correspondent, Boston Globe); Rep. Henry J. Hyde (R-IL); Rep. James Lightfoot (R-IA); Greg Scandlen (Executive Director, Council for Affordable Health Insurance); Elizabeth Shogren (Correspondent, Los Angeles Times)	"Mr. Gosselin discussed the Senate budget debate and vote, the Agnew bust, and other congressional issues. In the newspaper roundtable, Reps. Durbin and Lightfoot discussed headlines from papers across the country. In the point-counterpoint discussion, Mr. Scandlen and Mr. Burry discussed medical savings accounts. Via telephone, Ms. Shogren discussed her article about the Republican task force and the Education Department. Rep. Hyde discussed American overseas aid. Mr. Dryden discussed his book Trade Warriors."
Friday, May 26, 1995	2 hr. 2 min.	Brian Lamb	James "Woody" Brosnan (Washington Office Correspondent, Memphis Commercial Appeal); Andrew Ferguson (Senior Writer, Washingtonian Magazine); Cragg Hines (Washington Bureau Chief, Houston Chronicle); Alice Love (Correspondent, Roll Call); Ellen Ratner (Talk Show Host, Talk America Radio Network); Albert Santoli (Editor, Parade Magazine); Mike Schultz (Communications Manager, Baltimore Evening Sun)	"Mr. Hines discussed the week in Congress. Via telephone, Mr. Schultz discussed the closing of the Baltimore Evening Sun. In the newspaper roundtable, Mr. Ferguson and Mr. Ratner discussed headlines from papers across the country. Via telephone, Ms. Love discussed her article about the current state of lobbyist-legislator relations. Via remote link, Mr. Santoli discussed his article on military families. Via remote link, Mr. Brosnan discussed today's scheduled markup and committee vote on the nomination of Dr. Henry Foster to be U.S. Surgeon General. "
Saturday, May 27, 1995	1 hr. 31 min.	Steve Scully	Craig Hanna (Executive Director, House Democratic Steering and Policy Committee); Pat Oliphant (Editorial Cartoonist, Universal Press Syndicate); Paul D. Ryan (Legislative Director, Office of Rep. Sam Brownback (R-KS))	This was the first C-SPAN appearance of future Speaker of the House Paul Ryan. "Mr. Oliphant discussed his political cartoons. In the newspaper roundtable, Mr. Ryan and Mr. Hanna examined the top news stories of the week."
Sunday, May 28, 1995	2 hr. 4 min.	Steve Scully	Daniel Franklin (Washington, D.C. Bureau Chief, The Economist); Sen. Jesse Helms (R-NC); Thomas W. Lippman (Correspondent Washington Post); Kurt Schork (Correspondent, Reuters); Karen Tumulty (Washington, D.C. Correspondent, Time Magazine); Caspar W. Weinberger (Former U.S. Secretary of Defense)	"Ms. Tumulty talked about a variety of issues, including her article in Time Magazine. In the newspaper roundtable, Mr. Lippman and Mr. Weinberger discussed headlines from papers across the country. Via telephone, Mr. Franklin discussed the cover of The Economist and what it means. Senator Helms talked about budget cuts and foreign policy. Via telephone from Sarajevo, Mr. Schork talked about the situation in Bosnia."
Monday, May 29, 1995	2 hr. 59 min.	Connie Doeberle; Lew Ketcham; Brian Lamb	Eric Alterman (Correspondent, Rolling Stone); David S. Broder (Columnist, Washington Post); Nicholas Eberstadt (International Affairs Scholar, American Enterprise Institute); Glenn C. Loury (Economics Professor, Boston University); Sarah McClendon (Correspondent, McClendon News Services); Craig Winneker (associate editor, Roll Call)	"In the first segment Mr. Winneker discussed today's Roll Call and how the magazine crafts its coverage when Congress is in recess. In the newspaper roundtable segment, Mr. Alterman and Professor Loury, author of One By One From the Inside Out, discussed this morning's headline stories. In the next segment, Mr. Eberstadt discussed his book, The Tyranny of Numbers: Mismeasurement and Misrule, on public policy and the use of statistics in problem-solving. By telephone Mr. Broder discussed his article on the possible presidential candidacy of Lowell Weicker. In the final segment, 85-year-old Sarah McClendon, still a working journalist, talked about her lengthy career which has included coverage of eleven presidents. Live views of Arlington National Cemetery on this Memorial Day were shown during open phone segments. "
Tuesday, May 30, 1995	3 hr. 2 min.	Susan Swain	Maureen Gawler; Mark Hosenball (Correspondent, Newsweek); Clint Lyons (Director, National Legal Aid and Defenders Association); Hugh Sidey (Correspondent, Time Magazine);Edwin Yoder (Syndicated Columnist, Washington Post)	"In the first segment, Mr. Hosenball talked about the latest information on the Oklahoma City bombing investigation. In the newspaper roundtable, Mr. Sidey and Mr. Yoder talked about current news topics. In the point-counterpoint, Mr. Lyons and Ms. Gawler debated whether the federal government should continue to fund the Legal Services Corporation, which provides low-cost legal services to low-income citizens."
Wednesday, May 31, 1995	2 hr. 37 min.	Bruce Collins; Lew Ketcham	Ralph J. Begleiter (Correspondent, CNN);William Bywater (President, International Union of Electronic Workers); Andrew Marr (Columnist, London Independent); Dan Morgan (Correspondent, Washington Post); John O'Sullivan (Editor, National Review); Roger Robinson (Former Senior Director, U.S. National Security Council); Greg Vuksich (Representative, Center for Strategic and International Studies)	"Mr. Begleiter discussed the current developments in Bosnia-Herzegovina and U.S. policy in that region. Via telephone, Mr. Marr previewed Prime Minister John Major's address on Bosnia. In the newspaper roundtable, Mr. Bywater and Mr. O'Sullivan discussed headlines from papers across the country. In the point-counterpoint discussion, Mr. Robinson and Mr. Vuksich discussed U.S. policy toward Bosnia. Mr. Morgan discussed the congressional appropriations process."
