= Krikščiūnas =

Krikščiūnas is a Lithuanian surname. Notable people with the surname include:

- Jonas Krikščiūnas (1880–1967), Lithuanian poet
- Romualdas Krikščiūnas (1930–2010), Lithuanian bishop
