= Takaharu (given name) =

- Gender: Male

Origin
- Origin: Japanese
- Meaning: Different meanings depending on the kanji used

Takaharu (written: 高晴, 高陽, 高治, 貴晴, 貴治, 隆治, 崇晴, 敬春, 天晴 or 孝晴) is a masculine Japanese given name. Notable people with the name include:

- Banryūyama Takaharu (播竜山 孝晴; born 1951), Japanese sumo wrestler
- Takaharu Furukawa (古川 高晴; born 1984), Japanese archer
- Takaharu Kondo (近藤 崇晴; 1944–2010), Japanese judge
- Takaharu Koyama (小山 隆治; born 1948), Japanese middle-distance runner
- Takaharu Kyōgoku (京極 高晴; born 1938), Japanese businessman and Shinto priest
- Takaharu Mitsui (三井 高陽; 1900–1983), Japanese philatelist
- Takaharu Murahama (村濱 天晴; born 1972), Japanese mixed martial artist
- Takaharu Nakajima (中嶋 敬春; born 1983), Japanese speed skater
- Naitō Takaharu (内藤 高治; 1862–1929), Japanese kendoka
- Takaharu Nishino (西野 貴治; born 1993), Japanese footballer
- Takaharu Tezuka (手塚 貴晴; born 1964), Japanese architect
