= Panevėžys Cathedral =

Roman Catholic cathedral in Panevėžys, Lithuania

Cathedral of Christ the King Kristaus Karaliaus katedra
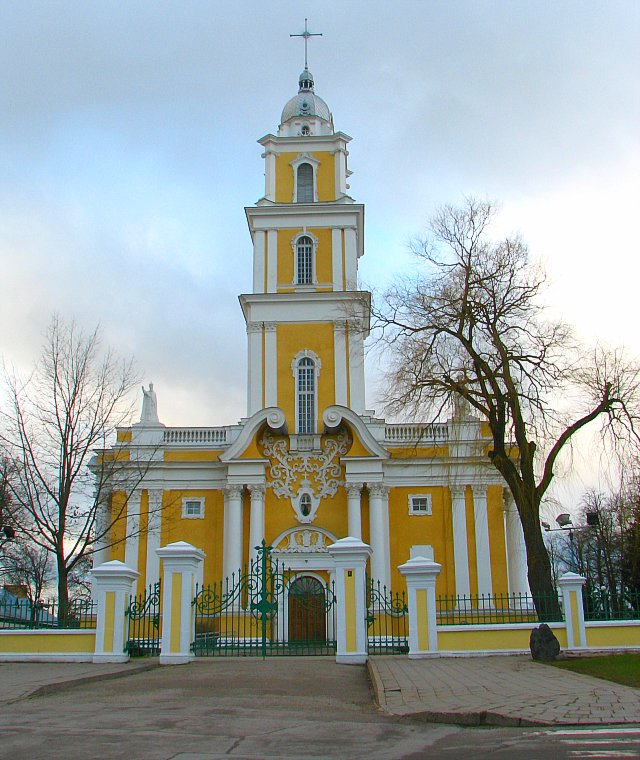

Religion
- Affiliation: Roman Catholic
- Ecclesiastical or organisational status: Cathedral
- Year consecrated: 1933
- Status: Active

Location
- Location: Panevėžys, Lithuania
- Interactive map of Cathedral of Christ the King; Kristaus Karaliaus katedra
- Coordinates: 55°43′22″N 24°21′32″E

Architecture
- Architect: Rytis Steikūnas
- Style: Eclecticism
- Groundbreaking: 1908

Specifications
- Direction of façade: East
- Length: 55 metres (180 ft)
- Width: 27 metres (89 ft)
- Height (max): 16 metres (52 ft)
- Spire: One
- Spire height: 55 metres (180 ft)
- Materials: Brick, reinforced concrete

The Cathedral of Christ the King (Lithuanian: Kristaus Karaliaus katedra) in Panevėžys, Lithuania, is a Roman Catholic cathedral, seat of the Roman Catholic Diocese of Panevėžys.

== History ==
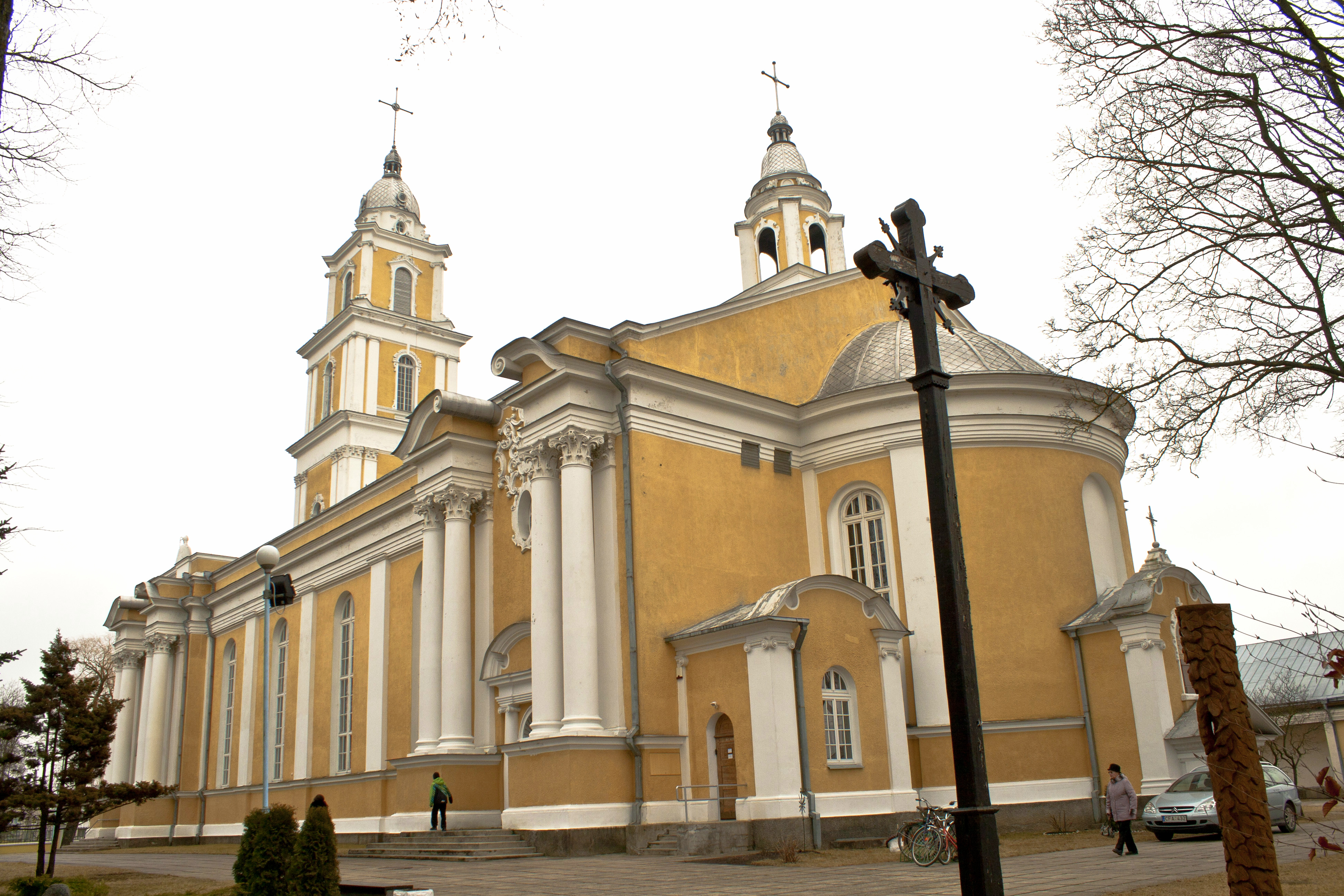
Backside view of the cathedral

In 1860, bishop Motiejus Valančius began preparations for construction of a new church in Panevėžys. However, after the Uprising of 1863, the Tsarist authorities implemented Russification policies, including the Lithuanian press ban and suppression of the Catholic Church. The authorities forbade construction of any new Catholic churches and closed the Piarist church leaving only the Church of Saints Peter and Paul to service the Catholic inhabitants of Panevėžys. A permission for construction was obtained in 1904, but the work was delayed by the Russo-Japanese War and the Revolution of 1905 until 1908. Until World War I, a rectory and a temporary chapel were completed while church's walls rose up to the windows. The church was to be named after Saint Stanislaus the Martyr.

After the war the construction was abandoned until April 4, 1926, when Pope Pius XI, in his apostolic constitution "To the Lithuanian People, After the Great War, with God's help, having regained freedom," established the Roman Catholic Diocese of Panevėžys by creating the ecclesiastical province of Kaunas and designated the Church of St. Stanislaus, Bishop and Martyr, which was under construction, as the future bishop's cathedral, giving it the name of Christ the King (this title was most likely chosen to highlight the historical significance of the papal constitution). Architect Rytis Steikūnas and engineer Aleksandras Gordevičius redesigned and expanded the church as it now was to serve as a cathedral. The unfinished cathedral was blessed by Jonas Mačiulis (better known as Maironis) on Saint Casimir's Day (March 4) in 1930. For that occasion Maironis wrote a hymn dedicated to Christ the King. Four bells from Apolda, Germany, were blessed in 1931. The largest, weighing 1,628 kilograms (3,589 lb), is dedicated to Christ the King. The organ, produced by Bruno Goebel in Königsberg, has three manuals. The cathedral was consecrated during a Eucharistic Congress on June 30, 1933, by Juozapas Skvireckas, Archbishop of Kaunas. The interior was decorated by local painter Povilas Puzinas in 1938–1939.

== Architecture ==
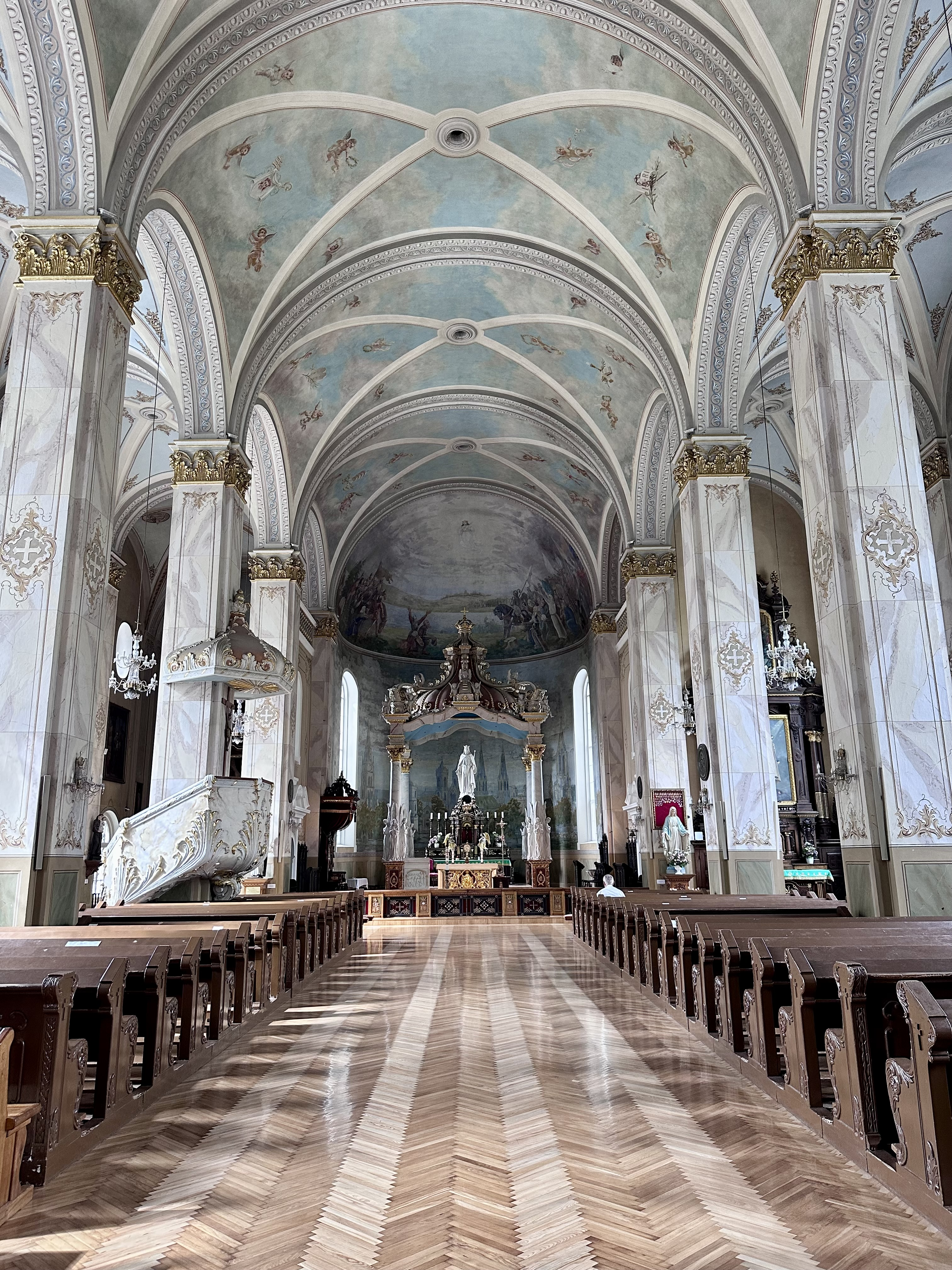
Interior looking towards the central altar

The cathedral is eclectic combining features of Baroque and Neoclassicism. The façade is dominated by the rectangular tower topped with an octagonal dome. Two 3-metre (9.8 ft) high sculptures of Pope Pius XI and Jurgis Matulevičius, founders of the diocese, stand on the corners of the roof. The pediment of the portico is decorated with cartouches: the top one features a royal crown while the lower has the coat of arms of the bishop. The cathedral has three naves with groin vaults built of reinforced concrete. Chapel of Saint Casimir occupies a large hall under the presbytery, which is also known as the catacombs. The monstrance was gifted by Pope Pius XI. The church tabernacle is made of gilded oak. Two small angels, made by Joseph Rifesser from Urtijëi, are kneeling on each side. Above it there is a white sculpture of Christ the King by Juozas Zikaras. The richly decorated baldachin of the altar rests on four white columns, surrounded by sculptures of angels.

The ceiling of the apse is decorated by a 22-by-14-metre (72 ft × 46 ft) fresco by Jonas Mackevičius depicting Saint Casimir appearing to Lithuanian soldiers during the 1518 Siege of Polotsk. The fresco was restored in 2002. The walls of the apse depict ten churches of ten deaneries of the diocese. The side aisles end with oak altars produced by Joseph Rifesser. The left altar features a copy of the Sistine Madonna and a painting of Saint Casimir surrounded by sculptures of Albert of Riga and Saint Monica. The right altar features a sculpture of Saint Francis of Assisi helping crucified Jesus, modeled after a painting by Bartolomé Esteban Murillo, and a painting of Saint Stanislaus. Puzinas painted the ceiling vaults with frescoes of angels in the clouds while ceiling of the chapels was decorated with images of the Four Evangelists. He also created eight large paintings that hang in the naves.
