= Federico Brito Figueroa =

Venezuelan Marxist historian and anthropologist (1921-2000)

Federico Brito Figueroa (La Victoria, 2 November 1921 – Caracas, 28 April 2000) was a Venezuelan Marxist historian and anthropologist. Brito's ideas and writings played an important role in the ideological formation of Hugo Chavez, former president of Venezuela.

Born in La Victoria in Venezuela, Brito was a member of Venezuela's National Democratic Party (Partido Democrático Nacional – PDN, which later renamed Acción Democrática) in 1936. Brito, after profound schisms appeared in the Venezuelan left, joined the Communist Party of Venezuela, together with Domingo Maza Zavala and Luis Miquilena.

In 1946, Brito entered the Instituto Pedagógico Nacional (National Teaching Institute) to obtain the title of professor of social sciences. Brito later travelled to Mexico. There, he studied in the Escuela Nacional de Antropología e Historia (National School of Anthropology and History). Along with Wenceslao Roces and François Chavalier, Brito graduated with a degree in ethnology and anthropology. Brito returned to Venezuela in 1959, after Marcos Pérez Jiménez's toppling, and began studies at the Universidad Central de Venezuela and was licensed as a historian and obtained his doctorate in anthropology. Brito's doctoral thesis was the renowned and influential work La estructura económica de Venezuela colonial (The Economic Structure of Colonial Venezuela), which he wrote in 1963 and published in 1978.

Key points of his works included the elucidation of slavery, the study of Federal War general Ezequiel Zamora, and a critical and probing analysis of the socioeconomic underpinnings of both colonialism and neocolonialism.

== Works ==
- Ezequiel Zamora. Un capitulo de la historia nacional, Caracas, 1951
- Liberacion de los esclavos, Caracas, 1951
- Venezuela, siglo XX, 1967
- La estructura económica de Venezuela colonial, Caracas, 1978
- Tiempo de Ezequiel Zamora, Caracas, 1981
- El problema tierra y esclavos en la historia de Venezuela, Caracas, 1982
- Historia económica y social de Venezuela: Una estructura para su estudio, Caracas, 1979/1987
