= Church of St. Peter and St. Paul, Panevėžys =

Church in Panevėžys, Lithuania

St. Peter and St. Paul's Church Šv. apaštalų Petro ir Povilo bažnyčia
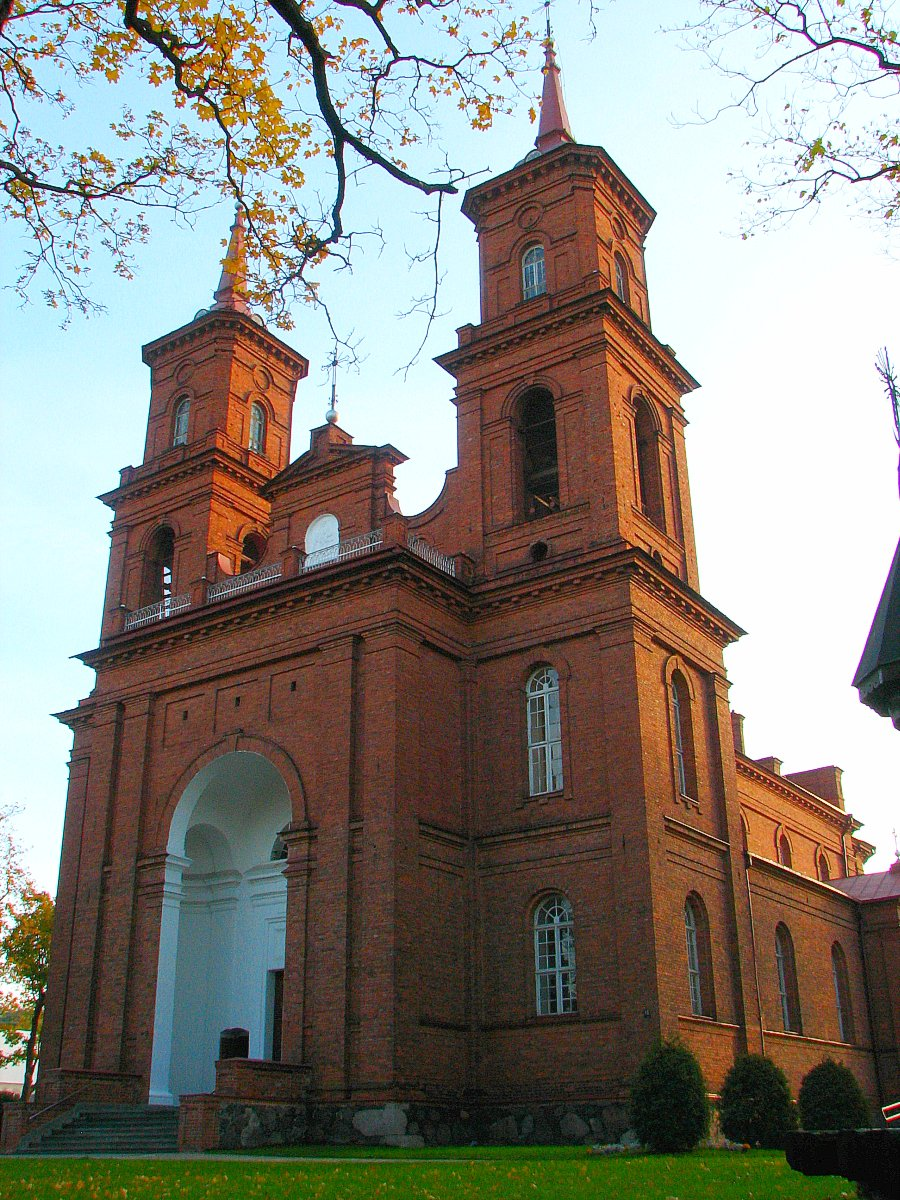
- Front façade of St. Peter and St. Paul's

Religion
- Affiliation: Roman Catholic
- Leadership: Roman Catholic Diocese of Panevėžys

Location
- Location: Panevėžys, Lithuania
- Interactive map of St. Peter and St. Paul's Church; Šv. apaštalų Petro ir Povilo bažnyčia
- Coordinates: 55°43′56.18″N 24°22′9.76″E

Architecture
- Type: Church
- Style: Neo-Romanesque
- Groundbreaking: 1877
- Completed: 1885
- Materials: Brick masonry

Website
- Petropoviloparapija.lt

The St. Peter and St. Paul's Church (Lithuanian: Šv. apaštalų Petro ir Povilo bažnyčia) is a Roman Catholic church in Panevėžys, Lithuania. The current Neo-Renaissance brick church was built between 1877 – 1885, however the parish dates to 1507 when the first church in Panevėžys was built on the right bank of Nevėžis and a filial church of the Panevėžys Old Town was established, belonging to the Parish of Ramygala. It has an authentic organ constructed by Juozapas Radavičius which dates to 1887. The church was renewed in 2018 and a new altar, made of Greek marble and gilded wood carvings, was added and consecrated.

== Gallery ==
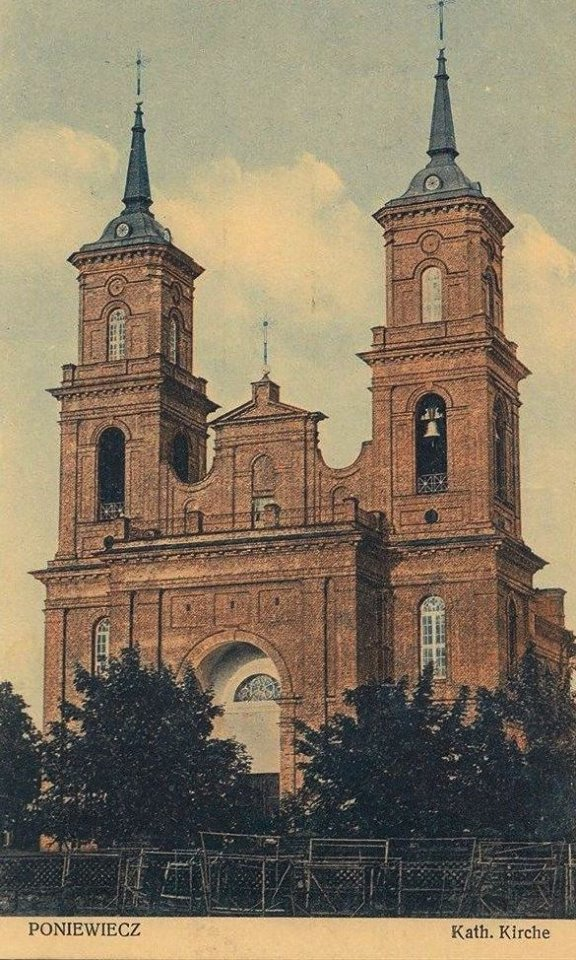
Front façade in 1915

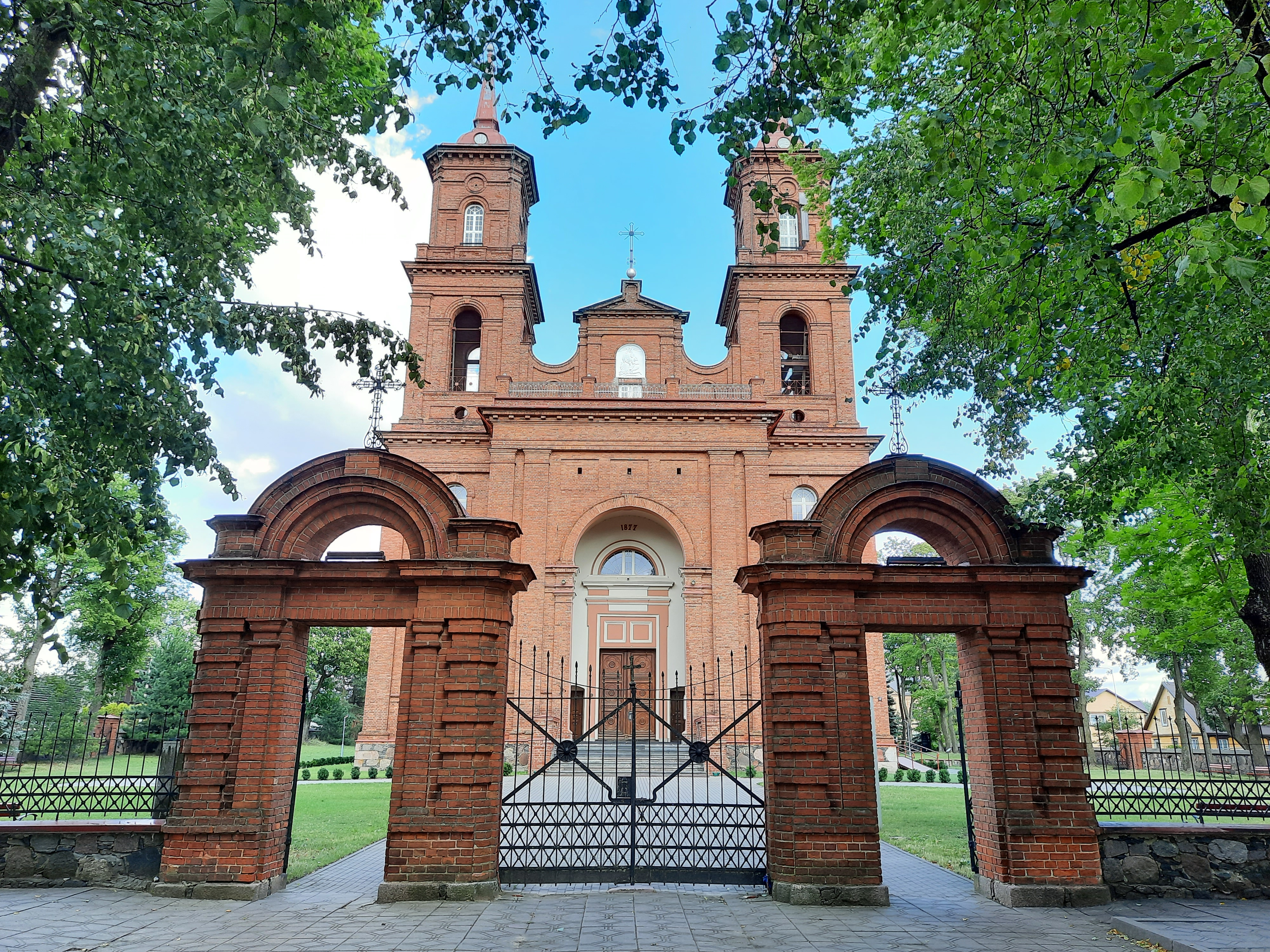
Gates and front façade of the church in 2024

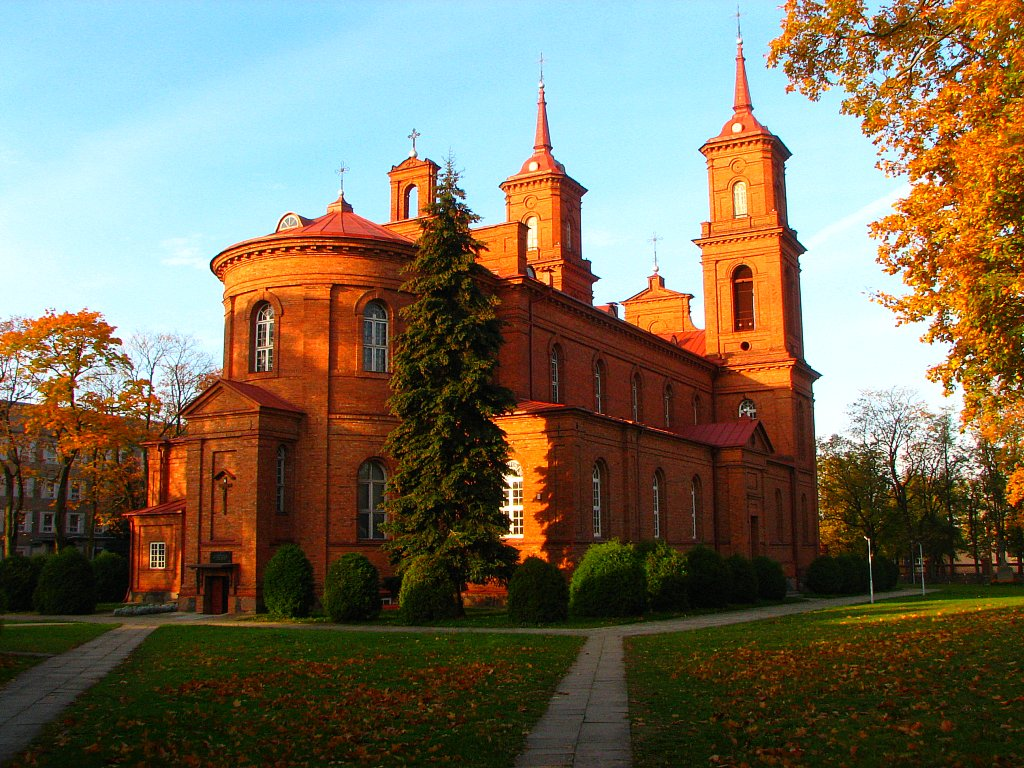
Backside view

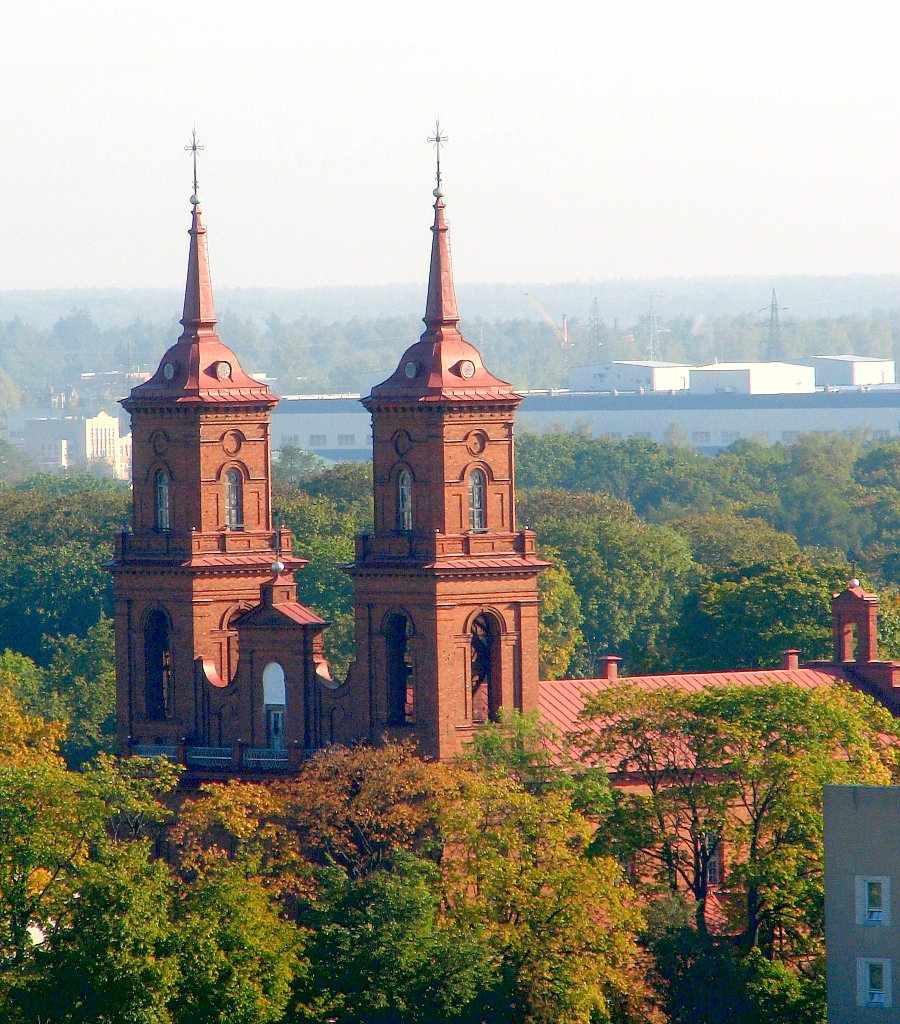
Church's towers

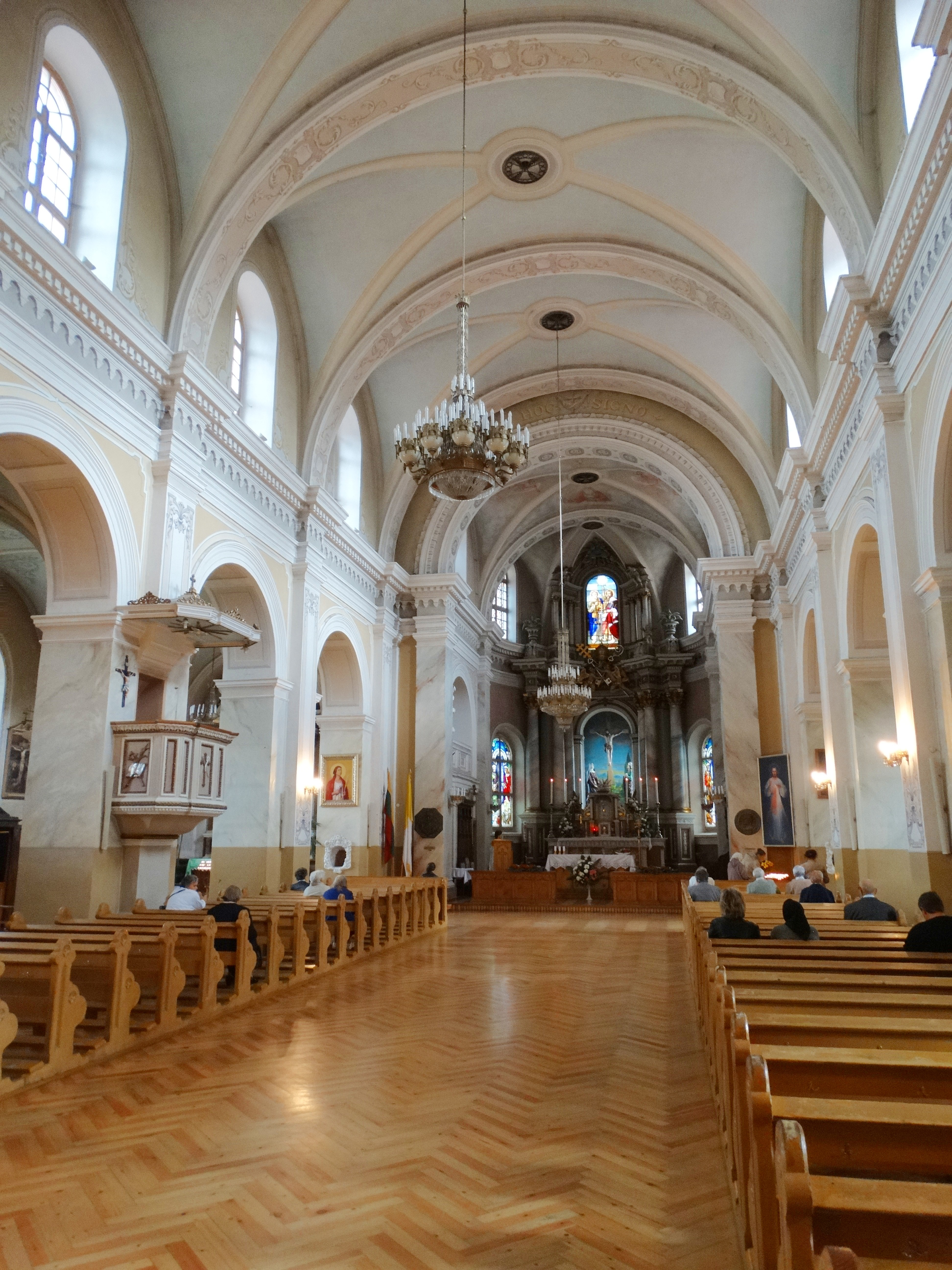
Interior

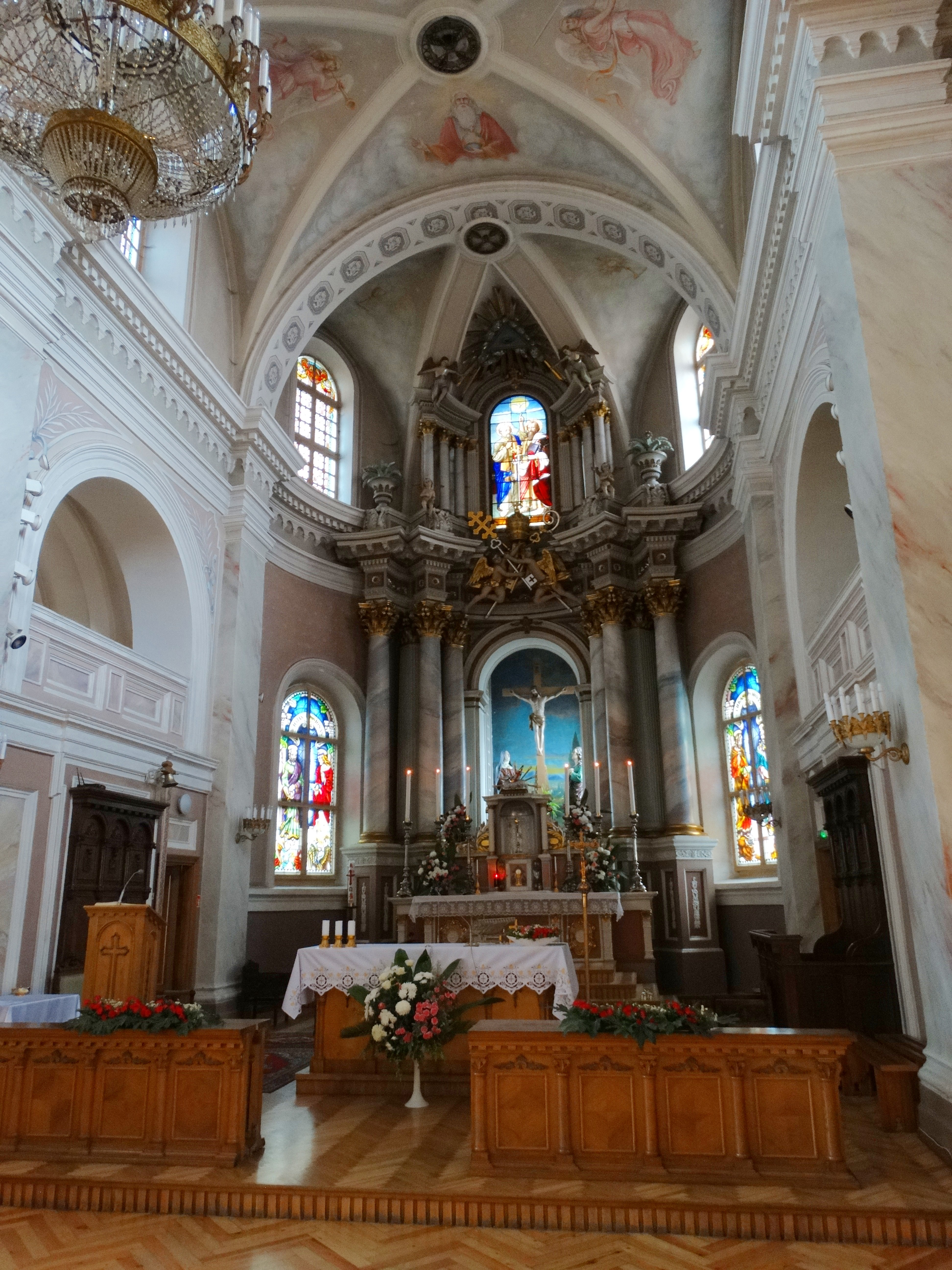
Main altar

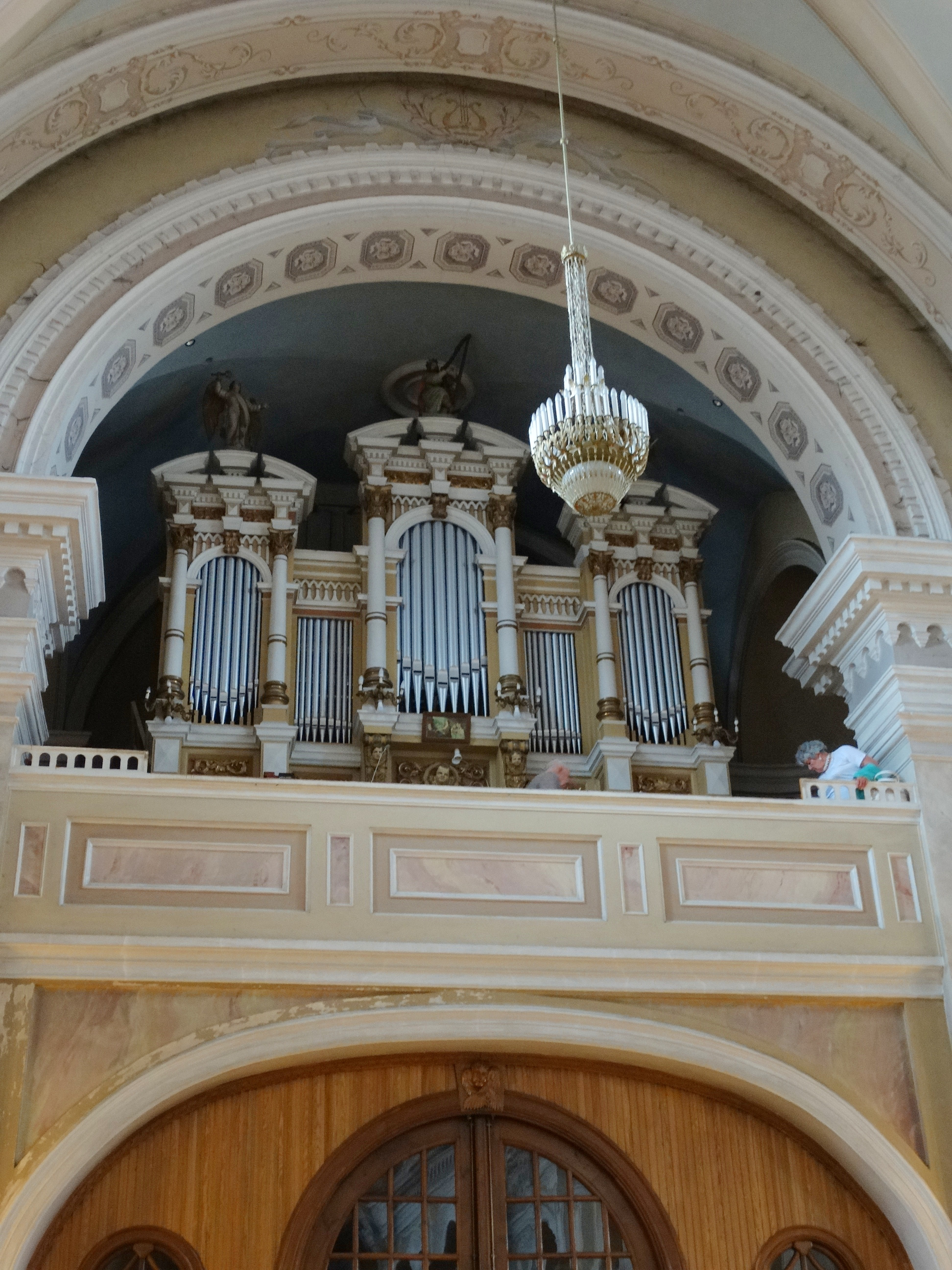
Organ
