= Midge the Sea Lion =

Famous Oklahoma City Zoo resident

Midge

Midge the Sea Lion (1985 – November 5, 2010) was a famous sea lion in residence at the Oklahoma City zoo.

Midge was born in 1985. She was rescued from the California coast with severe nutritional and respiratory problems. She was given to the zoo by the Santa Barbara Marine Mammal Center in 1986. She was one of the original animals living at the zoo for the debut of the Noble Aquatic Center: Aquaticus in 1986. She was popular among zoo guests for her outgoing nature. One of the stars of the zoo sea lion show for many years, her artwork was popular at shows among zoo artwork buyers. The art she created was featured in Oklahoma City galleries and used to raise money for animal aid organizations. Midge's artwork was "signed" after completion, by putting a purple nose print on the back of the canvas that resembled a small heart.

Midge worked with another sea lion named Moe, among many other sea lions, in a James Bond-themed series for several years. The sea lions were also well known to give 'kisses' to some lucky visitors, while monitored by trainers.

Thousands of white nodules on her lungs were believed to be lung cancer. Due to declining health which caused her weight to drop from 175 to 125 pounds and require hospice care by zoo staff, a group of animal trainers, curators and veterinary staff members decided to euthanize the sea lion. Midge was euthanized on November 5, 2010, and was cremated. Tissue samples were taken before cremation so a zoo pathologist could determine exactly what illness the sea lion had.

"Midge has been a wonderful ambassador for the zoo by educating and entertaining hundreds of thousands of people about sea lions, conservation and the environment," Executive Director Dwight Scott stated. "She will be missed by many."
