= Siege of Polotsk =

1518 battle in the Muscovite–Lithuanian Wars

Coordinates: 55°29′N 28°46′E

- Part of the Muscovite–Lithuanian Wars
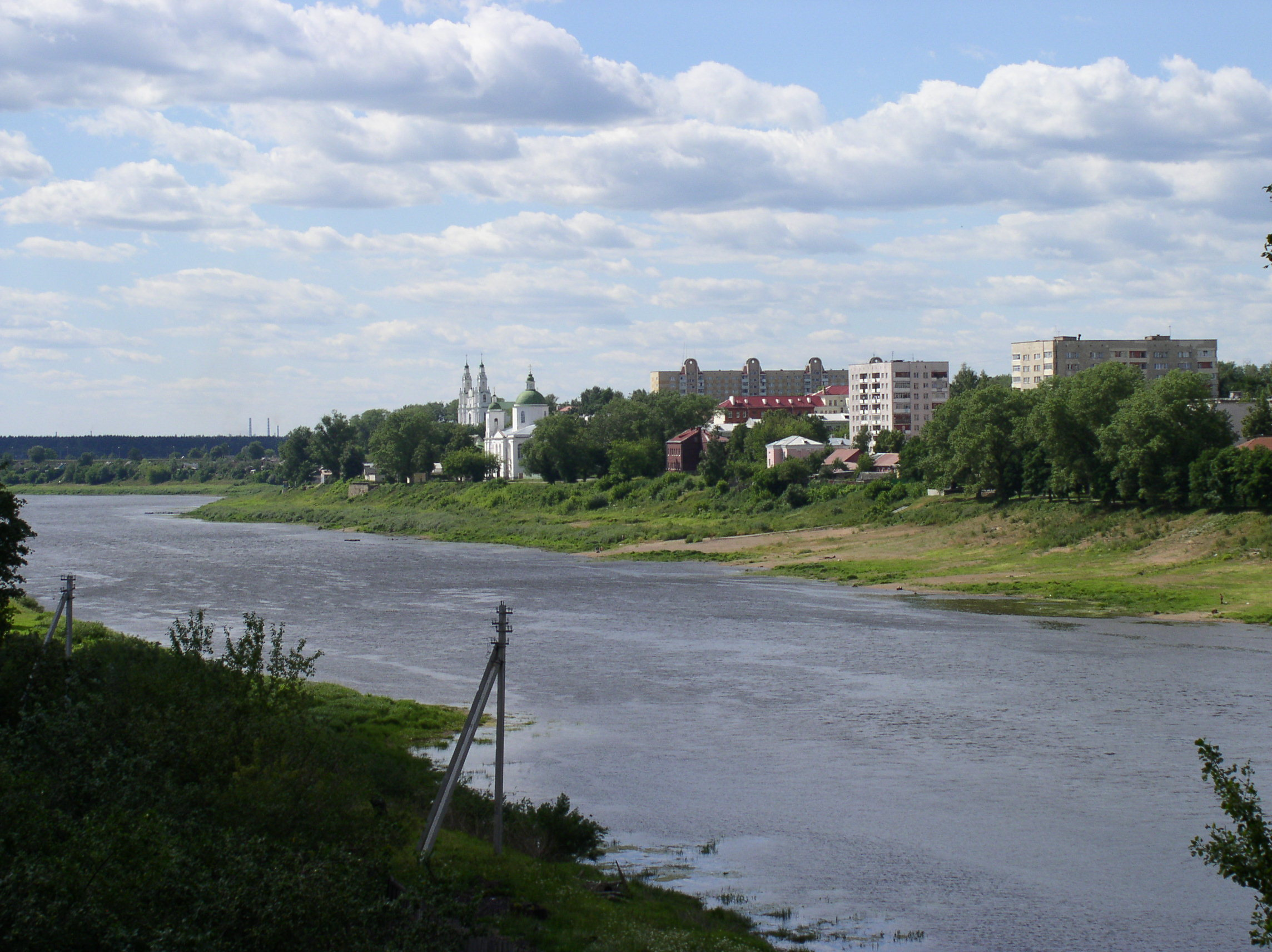
- Daugava (Dvina) River near Polotsk
Date	1518
Location	Polotsk
Result	Lithuanian victory

Belligerents
Grand Duchy of Moscow	Grand Duchy of Lithuania

Commanders and leaders
Vasily Nemoy Shuysky; Ivan Vasilievich Shuysky	Albertas Goštautas; Jan Boratyński

Strength
7,000	2,000

The siege of Polotsk was laid in 1518 by forces of the Grand Duchy of Moscow on Polotsk during the Fourth Muscovite–Lithuanian War (1512–1522). The Lithuanians defended the city. According to a legend, Saint Prince Casimir Jagiellon appeared before the Lithuanian troops and helped them to achieve victory. It was the first miracle attributed to Casimir, which perpetuated his cult and led to his eventual canonization.

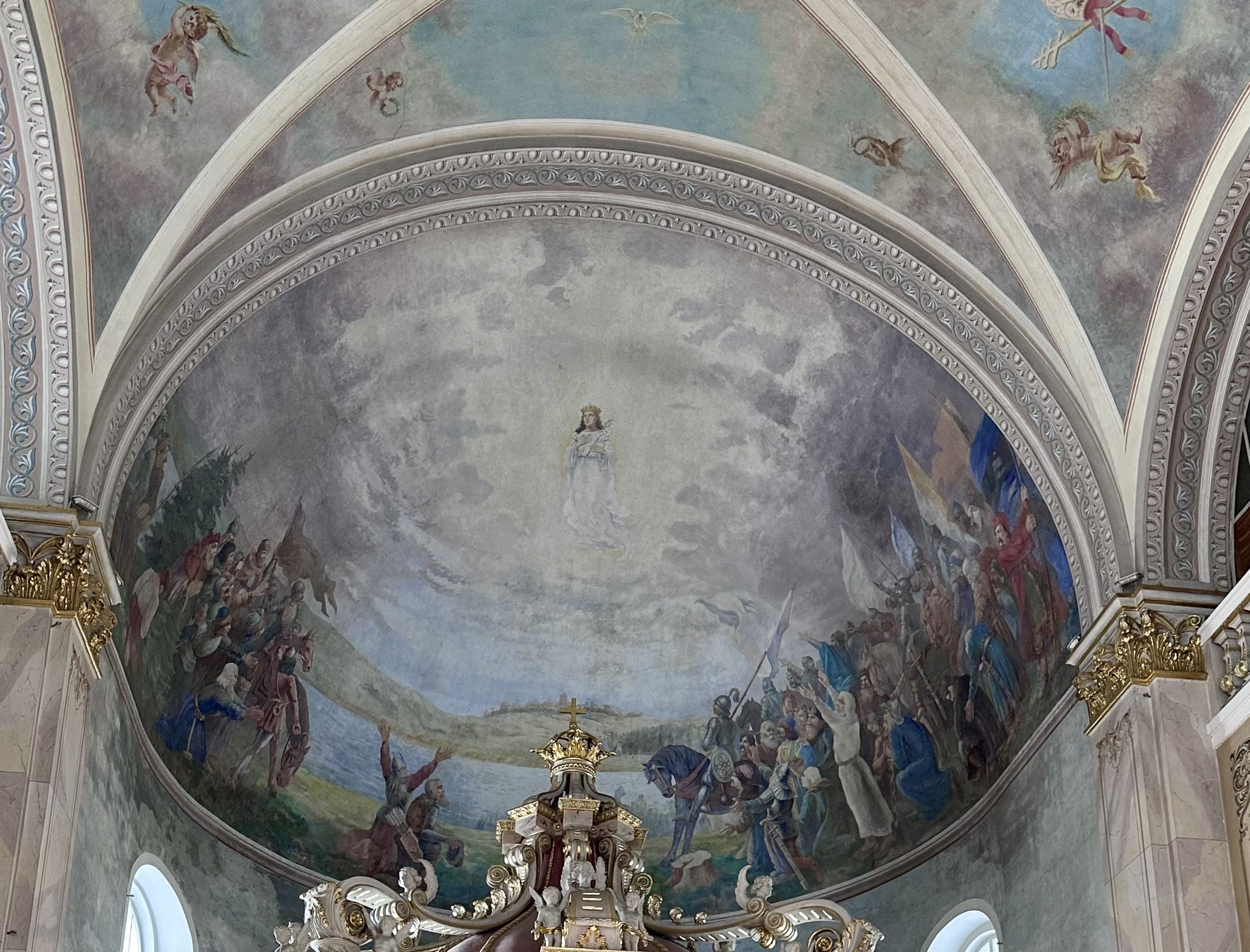
Fresco The Appearance of St. Casimir to the Lithuanian Army near Polotsk in the Panevėžys Cathedral, dedicated to the siege

The growing and strengthening Grand Duchy of Moscow engaged in a series of wars with the Grand Duchy of Lithuania over control of the former territories of Kievan Rus'. A new war erupted in 1512. In 1518, Russian forces from Novgorod, commanded by Vasily Nemoy Shuysky, and Pskov, commanded by Ivan Vasilievich Shuysky, attacked Polotsk. The Russian army also included detachments of heavy artillery. They set siege towers and fired volleys against the city walls. However, soon the attackers faced food shortages. The Russians would cross the Daugava River in search of food. The Lithuanians sent reinforcements to the city, commanded by Albertas Goštautas, Voivode of Polotsk. The Lithuanian army also included a detachment of Polish mercenaries under Jan Boratyński. The Lithuanians attacked a Russian party searching for food. Many Russians drowned in the river during their hasty retreat.

According to a legend, recorded by Bernard Wapowski and Marcin Bielski, the Lithuanians could not locate a safe place to cross the river. However, a young man appeared, dressed in white and riding a fine horse, and rode first into the river leading the Lithuanians safely across only to disappear on the other side. The soldiers identified the youth as their deceased Prince Casimir, elder brother of Lithuanian Grand Duke Sigismund I the Old. After crossing, the Lithuanians waited for the night, set hay stacks alight to confuse and disorient the enemy, and swiftly attacked the Russians. The Russians suffered great losses and had to retreat.
