= Linas Vodopjanovas =

Lithuanian priest (born 1973)

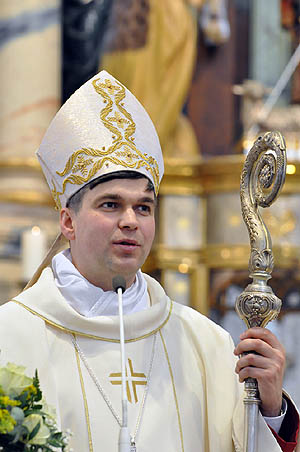
Linas Vodopjanovas

Linas Vodopjanovas (born 1973 in Neringa Municipality) is a Lithuanian clergyman and bishop for the Roman Catholic Diocese of Panevėžys. He was ordained in 2000. He was appointed bishop in 2016.
