= Tom Allison (baseball) =

American scouter

Thomas Ray Allison (September 13, 1967) is the top scouting executive for the Seattle Mariners baseball team. Prior to his role as an executive, he played minor league baseball from 1990 to 1994.

He was born in Klamath Falls, Oregon. Prior to playing professionally, he attended Susitna Valley High School near Talkeetna, Alaska, then Cal State Fullerton and then Chapman College. The New York Mets drafted him in the 48th round of the 1990 Major League Baseball draft, a few picks ahead of infielder Marty Malloy. The infielder reached Triple-A in 1992 and 1993, but never played in the major leagues. He slashed .241/.344/.320 in 303 games over five seasons.

From 1995 to 1996, he was an assistant scouting director for the Mets and was an area scouting director from 1996 to 1999. he was a scouting cross checker for the Milwaukee Brewers from 2000 to 2006. He was then the scouting director for the Arizona Diamondbacks before being replaced by Ray Montgomery for 2011. He drafted players like Paul Goldschmidt, Josh Collmenter, Jarrod Parker, Bryan Shaw, Collin Cowgill, Ryan Wheeler, A.J. Pollock, Matt Davidson and Chris Owings during his tenure with the club. He joined the Boston Red Sox system for 2011 and 2012, working as the Regional Crosschecker for the Midwest. In 2013, he became the Mariners scouting director. In 2015, he was promoted to head of all baseball scouting operations. He stayed with Seattle through 2020, then joined the Los Angeles Dodgers as a special assignment scout in 2021.
