= Muzzle print =

Distinct pattern on animals

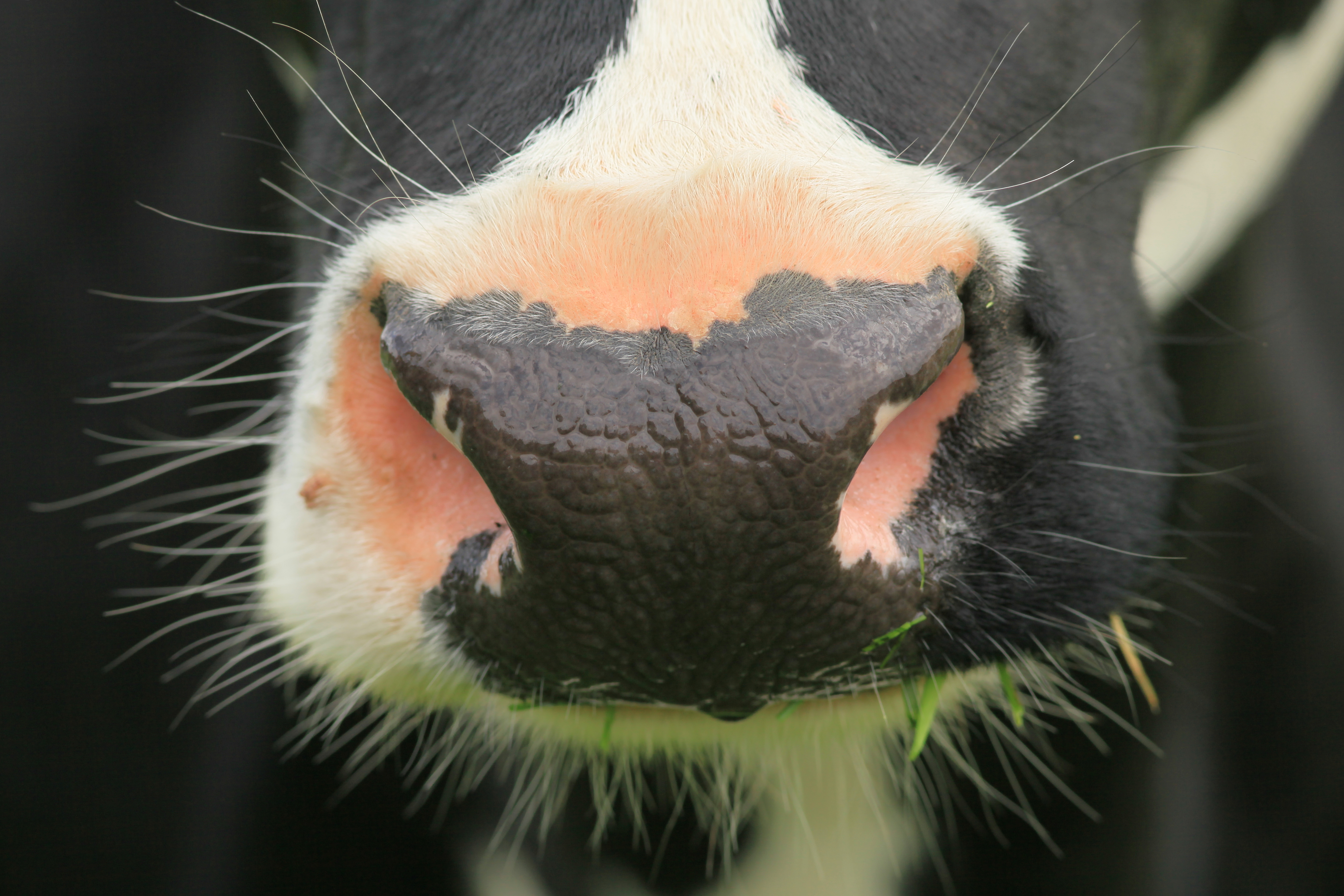
Cattle - muzzle print

A muzzle print or nose print can be used as a distinguishing pattern for animal identification. The muzzle print is a primary animal biometric characteristic for the recognition of individual cattle. It is a unique animal identifier that is similar to human fingerprints.

== Methods ==
Paper-based or inked muzzle print collection techniques are available.

Mobile applications can also be used to collect muzzle images of cattle, for image storage as a unique digital identity.
