= Jutta Burggraf =

German Catholic theologian

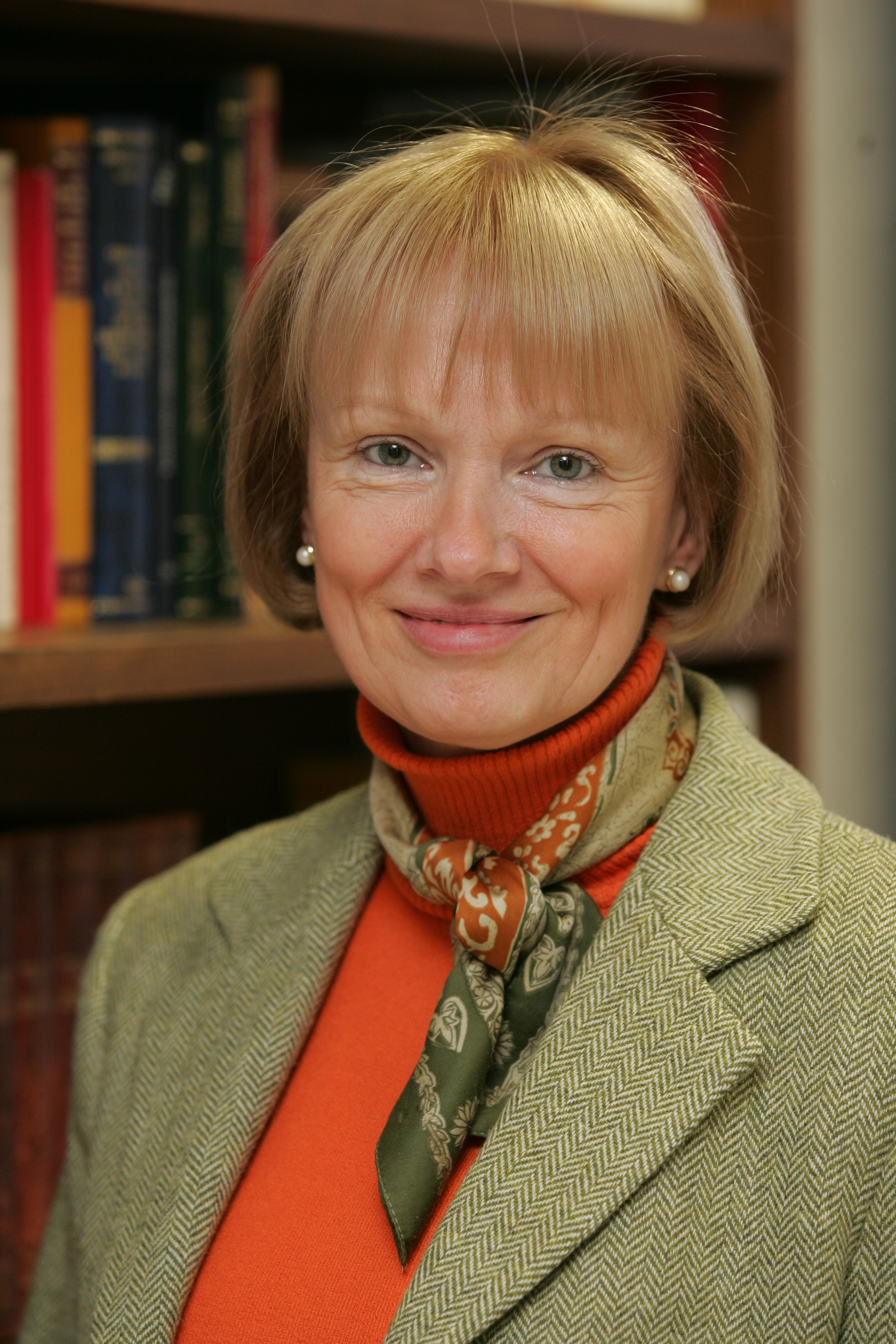
Jutta Burggraf

Jutta Burggraf (1952 Hildesheim, Germany– 5 November 2010 Pamplona, Spain) was a German Catholic theologian. Burggraf taught at the University of Navarra, where she wrote books and did research. She was a numerary member of Opus Dei.
