= Byron Duckenfield =

Byron Leonard Duckenfield
- Born: Byron Leonard Duckenfield; 15 April 1917; Sheffield
- Died: 19 November 2010 (aged 93); Bretby
- Military career
- Allegiance: United Kingdom
- Branch: Royal Air Force
- Service years: 1935–1969
- Rank: Group Captain
- Nickname: Ron
- Units: No. 10 Flying Training School, 32 Squadron, 74 Squadron, 501 Squadron, RAF Northolt
- Commands: 66 Squadron, 19 Squadron
- Conflicts: World War II: Battle of France, Battle of Britain
- Awards: Air Force Cross, Queen's Commendation for Valuable Service in the Air
- Other work: Rolls-Royce

Group Captain Byron Leonard "Ron" Duckenfield AFC (15 April 1917 – 19 November 2010) was a World War II Royal Air Force fighter pilot who flew during the Battle of Britain.

== Early life ==
Duckenfield was born in Sheffield, and was educated at Sheffield City High School before working as a milkman and then joining the Royal Air Force in 1935.

== Royal Air Force ==
Duckenfield began his RAF career at No. 10 Flying Training School at RAF Ternhill near Market Drayton in 1935. Having qualified as a pilot and been promoted to the rank of Sergeant, he was posted to 32 Squadron at RAF Biggin Hill on 8 August 1936 to fly Hurricanes. He was part of the testing which resulted in the formation of the Chain Home Low coastal radar stations. He joined 74 Squadron who were flying Spitfires in April 1940.
He was soon posted to 501 Squadron in France, and after just six days there, he cheated death when on board a Bristol Bombay transport aircraft which crashed in France, killing three squadron members and the crew, and injuring six others. He was sent to hospital back in the UK.
Back with 501 on 23 July, on 15 August Duckenfield clashed with Dornier Do 215s, shooting one down and claiming another as a 'probable'. On 28 August he claimed a Messerschmitt 109, and another on 8 September. On 15 September he was posted to RAF Northolt to serve as a test pilot at the Air Fighting Development Unit.

Awarded an Air Force Cross in late 1941, Duckenfield was also Mentioned in Despatches.

Serving with 615 Squadron in Burma in late December 1942, Duckenfield was shot down over Magwe and captured. He spent two-and-a-half years in a Rangoon jail and remained a POW until May 1945.

In November 1949, Duckenfield undertook a refresher course at the Flying Training School, after which he took command of 19 Squadron flying Hornets and Meteors from RAF Church Fenton.

Duckenfield was awarded the Queen's Commendation for Valuable Service in the Air.

After a number of staff positions, he retired from the RAF as a Group Captain on 28 May 1969.

His final score was three kills and one shared aircraft destroyed, and one damaged.

== Post RAF career ==
After retiring from the RAF, Duckenfield worked in marketing for Rolls-Royce in Japan from 1969 until 1982 before retiring to Bretby Park, where he enjoyed walking, reading and crosswords.

Byron Duckenfield died, aged 93, on 19 November 2010 in Bretby, Derbyshire.

== See also ==
- Battle of Britain
- Royal Air Force
- RAF Fighter Command
- Air Force Cross (United Kingdom)
- Mentioned in Despatches
- Prisoner of war
- Military aviation
