= Thomas Allison (explorer) =

Thomas Allison (fl. 1697), was an English Arctic voyager.

== Outward Voyage ==
Of Allison's personal history we have no record beyond what is to be gleaned from a journal of one of his voyages afterwards published. While in command of the ship Ann, of Yarmouth, of 260 tons, in the service of the Russia Company, he left Archangel in the White Sea on his homeward voyage, on 8 October 1697. After beating about for seventeen days off the coasts of Russia and Lapland, he found himself, on the 23rd of the same month, twenty-one miles N.E. from the Nord Kyn, the northernmost point of Europe and Norway, in lat. 71° 6′ N. Two days later, during a gale in thick weather, he sighted the North Cape, and ran for shelter into the 'Fuel,' or wide opening between the Nord Kyn and the North Cape.

== Arctic ==
A perusal of his journal in the light of the best modern charts and sailing directions for these parts serves to show that he finally anchored in a small but secure harbour on the west side of what is now known as Porsanger Fjord, probably Saernoes Pollen, where he, by stress of weather, was forced to winter. It was during this period, under most difficult and trying circumstances, that his once famous journal was written, which is a faithful record of the daily experiences and trials of himself and his hardy crew. Such was the intense cold on 1 February 1698, that, in order to write his journal, 'a boy had to thaw the ink as oft as he had occasion to dip his pen.' The writer appears to have been not only a thorough seaman, well experienced in northern navigation, but also one well able to command the respect of his men by his unswerving adherence to daily work and discipline during a period of nearly five months' apparently enforced idleness.

== Return ==
After enduring all the hardships of a severe Arctic winter with the loss of only one man, the Ann left the Fuel on 26 March 1698, and on 24 April following finally reached Gravesend. This narrative was published in the following year under the title of An Account of a Voyage from Archangel in Russia, in the year 1697, of the Ship and Company wintering near the North Cape, in the Latitude of 71. Their manner of Living and what they suffered by the Extreame Cold. Also Observations of the Climate, Country, and Inhabitants. Together with a Chart. By Tho. Allison, Commander of the Ship. Published at the request of the Russia Company, chiefly for the benefit of those who sail that way, as well for the satisfaction of the curious, or any who are concerned in that trade. London, 1699, 8vo (112 pp.). This account, often overlooked, was afterwards reprinted in Pinkerton's Voyages.
