= Maria Dolors Maestre i Pal =

Andorran philanthropist

Maria Dolors Mestre i Pal (1929 – 15 November 2010), was an Andorran philanthropist, born in La Seu d'Urgell (Catalonia, Spain), known in Andorra and Alt Urgell for the charities she made throughout her life.

== Biography ==
Maria Maestre was born in 1929, was the daughter of Dr. Xavier Maestre and Maria Pal, who in turn was the daughter of the owners of the Baths of San Vicente, and granddaughter of former Parliament Speaker Bonaventura Master Moles. She was the matriarch of wealthy the Andorran family Casa Molines, owners of which is currently called Molines Patrimonis, a heritage asset management company in Andorra. She never married, but did adopt three children.

In 2006, she received the City Medal of the City Council of La Seu d'Urgell for the creation of the "Francesc Xavier" kindergarten and the center for psychic disabled Taller Claror.

== Inheritance ==
In her testament she designated the Bishopric of Urgell as sole heirs of her patrimony, valued at 500 million Euros in 2019. Her children disagreed with this, saying the church took advantage of her, and the process of distribution of the inheritance took approximately 10 years after her death. The Bishopric on the other hand explains that the estate was past to them in form of Foundations, so they are only free to spend approximately 1% of the funds, while the children received approximately 25%. One individual who benefited, was Joan Pujol, a vicar who was appointed executor of the will in his personal capacity, not as a member of the church, and also received 5% of the inheritance. This state of affairs led the archbishop of Urgell "banished" Pujol to Balaguer.
