= Lori Montenegro =

Cuban-American journalist

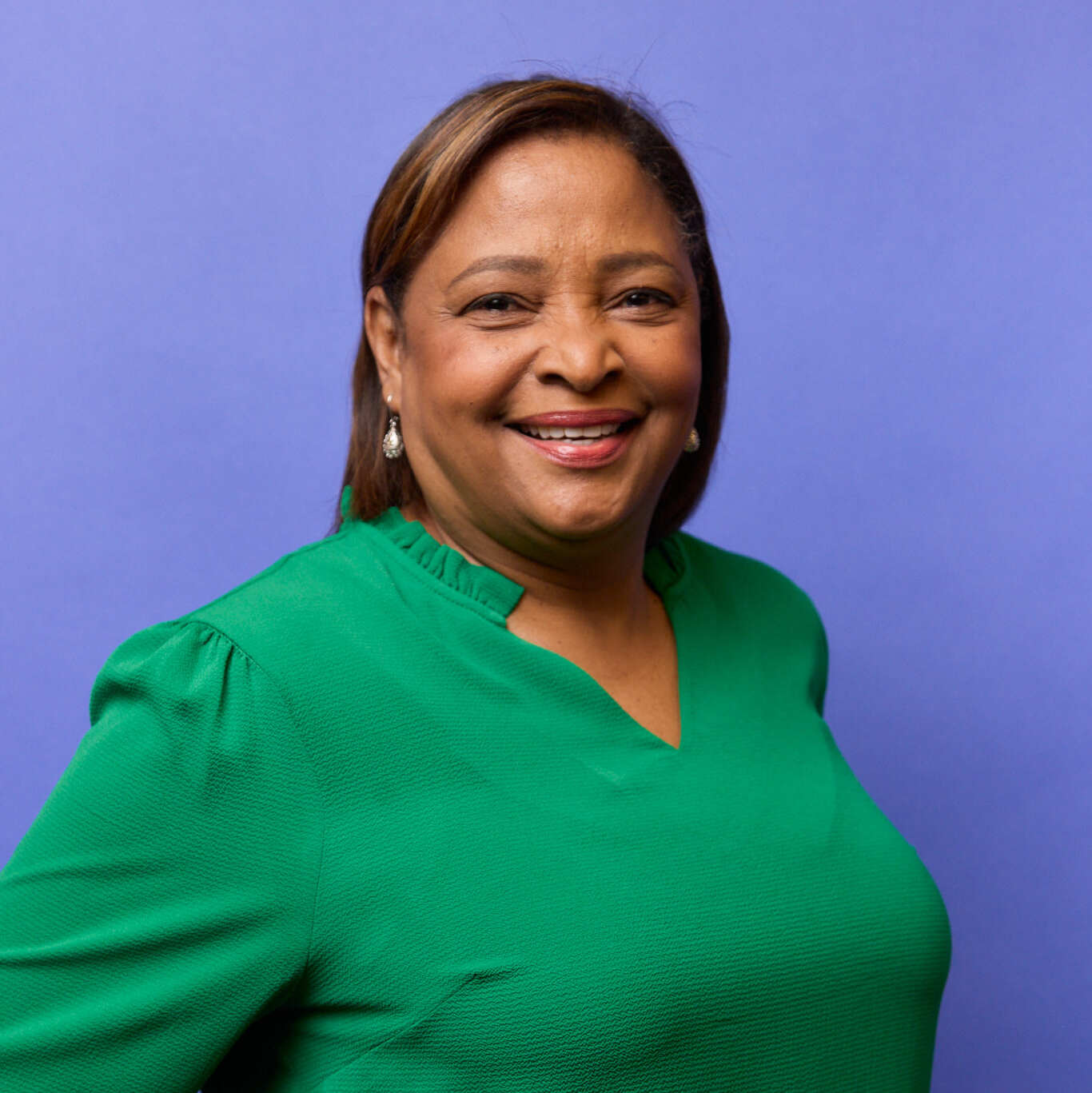
- Montenegro in 2025
- Born: November 8, 1959 (age 66); Santiago de Cuba, Cuba
- Occupation: Journalist
- Employer: NBCUniversal

Lori Montenegro (born November 8, 1959) is a Cuban-American journalist in Spanish-language television news. She was born in Santiago de Cuba and raised in Miami, Florida. She reported on major events in the United States' history, with a focus on covering issues concerning the Latin American population. Montenegro has been serving as the first Afro-Latino Washington bureau chief for Noticias Telemundo after 20 years as a Noticias Telemundo's Washington correspondent.

== Early life and education ==
Montenegro was born in Oriente, Santiago de Cuba, in 1959. An only child, Montenegro followed her mother to emigrate to the United States as an infant in January 1960 and was raised in Miami, Florida.

Montenegro studied at Miami-Dade Community College for two years, where she was invited to an interview at a radio station in Miami Beach, which later brought her into the radio station to start her career as a journalist.

== Career ==
Montenegro began her career in journalism in radio, then transitioned to television in Spanish-language news networks in the United States. She became the first Afro-Latino Washington bureau chief for Noticias Telemundo after 20 years as a Noticias Telemundo's Washington correspondent.

Montenegro's reports mainly covered the White House and Capitol Hill, and a wide range of issues related to politics, elections, immigration, health care, economy, and the Latin American population in Washington, D.C. and the United States..

More recently, Montenegro has focused on mental health and journalism. In 2025, she briefed National Press Foundation fellows about the mental health toll on being a journalist and witnessing human struggles, through a co authored article titled Journalism's Mental Health Epidemic.

== Awards and recognition ==
Montenegro received several major awards, including:

- The Congressional Hispanic Caucus Institute's Latina Leader Award
- The UnidosUS Rubén Salazar Award
- The First Amendment Clarity Award from the Radio Television Digital News Association

Montenegro was inducted into the National Association of Hispanic Journalists (NAHJ) Hall of Fame in 2023. She was featured in the Smithsonian's National Museum of American History bilingual exhibit, "¡De última hora!: Latinas Report Breaking News," which honours seven Latina journalists in the same year.

== Impact ==
In 2024, the National Association of Hispanic Journalists established the NAHJ Lori Montenegro Scholarship for students, particularly Afro-Latino students who are pursuing careers in journalism, communications, or marketing in either English or Spanish. The scholarship provides $5,000 in financial support to students seeking careers in journalism or communications.

== External Sources ==
- Smithsonian National Museum of American History bilingual exhibit, "¡De última hora!: Latinas Report Breaking News"
