= Page Miller =

American public historian (born 1940)

Page Putnam Miller
- Born: 12 December 1940; Columbia, South Carolina
- Education: Mary Baldwin College (B.A.); University of Maryland (M.A., Ph.D)
- Occupation: Historian

Page Miller (born 12 December 1940) is an American public historian.

== Life and work ==
Page Putnam Miller was born in Columbia, South Carolina, on 12 December 1940. She was awarded a B.A. degree by Mary Baldwin College in 1963 and then enrolled in the Yale Divinity School, but left before earning her master's degree. Miller earned her M.A. in history at the University of Maryland in 1974 and her Ph.D. five years later. After teaching for a year at the University College of the University of Maryland, she was hired as director of the National Coordinating Committee for the Promotion of History in 1980. In her capacity as director, Miller has coordinated the Organization of American Historians and the National Park Service’s collaborative project to revise the National Park Service’s Thematic Framework. She also served as project director for the Women’s History Landmark Project, a cooperative project of the National Park Service, the Organization of American Historians, and the National Coordinating Committee for the Promotion of History. Miller has written a column for the American Historical Society's AHA Perspectives as well as one for Archival Outlook, published by the Society of American Archivists. She has also testified multiple times before committees or subcommittees of the U.S. House of Representatives and Senate.
