= Theodore Bibb =

American jazz drummer

- Born: January 26, 1918
- Origin: United States
- Died: November 21, 2010 (aged 92)
- Genres: Jazz
- Instrument: Drums

Theodore Vincent Bibb (1918 – 2010), was an American jazz drummer. He was one of a number of St. Louis musicians who served in the military during the World War II era. "During his music career he performed with Dewey Jackson, “Peanuts” Whalum, Oliver Nelson, the George Hudson Orchestra, and Singleton Palmer." Bibb died on November 21, 2010, at the age of 92.

== Early life ==
Bibb served in the United States Army where he rose to the rank of Technician fifth grade.
