= Farid Baghlani =

Executed Iranian serial killer

- Born: 1968; Abadan, Iran
- Died: 13 November 2010 (aged 41–42); Karun Prison, Ahvaz, Iran
- Cause of death: Execution by hanging
- Other name: "The Cyclist Killer"
- Conviction: Murder x16
- Penalty: Death

Details
- Victims: 16
- Span of crimes: 2004–2008
- Country: Iran
- State: Khuzestan
- Date apprehended: November 2008

Farid Baghlani (1968 – 13 November 2010), known as The Cyclist Killer, was an Iranian serial killer who killed 15 women and girls, as well as one boy, in the cities of Abadan and Khorramshahr between 2004 and 2008. Claiming that he had done it out of a hatred towards women, he was sentenced to death and subsequently executed for his crimes in 2010.

== Early life ==
Baghlani was born in 1968 in Abadan. Little is known about his upbringing, aside from the fact that he was raised by mother and grandfather. According to Farid, he believed that his mother was actually his cousin for the first few years of his life, and even after learning the truth, their relationship was strained, as she often emotionally abused him. As a result, he grew attached to his grandfather, who was notorious in the area for attacking and beating women on the streets, an attribute which made a great impression on his grandson.

When he became an adult, Baghlani married and had four children, and found a job as a labourer and gardener working for the rich families in Abadan. Over the years, his misogynistic impulses grew, eventually leading to two assault convictions: one in 1995, for which he served a year, and another in 1999, for which he served four. While serving his sentence, Baghlani decided that when he was released, he would start killing his victims as payback for throwing him in prison.

== Murders ==
Soon after his release in 2004, Baghlani would get back to his old job, but when he left work, he would hop on his bicycle and search for victims in groves. After his arrest, he confessed to 16 murders in total, two in Khorramshahr and the rest in Abadan. The murders were as follows:

- late 2004: murder of a young girl, Nour Pour-Ali, in a grove near Khorramshahr. Baghlani fled the city after this murder, but after some months, he felt the urge to kill again.
- 22 September 2005: while passing near the Shatt al-Arab river, Baghlani saw a 10-year-old girl walking by herself. He rode by her and hit her on the head with an iron bar, killing her. When he was about to flee, he saw that the girl's 10-year-old cousin, Hossein, had noticed him. He then killed the young boy as well and then buried both children in a sand dune.
- 6 November 2005: Baghlani killed a 13-year-old girl named Khadijeh Moghaddam. After this murder, he decided that it would be easier to attack his victims from behind.
- December 2005 – January 2006: after seeing 28-year-old Lamieh Savari walking by the Bahmanshir channel, Baghlani got off his bike, caught up to her and beat her to death with an iron bar. After killing her, he buried the body in a nearby sand dune.
- 20 February 2006: a woman identified only by her first name, "Mahin", was killed near a grove in Abadan. Baghlani had approached her from behind and hit her on the head with an iron bar.
- February – July 2006: murder of 12-year-old Fatemeh Naseri in Khorramshahr. No details were given about this crime.
- 16 July 2006: at around 10:30 AM, Baghlani saw 11-year-old Maryam Haddadi playing behind the Taghlani Hospital in Abadan. He got off his bike, went up to the girl and hit her leg with an iron bar, before fatally hitting her on the head. He then stole the girl's bracelets and jewellery and dumped her body on the roadside.
- 20 August 2006: murder of 9-year-old Seyeh Atefeh Pourmahmoud in Abadan. No details were given about this crime.
- August – November 2006: while cruising around Abadan on his bike, Baghlani came across 9-year-old Narges Khalafi, whom he hit with a stick while cycling. After the girl fell to the ground, he got up to her and crushed her skull with an iron bar.
- December 2006: while stalking the groves near Abadan, Baghlani beat to death a 40-year-old woman named Nadimeh Maarezh.
- 6 April 2007: murder of 45-year-old Amina Shafiei. No details were given about this crime. A month later, Baghlani was arrested for one of the murders, but was released on bail after police were unable to gather enough evidence to press charges against him.
- 7 September 2007: murder of a 50-year-old woman identified only by the name "Khadijeh". No details were given about this crime.
- 4 April 2008: murder of 50-year-old Khadijeh Raisi in Abadan, whose body he then threw into a river.
- 26 May 2008: Baghlani kidnapped 9-year-old Fatemeh Kroushat and dragged her to an abandoned building, where he beat her to death with an iron bar.

== Arrest ==
In November 2008, Farid Baghlani was arrested by Abadan police after he was identified via photo lineup by a surviving victim. The woman, Fawzia, had been attacked in September with a knife and left for dead, but managed to survive her injuries and report the attempted murder to police.

In the subsequent interrogations, Baghlani admitted to beating Fawzia, and after evidence pointing towards him as being the elusive Cyclist Killer, he eventually confessed to the 16 murders over the last four years. Baghlani even pointed out mistakes the media had when reporting on the killings and correctly reconstructed the crime scene for each murder. Baghlani explained that he had done this out of hatred towards the weaker sex and that after each murder, he felt a little guilt, but it wasn't sufficient to prevent him from committing more.

Following a preliminary psychiatric exam, which deemed him sane to stand trial, he was brought to trial and charged with the murders. Faced with a likely death penalty, Baghlani recanted his confessions, claiming he had been tortured into signing the confessions by police officials. His claims weren't taken seriously, and he was sentenced to death.

== Execution ==
On 13 November 2010, Farid Baghlani was hanged in Karun Prison in Ahvaz, with the execution witnessed by his parents.

== See also ==
- List of serial killers by country
