= Diocese of Panevėžys =

Latin Catholic diocese in Lithuania

Coordinates: 55°43′N 24°21′E

Diocese of Panevėžys Dioecesis Panevezensis Vyskupija Panevėžio
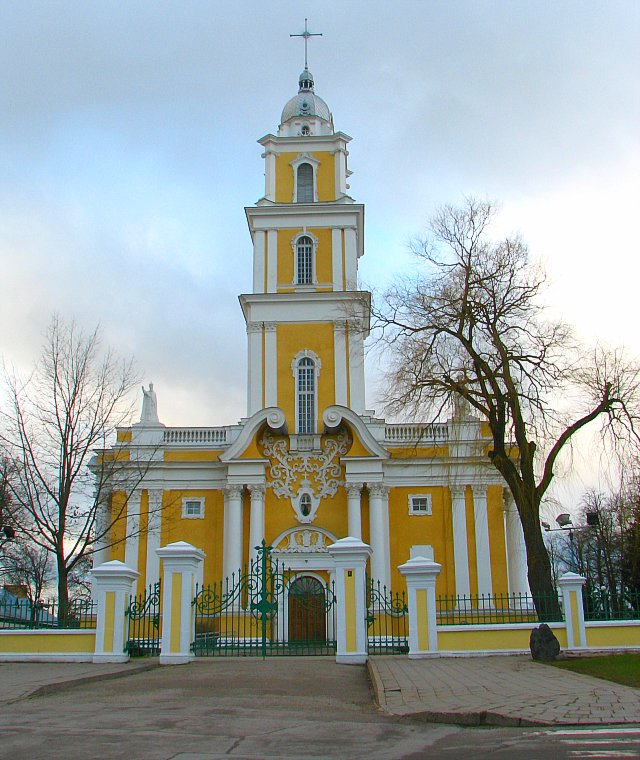
- Christ the King Cathedral, Panevėžys

Location
- Country: Lithuania
- Ecclesiastical province: Vilnius
- Metropolitan: Vilnius

Statistics
- Area: 13,000 km^{2} (5,000 sq mi)
- Population: Total; Catholics: (as of 2016); 381,000; 314,000 (82.4%)

Information
- Denomination: Catholic Church
- Sui iuris church: Latin Church
- Rite: Roman Rite
- Cathedral: Panevėžys Cathedral
- Patron saint: St Casimir

Current leadership
- Pope: Leo XIV
- Bishop: Linas Vodopjanovas, O.F.M.
- Metropolitan Archbishop: Gintaras Grušas
- Bishops emeritus: Jonas Kauneckas; Juozas Preikšas

Map
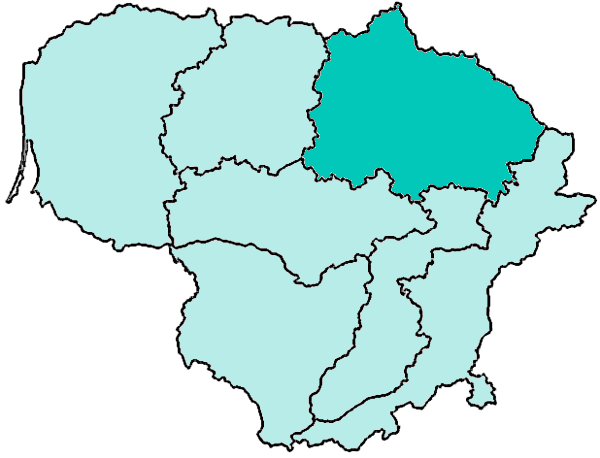
- Location of Diocese of Panevėžys in Lithuania

Website
- Website of the Diocese

The Diocese of Panevėžys (Latin: Panevezen(sis)) is a diocese located in the city of Panevėžys in the ecclesiastical province of Vilnius in Lithuania. It was established on April 4, 1926 from the Diocese of Samogitia. The Christ the King Cathedral is the Bishop's Cathedral of the diocese since the declaration of Pope Pius XI in 1926.

== Leadership ==
- Bishops of Panevėžys (Latin Church)
  - Bishop Linas Vodopjanovas, O.F.M. (elect)
  - Bishop Lionginas Virbalas, SI (2013-08-10 – 2015-06-11)
  - Bishop Jonas Kauneckas (2002-01-05 – 2013-06-06)
  - Bishop Juozas Preikšas (1991-12-24 – 2002-01-05)
  - Bishop Juozas Preikšas (Apostolic Administrator 1989-04-02 – 1991-12-24)
  - Liudvikas Povilonis 1983–1984;
  - Bishop Romualdas Krikščiūnas (Apostolic Administrator 1973-07-06 – 1983-05-15)
  - Bishop Kaziemiras Paltarokas (1926-04-05 – 1957-12-08)
