= Donald S. Kellermann =

American journalist

Donald Simon Kellermann
- Born: February 6, 1927; Brooklyn
- Died: November 10, 2010 (aged 83); Washington D.C., U.S.
- Education: Hofstra University
- Occupation: Journalist

Donald Simon Kellermann (February 6, 1927 – November 10, 2010) was an American journalist who served as the first director of what became the Pew Research Center.

Kellermann was born in 1927 in Brooklyn. He was a radio broadcaster while serving with the United States Army in Germany during World War II and went to work for the Brooklyn Eagle after leaving Hofstra University.

While working for Newsday in 1952, Kellermann agreed to commit a crime in order to be able to write stories from inside jail. He deliberately broke into a bar while working for Newsday so that he could write about his experiences at the Suffolk County Jail. While his reporting from jail led to an investigation of conditions at the facility, the case against him was ultimately thrown out as he had no criminal intent and had not stolen anything. The charges against him were ultimately tossed out.

CBS News hired him as a producer, where programs he created during his more than a decade with the network included interviews with President John F. Kennedy and Prime Minister of Israel David Ben-Gurion, as well as a life story of Charles Dickens. He was later employed by National Educational Television, the predecessor to today's Public Broadcasting Service, where he was the director of cultural programming. He spent five years in the 1970s as chief of staff to U.S. Senator Jacob K. Javits. He co-authored the 1973 book, The President Versus Congress, with Javits. Kellermann later worked for the Joint Republican Leadership Office.

Returning to media, he was hired by the Times Mirror company, publisher of the Los Angeles Times, where he initially worked in Washington, D.C. before moving to Los Angeles to become the firm's director of corporate public affairs. As part of the newspaper company's opinion polling operation, Kellermann was named to serve as the first director of the Times Mirror Center, which would later become known as the Pew Research Center for the People and the Press after The Pew Charitable Trusts initiated sponsorship of the organization in the 1990s.

Opinion polls which he initiated covered attitudes of younger people to newspapers, studied how people's values affected their stand on major issues and published "The Pulse of Europe", a survey of western European nations in the aftermath of the Cold War.

A resident of Washington, D.C., Kellermann died in his home there at the age of 83 on November 10, 2010, from liver cancer. He was survived by his wife, Joan, two daughters and two granddaughters.
