= Romualdas Krikščiūnas =

Lithuanian bishop

Romualdas Krikščiūnas (18 June 1930 in Kaunas, Lithuania – 2 November 2010) was the apostolic administrator of the Roman Catholic Diocese of Panevėžys, Lithuania. He was ordained in 1954 and became bishop in 1966.
