= Tom Allison (English footballer) =

English footballer

Personal information
- Full name: Thomas Allison
- Date of birth: 20 February 1921
- Place of birth: Fencehouses, County Durham, England
- Date of death: 1 November 2010 (aged 89)
- Place of death: Hartlepool, England
- Position: Inside forward

Senior career*
Years	Team	Apps	(Gls)
–	South Hetton		
1946–1947	Darlington	6	(0)
- * Club domestic league appearances and goals

Thomas Allison (20 February 1921 – 1 November 2010) was an English footballer who made six appearances in the Football League playing as an inside forward for Darlington in the 1940s. He also played non-league football for South Hetton. The son of William Allison, a well-known local amateur footballer, Allison signed as a professional with Darlington in October 1946.
