= Domingo Maza Zavala =

Venezuelan economist

Domingo Felipe Maza Zavala (4 November 1922 – 7 November 2010) was a Venezuelan economist. He was director of the Central Bank of Venezuela from 1997 to 2004. He had previously been a member of COPRE (1985) and a Congressional Deputy (1969–1971). A professor at UCV and the IUNEP, he also had a financial column in El Nacional from 1949 to 1963.
