= Takaharu Kondo =

Takaharu Kondo (近藤 崇晴, Kondō Takaharu, March 24, 1944 – November 21, 2010) was a member of the Supreme Court of Japan.
