= Caritas Lithuania =

Lithuanian Catholic social welfare organisation

- Lietuvos Caritas
- Established: 1926; 100 years ago
- Type: Nonprofit
- Purpose: social services, humanitarian relief
- Location: Vilnius, Lithuania
- Region served: Lithuania
- Official language: Lithuanian
- Secretary General: Deimantė Bukeikaitė
- President: Archbishop Kęstutis Kėvalas
- Affiliations: Caritas Europa, Caritas Internationalis
- Website: www.caritas.lt

Caritas Lithuania (Lithuanian: Lietuvos Caritas) is a Catholic not-for-profit social welfare and humanitarian relief organisation in Lithuania. It is a service of the Episcopal Conference of Lithuania. It operated from 1926 to 1940, when it was forbidden by the Soviet authorities, and was restored in 1989.

Caritas Lithuania is a member of both Caritas Europa and Caritas Internationalis.

== History ==
Lithuanian Caritas was established in 1926, bringing together nearly all Catholic educational and charitable organisations. It operated throughout the 1930s until the Soviets banned the organisation and all other Church activities following their occupation of Lithuania in 1940.

In 1988, an underground Catholic women's group named Caritas was formed in Kaunas, with the nun Albina Pajarskaitė of the Convent of the Sisters of the Poor being one of the organisers. It was officially registered on 15 April 1989. The founding convention that took place in the Kaunas Sports Hall for two days and was attended by hundreds of representatives from women's group from all over the country and thousands of guests.

In 1991, following expanded operational opportunities, the "Lithuanian Caritas Federation" (Lietuvos Caritas federacija) was established during an extraordinary congress on June 2, adopting new statutes and the new name. Membership was opened to both men and women. The federation, uniting clergy and laity, aimed to educate society religiously and ethically while addressing social issues and promoting charitable activities. That same year, it became a member organisation of Caritas Internationalis.

In 1992, the Federation initiated the establishment of the Center for Professional Studies in Social Care at Vytautas Magnus University of Kaunas. The organisation's structure was slightly adjusted in July 1994 to encourage greater involvement of Catholic laypeople in charity work. A major reorganization occurred during the 1997 congress, fully integrating Caritas into the structure of the Lithuanian Catholic Church, operating from that point on under the Lithuanian Bishops' Conference. The name was also changed to "Lithuanian Caritas" (Lietuvos Caritas), with priest Robertas Grigas appointed as general director.

At its founding congress, Caritas outlined its long-term activity directions: human upbringing and education, alleviating suffering, and promoting spiritual values. Recognising the most pressing societal issues, Caritas established various initiatives to address them, including charity canteens, nursing homes for the elderly and children, family support centres, nursing hospitals, and a pharmacy.

The organisation offers a wide range of social, medical, and consulting services for socially disadvantaged individuals. It runs public canteens, pharmacies, and nursing, treatment, and care facilities. Since 2005, it has provided food to approximately 180,000 people in need. By 2020, its operations were supported by 250 employees and over 3,000 volunteers. With the start of the Russian invasion of Ukraine in 2022, Caritas Lithuania become active in providing support to Ukrainian refugees arriving in Lithuania, and collecting funds for Caritas projects in Ukraine.

== Structure ==
Caritas Lithuania consists of a national office and of seven regional, autonomous Caritas organisations in Lithuania. They implement social projects locally. The 7 local organisations are:

- Caritas Kaišiadorys
- Caritas Kaunas
- Caritas Panevėžys
- Caritas Šiauliai
- Caritas Telšiai
- Caritas Vilkaviškis
- Caritas Vilnius

== Images ==
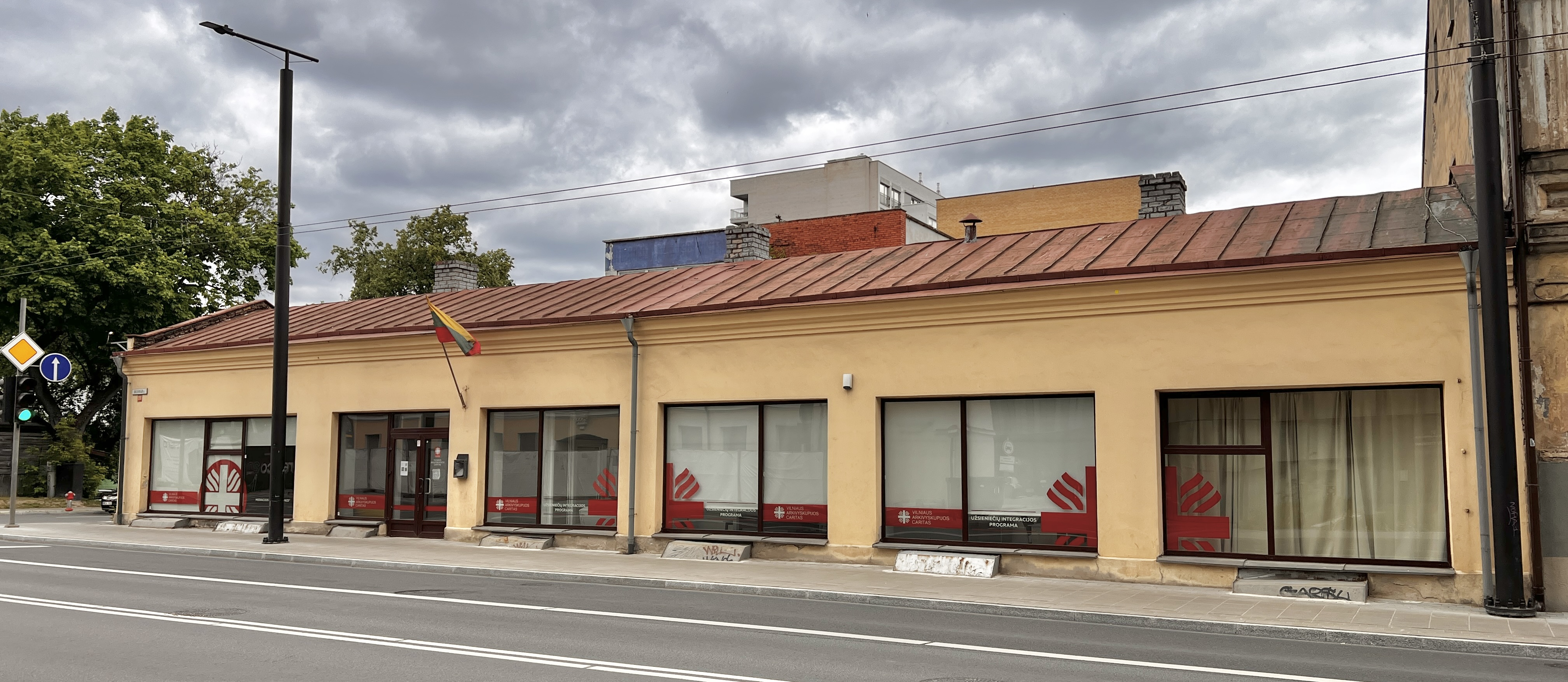
A center of the Archdiocesan Caritas Vilnius in Kalvarijų Street.

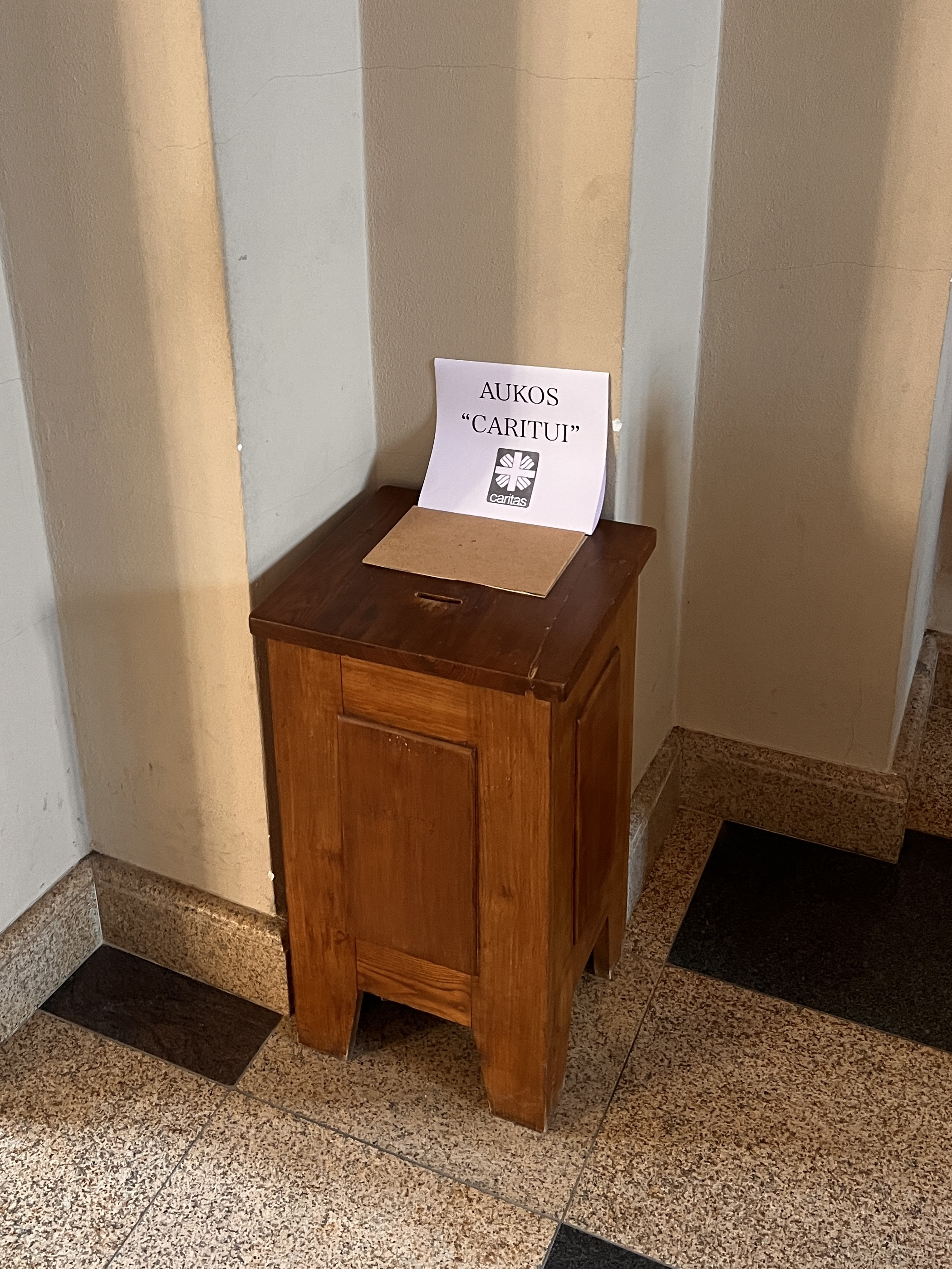
Donation box for Caritas in the Kaunas Cathedral Basilica.

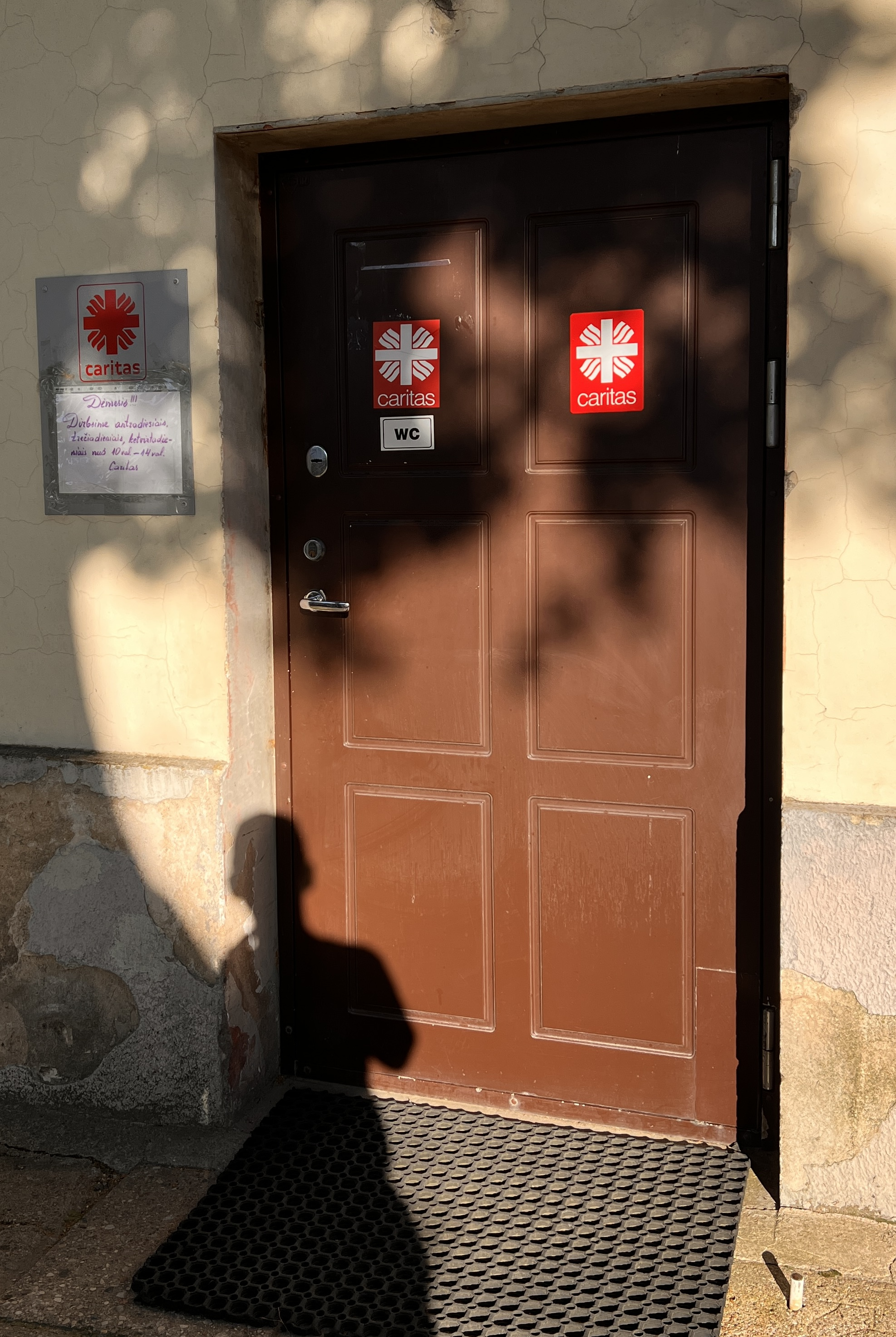
Side door of the Church of St. Anthony of Padua (Kaunas) with signs of the local parish Caritas.
