= Kęstutis Kėvalas =

Roman Catholic archbishop

His Excellency, The Most Rev. Mons. Kęstutis Kėvalas
- Metropolitan Archbishop of Kaunas
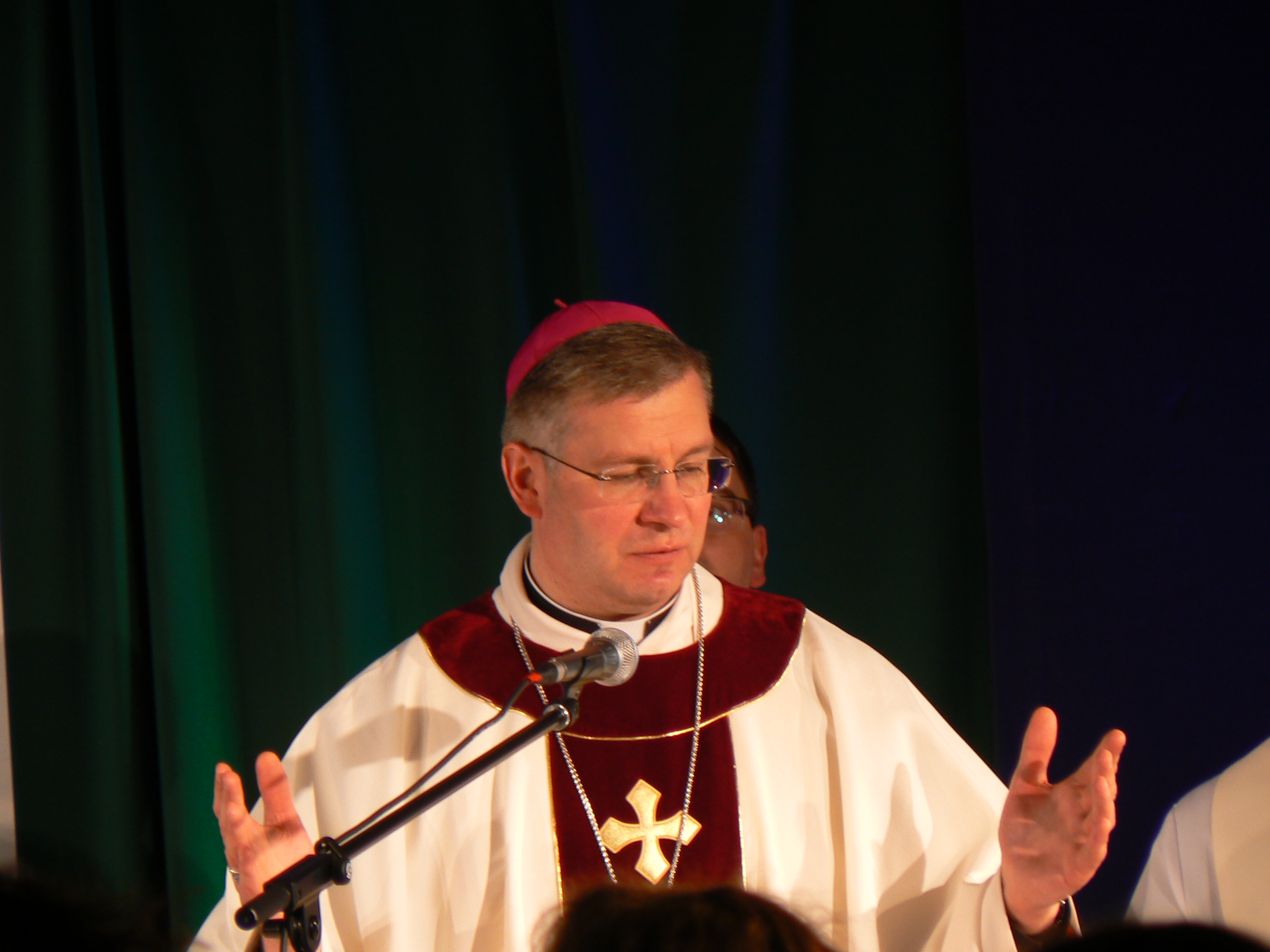
- Kėvalas in 2018
- Church: Roman Catholic
- Diocese: Kaunas
- Appointed: 19 February 2020
- Predecessor: Lionginas Virbalas
- Previous posts: Auxiliary Bishop of Kaunas (2012–2017); Coadjutor Bishop of Telšiai (2017); Bishop of Telšiai (2017–2020)

Orders
- Ordination: 29 June 2000 by Sigitas Tamkevičius
- Consecration: 27 September 2012 by Sigitas Tamkevičius

Personal details
- Born: 17 February 1972 (age 54) Kaunas, Lithuanian SSR, Soviet Union
- Motto: Christus spes mea
- Coat of arms

Kęstutis Kėvalas (17 February 1972) is a Lithuanian prelate of the Catholic Church who has been the Metropolitan Archbishop of Kaunas since 2020. He has been a bishop since 2012, serving first as an auxiliary bishop of Kaunas from 2012 to 2017 and then as bishop of Telšiai from 2017 to 2020.

In his role of archbishop, he is also the president of Caritas Lithuania.

== Biography ==
Kęstutis Kėvalas was born in Kaunas, Lithuanian Soviet Socialist Republic (now the Republic of Lithuania), on 17 February 1972. He attended secondary school in Šančiai and music school in Kaunas. From 1990 to 1992 he studied radioelectronics at Kaunas University of Technology. From 1993 to 1997 he studied theology and philosophy at the Kaunas Priest Seminary. He continued his studies at the Seminary of St. Mary in Baltimore from 1997 to 2000, earning bachelor's and master's degrees in theology. On 29 June 2000, he was ordained at the Cathedral Basilica of St Peter and St Paul. He then returned to St. Mary's and completed his licentiate in theology. His thesis was "Catholic Social Teaching and Economical Development: A Case Study of Lithuania".

From 2001 to 2005 he led the preparatory year program at the Archdiocesan Seminary and served as diocesan youth minister. Beginning in February 2002 he taught a variety of undergraduate classes at Vytautas Magnus University in Kaunas. In September 2003 he started graduate studies in moral theology there and took on additional responsibility for the preparatory year at John Paul II House in Šiluva. He became spiritual director of the Seminary in 2005. He worked on his doctoral thesis in the United States in 2006-2007 and completed his doctorate in January 2008 with a thesis on "The Origins and Ends of the Free Economy as Portrayed in the Encyclical Letter Centesimus Annus". He was deputy dean of the Faculty of Catholic Theology at Vytautas Magnus from 2009 to 2011 and then program director of Radio Maria from 2010 to 2012.

On 27 September 2012, Pope Benedict XVI appointed him titular bishop of Abziri and auxiliary bishop of Kaunas. He received his episcopal consecration on 24 November from Sigitas Tamkevičius, Archbishop of Kaunas. Within the Lithuanian Bishops' Conference he was elected chairman of the council of social affairs in 2013 and re-elected in 2014. In August 2015, in anticipation of the Synod on the Family, he discussed the Church's challenges in confronting contemporary culture.

On 20 April 2017, Pope Francis named him Coadjutor Bishop of Telšiai. Kėvalas succeeded as bishop there on 18 September 2017. In January 2018 he was elected chairman of the Commission for Education of the Lithuanian Bishops' Conference.

On 19 February 2020, Pope Francis named him Metropolitan Archbishop of Kaunas. He was installed there on 24 June 2020.
