= Lionginas Virbalas =

Lithuanian prelate

His Excellency Lionginas Virbalas, S.J.
- Archbishop-Emeritus of Kaunas, Vice-President of the Lithuanian Bishops' Conference
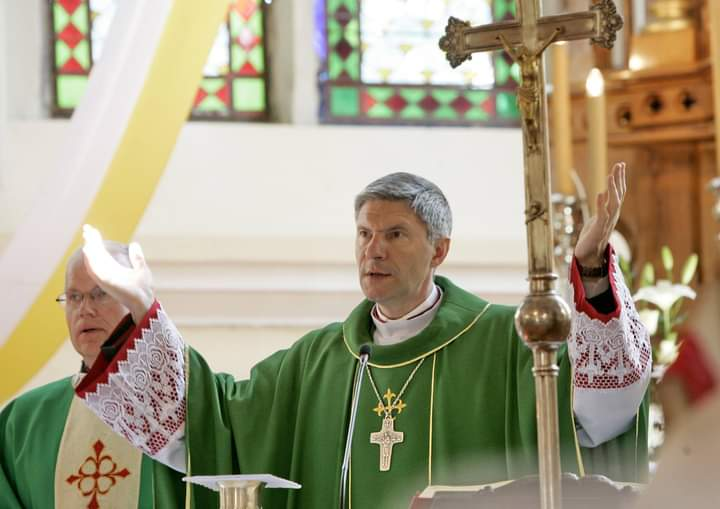
- Church: Roman Catholic Church
- Appointed: 11 June 2015
- Term ended: 1 March 2019
- Predecessor: Sigitas Tamkevičius, S.J.
- Successor: Kęstutis Kėvalas
- Previous posts: Rector of the Collegium Russicum (2010–2013); Bishop of Roman Catholic Diocese of Panevėžys (2013–2015)

Orders
- Ordination: 30 May 1991 (Priest)
- Consecration: 10 August 2013 (Bishop) by Cardinal Audrys Bačkis

Personal details
- Born: Lionginas Virbalas; 6 July 1961 (age 64) Biržai, Lithuanian SSR (present day Lithuania)
- Coat of arms

Archbishop Lionginas Virbalas, S.J. (born 6 July 1961) is a Lithuanian prelate of the Catholic Church who served as the Archbishop of the Kaunas from 11 June 2015 until 1 March 2019. He was Bishop of the Roman Catholic Diocese of Panevėžys from 6 June 2013 until 11 June 2015.

== Life ==
Virbalas was born on 6 July 1961 in Biržai, Lithuanian SSR, present day Lithuania), in the Diocese of Panevėžys. After graduating from the local school, he studied at the Vilnius Civil Engineering Institute (1979–1981). He interrupted his studies to fulfill his compulsory service requirement in the Soviet Army from 1981 to 1983. In 1983 he entered the Inter-Diocesan Theological Seminary in Kaunas, which was soon closed by the Soviet authorities. He then studied theology clandestinely and in 1986 entered the Theological Seminary and then the Jesuits in 1989. He was ordained a priest on 30 May 1991, after completed his philosophical and theological studies. He made his solemn profession as a Jesuit on 27 September 2003.

In 1992 Virbalas continued his studies in Italy and earned a licentiate degree at the Pontifical Gregorian University in 1994. He then fulfilled assignments as professor in the Theological Seminary and University, Rector of the Church of St. Francis Xavier, Kaunas (1995–1997), Rector of the Church of St. Casimir, Vilnius (1998–2005, 2008–2010), and Rector of the Pontifical Collegium Russicum in Rome (2010–2013).

On 6 June 2013, Pope Francis appointed him Bishop of the Roman Catholic Diocese of Panevėžys, and on 30 August 2013 he was consecrated a bishop by Cardinal Audrys Bačkis. On 11 June 2015, Pope Francis appointed him Archbishop of Kaunas. Beginning on 28 October 2014, he was a Vice-President of the Episcopal Conference of Lithuania.

On 1 March 2019 Pope Francis accepted his resignation as Archbishop of Kaunas, which Virbalas had submitted because of health problems. He said he was returning to the exercise of his priestly mission.

Catholic Church titles
Preceded by Alojzij Cvikl	Rector of the Pontifical Collegium Russicum; 2010–2013	Succeeded by Anto Lozuk
Preceded by Jonas Kauneckas	Bishop of Roman Catholic Diocese of Panevėžys; 2013–2015	Succeeded by Linas Vodopjanovas
Preceded by Sigitas Tamkevičius	Archbishop of Roman Catholic Archdiocese of Kaunas; 2015–2019	Succeeded by Kęstutis Kėvalas
