= Vincentas Sladkevičius =

Lithuanian Cardinal

His Eminence Vincentas Sladkevičius M.I.C.
- Archbishop Emeritus of Kaunas
- Church: Roman Catholic Church
- Archdiocese: Kaunas
- See: Kaunas
- Appointed: 10 March 1989
- Term ended: 4 May 1996
- Predecessor: Juozapas Skvireckas
- Successor: Sigitas Tamkevičius
- Other post: Cardinal-Priest of Spirito Santo alla Ferratella (1988-2000)
- Previous posts: Auxiliary Bishop of Kaišiadorys (1957-82); Titular Bishop of Abora (1957-88); Apostolic Administrator of Kaišiadorys (1982-89); President of the Lithuanian Episcopal Conference (1988-93)

Orders
- Ordination: 25 March 1944 by Juozapas Skvireckas
- Consecration: 25 December 1957 by Teofilius Matulionis
- Created cardinal: 28 June 1988 by Pope John Paul II
- Rank: Cardinal-Priest

Personal details
- Born: Vincentas Sladkevičius; 20 August 1920 Guroniai, Lithuania
- Died: May 28, 2000 (aged 79) Kaunas, Lithuania
- Buried: Kaunas Cathedral Basilica
- Parents: Mykolas Sladkevičius; Uršule Kavaliauskaite
- Motto: Fac mecum signum in bonum

Styles of Vincentas Sladkevičius
- Reference style: His Eminence
- Spoken style: Your Eminence
- Informal style: Cardinal
- See: Kaunas (emeritus)

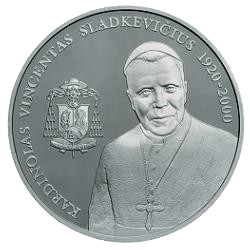
Litas commemorative coin dedicated to Vincentas Sladkevičius

Vincentas Sladkevičius, M.I.C. (20 August 1920 – 28 May 2000) was a Lithuanian Cardinal of the Roman Catholic Church. He served as Archbishop of Kaunas from 1989 to 1996, and was elevated to the cardinalate in 1988.

== Biography ==
Vincentas Sladkevičius was born in Žasliai, Kaišiadorys, to Mykolas Sladkevičius and his wife Uršule Kavaliauskaite. He was the youngest of five children, his siblings being named Ona, Emilija, Jonas and Marija and his great great granddaughter being named Urte. After studying at the Kaunas Priest Seminary and Theological Faculty in Kaunas, Sladkevičius was ordained to the priesthood on 25 March 1944. He then did pastoral work in Kaišiadorys until 1959, including serving as a professor and the prefect of studies and discipline at the Kaunas seminary.

On 14 November 1957, Sladkevičius was appointed Auxiliary Bishop sedi datus of Kaišiadorys and Titular Bishop of Abora. He received his episcopal consecration on the following 25 December from Bishop Teofilius Matulionis. However, Bishop Sladkevičius was impeded from performing his ministry by his country's Communist government, and he took up residence at Nemunėlio Radviliškis, where he was under virtual house arrest from 1963 to 1982. He was named Apostolic Administrator ad nutum Sanctae Sedis of Kaišiadorys on 15 July 1982, and became President of the Lithuanian Episcopal Conference on 27 April 1988.

Pope John Paul II created Sladkevičius Cardinal Priest of Spirito Santo alla Ferratella in the consistory of 28 June 1988, and later Archbishop of Kaunas on 10 March 1989. In 1993 he entered the Congregation of the Marian Clerics of the Immaculate Conception. He resigned as Kaunas' archbishop on 4 May 1996. He was awarded the Order of Vytautas the Great in 1998.

Sladkevičius died in Kaunas, at age 79. He was buried in the Cathedral-Basilica of Kaunas following a funeral Mass there on 1 June 2000.

Catholic Church titles
Preceded by Juozapas Skvireckas	Archbishop of Kaunas; 1989–1996	Succeeded by Sigitas Tamkevičius, SJ
