= Juozapas Matulaitis-Labukas =

Lithuanian Roman Catholic bishop (1894–1979)

- Titular Bishop of Mopta
- Installed: 1965
- Term ended: 1979
- Other posts: Apostolic administrator of Kaunas and Kaišiadorys

Orders
- Ordination: 25 May 1918
- Consecration: 5 December 1965 by Carlo Confalonieri

Personal details
- Born: 19 January 1894 Greikonys, Russian Empire
- Died: 28 May 1979 (aged 85) Kaunas, Lithuanian SSR
- Education: Vilnius Priest Seminary; University of Fribourg

Juozapas Matulaitis-Labukas (19 January 1894 – 28 May 1979) was Lithuanian Roman Catholic titular bishop who served as the apostolic administrator of Kaunas and Kaišiadorys from 1965 to 1979.

Matulaitis-Labukas was ordained as a priest in 1918. He studied at universities in Germany and Switzerland graduating with a PhD in sociology in 1926. He returned to Lithuania where he became the vicar general (1928–1946) of the newly established Diocese of Kaišiadorys. In 1946, he was arrested by the Soviets and sentenced to ten years in Gulag. He returned to Lithuania in 1955 and taught at Kaunas Priest Seminary from 1957 to 1965 when he was elected as the apostolic administrator of Kaunas and Kaišiadorys. While attending the Second Vatican Council, he was consecrated as the Titular Bishop of Mopta.

== Biography ==
=== Early life and education ===
Juozapas Matulaitis-Labukas was born on 19 January 1894 to a family of poor peasants in Greikonys then part of the Russian Empire. He attended primary schools in Butrimonys, Punia, Jieznas before enrolling at the Vilnius 1st Gymnasium. In 1912, he began studies at the Vilnius Priest Seminary. He graduated in 1918 and was ordained as a priest on 26 May 1918.

He then briefly served as a vicar in Žasliai and Kalesninkai. From 1920 to 1922, he was a vicar in Švenčionys as well as a chaplain and teacher of religion, Lithuanian and Latin languages at a local gymnasium. He established a bookstore of Lithuanian publications and two orphanages. In 1922, bishop Jurgis Matulaitis sent Matulaitis-Labukas to study sociology at western universities. He studied at the Universities of Münster, Würzburg, Fribourg, and graduated in 1926 with a PhD after defending a thesis on workers' insurance in the Baltic states.

=== Interwar Lithuania ===
After his studies, Matulaitis-Labukas returned to the portion of the Diocese of Vilnius that remained within the interwar Lithuania after Vilnius Region was captured by Poland in 1920. In 1926, this portion of the diocese became the new Diocese of Kaišiadorys. Matulaitis-Labukas was chancellor of the curia and vicar general (from 1928) under bishop Juozapas Kukta. After his death in 1942, Matulaitis-Labukas administered the diocese until the appointment of new bishop Teofilius Matulionis. Matulaitis-Labukas worked to organize the new diocese and arrange its financial, legal, and administrative affairs, including building new bishop's residence and cathedral. Matulaitis-Labukas was promoted to diocese prelate in 1928 and to papal domestic prelate in 1934.

=== Soviet era ===
On 18 December 1946, Matulaitis-Labukas was arrested by the Soviet KGB. He was sentenced to ten years in a Gulag. He returned to Lithuania in 1955 and lived as an altarista to Raseiniai. In 1957, he was able to transfer to Kaunas Priest Seminary as professor of canon law, patristics, French and Latin languages. During this time, he prepared a 30,000-word Lithuanian–Latin dictionary. He taught there until 1965.

In spring 1959, Matulaitis-Labukas agreed to maintain regular contacts with the KGB. In mid-1960s, he became an agent codenamed "Daktaras". KGB hoped that Matulaitis-Labukas would improve relation between the church and the state, promote moderate clergy who were more amenable to Soviet ideology, deny or minimize Soviet anti-religious campaigns, and even assist with infiltrating Vatican.

On 8 May 1965, the curia of the Archdiocese of Kaunas elected Matulaitis-Labukas as the administrator of Kaunas and Kaišiadorys Dioceses. He was allowed to attend the Second Vatican Council. While in Rome, he was appointed as the apostolic administrator of Kaunas and Kaišiadorys by Pope Paul VI. He was ordained as the Titular Bishop of Mopta by cardinal Carlo Confalonieri on 5 December 1965. The ceremony was held at the chapel of the Missionary Oblates of Mary Immaculate in Rome. In 1966, after the death of bishop Petras Maželis, Matulaits-Labukas was also elected as the chairman of the Lithuanian Bishops' Conference. He continued in thee roles until his death.

Matulaitis-Labukas died on 28 May 1979 and was buried in the churchyard of the Basilica of the Nativity of the Blessed Virgin Mary, Šiluva.
