= Liudvikas Povilonis =

Liudvikas Povilonis M.I.C.
- Titular Archbishop of Arcavica
- Church: Catholic Church
- See: Arcavica
- In office: 7 November 1969 – 2 August 1990
- Predecessor: Position established
- Successor: Cristián Caro Cordero
- Previous posts: Apostolic Administrator of Kaunas & Vilkaviškis (1979-1988); Coadjutor Apostolic Administrator of Kaunas & Vilkaviškis (1973-1979); Auxiliary Bishop of Telšiai (1969-1973)

Orders
- Ordination: 29 June 1934
- Consecration: 21 December 1969 by Juozapas Matulaitis-Labukas

Personal details
- Born: 25 August 1910 Mikieriai (near Leliūnai), Kovno Governorate, Vilna Governorate-General, Northwestern Krai, Russian Empire
- Died: 2 August 1990 (aged 79) Kaunas, Lithuania

Liudvikas Povilonis (Liudas Povilionis) (25 August 1910 - 2 August 1990) was a Lithuanian priest, archbishop, Apostolic Administrator of Roman Catholic Archdiocese of Kaunas (1979-1988), bishop of the Roman Catholic Diocese of Panevėžys (1983-1984), archbishop of the Roman Catholic Diocese of Vilkaviškis (1979-1988), Auxiliary of the Apostolic Administrator of Kaunas Archdiocese and Vilkaviškis Diocese (1973–1979).

He was buried at the cemetery of Marijampolė Basilica.
