= List of Catholic dioceses in Lithuania =

The Catholic Church in Lithuania is currently entirely Latin and composed of

- two ecclesiastical provinces, with a total of five suffragan dioceses.
- the exempt military ordinariate.

== Episcopal Conference of Lithuania ==
=== Exempt jurisdiction sui iuris ===
- Military Ordinariate of Lithuania (Lietuvos kariuomenės ordinariatas)

=== Ecclesiastical Province of Kaunas ===
- Metropolitan Archdiocese of Kaunas
  - Diocese of Šiauliai
  - Diocese of Telšiai
  - Diocese of Vilkaviškis

=== Ecclesiastical Province of Vilnius ===
- Metropolitan Archdiocese of Vilnius
  - Diocese of Kaišiadorys
  - Diocese of Panevėžys

== Defunct jurisdictions ==
There are no titular sees.

All Latin defunct jurisdictions have current successors, unlike the only Eastern Catholic diocesan see(s).

The Ukrainian Catholic Eparchy of Vilnius (Byzantine Rite, since 1809) was suppressed in 1828 and immediately replaced by the Ukrainian Catholic Eparchy of Žyrovyci, only to be suppressed again in 1833, without successor.

== Sources and external links ==
- GCatholic
- http://www.catholic-hierarchy.org/country/dlt.html
