= Juozas Žemaitis =

Lithuanian Roman Catholic prelate (1926–2021)

Juozas Žemaitis M.I.C.
- Bishop of Vilkaviškis
- Church: Catholic Church
- Diocese: Diocese of Vilkaviškis
- In office: 24 December 1991 – 5 January 2002
- Predecessor: Antanas Karosas
- Successor: Rimantas Norvila
- Previous posts: Titular Bishop of Tabaicara (1989-1991); Apostolic Administrator of Vilkaviškis (1989-1991)

Orders
- Ordination: 25 September 1949
- Consecration: 18 March 1989 by Vincentas Sladkevičius

Personal details
- Born: 30 August 1926 Sparviniai (northeast of Barzdai), Šakiai County, Lithuania
- Died: 5 October 2021 (aged 95) Marijampolė, Marijampolė County, Lithuania

Juozas Žemaitis, M.I.C., (30 August 1926 – 5 October 2021) was a Lithuanian Roman Catholic prelate and member of the Congregation of Marian Fathers of the Immaculate Conception. He served as the Bishop of the Roman Catholic Diocese of Vilkaviškis from 1991 until his retirement in October 2002.

Žemaitis was born on 30 August 1926 in Sparviniai, Šakiai District Municipality, Lithuania. He was ordained as a Catholic priest on 25 September 1949.

Bishop emeritus Juozas Žemaitis died in Marijampolė, Lithuania on 5 October 2021, at the age of 95. He was buried in the crypt of St. Michael the Archangel Roman Catholic Cathedral in Marijampolė on 8 October 2021.
