= Kaunas Archcathedral Basilica =

Roman Catholic archcathedral basilica in Kaunas, Lithuania

- Kaunas Archcathedral Basilica of Apostles St. Peter and St. Paul
- Kauno Šv. apaštalų Petro ir Povilo katedra bazilika
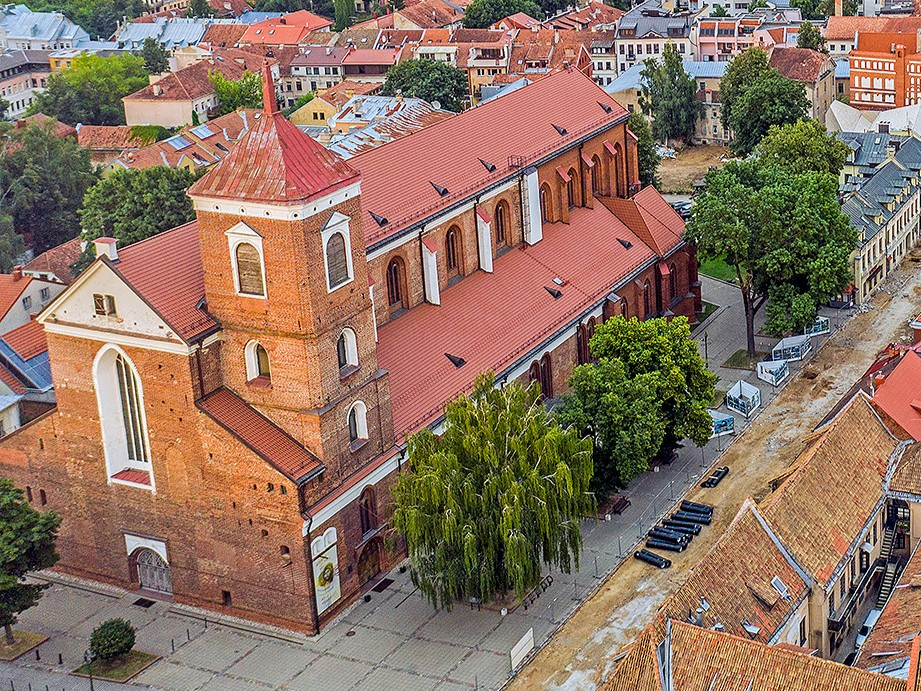
- Aerial view of Kaunas Archcathedral Basilica
- Location within Kaunas
- 54.897°N 23.889°E
- Location: Vilniaus g. 1, Old Town, Kaunas
- Country: Lithuania
- Denomination: Roman Catholic
- Website: kaunoarkikatedra.lt

History
- Status: Archcathedral Basilica
- Founder: Vytautas the Great
- Consecrated: 1413

Architecture
- Functional status: Active
- Style: Late Gothic and Brick Gothic

Specifications
- Materials: Red brick

Administration
- Province: Kaunas
- Archdiocese: Roman Catholic Archdiocese of Kaunas

Clergy
- Bishop: Kęstutis Kėvalas

Cultural Monuments of Lithuania
- Type: National
- Designated: 10 October 2002
- Reference no.: 842

The Archcathedral Basilica of Apostles St. Peter and St. Paul of Kaunas (Lithuanian: Kauno Šv. apaštalų Petro ir Povilo katedra bazilika) is a Roman Catholic Archcathedral basilica in Kaunas, Lithuania, the seat of the Archbishop of Kaunas.

== History ==
The church establishment is attributed to the Grand Duke of Lithuania Vytautas the Great. The exact date of the construction of the first Gothic-style church dedicated to the apostles Saint Peter and Saint Paul is unknown, as written records have not survived. However, the church must have already been built by 22 April 1413, when the Bishop of Vilnius held an indulgence feast there. In around 1430, Vytautas the Great granted the church an endowment. The first parochial school in Kaunas at the St. Peter and St. Paul church was mentioned in 1473. The construction works were concluded only in 1624.

The church suffered severe damage during the war with Russia in 1655 and was rebuilt in 1671, incorporating some Renaissance-style features. It was again damaged in 1707 during the Great Northern War, when the Swedish Army captured Kaunas. A great fire in 1732 destroyed the interior, furnishings, and finishes, and caused both towers to collapse. The interior was subsequently reworked in the Rococo style, though only one of the towers was rebuilt as part of renovations funded by King and Grand Duke Stanisław August Poniatowski in 1771. The main altar, lectern, and choir were installed by Tomasz Podhajski in 1775.

The present form of the building dates from a renovation completed in 1800. From 1808 to 1864, the church was administered by the Augustinians by order of the Russian authorities, who governed Lithuania following the Partitions of the Polish–Lithuanian Commonwealth in 1795. After the failed January Uprising of 1863, in an effort to restrict the pro-Lithuanian activities of Bishop Motiejus Valančius, the Tsarist government transferred the seat of the Diocese of Samogitia from Varniai to Kaunas, after which the church became the cathedral of the diocese.

The church was officially elevated to cathedral status by Pope Leo XIII in 1895. In 1921, the cathedral was granted the title of Minor Basilica. Following the signing of the Concordat of Lithuania with the Vatican in 1926, an ecclesiastical province of Lithuania was established, Diocese of Samogitia was reorganized into the Metropolitan Archdiocese of Kaunas by Pope Pius XI, and the cathedral became the archcathedral, the principal church of Lithuania until 1939.

The building was listed on the Registry of Immovable Cultural Heritage Sites of the Republic of Lithuania in 1996. Pope Francis visited the cathedral on 23 September 2018.

== Architecture ==
The cathedral, being 84 m long, 28 m high and 34 m wide, is the largest Gothic church in Lithuania. The Chapel of the Blessed Sacrament, built in 1895, is an independent extension of the southern nave with carved wood furnishings in the neo-Gothic style.

== Burials ==
- Motiejus Valančius, the bishop of Samogitia, who was also a historian and one of the best known Lithuanian writers of the 19th century, was interred in a crypt of the church in 1875.
- There is also a Neogothic mausoleum of Maironis, one of the most famous Lithuanian romantic poets, near the wall of the chapel.
- Lithuanian Cardinal Vincentas Sladkevičius was also buried in the Kaunas Cathedral Basilica in 2000.
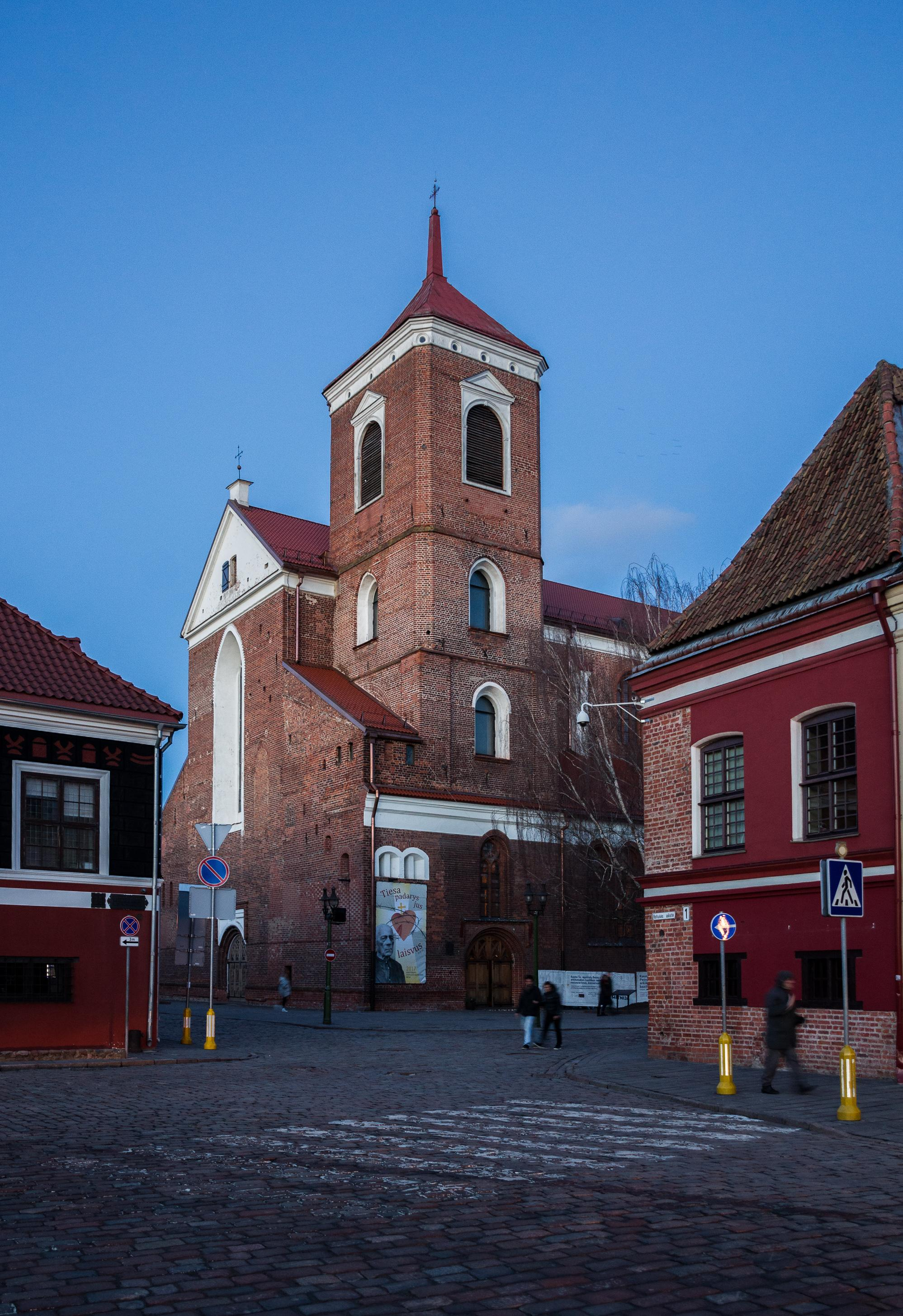
Exterior

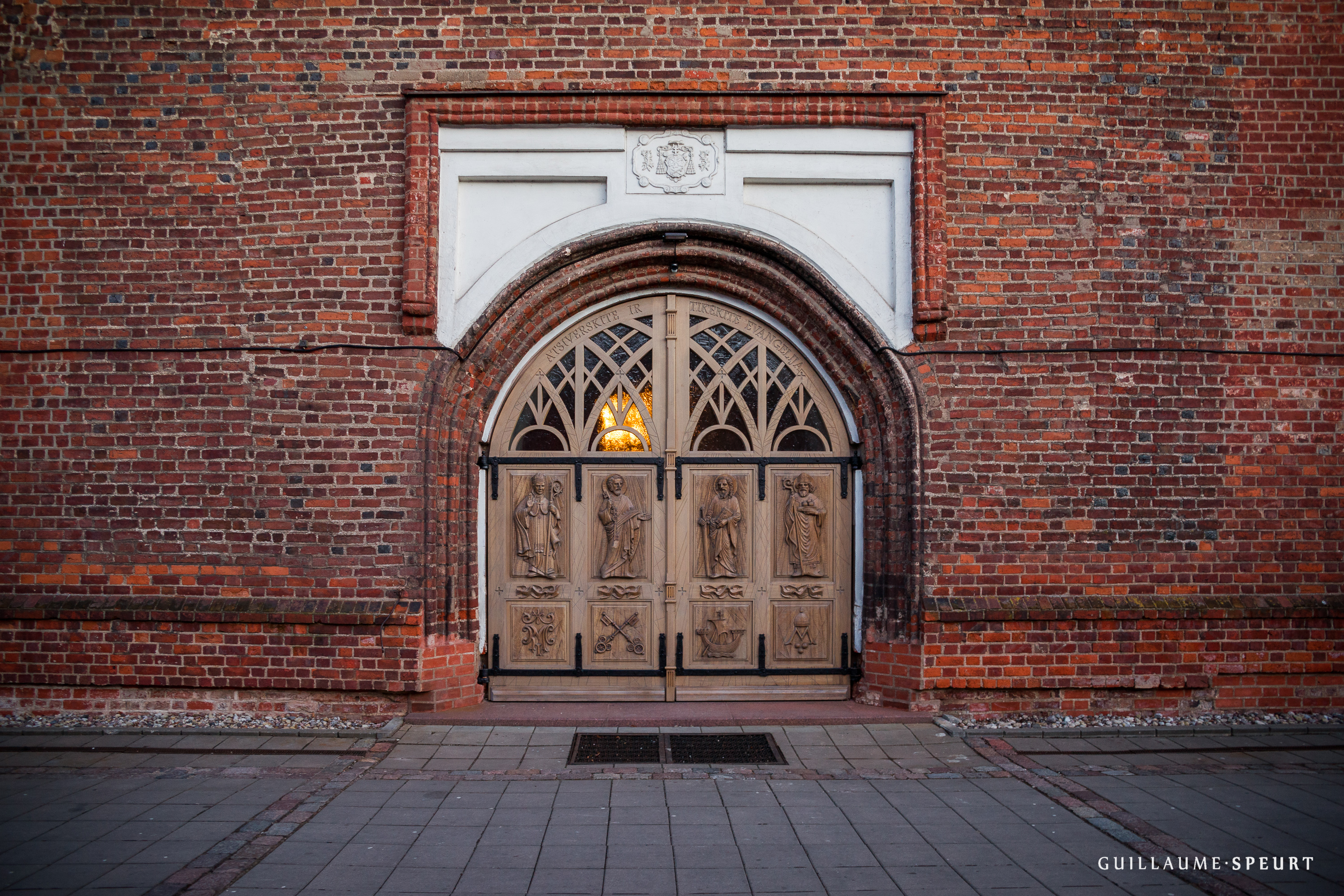
Entrance

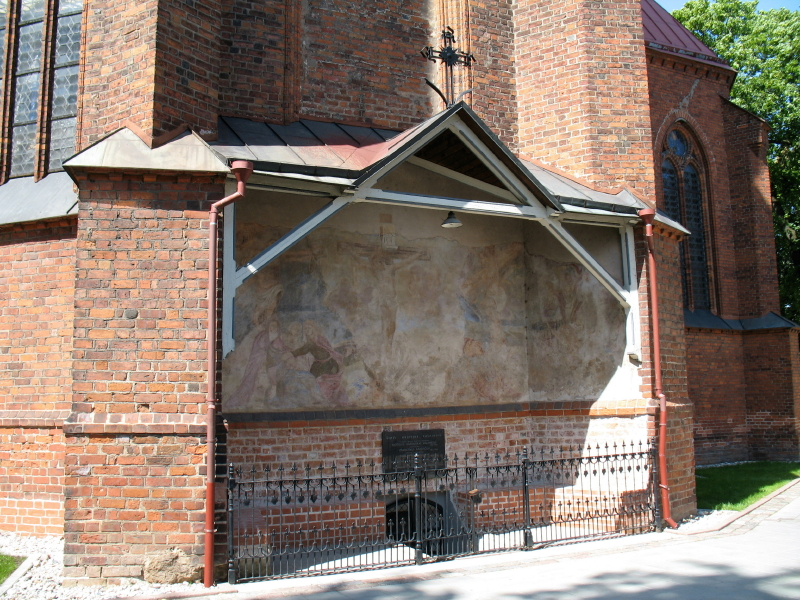
Crypt

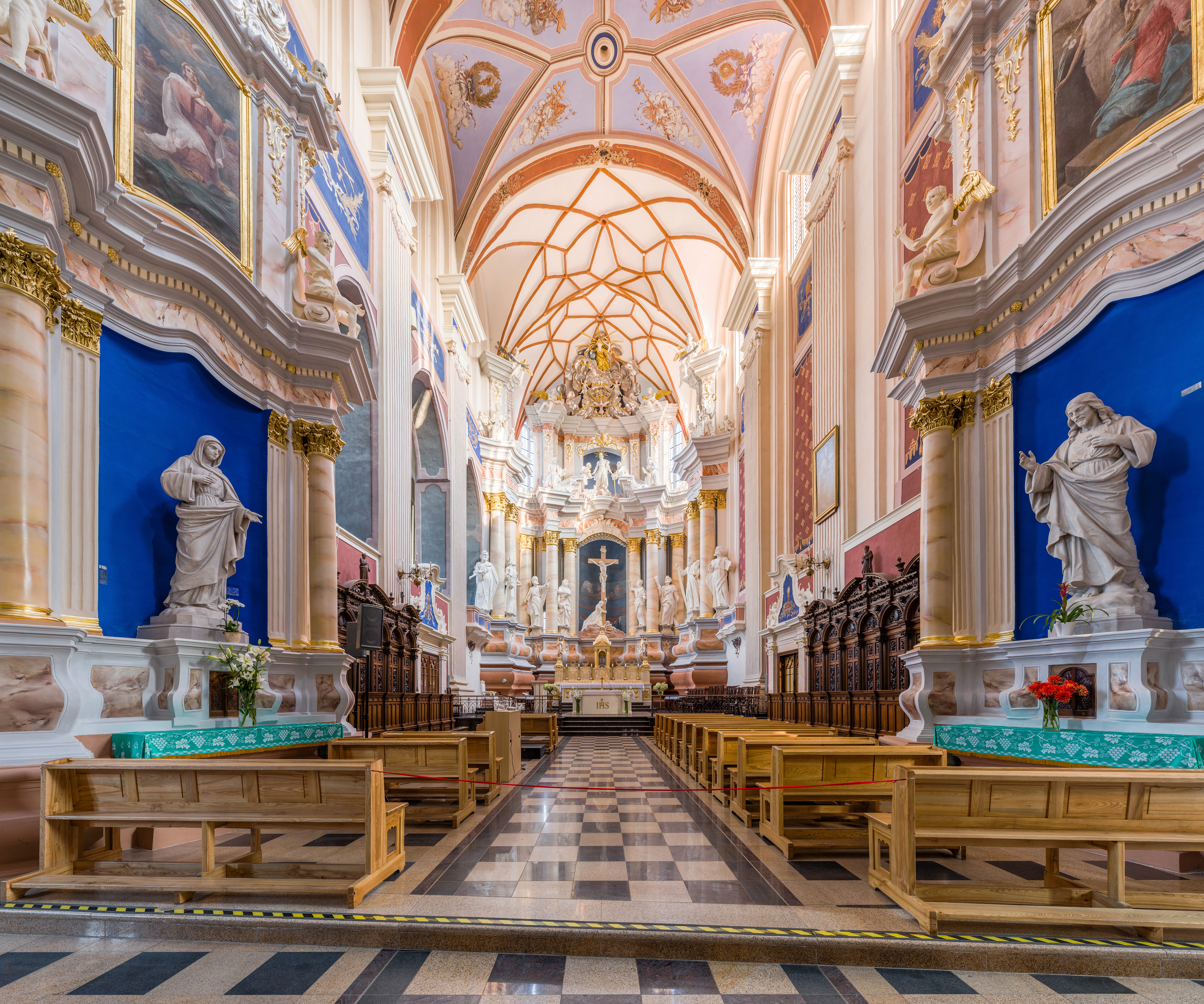
Interior from entrance

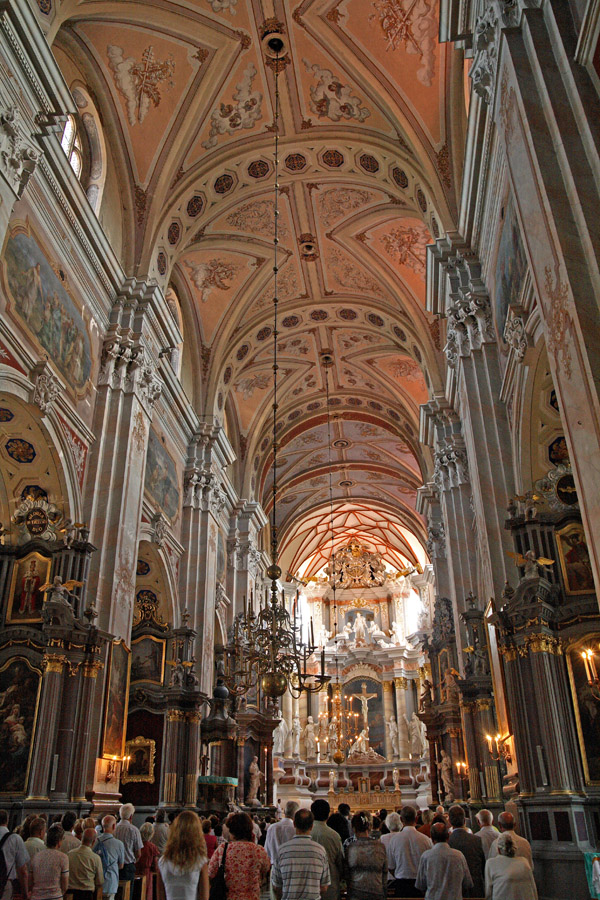
Interior ceiling

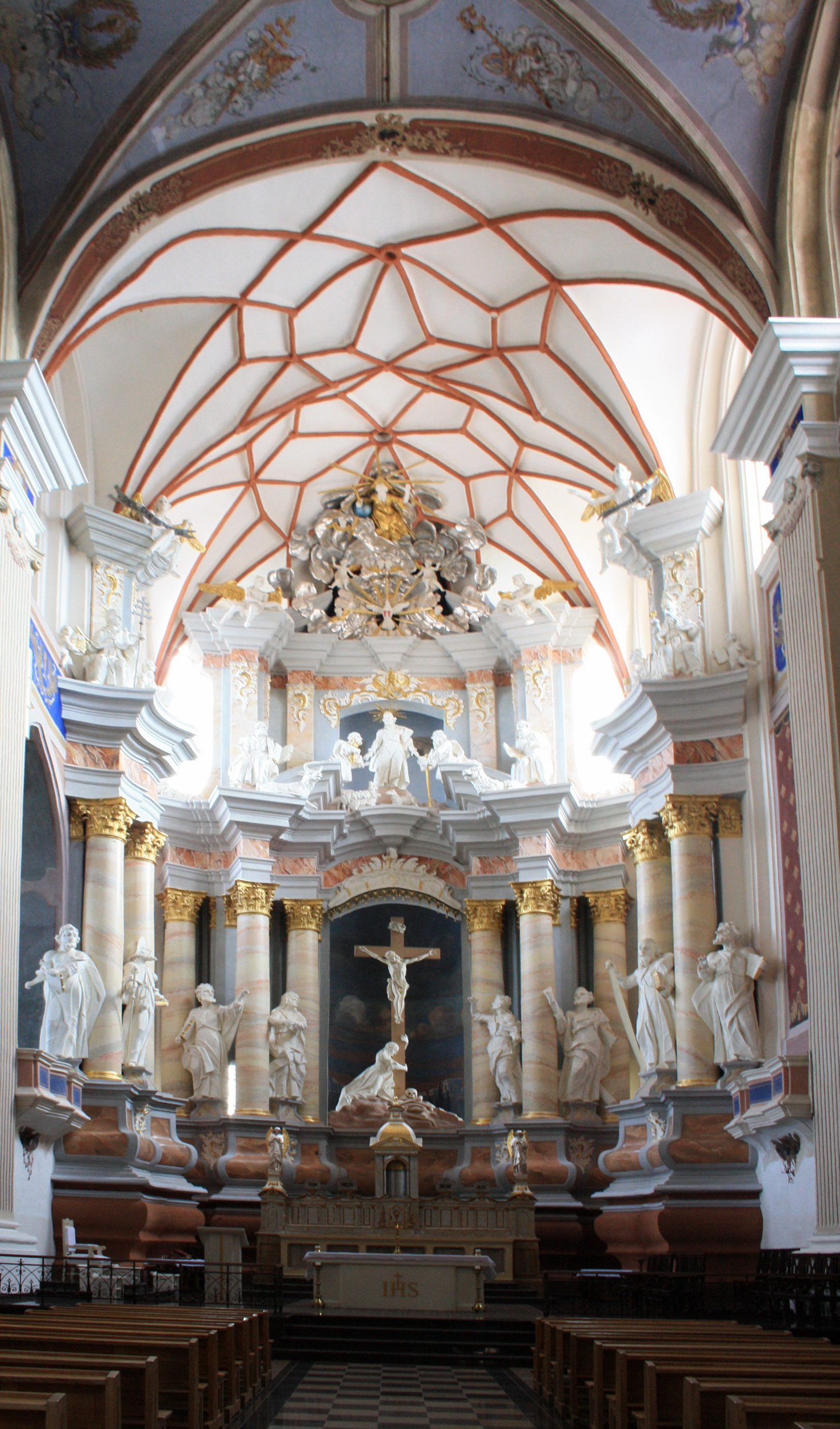
Interior (main altar)

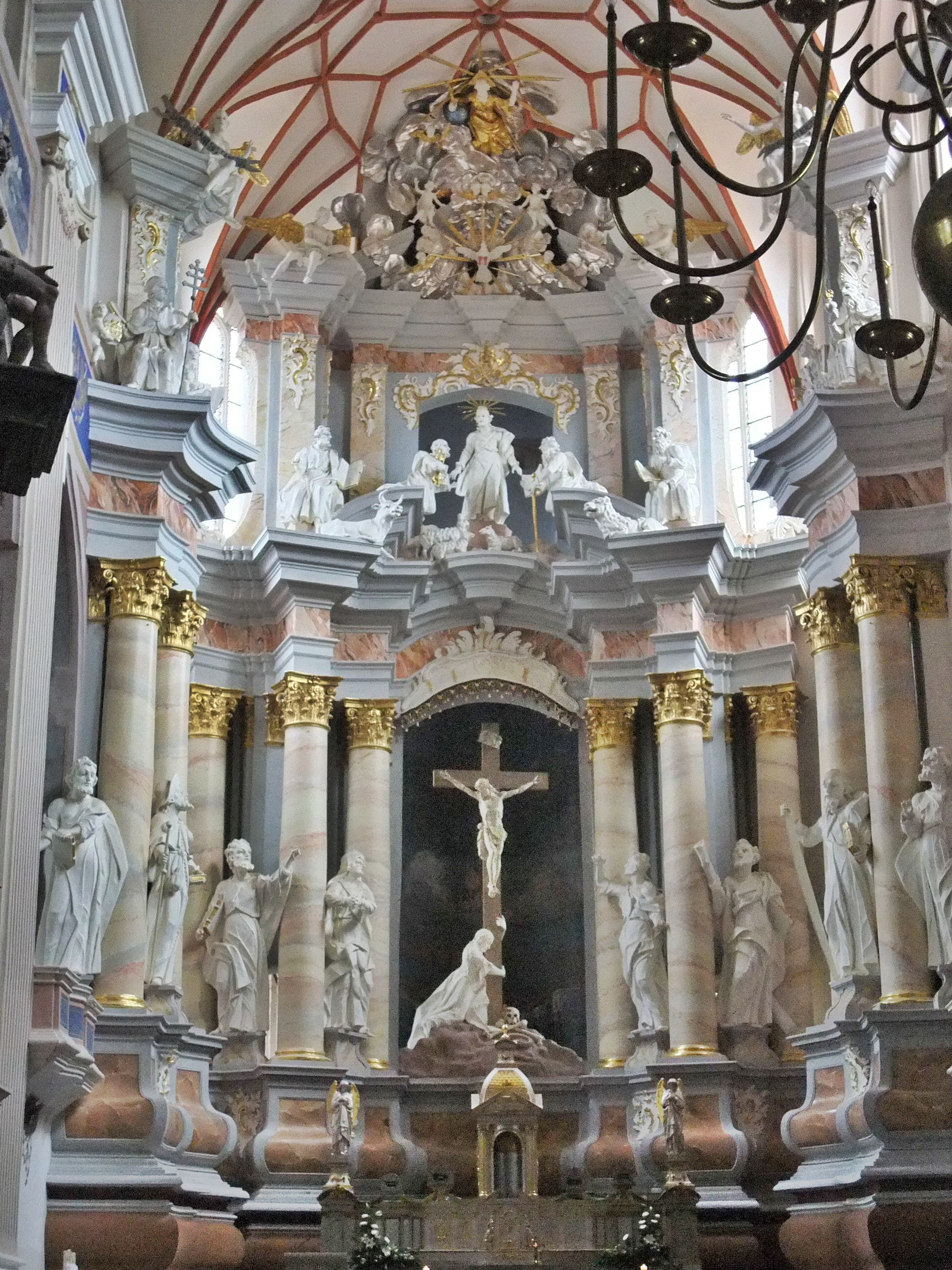
Main altar (current)

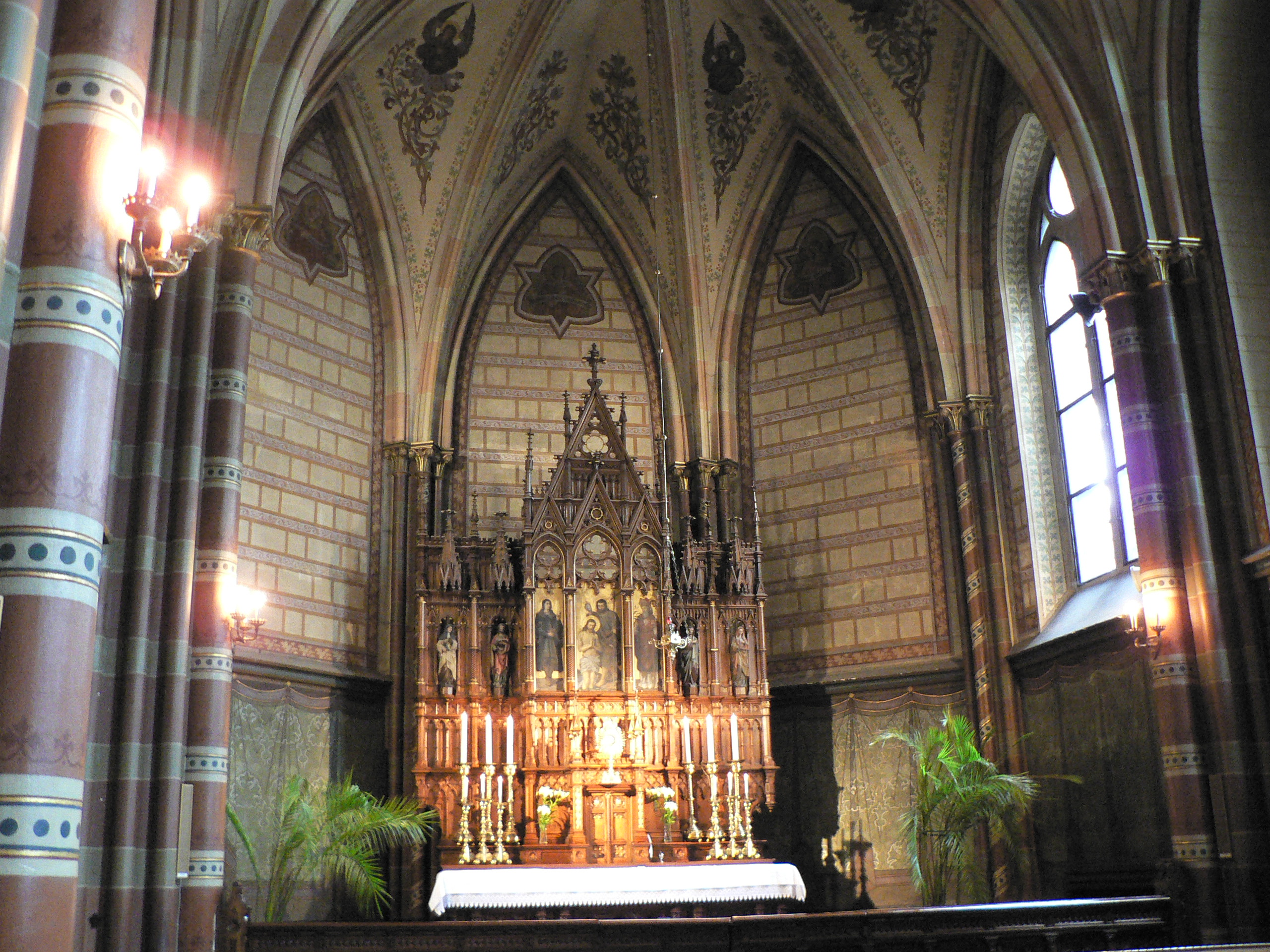
the Blessed Sacrament Chapel of Kaunas Cathedral

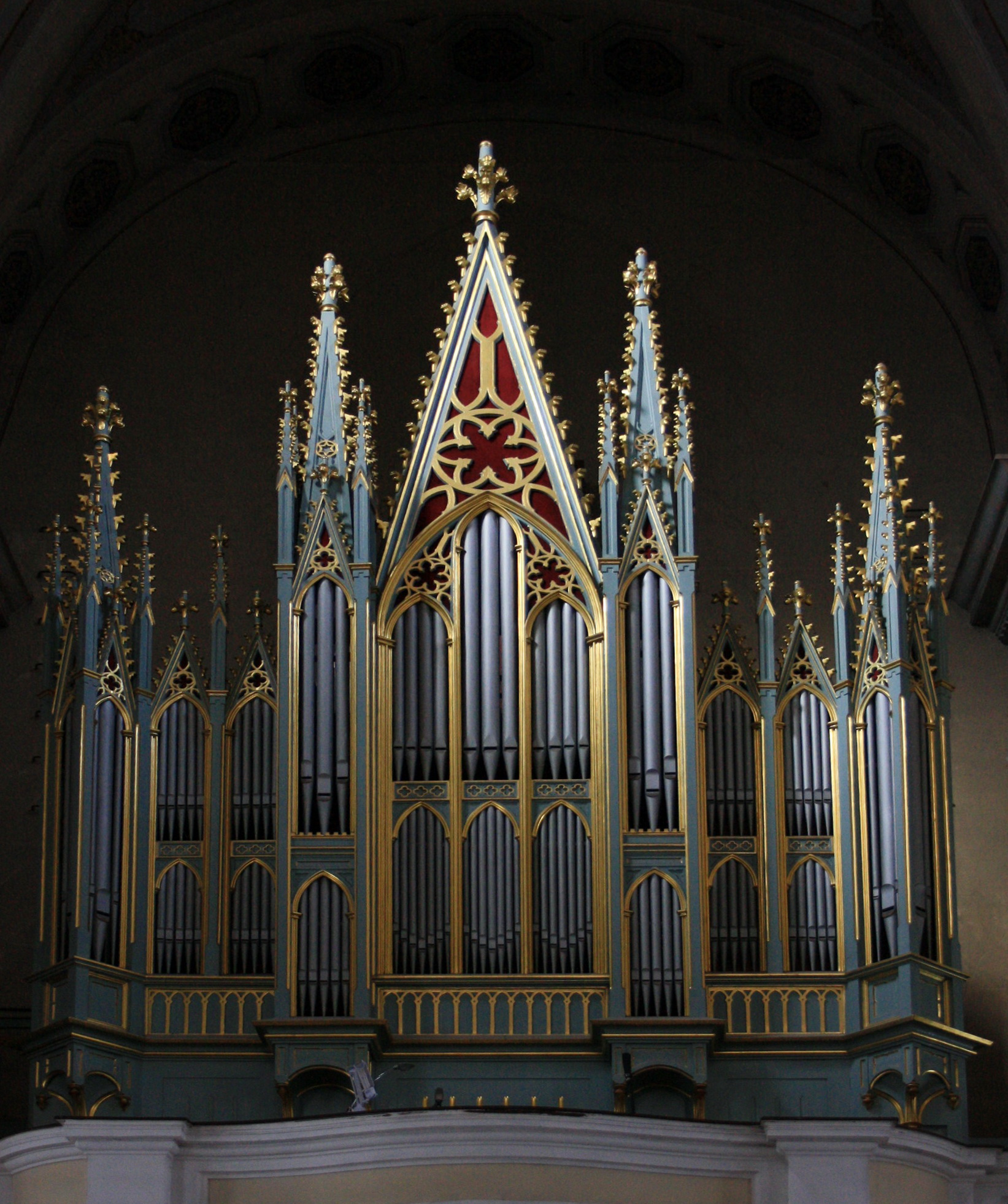
Organ

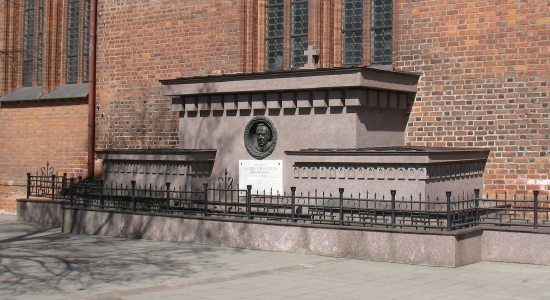
Mausoleum of Maironis

== See also ==
- Gothic architecture in Lithuania
