= Sigitas Tamkevičius =

Lithuanian Catholic prelate, cardinal, and human rights activist

His Eminence Sigitas Tamkevičius S.J.
- Archbishop Emeritus of Kaunas
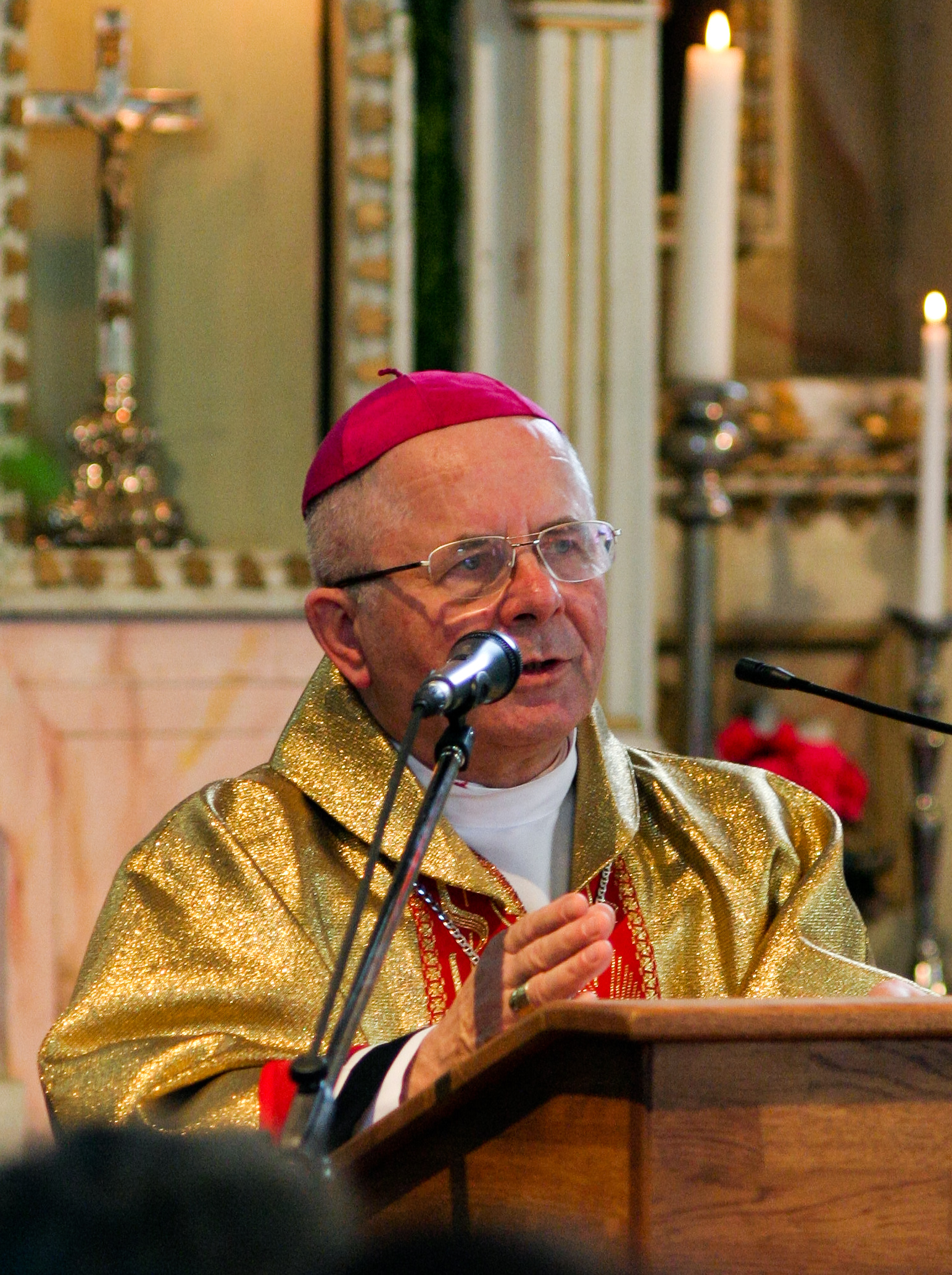
- Tamkevičius in 2010.
- Church: Roman Catholic Church
- Archdiocese: Kaunas
- See: Kaunas
- Appointed: 4 May 1996
- Term ended: 11 June 2015
- Predecessor: Vincentas Sladkevičius
- Successor: Lionginas Virbalas
- Other post: Cardinal-Priest of Sant'Angela Merici (2019-)
- Previous posts: Auxiliary Bishop of Kaunas (1991-96); Titular Bishop of Turuda (1991-96)

Orders
- Ordination: 18 April 1962 by Petras Maželis
- Consecration: 19 May 1991 by Vincentas Sladkevičius
- Created cardinal: 5 October 2019 by Pope Francis
- Rank: Cardinal-Priest

Personal details
- Born: Sigitas Tamkevičius; 7 November 1938 (age 87) Gudonys, Lithuania
- Denomination: Catholic (Roman Rite)
- Education: Kaunas Priest Seminary
- Motto: Dominus illuminatio mea
- Coat of arms

Sigitas Tamkevičius (born 7 November 1938) is a Lithuanian prelate and Cardinal of the Roman Catholic Church and Archbishop emeritus of Kaunas.

Pope Francis raised him to the rank of cardinal on 5 October 2019.

== Biography ==
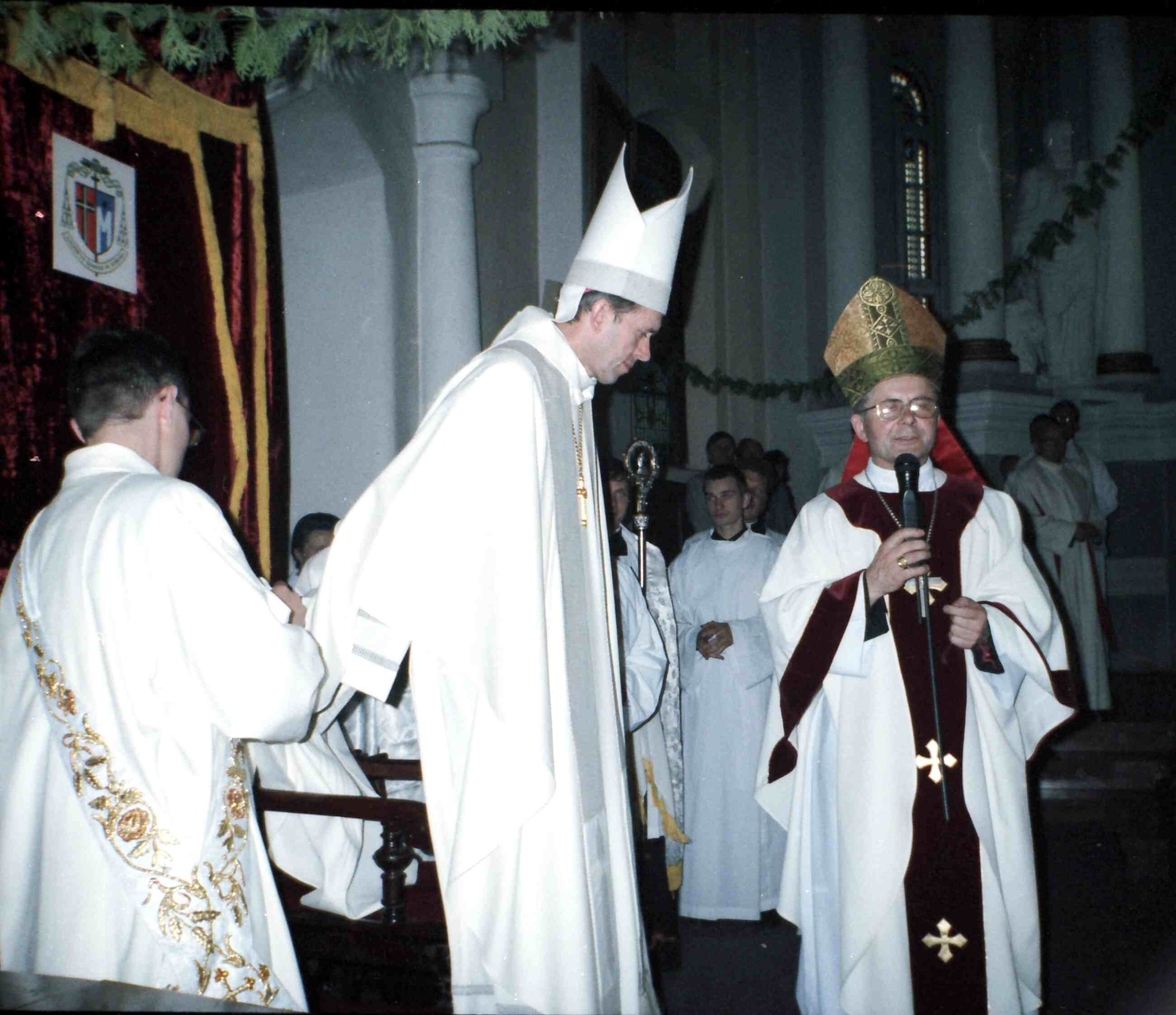
Bishop Eugenijus Bartulis being seated into the throne of the Bishop of Šiauliai in 1997. Tamkevičius participated in the ceremony as an Archbishop of Kaunas and is holding the microphone.

He graduated from secondary school in Seirijai in 1955 and entered the Kaunas Priest Seminary. He spent several years in the military service in the Soviet Army and then continued his theology studies, graduating from the seminary in 1962. He was ordained priest by Bishop Petras Maželis on 18 April 1962. He ministered as vicar in the parishes of Alytus, Lazdijai, Kudirkos Naumiestis, Prienai, Simnas. In 1968 he entered the Society of Jesus, which was then illegal under Soviet law. Tamkevičius was among the initiators of the petition action protesting the Soviet discriminating restrictions on the Kaunas Seminary. Because of that Soviet authorities forbade Tamkevičius from exercising his ministry. He worked in a factory and in the land-reclamation area for one year.

While vicar in Simnas parish, Tamkevičius initiated the underground publication of the Chronicle of the Catholic Church of Lithuania in 1972. The Chronicle registered and made public in the West the facts of religious discrimination in Soviet Lithuania. The underground publications were persecuted by KGB. Tamkevičius was the pastor of Kybartai parish from 1975 until 1983. At the same time he was the editor of The Chronicle for 11 years until his arrest in 1983. Tamkevičius together with four other Lithuanian priests founded the Catholic Committee for Defense of the Believers’ Rights in 1978. Tamkevičius was arrested and put under trial, being accused for alleged anti-Soviet propaganda and agitation in 1983. He was sentenced with ten years term of the prison and exile. Tamkevičius spent his prison term in the labor camps of Perm and Mordovia. He was exiled to Tomsk Oblast in 1988. With the liberalization of Soviet politics under perestroika, he was released in 1988.

The Lithuanian Bishops' Conference appointed Tamkevičius spiritual director of the Kaunas Seminary in 1989. He was appointed rector of the Seminary in 1990. Tamkevičius was appointed auxiliary bishop of Kaunas on 8 May 1991 and was consecrated a bishop on 19 May 1991. Pope John Paul II appointed him Archbishop of Kaunas on 4 May 1996. Within the Lithuanian Episcopal Conference, he has been President (1999–2002, 2005–2008, and 2008–2014) and Vice-President (2002–2005).

Pope Francis accepted his resignation on 11 June 2015.

On 5 October 2019, Pope Francis made him Cardinal Priest of Sant'Angela Merici.

== See also ==
- Cardinals created by Francis
- Catholic Church in Lithuania

Catholic Church titles
Titular see established	Titular Bishop of Turuda; 8 May 1991 – 4 May 1996	Succeeded by Eugenio Romero Pose
Preceded by Juozas Preikšas	Auxiliary Bishop of Kaunas; 8 May 1991 – 4 May 1996	Succeeded by Rimantas Norvila
Preceded by Vincentas Sladkevičius	Archbishop of Kaunas; 4 May 1996 – 11 June 2015	Succeeded by Lionginas Virbalas
Preceded by Audrys Juozas Bačkis	President of the Lithuanian Episcopal Conference; 3 November 1999 – 20 September 2002	Succeeded by Audrys Juozas Bačkis
Preceded by Audrys Juozas Bačkis	Vice-President of the Lithuanian Episcopal Conference; 20 September 2002 – 20 September 2005	Succeeded by Audrys Juozas Bačkis
Preceded by Audrys Juozas Bačkis	President of the Lithuanian Episcopal Conference; 20 September 2005 – 28 October 2014	Succeeded by Gintaras Linas Grušas
Preceded by Fernando Sebastián Aguilar	Cardinal-Priest of Sant'Angela Merici; 5 October 2019 –	Incumbent
