= Rimantas Norvila =

Lithuanian Roman Catholic priest (1957)

- Bishop of Vilkaviškis
- Church: Catholic Church
- Diocese: Diocese of Vilkaviškis
- Appointed: 5 January 2002
- Predecessor: Juozas Žemaitis
- Previous posts: Titular Bishop of Castrum (1997-2002); Auxiliary Bishop of Kaunas (1997-2002)

Orders
- Ordination: 24 February 1991
- Consecration: 29 June 1997 by Sigitas Tamkevičius

Personal details
- Born: 2 December 1957 (age 68) Babtai, Kaunas District Municipality, Lithuanian SSR, Soviet Union

Rimantas Norvila (born 2 December 1957) is a Lithuanian Roman Catholic priest, bishop of the Roman Catholic Diocese of Vilkaviškis since 2002.

He was ordained priest in 1991.
