= Fernando Sebastián Aguilar =

Spanish cardinal (1929–2019)

His Eminence Fernando Sebastián Aguilar C.M.F.
- Cardinal; Archbishop Emeritus of Pamplona y Tudela
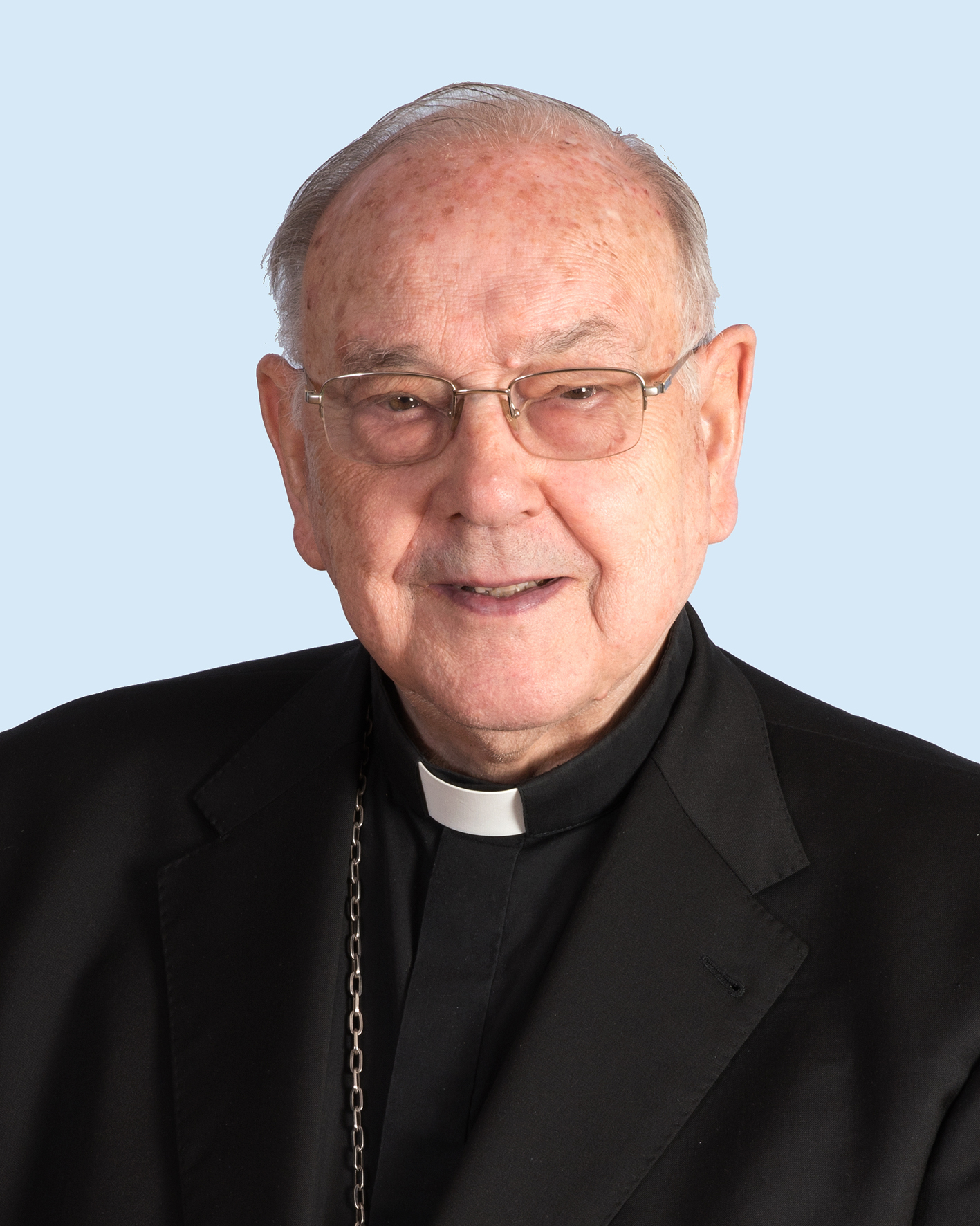
- Church: Roman Catholic Church
- Archdiocese: Pamplona y Tudela
- See: Pamplona y Tudela
- Appointed: 26 March 1993
- Installed: 15 May 1993
- Term ended: 31 July 2007
- Predecessor: José María Cirarda Lachiondo
- Successor: Francisco Pérez González
- Other post: Cardinal-Priest of Sant'Angela Merici (2014-19)
- Previous posts: Bishop of León (1979–1983); Secretary General of the Spanish Episcopal Conference (1982-88); Coadjutor Archbishop of Granada (1988–93); Apostolic Administrator of Málaga (1991-93); Vice-President of the Spanish Episcopal Conference (1993-99; 2002-05); Apostolic Administrator of Calahorra y La Calzada-Logroño (2003-04)

Orders
- Ordination: 28 June 1953 by Benjamín de Arriba y Castro
- Consecration: 29 September 1979 by Vicente Enrique y Tarancón
- Created cardinal: 22 February 2014 by Pope Francis
- Rank: Cardinal-Priest

Personal details
- Born: 14 December 1929 Calatayud, Spain
- Died: 24 January 2019 (aged 89) Málaga, Spain
- Education: Pontifical University of Saint Thomas Aquinas; Institut Catholique de Paris; Université catholique de Louvain
- Motto: Veritas in Caritate (Truth in Love)
- Coat of arms: Fernando Sebastián Aguilar's coat of arms

Styles of Fernando Sebastián Aguilar, CMF
- Reference style: His Eminence
- Spoken style: Your Eminence
- Religious style: Cardinal
- Informal style: Cardinal

Ordination history of Fernando Sebastián Aguilar
History
Priestly ordination
- Ordained by: Benjamín de Arriba y Castro
Episcopal consecration
- Principal consecrator: Vicente Enrique y Tarancón
- Co-consecrators: Gabino Díaz Merchán; José Delicado Baeza
Cardinalate
- Elevated by: Pope Francis
Episcopal succession
Bishops consecrated by Fernando Sebastián Aguilar as principal consecrator
- Aquilino Bocos Merino C.M.F.: 16 June 2018

Fernando Sebastián Aguilar CMF (Spanish pronunciation: [feɾˈnando seβasˈtjan aɣiˈlaɾ]; 14 December 1929 – 24 January 2019) was a Spanish cardinal of the Roman Catholic Church and the Archbishop Emeritus of Pamplona y Tudela. Pope Francis elevated him to the rank of cardinal in a consistory on February 22, 2014.

== Biography and Education ==
Sebastián Aguilar was born in Calatayud, Province of Zaragoza on 14 December 1929.

He entered the Congregation of the Missionary Sons of the Immaculate Heart of Mary (Claretians) and made his religious profession on 8 September 1946. After completing his studies in philosophy and theology in the seminaries of the congregation, he was ordained a priest on 28 June 1953. Sebastián Aguilar obtained a doctorate in Sacred Theology from the Pontifical University of St. Thomas Aquinas, Angelicum in 1957 with a dissertation entitled “Maternitatis divinae diversa ratio apud Didacum Alvarez et Franciscum Suarez”.

He became a member of the Sociedad Mariológica Española in 1959 and served as director of the Revista Ephemerides Mariologicae in 1966. In the same year, he founded the Iglesia Viva journal, which he directed until 1971. Sebastián Aguilar also taught dogmatic theology in his religious congregation in Valls and Salamanca. He then served as professor, from 1967, and subsequently rector, from 1971 to 1979, of the Pontifical University of Salamanca.

== Episcopate ==
Sebastián Aguilar was the archbishop emeritus of Pamplona y Tudela, having served as archbishop from 26 March 1993 until 31 July 2007, when he was succeeded by Francisco Pérez González. Prior to this, he was Bishop of León from 22 August 1979 until 28 July 1983, when he stepped down. He became archbishop co-adjutor of Granada on 8 April 1988, but did not succeed to that see because he was appointed to the aforementioned Pamplona y Tudela.

== Cardinal ==
Pope Francis announced on 12 January 2014 that on 22 February, Archbishop Sebastián Aguilar, along with 18 other individuals, would be inducted into the College of Cardinals.

== Death ==
Sebastián Aguilar died on 24 January 2019 in Málaga at the age of 89 after having suffered a severe stroke just a few days prior on 20 January.

== See also ==
- Cardinals created by Francis

Catholic Church titles
Preceded by Luis María de Larrea y Legarreta, OFM	Bishop of León; 1979-1983	Succeeded by Juan Ángel Belda Dardiñá
Preceded by José María Cirarda Lachiondo	Archbishop of Pamplona y Tudela; 1983- 2007	Succeeded by Francisco Pérez González
Preceded by titular church established	Cardinal Priest of Sant’Angela Merici; 2014–2019	Succeeded by Sigitas Tamkevičius
