= Roman Catholic Diocese of Vilkaviškis =

Roman Catholic diocese in Lithuania

Coordinates: 54°39′N 23°2′E

Diocese of Vilkaviškis Dioecesis Vilkaviskensis Vilkaviškio vyskupija
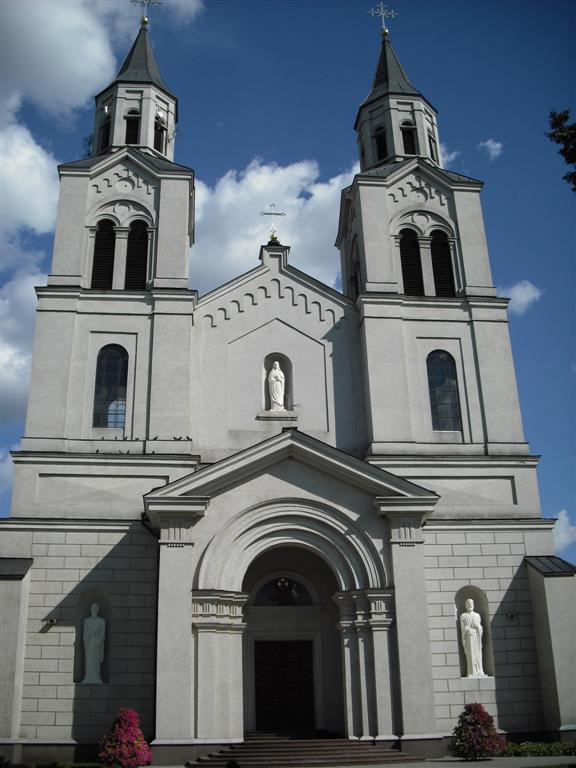
- Vilkaviškis Cathedral

Location
- Country: Lithuania
- Ecclesiastical province: Kaunas
- Metropolitan: Kaunas

Statistics
- Population: Total; Catholics: (as of 2014); 339,241; 331,154 (97.6%)

Information
- Sui iuris church: Latin Church
- Rite: Latin Rite
- Cathedral: Vilkaviškis Cathedral
- Patron saint: Anthony of Padua

Current leadership
- Pope: Leo XIV
- Bishop: Rimantas Norvila
- Metropolitan Archbishop: Kęstutis Kėvalas

Map
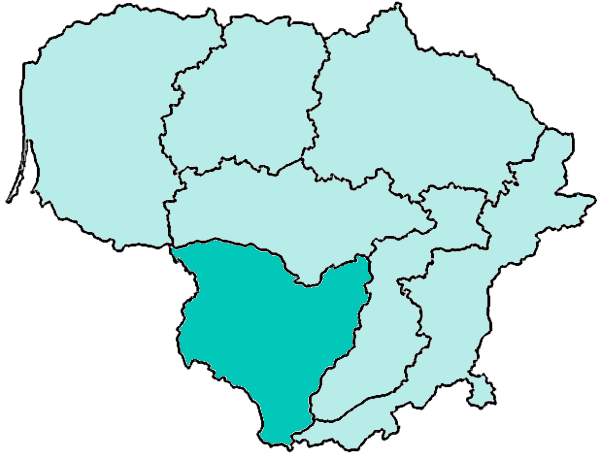
- Location of Diocese of Vilkaviškis in Lithuania

Website
- Website of the Diocese

The Roman Catholic Diocese of Vilkaviškis (Latin: Vilkavisken(sis)) is a diocese located in the city of Vilkaviškis in the ecclesiastical province of Kaunas in Lithuania. It was established on 4 April 1926 from the Diocese of Sejny, which Pope Pius XII controversially split into two along the new countries' post-World War I border, the other being the Diocese of Łomża, Poland.

== Special churches ==
- Šv. arkangelo Mykolo bazilika (Basilica of St. Michael the Archangel), Marijampolė.

== Leadership ==
- Bishop Antanas Karosas (1926.04.05 – 1947.07.07)
- Archbishop Liudas Povilonis, M.I.C. (Apostolic Administrator 1979.05.28 – 1988.04.27)
- Bishop Juozas Žemaitis, M.I.C. (Apostolic Administrator 1988.04.27 – 1991.12.24)
- Bishop Juozas Žemaitis, M.I.C. (1991.12.24 – 2002.01.05)
- Bishop Rimantas Norvila (2002.01.05 – present)
