= Sant'Angela Merici =

- Saint Angela Merici (in English); Sancti Angelæ Merici (in Latin)
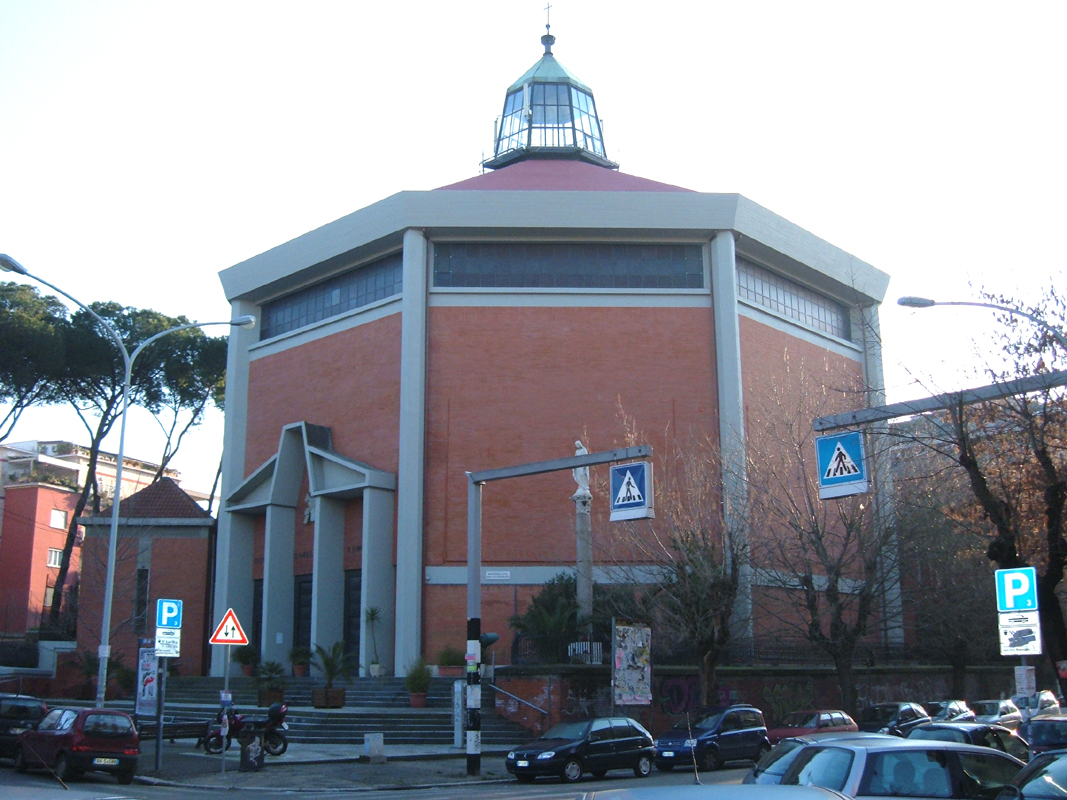
- Facade
- Click on the map for a fullscreen view
- 41°55′24″N 12°31′31″E
- Location: Via di Sant'Angela Merici 57, Rome
- Country: Italy
- Denomination: Roman Catholic
- Tradition: Roman Rite

History
- Status: Titular church
- Dedication: Angela Merici
- Consecrated: 1967

Architecture
- Architect(s): Aldo Aloysi and Ernesto Vichi
- Architectural type: Church
- Style: Modernist
- Groundbreaking: 1955
- Completed: 1967

Administration
- District: Lazio
- Province: Rome

The St. Angela Merici Church is a church in Rome, in the quartiere Nomentano, in Via Bartolomeo Marliano.

== History ==
Made in 1955 by Eng. Ernesto Vichi, it was erected as a parish on 25 September 1963 by decree of the Cardinal Vicar Clemente Micara, and entrusted in 1958 to the Oblates of the Virgin Mary. The church was consecrated in 1967 and was visited by Pope John Paul II on 27 May 2001. In 2014, it is home to the cardinal's title of "St. Angela Merici". Fernando Sebastián Aguilar was the first cardinal-protector.

== Description ==
The church is a tall octagonal red brick building and ribbed concrete. On top of the church there is a lantern, while below the cornice runs a long glass. The main entrance is preceded by a short flight of steps, and is surmounted by the coat of arms of Pope Paul VI and the dedicatory inscription: D.O.M. in hon. S. Angelae Merici A.D. MCMLXVII. The interior of the church is in simple shapes, with one side chapel, where there are a ceramic crucifix and two paintings depicting a Deposition and a Eucharist.

== Cardinal-Protector ==
Pope Francis established it as titular church of "Sant'Angela Merici".

- Fernando Sebastián Aguilar, CMF (22 February 2014 – 24 January 2019)
- Sigitas Tamkevičius (5 October 2019 – present)
