= Juozas Preikšas =

Lithuanian Roman Catholic bishop

Juozas Preikšas (22 November 1926 – 11 February 2018) was a Catholic bishop.

Preikšas was ordained to the priesthood. He served as auxiliary bishop of the Catholic Archdiocese of Kaunas, Lithuania. He then served as bishop of the Diocese of Panevėžys from 1991 to 2002.
