= Spirito Santo alla Ferratella =

- Church of the Holy Spirit on the Ferratella
- Chiesa dello Spirito Santo alla Ferratella
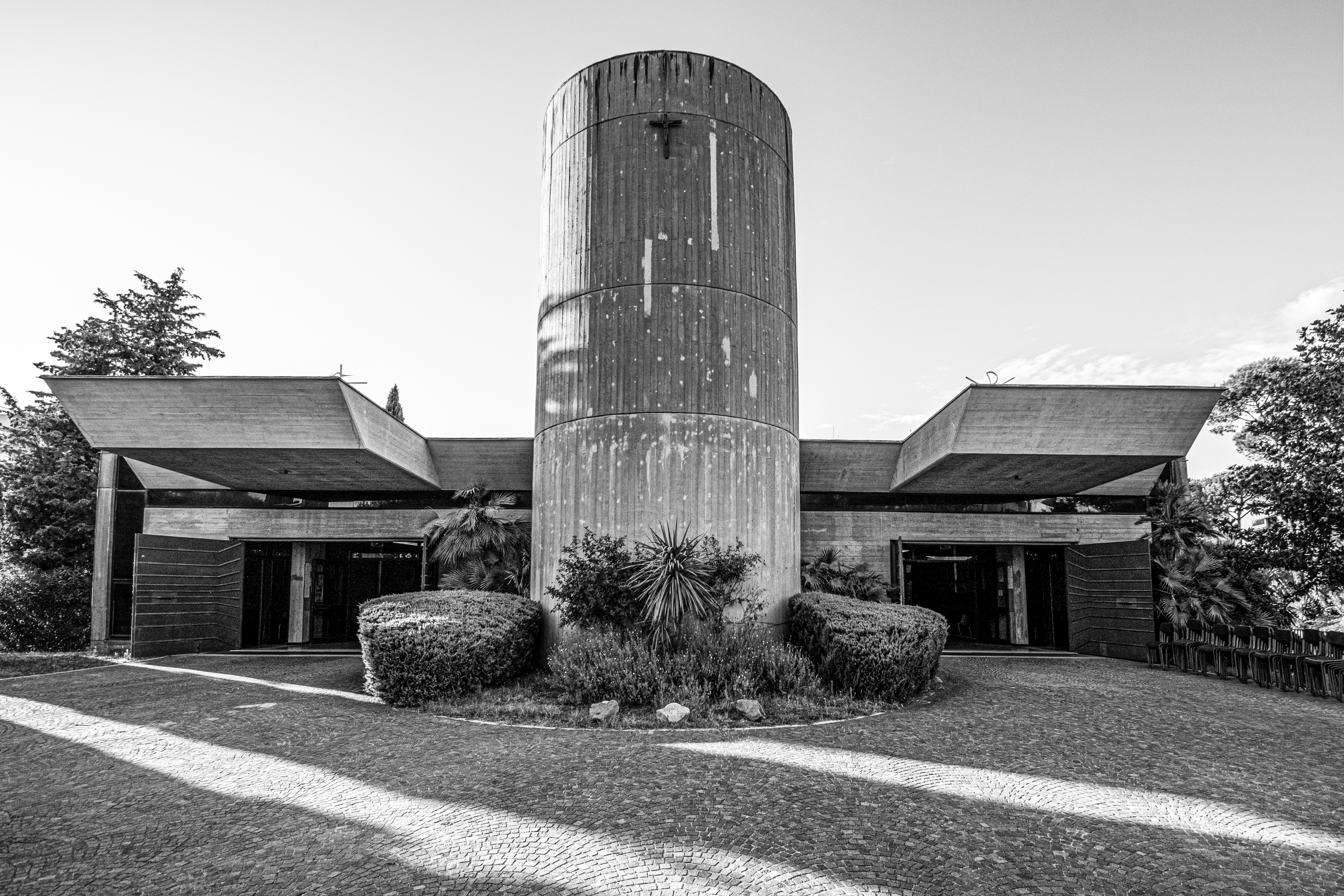
- Click on the map for a fullscreen view
- 41°49′04″N 12°28′25″E
- Location: Via Rocco Scotellaro 11, Rome
- Country: Italy
- Language: Italian
- Denomination: Catholic Church
- Tradition: Roman Rite
- Religious order: Rosminians

History
- Status: titular church
- Founded: 1981
- Dedication: Holy Spirit

Architecture
- Architect: Ignazio Breccia Fratadocchi
- Architectural type: Modern

Administration
- Diocese: Rome

Spirito Santo alla Ferratella is a titular church for a cardinal-priest and parish church in Rome, dedicated to the Holy Spirit.

== Church ==
Located at Via Rocco Scotellaro 11, Roma, Roma, Lazio 00144 (near Viale Cesare Pavese), in the southern prefecture, in the Pope's own Diocese of Rome.

It was built for a Holy Spirit parish founded on 1 December 1981, which is pastorally served by the Rosminians.

Pope John Paul II visited the church on 16 April 1989.

On 28 June 1988, it was established as titular church for a cardinal of the rank of Cardinal-Priest.

List

- Vincentas Sladkevičius, M.I.C. (28 June 1988 – 28 May 2000)
- Ivan Dias (21 February 2001 – 19 June 2017)
- Ignatius Suharyo Hardjoatmodjo (5 October 2019 – present)
