= Kaunas Priest Seminary =

Catholic seminary in Lithuania

Coordinates: 54.897°N 23.884°E

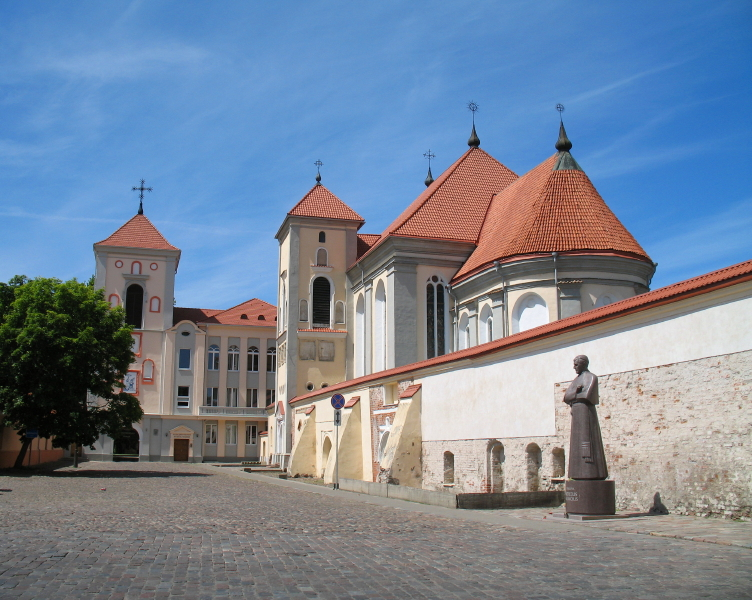
Church of Holy Trinity in Kaunas is a part of the seminary. A monument to Motiejus Valančius is visible near the seminary wall.

Kaunas Priest Seminary (Lithuanian: Kauno kunigų seminarija) is the largest seminary in Lithuania serving the Roman Catholic Archdiocese of Kaunas. It is part of the Faculty of Theology of Vytautas Magnus University. Its current rector is Aurelijus Žukauskas. As of 2007, the seminary had 35 students. It traces its history to 1622.

== History ==
The Diocese of Samogitia did not have its own school for priests. Therefore, Bishops of Samogitia sponsored students at the Jesuit Academy in Vilnius, which was established in 1570. In 1622, Bishop Stanisław Kiszka decided to sponsor a separate seminary in Varniai, the seat of the diocese. In 1628, the seminary moved to Kražiai where it shared premises with the Jesuit Kražiai College until 1745. Bishop Antanas Domininkas Tiškevičius decided to move the seminary back to Varniai. There he built a brick house dedicated to the seminary's needs. From 1850 to 1862, 333 men were ordained as priests. In 1862, the seminary had 120 students.

After the January Uprising of 1863, the seat of Bishop Motiejus Valančius was moved from Varniai to Kaunas on December 3, 1864. The Seminary was offered the monastery of Cistercians and St. George Church in Kaunas. From 1863 to 1870 the seminary's capacity was limited, since officials of the Russian Empire did not permit new enrollments.

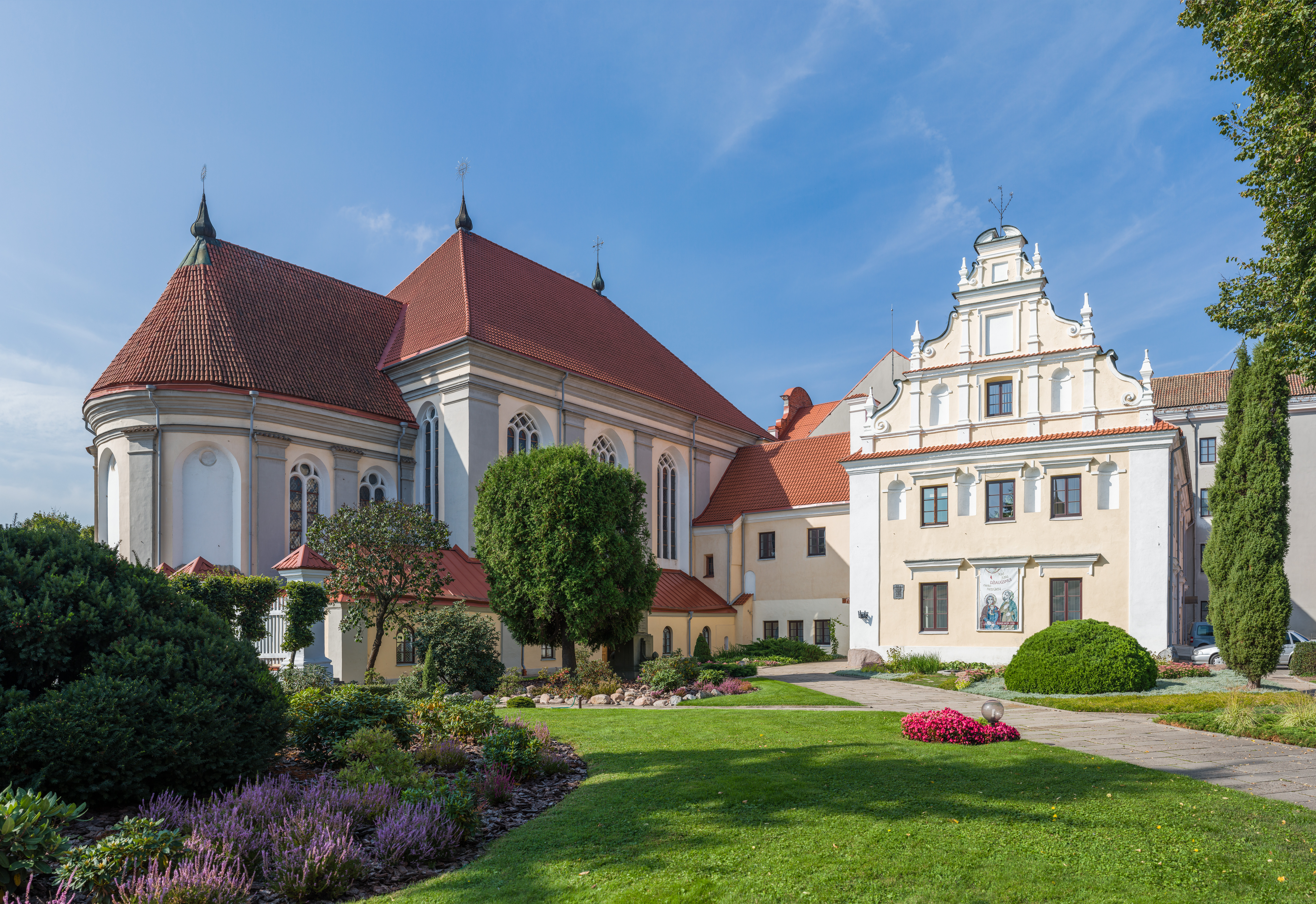
Kaunas Priest Seminary

The Kaunas Priest Seminary was one of the centers of the Lithuanian National Revival during the Russification era. Antanas Baranauskas taught there for some time, initiating lectures using the Lithuanian language. Many of its students were active in Lithuanian book smuggling. In 1884 its students began printing Lietuva, a Lithuanian-language newspaper, edited by Adomas Jakštas. Fearing persecution by the Tsarist authorities, seminary leaders closed the newspaper. In 1888 a secret Lithuanian society was established, which was transformed into the St. Casimir Society in 1889. In 1892 Maironis was appointed a professor there and this move had a major impact on usage of the Lithuanian language. After Maironis left for St. Petersburg, Adomas Dambrauskas-Jakštas was appointed as the chaplain and continued Maironis' work. In 1909 Maironis was appointed as the rector of the seminary. At that time the seminary was completely Lithuanian.

During World War I, the seminary moved to Vašuokėnai estate near Troškūnai and the building in Kaunas was converted to a military hospital. Between 1926 and 1940, 3,078 students graduated from the Seminary. After Lithuania was occupied by the Soviet Union, all other priest seminaries in Lithuania were closed. The number of students was at first limited to 150; the limit gradually decreased to 25. Most of the seminary buildings were confiscated; the Church of the Holy Trinity was turned into a warehouse; a library containing some 90,000 volumes was destroyed; and many priests were deported to Siberia. Between 1945 and 1981, 428 priests graduated. After Lithuania declared independence in 1990, the seminary reacquired its former buildings, which were restored before the visit of Pope John Paul II in 1993.

== Studies ==
The seminary's current program consists of five years of undergraduate studies beginning with preparatory courses in Šiluva. Its graduates receive a degree from the Vytautas Magnus University, where they may pursue graduate and post-graduate studies. Its curriculum aims to develop students' spirituality, humanism, and intellectual abilities, and prepare them for pastoral duties.

== Rectors ==
The seminary's rectors were:

- 1864–1884 – Jeronimas Kiprijonas Račkauskas
- 1888–1899 – Gasparas Feliksas Cirtautas
- 1900–1907 – Antanas Karosas
- 1909–1932 – Jonas Mačiulis-Maironis
- 1932–1940 – Pranas Penkauskas
- 1940–1941 – Vincentas Brizgys
- 1942–1945 – Pranas Petraitis
- 1945–1946 – Stasys Gruodis
- 1946–1947 – Pranciškus Venckus
- 1947–1950 – Augustinas Vaitiekaitis
- 1950–1952 – Albinas Jaudegis
- 1952–1953 – Kazimieras Sirūnas
- 1953–1959 – Kazimieras Žitkus
- 1959–1962 – Alfonsas Lapė
- 1962–1989 – Viktoras Butkus
- 1989–1990 – Vladas Michelevičius
- 1990–1991 – Sigitas Tamkevičius
- 1991–1993 – Algis Baniulis
- 1993–1996 – Pranciškus Tamulevičius
- 1996–1997 – Eugenijus Bartulis
- 1997–2001 – Rimantas Norvila
- 2001–2018 – Aurelijus Žukauskas
- 2018–2023 – Ramūnas Norkus
- 2023 – Liutauras Vilėniškis
