= Roman Catholic Archdiocese of Kaunas =

Latin Catholic archdiocese in Lithuania

Coordinates: 54°54′N 23°53′E

Metropolitan Archdiocese of Kaunas Archidioecesis Metropolitae Kaunensis Kauno Arkivyskupija Metropolitas
- Kaunas Archcathedral Basilica, the mother church of the Archdiocese

Location
- Country: Lithuania

Statistics
- Area: 8,750 km^{2} (3,380 sq mi)
- Population: Total; Catholics: (as of 2016); 655,000; 524,000 (80%)

Information
- Denomination: Catholic
- Sui iuris church: Latin Church
- Rite: Roman Rite
- Established: 1417 (As Diocese of Žemaičiai); 4 April 1926 (As Archdiocese of Kaunas)
- Cathedral: Cathedral Basilica of St Peter and St Paul
- Patron saint: John the Baptist

Current leadership
- Pope: Leo XIV
- Metropolitan Archbishop: Kęstutis Kėvalas
- Suffragans: Diocese of Šiauliai, Diocese of Telšiai, Diocese of Vilkaviškis
- Auxiliary Bishops: Saulius Bužauskas
- Bishops emeritus: Sigitas Tamkevičius; Lionginas Virbalas

Map
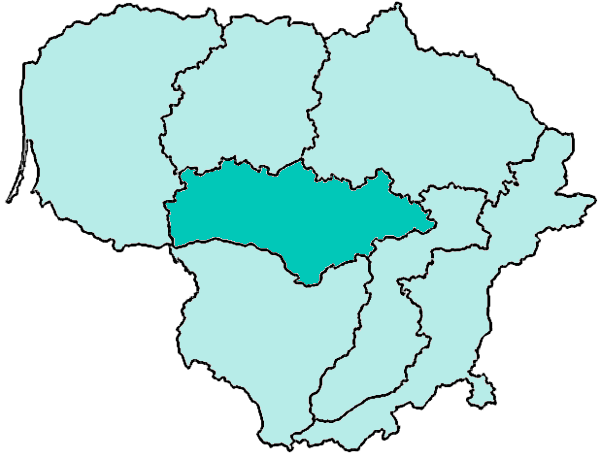
- Map of the Archdiocese

Website
- Website of the Diocese

The Metropolitan Archdiocese of Kaunas (Latin: Archidioecesis Metropolitae Kaunensis) is a Latin Church ecclesiastical territory or archdiocese of the Catholic Church in Lithuania. The episcopal see is in Kaunas, the second-largest city in Lithuania. The archdiocese's motherchurch and cathedral is Kaunas Cathedral Basilica; it is also home to a Minor Basilica in a town of Šiluva, in the region of Samogitia.

== History ==
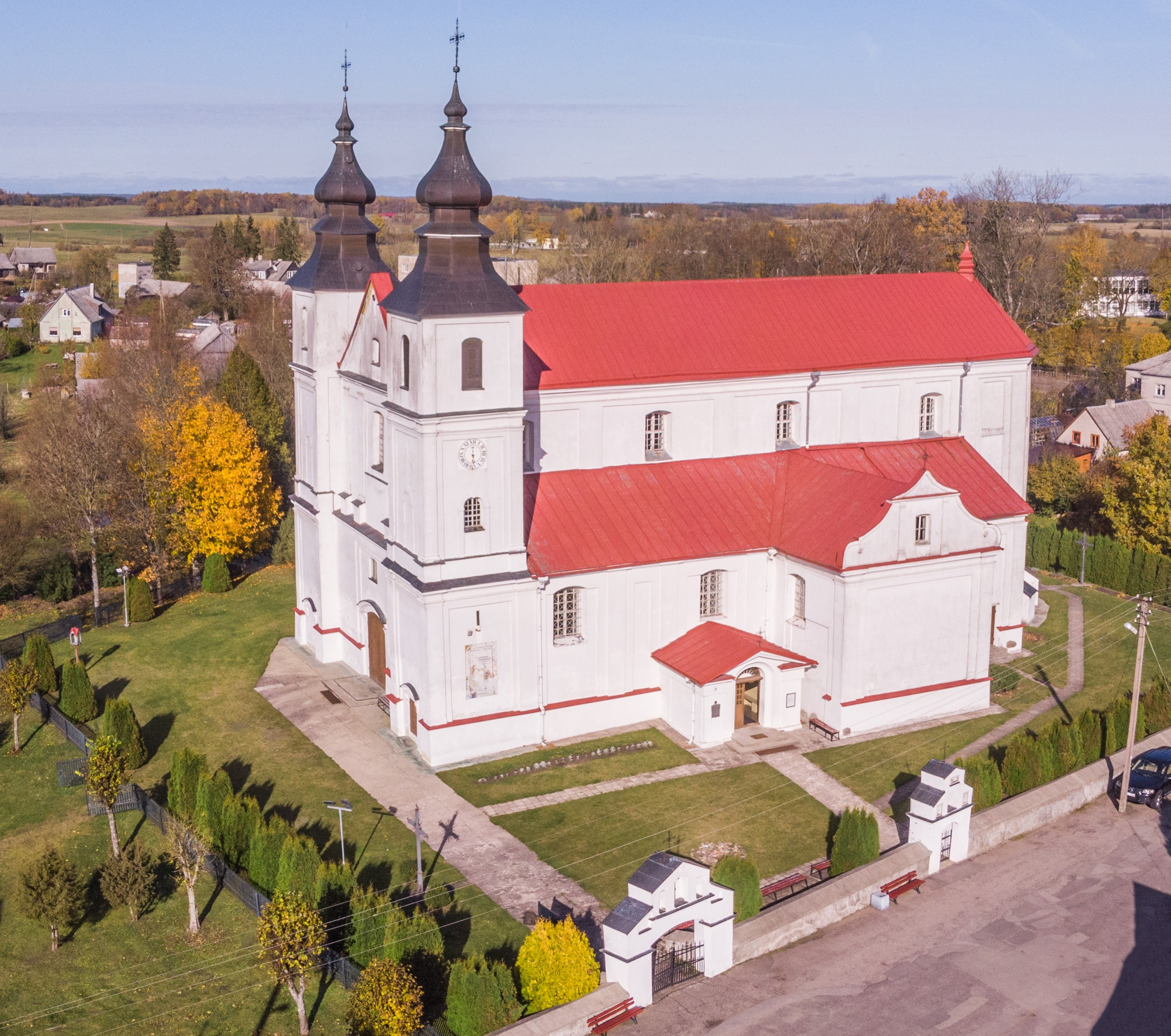
Church of St. Peter and St. Paul, Varniai, cathedral of the Diocese of Samogitia until 1864

Predecessor of the diocese was established according to directions from the Council of Constance on October 24, 1417, as the Diocese of Samogitia, with a see in Medininkai as a suffragan Diocese of the Archdiocese of Gniezno. It was the second Catholic diocese in ethnic Lithuanian parts of the Grand Duchy of Lithuania.

On March 25, 1798, it lost territory to establish the Diocese of Wigry and became a suffragan see of the Archdiocese of Mohilev (until 1926). On July 3, 1848, it gained territory from the persisting then Diocese of Vilnius, now Lithuania's other Metropolitan see. On June 9, 1920, it lost territory to the existing Diocese of Riga (in Latvia), while in the next year it gained territory from the persisting Diocese of Sejny (in Poland).

Curia of the Archdiocese of Kaunas

The Apostolic constitution, issued by Pius XI, intended to structure the diocesan territories in accordance with the actual boundaries of Lithuanian Republic after the Declaration of Independence in 1918. Due to fact, that claimed Lithuanian capital city Vilnius and the eastern parts of the country were seized by Polish troops in 1920 and annexed by Poland in 1922, Kaunas became not only the Temporary capital of Lithuania but also was promoted by Pope Pius XI on April 4, 1926, into the Metropolitan Archdiocese of Kaunas, initially with as suffragan sees Vilkaviškis and Telšiai in the new Lithuanian ecclesiastical province. The then Diocese of Vilnius was also elevated into a Metropolitan Archbishopric with its ecclesiastical province in Polish territory.

It enjoyed a Papal Visit from Pope John Paul II in September 1993. On May 28, 1997, parts of the archdiocese have been ceded to the newly founded suffragan Diocese of Šiauliai.

== Province ==
Its ecclesiastical province comprises the Metropolitan's own archbishopric and the following suffragan sees :

- Diocese of Šiauliai
- Diocese of Telšiai
- Diocese of Vilkaviškis

== Episcopal ordinaries ==
Suffragan Bishops of Samogitia
See List of bishops of Samogitia.

- Matthias di Trakai (1417.10.23 – 1422.05.04), later Bishop of Vilnius (1422.05.04 – death 1453.05.09)
- Mikalojus Trakiškis (1423.08.06 – death 1434.03)
- Petras da Leopoli (1434.09.20 – death 1435.09)
- Jokūbas Vilnietis (1436.05.18 – death 1439.06.08)
- Baltramiejus Pultuskietis (1440 – death 1453.10.26)
- Jurgis Vilnietis (1453.12.19 – death 1464.02.25)
- Motiejus Topolietis (1464.08.08 – death 1470.04.24)
- Baltramiejus Svirenkavičius (1471.02.13 – death 1482)
- Martynas di Samogizia (1483.02.21 – death 1492)
- Martynas Lintfaras (Marcin Lintfari) (1492.10.08 – death 1515)
- Mikalojus Radvila (Mikołaj III Radziwiłł) (1521.07.18 – death 1530.11.03)
- Mikalojus Vizgaila (Mikołaj Wieżgajło) (1531.02.15 – death 1533.01.19)
- Vaclovas Virbickis (Wacław Wierzbicki) (1534.04.13 – death 1555.07.18)
- Jonas Domanovskis (Jan Domanowski) (1556.04.13 – death 1563.11)
- Stanislovas Narkuskis (Stanisław Narkuski) (1564.06.21 – death 1564.09)
- Viktorinas Virbickis (Wiktoryn Wierzbicki) (1565.06.08 – 1567.08.22), later Bishop of Łuck and Włodzimierz (Poland) (1567.08.22 – 1586)
- Jurgis Petkūnas Petkevičius (Jerzy Pietkiewicz) (1567.11.14 – death 1574.07)
- Merkelis Giedraitis (Melchior Giedroyć) (1576.01.16 – death 1609.04.06)
- Mikalojus Pacas (Mikołaj Pac) (1610.03.29 – retired 1618.11.26), previously Auxiliary Bishop of Vilnius & Titular Bishop of Modon (1602.09.09 – 1610.03.29)
- Stanislovas Kiška (Stanisław Kiszka) (1618.11.26 – death 1626.02.13)
- Abraomas Voina (Abraham Woyna) (1626.07.20 – 1631.03.24), previously Titular Bishop of Modon (1611.05.25 – 1626.07.20) & Auxiliary Bishop of Vilnius (Lithuania) (1611.05.25 – 1626.07.20); later Bishop of Vilnius (1631.03.24 – death 1649.04.14)
- Merkelis Elijaševičius Geišas (Melchior Elijaszewicz Geisz) (1631.06.11 – death 1633.01.28)
- Jurgis Tiškevičius (Jerzy Tyszkiewicz) (1633.12.19 – 1649.12.09), previously Titular Bishop of Modon (1627.05.17 – 1633.12.19) & Auxiliary Bishop of Vilnius (1627.05.17 – 1633.12.19); later Bishop of Vilnius (1649.12.09 – death 1656.01.17)
- Petras Parčevskis (Piotr Parczewski) (1649.12.09 – death 1658.12.06), previously Bishop of Smolensk (Lithuania) (1636.09.01 – 1649.12.09)
- Aleksandras Kazimieras Sapiega (Aleksander Kazimierz Sapieha) (1660.01.12 – 1667.07.18), previously Titular Bishop of Modon (1655.08.02 – 1660.01.12) & Auxiliary Bishop of Vilnius (Lithuania) (1655.08.02 – 1660.01.12); later Bishop of Vilnius (1667.07.18 – death 1671.05.22)
- Kazimieras Pacas (Kazimierz Pac) (1667.10.03 – death 1695), previously Bishop of Smolensk (Lithuania) (1664.01.14 – 1667.10.03)
- Jonas Jeronimas Krišpinas-Kiršenšteinas (Jan Hieronim Kryszpin-Kirszensztein) (1695.09.19 – death 1708.07.14), previously Titular Bishop of Martiria (1696.01.02 – 1706.01.25) & Auxiliary Bishop of Vilnius (1696.01.02 – 1710.07.21)
- Jonas Mikalojus Zgierskis (Jan Mikołaj Zgierski) (1710.07.21 – death 1713.12.06), previously Titular Bishop of Martiria (1696.01.02 – 1706.01.25) & Auxiliary Bishop of Vilnius (Lithuania) (1696.01.02 – 1710.07.21) and next Bishop of Smolensk (Russia) (1706.01.25 – 1710.07.21)
- Povilas Pranciškus Sapiega (Paweł Franciszek Sapieha), Cistercians (O. Cist.) (1715.01.21 – death 1715.10.01)
- Aleksandras Mikalojus Gorainis (Aleksander Mikołaj Horain) (1716.12.07 – death 1735.12.07), previously Titular Bishop of Tiberias (1704.09.15 – 1711.12.23) & Auxiliary Bishop of Vilnius (1704.09.15 – 1711.12.23), Bishop of Smolensk (Russia) (1711.12.23 – 1716.12.07)
- Juozapas Mykolas Karpis (Józef Michał Karp) (1736.11.19 – death 1739.12.10)
- Antanas Tiškevičius (Antoni Dominik Tyszkiewicz) (1740.09.16 – death 1762.01.31), previously Titular Bishop of Mennith (1739.07.20 – 1740.09.16) & Auxiliary Bishop of Kijów–Czernihów (Poland) (1739.07.20 – 1740.09.16)
- Dominykas Lopacinskis (Jan Dominik Łopaciński) (1762.04.19 – death 1778.01.11)
- Jan Stefan Giedroyć (1778.03.30 – retired 1802.05.13), previously Titular Bishop of Verinopolis (1763.08.22 – 1765.04.22) & Auxiliary Bishop of Vilnius (1763.08.22 – 1765.04.22), Bishop of Inflanty (Latvia) (1765.04.22 – 1778.03.30)

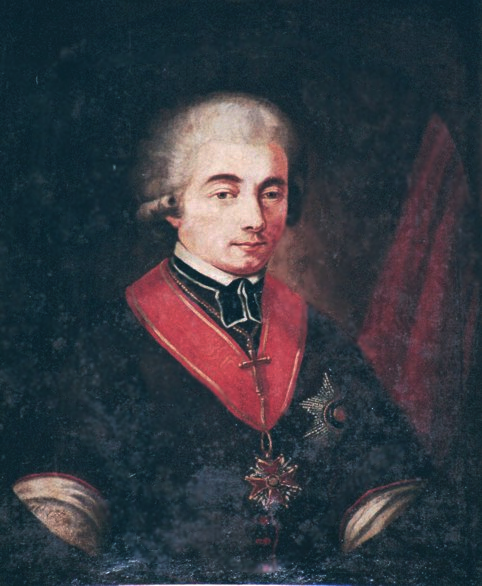
Juozapas Arnulfas Giedraitis, longest serving Bishop of Samogitia

- Juozapas Arnulfas Giedraitis (Józef Arnulf Giedroyć) (1802.05.13 – death 1838.07.17), succeeding as former Coadjutor Bishop of Samogitia ([1790.12.04] 1791.04.11 – 1802.05.13 & Titular Bishop of Orthosia (1791.04.11 – 1802.05.13)
- Apostolic Administrator Simonas Mikalojus Giedraitis (Szymon Michal Józef Arnold Giedroyć) (1838.07.17 – 1844.08.07), former Titular Bishop of Adramyttium (1804.08.20 – 1838.07.17), Auxiliary Bishop of Samogitia (1804.08.20 – 1829.12) and Coadjutor Bishop of Samogitia (1829.12 – 1838.07.17, not formally succeeding)
- Jonas Krizostomas Gintila (1844.08.07 – 1849.09.28 not possessed)
- Motiejus Valančius (Maciej Kazimierz Wołonczewski) (1849.09.28 – death 1875.05.29)
- Apostolic Administrator Aleksandras Kazimieras Beresnevičius (Aleksander Kazimierz Bereśniewicz) (1875.05.30 – 1883.03.15), Titular Bishop of Maximianopolis (1858.09.27 – 1883.03.15), former Auxiliary Bishop of Samogitia (1858.09.27 – 1875.05.30); later Bishop of Kujawy–Kalisz (Poland) (1883.03.15 – 1902.06.04)
- Mečislovas Leonardas Paliulionis (Mieczysław Leonard Pallulon) (1883.03.15 – death 1908.05.02)
- Gaspar Felicjan Cyrtowt (1910.04.07 – death 1913.09.20), previously Titular Bishop of Castoria (1897.07.21 – 1910.04.07) & Auxiliary Bishop of Samogitia (1897.07.21 – 1910.04.07)
- Pranciškus Karevičius, Marian Fathers (M.I.C.) (1914.02.27 – 1926.03.23), emeritate as Titular Archbishop of Scythopolis (1926.03.23 – 1945.05.30)

Metropolitan Archbishops of Kaunas

- Archbishop Juozapas Skvireckas (1926.04.05 – death 1959.12.03), previously Titular Bishop of Ceramus & Auxiliary Bishop of Kaunas (1919.03.10 – 1926.04.05)
- Soviet era semi-vacancy (1959–1989) : After Archbishop of Kaunas Juozapas Skvireckas left Kaunas with retreating German forces in 1944 into exile, the archdiocese was governed by the following capitular vicars and Apostolic administrators, who experienced continuous restrictions and persecutions of Soviet authorities :
  - ? Stanislovas Jokūbauskis (1944–1947)
  - ? Juozapas Stankevičius (1947–1965)
  - Juozapas Matulaitis-Labukas (Apostolic Administrator 1965.11.24 – 1979.05.28)
  - Liudvikas Povilonis (Apostolic Administrator 1979.05.28 – 1988.04.27)
  - Juozas Preikšas (Apostolic Administrator 1988.04.27 – 1989.03.10)
- Cardinal Vincentas Sladkevičius, Congregation of Marian Fathers (M.I.C.) (1989.03.10 – retired 1996.05.04), previously Titular Bishop of Abora (1957.11.14 – 1988.06.28), Auxiliary Bishop of Kaišiadorys (Lithuania) (1957.11.14 – 1982.07.15), Apostolic Administrator of Kaišiadorys (1982.07.15 – 1989.03.10); also President of Episcopal Conference of Lithuania (1988–1993); created Cardinal-Priest of Spirito Santo alla Ferratella (1988.06.28 – death 2000.05.28)

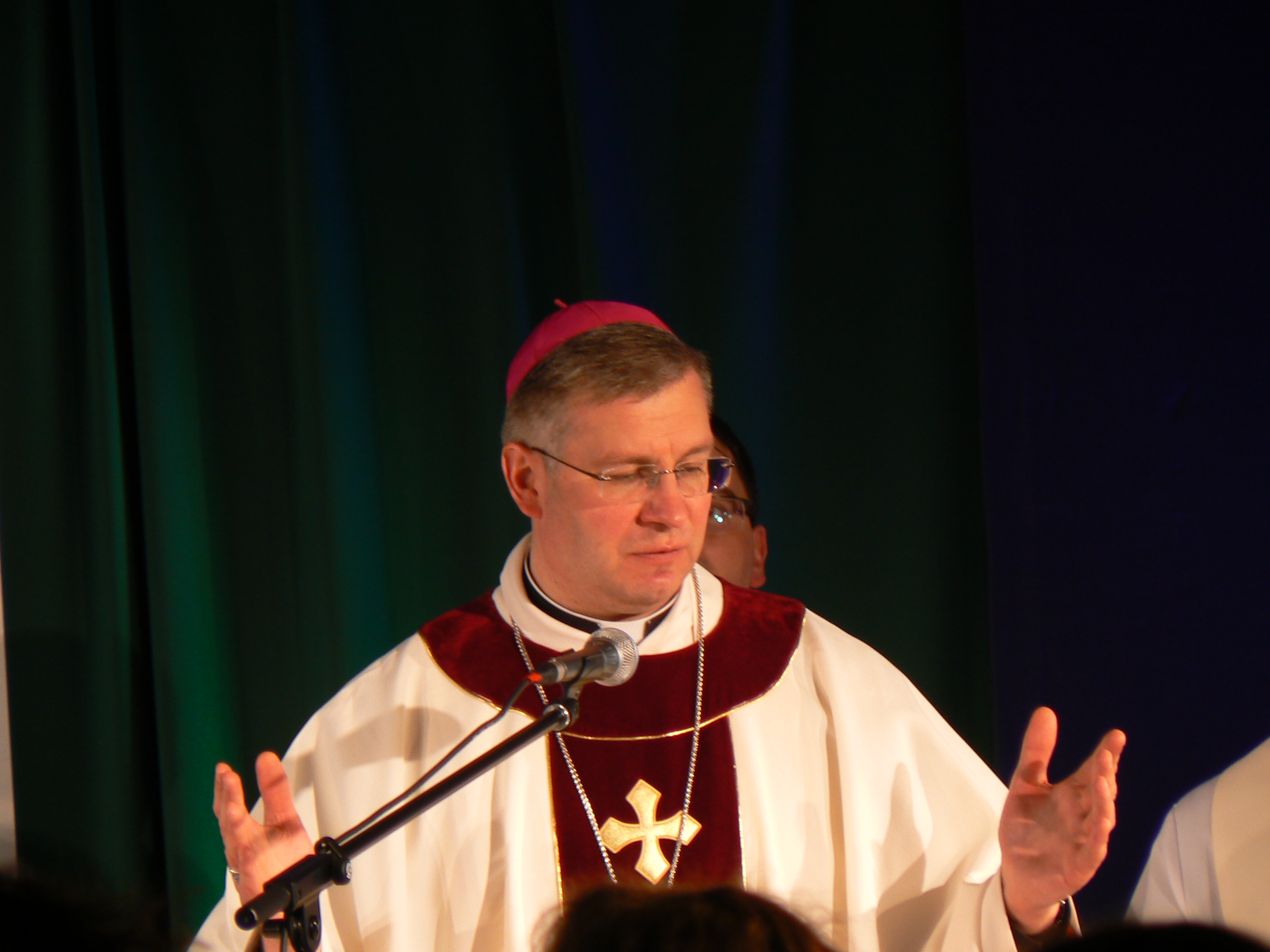
Kęstutis Kėvalas, Archbishop since 2020

- Archbishop Sigitas Tamkevičius, Society of Jesus (S.J.) (1996.05.04 – retired 2015.06.11), also President of Episcopal Conference of Lithuania (1999.11.03 – 2002.09.20), vice-president of Episcopal Conference of Lithuania (2002.09.20 – 2005.09.20), President of Episcopal Conference of Lithuania (2005.09.20 – 2014.10.28); previously Titular Bishop of Turuda & Auxiliary Bishop of Kaunas (1991.05.08 – 1996.05.04); as emeritus, became Cardinal-Priest of Sant'Angela Merici 10.05.2019
- Archbishop Lionginas Virbalas, S.J. (2015 – retired 2019.03.01), also vice-president of Episcopal Conference of Lithuania (2014.10.28 – 2015.06.11); previously Bishop of Panevėžys (2013.06.06 – 2015.06.11)
- Archbishop Kęstutis Kėvalas (2020.02.19 -), previously Bishop of Telšiai (-Klaipeda) (2017.09.18 - 2020.02.19)

== Source and External links ==
- GCatholic.org with incumbent biography links
