= Lithuanian Bishops' Conference =

Assembly of Catholic bishops

Lithuanian Bishops' Conference logo

Lithuanian Bishops' Conference (Lithuanian: Lietuvos vyskupų konferencija) is the official meeting of Catholic bishops in Lithuania. It has its seat in Vilnius. The Episcopal Conference is a member of the Council of European Episcopal Conferences (CCEE) and the Commission of the Bishops' Conferences of the European Community (COMECE).

== Task and basics ==
The main task lies in the joint discussion on pastoral issues, to develop proposals and to coordinate church activities. Members of the Lithuanian Bishops' Conference, all diocesan bishops, bishops and auxiliary bishops and other titled (e.g. titular) bishops of the Republic of Lithuania. Currently belong to her nine active bishops and three retired bishops. The highest body is the Assembly of the Lithuanian bishops, they elect the president and his representatives for a three-year period.

The social branch of the Lithuanian Bishops Conference is Caritas Lithuania.

== Bureau ==
President: Gintaras Grušas, Archbishop of Vilnius

Deputies: Lionginas Virbalas, Archbishop of Kaunas

== Structure ==
The Bishops' Conference works in the following structure: General Assembly, Permanent Council, Secretariat, commissions, and committees.

The annual General Assembly elects the Presidium and the Secretary-General to appoint commissions, committees and councils and appoints its chairman and members. It decides on matters of faith and discusses general issues of episcopal decrees and orders. It is empowered to proclaim official statements and is authorized to sign instructions.

The Permanent Council consists of the President and his deputy and the member elected Rimantas Norvila, Bishop of Vilkaviškis. The Council is elected every three years and prepare the questions and projects that will be addressed during the General Assembly and approved.

The Office of the Secretary General is currently carried out by Monsignor Kęstutis Smilgevičius; his side stands a staff of employees to coordinate the cooperation between the various bodies and institutions of the Episcopal Conference. The Secretariat will inform all members of the General Assembly on the decisions and changes. Simultaneously, the Secretariat is the connection point to other foreign bishops' conferences.

=== Commissions ===
The conference has following commissions:

- Commission for training and education
- Commission for Social Affairs
- Commission on Liturgy and Religious Communities
- Mass media

=== Committees ===
The Episcopal Conference may establish committees and appointed its head, this should be a bishop in the rule. Other experts and lay people might be appointed. The following committees are part of the conference:

- Committee on Ecumenism
- Committee on Family
- Committee for Youth Affairs
- Committee on the Laity
- Committee for Links with the Polish Bishops' Conference
- Committee on Social Affairs

== See also ==
- Roman Catholicism in Lithuania
