= Juozapas Matulaitis =

Lithuanian Roman Catholic bishop (1936–2026)

His Excellency Juozapas Matulaitis
- Bishop Emeritus of Kaišiadorys
- Archdiocese: Vilnius
- Diocese: Kaišiadorys
- Appointed: 24 December 1991
- Term ended: 11 February 2012
- Predecessor: Teofilius Matulionis
- Successor: Jonas Ivanauskas
- Previous posts: Apostolic Administrator of Kaišiadorys and Titular Bishop of Sicilibba (1989–1991)

Orders
- Ordination: 25 March 1964 by Petras Maželis
- Consecration: 18 March 1989 by Vincentas Sladkevičius, Julijonas Steponavičius, Juozas Preikšas and Vladas Michelevičius

Personal details
- Born: 8 March 1936 Užgirėlis, Lithuania
- Died: 8 November 2026 (aged 90) Kaišiadorys, Lithuania
- Education: Kaunas Priest Seminary
- Motto: Teatsinaujina Tėvynė Kristuje (May the Homeland be Renewed in Christ)

Juozapas Matulaitis (8 March 1936 – 8 November 2026) was a Lithuanian Roman Catholic bishop. He was the bishop of Kaišiadorys from 1991 to 2012.

Educated at the Kaunas Priest Seminary, Matulaitis was ordained as a priest in 1964. He then served as vicar, parson, or dean in various parishes of the Diocese of Kaišiadorys: Pivašiūnai (1964–66), Nemajūnai (1966–73), Vievis (1973–75), Butrimonys (1975–83), and Merkinė (1983–89). In all of these parishes, Matulaitis worked to repair the local church buildings.

In 1989, Matulaitis was consecrated as the Titular Bishop of Sicilibba and apostolic administrator of Kaišiadorys. He became the bishop of Kaišiadorys in 1991. He worked to repair Kaišiadorys Cathedral and establish community outreach centres – the Catechetical Centre in 1990, Family Center in 1996, and Youth Centre in 1999, and local chapter of Caritas Lithuania. He worked to commemorate his predecessors Teofilius Matulionis and Vincentas Sladkevičius. The case for the beatification of Matulionis was completed in 2008. The Park of the Mysteries of the Rosary was built at the birthplace of Sladkevičius.

== Biography ==
=== Early life and education ===
Juozapas Matulaitis was born on 8 March 1936 into a family of Lithuanian farmers in Užgirėlis in the present-day Kaišiadorys District Municipality. His parents supported the Lithuanian partisans and provided medical care to the local partisan leader Juozas Andrulevičius (codename Auksinukas) for more than a month.

Matutalitis attended a primary school in Užgirėlis, middle school in Kruonis and Žiežmariai. After graduation in 1955, he applied to Kaunas Priest Seminary but was rejected because Soviet authorities implemented a quota system. Therefore, he studied at the Kaunas Railway Technical School for two years. He was then admitted to the priest seminary, but after one semester was drafted into the Red Army. He served in Bălți, Moldova.

In 1960, he was readmitted to Kaunas Priest Seminary. He was ordained as a priest on 25 March 1964 by bishop Petras Maželis at Kaunas Cathedral.

=== Priesthood ===
In June 1960, Matulaitis was assigned as a vicar to Pivašiūnai. In April 1966, he was reassigned as parson to Nemajūnai. There he worked to repair the church and the clergy house. The repairs included new floors, two side altars, a church bell, pews, and major repairs to church towers. He organized a church choir and processions. In March 1972, Matulaitis was warned by the Soviet authorities that including children in such activities was in violation of the Soviet law. This warning was published in the Chronicle of the Catholic Church in Lithuania.

In September 1973, Matulaitis was reassigned as a vicar to Vievis and soon promoted to parson. During his time in Vievis, Matulaitis organized repairs to church's towers. At the time, Vievis functioned as the seat of the Diocese of Kaišiadorys. Matulaitis supported imprisoned Lithuanian priests (including Juozas Zdebskis, Vincentas Sladkevičius, Julijonas Steponavičius) and thus was not acceptable to Soviet authorities who pressured diocese administrator to remove Matulaitis to a more remote parish.

In April 1975, Matulaitis was assigned to Butrimonys. He once again worked to repair and reconstruct the local church (new oak ceiling, central heating, doors and windows, including eight stained glass, refurbished church organ) and the clergy house. In September 1983, Matulaitis was assigned to Merkinė first as the parson then as the dean. He worked to repair the church (replace roof, install heating) and expand the clergy house to provide a place for community gatherings.

=== Bishop ===
Bishop Vincentas Sladkevičius was promoted to Archbishop of Kaunas on 10 March 1989. On 7 February 1989, Matulaitis was nominated as the Titular Bishop of Sicilibba and apostolic administrator of the Diocese of Kaišiadorys. He was ordained together with Juozas Žemaitis on 18 March 1989 by Vincentas Sladkevičius who was assisted by Julijonas Steponavičius, Juozas Preikšas and Vladas Michelevičius. Matulaitis became bishop of Kaišiadorys on 24 December 1991.

Matulaitis supported women's congregations: he invited the Sisters of the Immaculate Conception of the Blessed Virgin Mary in 1989 and the Salesian Sisters of Don Bosco in 2009 to Kaišiadorys, helped Sisters of Eucharistic Jesus establish a retreat center in Guronys, He helped organize the local chapter of Caritas Lithuania and was its chairman. Under his direction, Caritas established a shelter for the elderly in Kruonis and an orphanage in Paparčiai.

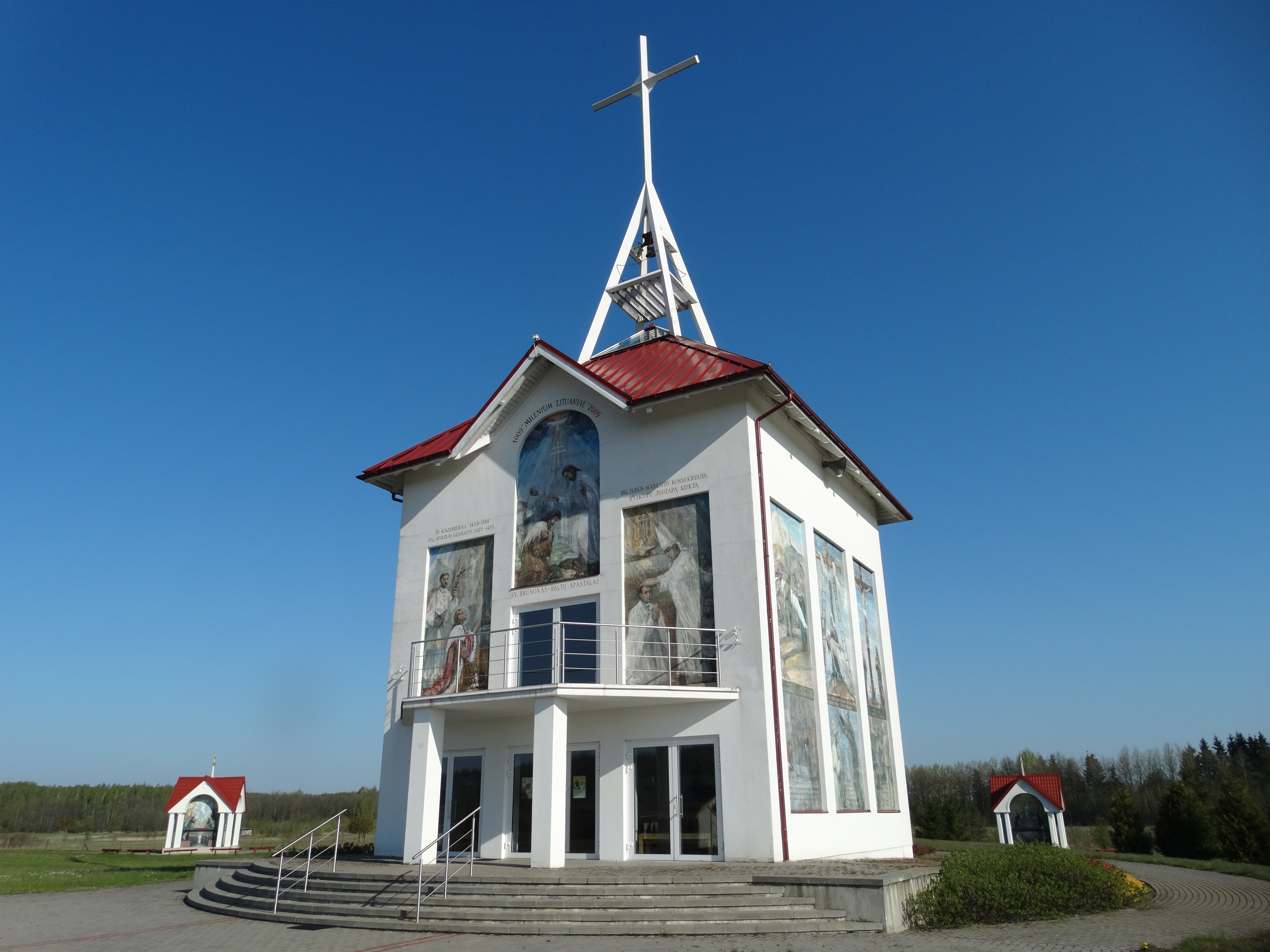
Main chapel in Guronys

In 1990, he established the local Catechetical Centre to prepare religion curriculum, textbooks, and teachers. In 1991–1994, he chaired a committee that coordinated efforts to introduce religious education in Lithuanian schools. In 1996, he established the Family Center. Its main purpose is to prepare engaged couples for the marriage sacrament. The Youth Centre was established in 1999. It organizes various events for youth, including annual gatherings in Pivašiūnai during the Feast of the Assumption of Mary. In 2008, Matulaitis relaunched a prayer group inspired by the Association of the Living Rosary.

Matulaitis worked to commemorate the legacy of his predecessors. Sculptures of Teofilius Matulionis and Vincentas Sladkevičius were erected near the Kaišiadorys Cathedral and Birštonas Sacral Museum focused on their lives was opened in 2000. Matulaitis sponsored the publication of biographies of Juozapas Kukta, Teofilius Matulionis, and other priests. The beatification case of Teofilius Matulionis was completed and transferred to the Congregation for the Causes of Saints in 2008. The Park of the Mysteries of the Rosary with six chapels, a sculpture of Mary, mother of Jesus, and a retreat house was established in Guronys, the birthplace of Sladkevičius. It opened in 2008.

Matulaitis established contacts with German clergy, particularly bishop Leo Nowak of the Diocese of Magdeburg. Lithuanians received financial support for various projects and charitable donations for low-income households. One of the projects was the first demonstration wind turbine near Vydmantai launched in 2004. In March 1992, Matulaitis visited Canada to raise funds for the construction of the Jakštas printing press in Kaišiadorys. It was completed in 1994, but later sold to a private investor.

Matulaitis worked on various repairs of Kaišiadorys Cathedral, including new fence and main gate, new altar, new organ, and refurbishment of the interior decor. He also worked to repair administrative buildings of the diocese. The diocese recovered Soviet-nationalized vacation home in Birštonas which was converted into a hotel and former monastery in Aukštadvaris which was reconstructed to house a shelter for the elderly and a study center. During Matulaitis' tenure, new churches were built in Elektrėnai (1996), Ryliškiai (1993), Senoji Varėna (1994), and Kiaukliai (2000).

Matulaits was awarded the Independence Medal in 2000, the honorary citizenship of Kaišiadorys in 2012 and of Varėna District Municipality in 2026.

Matulaitis retired on 25 March 2012. He lived as bishop emeritus in Kaišiadorys. He died on 8 November 2026 and was buried in a crypt of Kaišiadorys Cathedral.

== Bibliography ==
- Grižienė, Birutė (2011). Kunigystės pilnatvė. Kaišiadorių vyskupas Juozas Matulaitis (PDF) (in Lithuanian). Kaišiadorys: Kaišiadorių muziejus. ISBN 978-9986-646-39-6.
- Ivanauskas, Jonas (8 November 2026). "Mirė Kaišiadorių vyskupas emeritas Juozas Matulaitis" (in Lithuanian). Kaišiadorių vyskupija.
- "Pirmoji Lietuvoje vėjo elektrinė sėkmingai veikia iki šiol". Pamarys (in Lithuanian). 18 April 2023.
- Puidokas, Mindaugas (9 November 2026) [2018]. "Juozapas Matulaitis". Visuotinė lietuvių enciklopedija (in Lithuanian). Mokslo ir enciklopedijų leidybos centras.
