= Catholic Church in Lithuania =

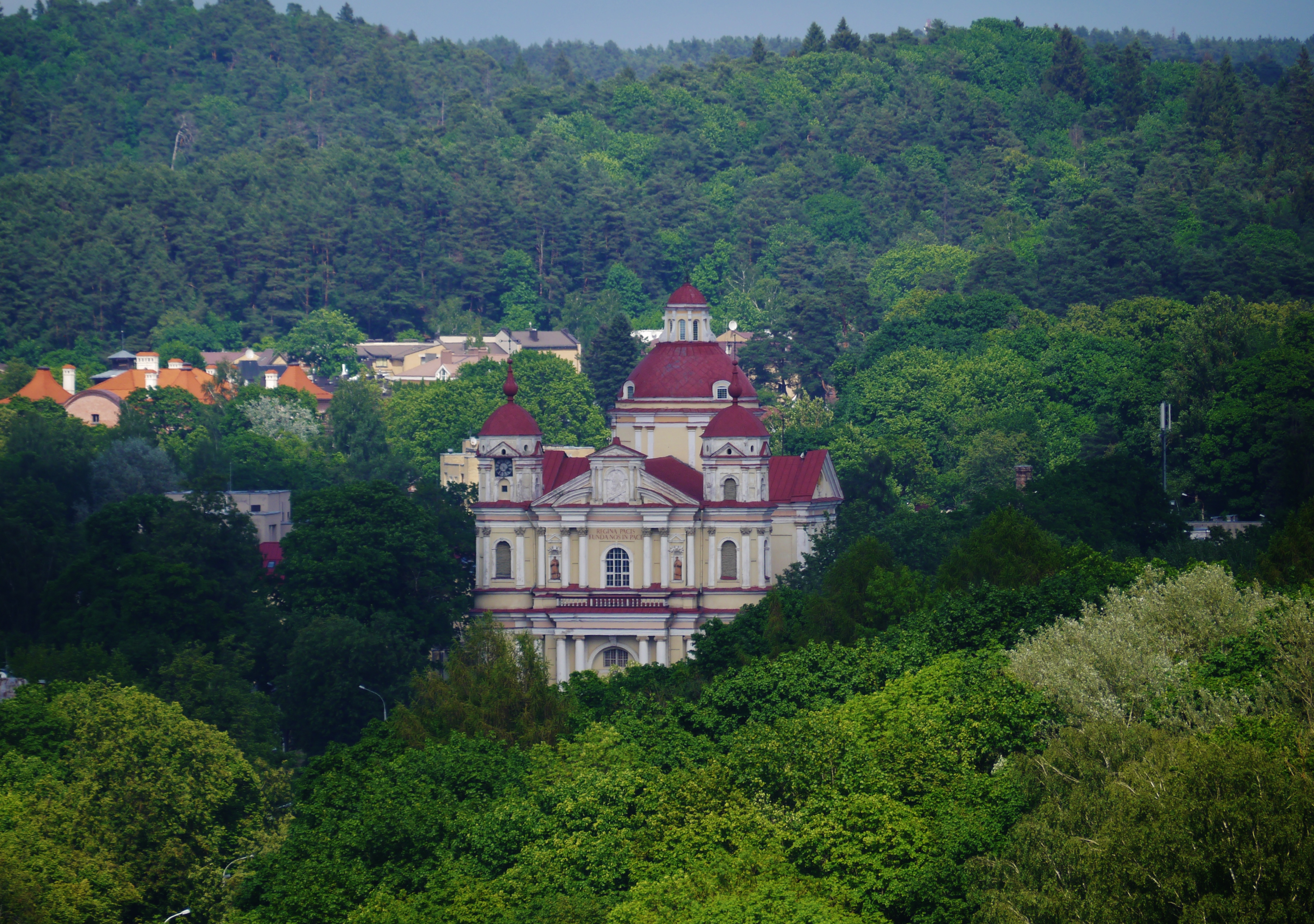
Church of Sts. Peter & Paul, in Vilnius. The building is considered to be among the most beautiful Catholic Churches in the world.

The Catholic Church in Lithuania (Lithuanian: Katalikų Bažnyčia Lietuvoje) is part of the worldwide Catholic Church, under the spiritual leadership of the Pope in Rome. Lithuania is the world's northernmost Latin Catholic-majority country. Pope Pius XII gave Lithuania the title of "northernmost outpost of Catholicism in Europe" in 1939. The Vilnius Cathedral is the most important Catholic Church in Lithuania, which was previously used for the inauguration ceremonies of Lithuanian monarchs with Gediminas' Cap, while in modern times it is a venue for masses dedicated to the elected Presidents of Lithuania after their inauguration ceremonies and giving of oaths to the Nation in the Seimas Palace.

Among the Baltic states, Lithuania is the country with the highest percentage of Catholic population. Almost three-quarters (74.19%) of Lithuania's population self-identified as Catholics in the 2021 census down from 80% in 2007. The country is divided into eight dioceses including two archdioceses and a military ordinariate.

St. Casimir (Kazimieras, 1458–1484) is the only canonized saint of Lithuania. He is the patron of the country and Lithuanian youth. Polish saint Raphael Kalinowski was born in Lithuania's capital Vilnius, then controlled by the Russian Empire. Archbishop Jurgis Matulaitis-Matulevičius (1871–1927) was beatified in 1987, archbishop Teofilius Matulionis (1873–1962) was beatified in 2017.

== History ==
=== Middle Ages (c. 1000–1500) ===
==== 11th century ====
Saint Bruno of Querfurt, a missionary bishop, was martyred in 1009 for proclaiming the Christian faith. While some historians assert that he was killed by the Lithuanians, Zigmas Zinkevičius disputes this, arguing that Bruno met his death in territories inhabited by the Yotvingians. It was in connection with this event that the name of Lithuania was first recorded.

==== 13th century ====
The spread of Catholicism in Lithuania began in the 13th century. During the reign of Mindaugas (r. 1230s–1263), the Dominican Order and the Franciscans started establishing their presence in the region. In 1231, Saint Hyacinth of Poland, a Dominican, arrived in Lithuania. In 1251, a delegation sent by Mindaugas informed Pope Innocent IV of the ruler’s desire to be baptized as a Roman Catholic. The Pope warmly welcomed Lithuania’s conversion, issuing no fewer than six papal bulls on the matter. In the first half of 1251, Mindaugas, along with many of his subjects—including a portion of the Lithuanian nobility—embraced Roman Catholicism through baptism.

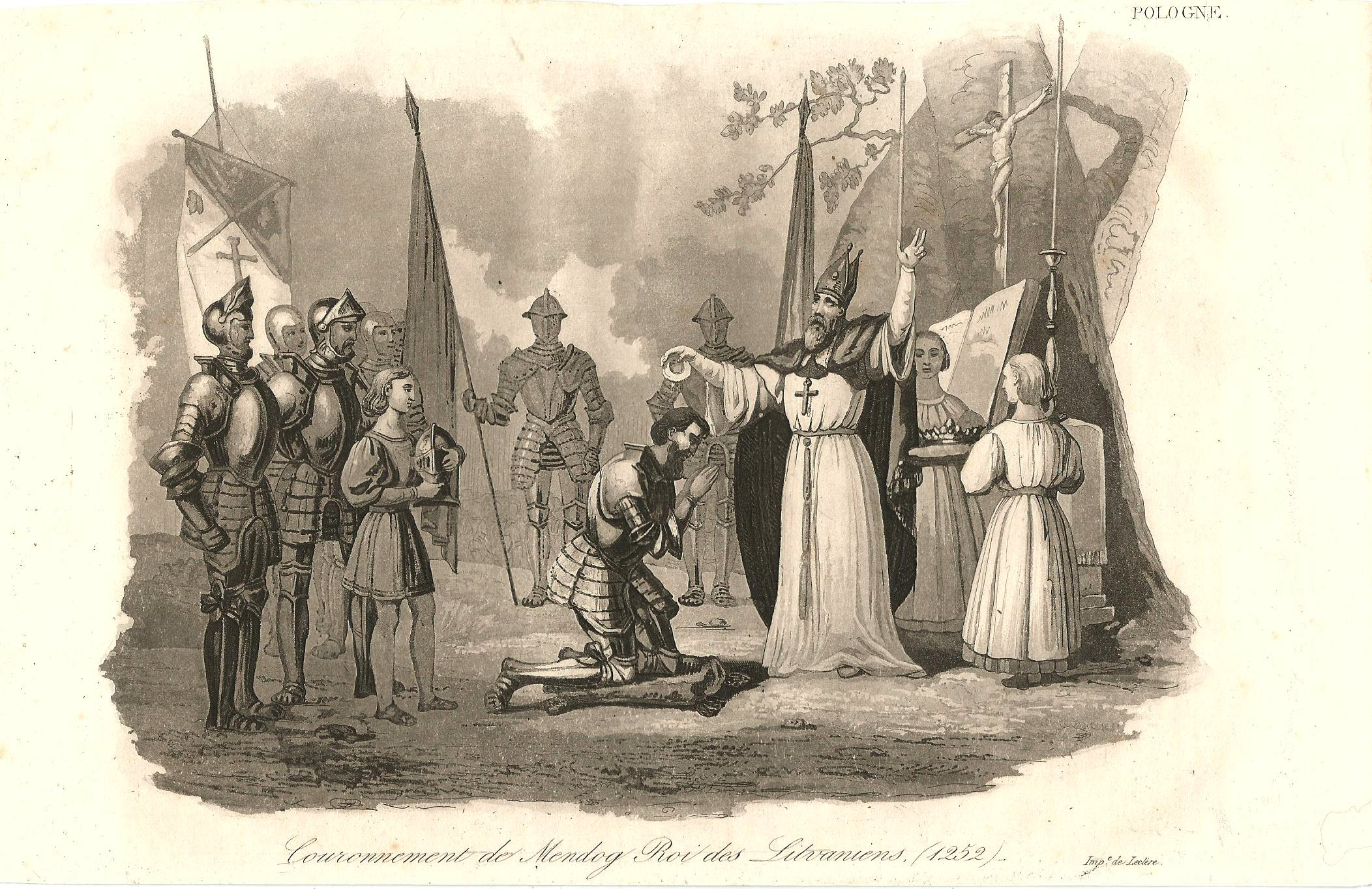
19th-century depiction of the Lithuanian King Mindaugas being baptised.

The baptism of the ruler marked Lithuania’s emergence as an officially Catholic nation, gaining international recognition as early as the 1250s. In response, Pope Innocent IV instructed Heidenreich, the Bishop of Chełmno, to crown Mindaugas with a royal crown in the Pope’s name. On July 6, 1253, Mindaugas was crowned King of Lithuania, and his wife, Morta, became Queen. On August 21 of the same year, the Pope appointed priest Christian as the first Bishop of Lithuania, thereby establishing the Diocese of Lithuania. According to the Lithuanian bishop Jonas Boruta,

"A separate diocese directly subordinate to the Pope is already a considerable step for the creation of an ecclesiastical province, and in the Lithuania of Mindaugas' time (if not for unfortunate political events - the murder of Mindaugas, etc.) there were all the conditions for the establishment of an ecclesiastical province as well.."

Following Mindaugas’ assassination, Treniota seized power in 1263 and ruled Lithuania for approximately a year, during which he initiated a persecution of Christians. After Treniota’s death in 1264, Lithuania came under the rule of Mindaugas’ son, Vaišvilkas (r. 1264–1267), and subsequently Mindaugas’ son-in-law, Shvarn (r. 1267–1269), both of whom adhered to the Orthodox faith. Shvarn’s reign ended amid internal power struggles, and the succeeding Grand Dukes of Lithuania reverted to pagan beliefs.

==== 14th century ====
In the 14th century, Lithuania’s pagan rulers, like Vytenis and Gediminas, constructed Catholic churches and welcomed Catholic priests and monks. For instance, Vytenis (r. 1295–1316) built a Catholic church in Navahrudak and requested two Franciscan monks to manage it. However, knights from the Teutonic Order later destroyed the church.

===== Gediminas' rule (1316–1341) =====
Gediminas (r. 1316–1341), Vytenis’ pagan successor, allied with the Archbishop of Riga against the Teutonic Order. This partnership began in 1298, allowing Riga’s Franciscans and Dominicans to work freely in Lithuania. Later, Archbishop Friedrich von Pernstein successfully set up Franciscan and Dominican monasteries in Lithuanian cities. These monks were active on Gediminas’ lands. In Vilnius, two churches were built—one for the Dominicans and one for the Franciscans. Encouraged by these monks and driven by political aims, Gediminas wrote to the Pope in 1322, promising to convert to Roman Catholicism. In 1323, he sent letters to monastery leaders in Western Europe, inviting priests, monks, and lay Christians to Lithuania with a promise of religious freedom.

In June 1324, the Pope promised to send legates to Gediminas, and they reached Riga by autumn. Gediminas refused baptism and acted as if he never promised to convert. He blamed the confusion on a Franciscan who wrote the letter to the Pope. Despite this, the monks kept working to spread Catholicism in Lithuania.

===== Co-rule by Algirdas and Kęstutis (1345–1377) =====
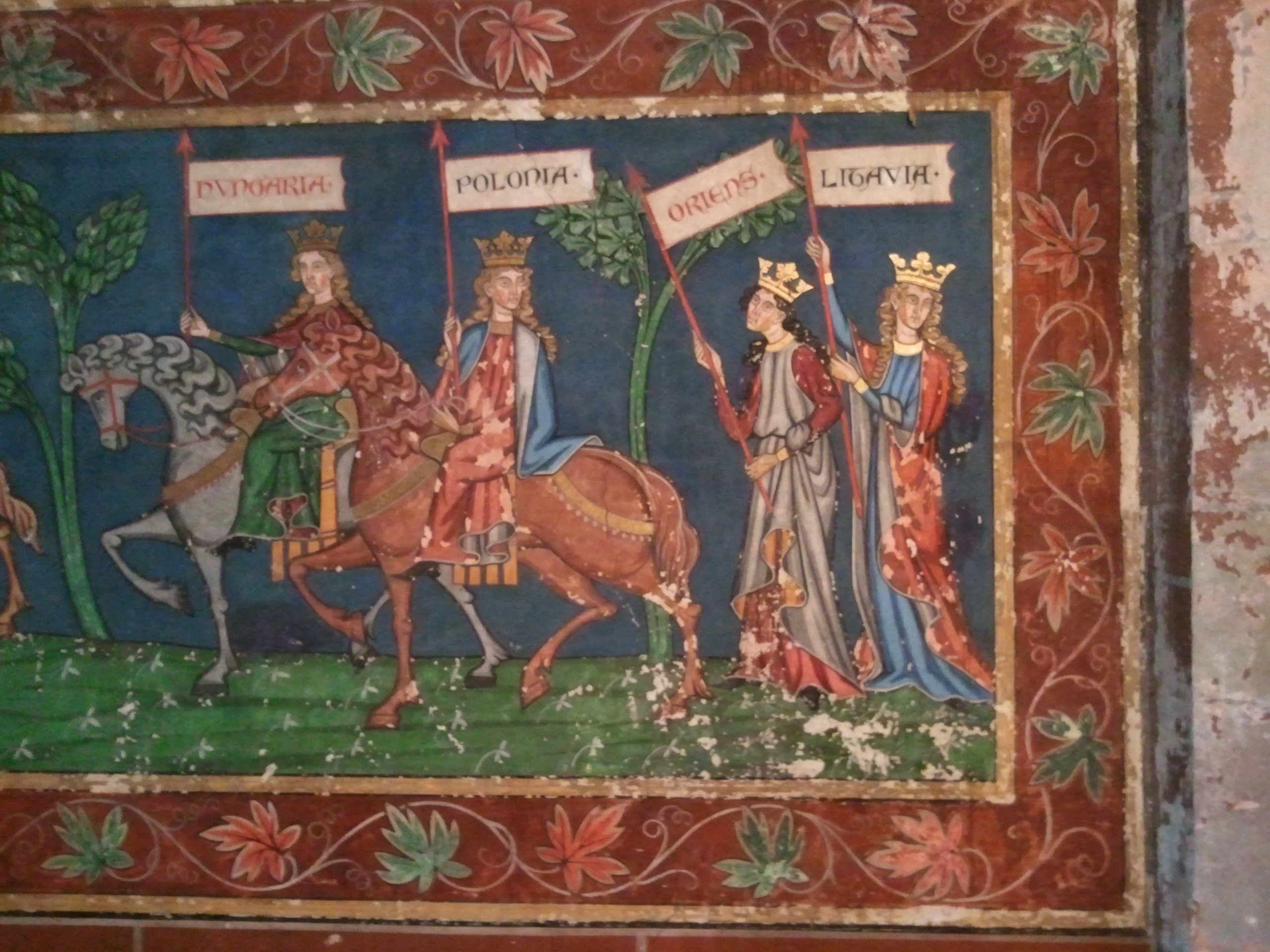
14th–15th century fresco in Strasbourg showing Europe's states marching towards Christianity. From the 15 figures, portraying states, arranged chronologically according to their conversion to Christianity, the last of them is Lithuania.

Gediminas’ sons, Algirdas and Kęstutis, ruled Lithuania together from 1345 to 1377 and stayed pagan their whole lives. Algirdas, who married Duchess Maria of Vitebsk in 1318, inherited the Principality of Vitebsk in 1320, allowed his children to be baptized Orthodox, and set up the Orthodox Metropolis of Lithuania in the Rus’ lands under his control. Kęstutis was encouraged by the Pope and neighboring rulers like Casimir III of Poland, to become baptised.

In 1351, Louis I (later king of Poland) pushed Kęstutis to get baptized. Kęstutis agreed, but only if Louis returned lands taken by the Teutonic Order and guaranteed his coronation. They swore oaths to the deal, but Kęstutis never went through with baptism.

In 1358, Emperor Charles IV urged both Algirdas and Kęstutis to become Catholic. They promised to convert if the Teutonic Order’s conquered lands were returned and the Order was sent east to fight the Golden Horde Tatars. The deal fell apart, so they stayed pagan.

Though Kęstutis remained pagan, his daughter Danutė was baptized in the 1370s when she married Janusz I, Duke of Masovia. Pope Gregory XI tried to baptize Lithuania in 1373, but that effort failed too.

===== Lithuanian Civil Wars (1381–1384; 1389–1392) =====
Grand Dukes Jogaila (Algirdas’ son) and Vytautas the Great (Kęstutis’ son) worked to bring Christianity to Lithuania. On October 31, 1382, Jogaila signed the Treaty of Dubysa with the Teutonic Order, promising to give them Samogitia up to the Dubysa River in exchange for their help against Kęstutis and Vytautas. He also pledged to be baptized with his followers within four years. When Jogaila didn’t follow through in 1383, the Order backed Vytautas instead. Vytautas was baptized as a Roman Catholic named Wigand on October 21, 1383, in Tepliava. He promised the Order Samogitia up to the Nevėžis River and received control of three castles near the Nemunas River.

In 1385, Jogaila agreed to the Act of Krėva, marrying Queen Jadwiga of Poland (daughter of Louis I of Hungary) and becoming King of Poland. He accepted Roman Catholicism and was baptized as Ladislaus on February 15, 1386, in Kraków, alongside his brothers and cousin Vytautas, who took the name Alexander. In 1387, Jogaila and Bishop Andrzej Jastrzębiec arrived in Vilnius with Lithuanian-speaking Franciscans to baptize Lithuania, mainly Aukštaitija. On February 17, 1387, Jogaila issued a privilege to support Vilnius Cathedral. The Vilnius diocese was established by Pope Urban VI on March 12, 1388. Jogaila helped build churches in places like Maišiagala, Medininkai, and Obolcai, setting up a chapter with a provost, dean, and 10 canons. Most of the clergy were Poles. The first Franciscan monasteries were also founded during this time.

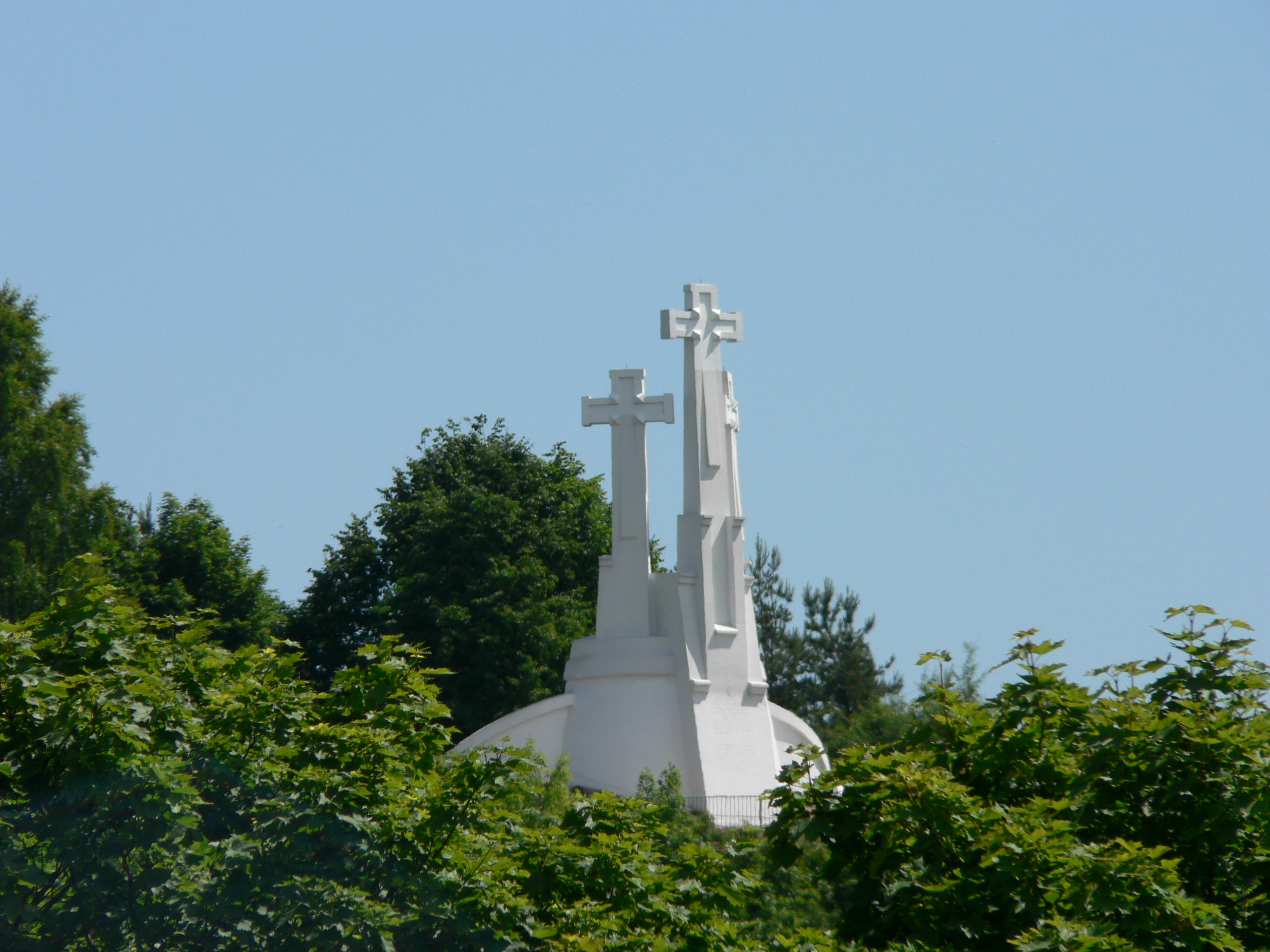
Three Crosses dedicated to the Franciscan martyrs of Vilnius who were killed during the reign of Algirdas and Kęstutis.

Church of Saint Nicholas is the oldest surviving Catholic church in Vilnius, built before 1387

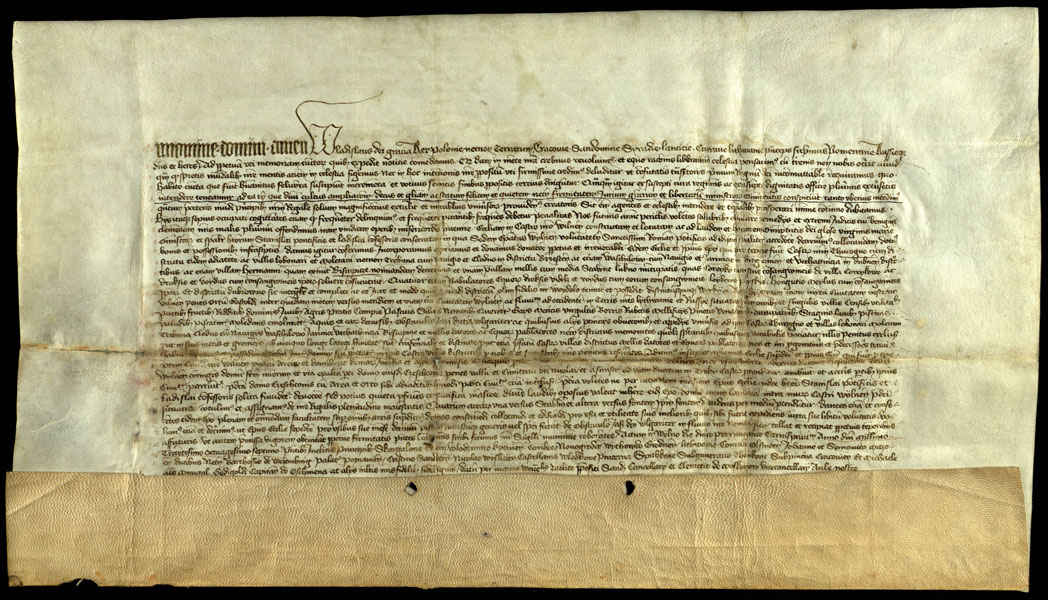
Jogaila's privilege to the Vilnius Cathedral (in Latin), issued on 17 February 1387 in Vilnius

==== 15th century ====
A delegation of Samogitian nobles attended the Council of Constance in 1417 to demonstrate that Jogaila and Vytautas were overseeing the baptism of the Samogitians and to demand that Samogitia remain under Vytautas' governance. Additionally, they requested that the future Samogitian diocese be established under the supervision of the bishops of Vilnius and Lviv. When the Teutonic Order prevented a delegation appointed by the Council from traveling to baptize Samogitia, the bishops of Vilnius and Lviv carried out the task. The baptism of Samogitia took place in 1417, and the Samogitian diocese, based in Medininkai, was founded in 1421 under Pope Martin V. A chapter of six canons was also established, with Matthias of Trakai consecrated as the first bishop of Samogitia. In 1422, Matthias became the bishop of Vilnius, and later, in 1453, the bishop of Lutsk, ensuring that ordained priests spoke Lithuanian. Until 1795, both the Vilnius and Samogitian dioceses were part of the ecclesiastical province of Gniezno.

With the support of rulers such as Vytautas and Jogaila, the number of churches in Lithuania grew rapidly. By the late 14th century, the Vilnius diocese had 17 churches, five of which were in Vilnius itself. Polish historian Jerzy Ochmański notes that by 1392, 10 parishes had been established, increasing to 27 across the Grand Duchy of Lithuania by Vytautas' death in 1430. By the end of the 15th century, Lithuania had 109 churches—91 in the Vilnius diocese and 18 or 19 in the Samogitian diocese, seven of which were founded by Vytautas. Between then and the mid-16th century, 103 churches were built in the Vilnius diocese and 38 in the Samogitian diocese. Around 1500, the Vilnius diocese alone boasted 130 churches.

As dioceses were being established, churches were primarily constructed and endowed by rulers, and later by magnates and nobles. Rulers typically granted land to churches, generating income to sustain parish clergy and maintain buildings, while noble endowments provided funds and church supplies. Noble founders and their heirs often retained the jus patronatus, ensuring the parish was staffed with a clergyman.

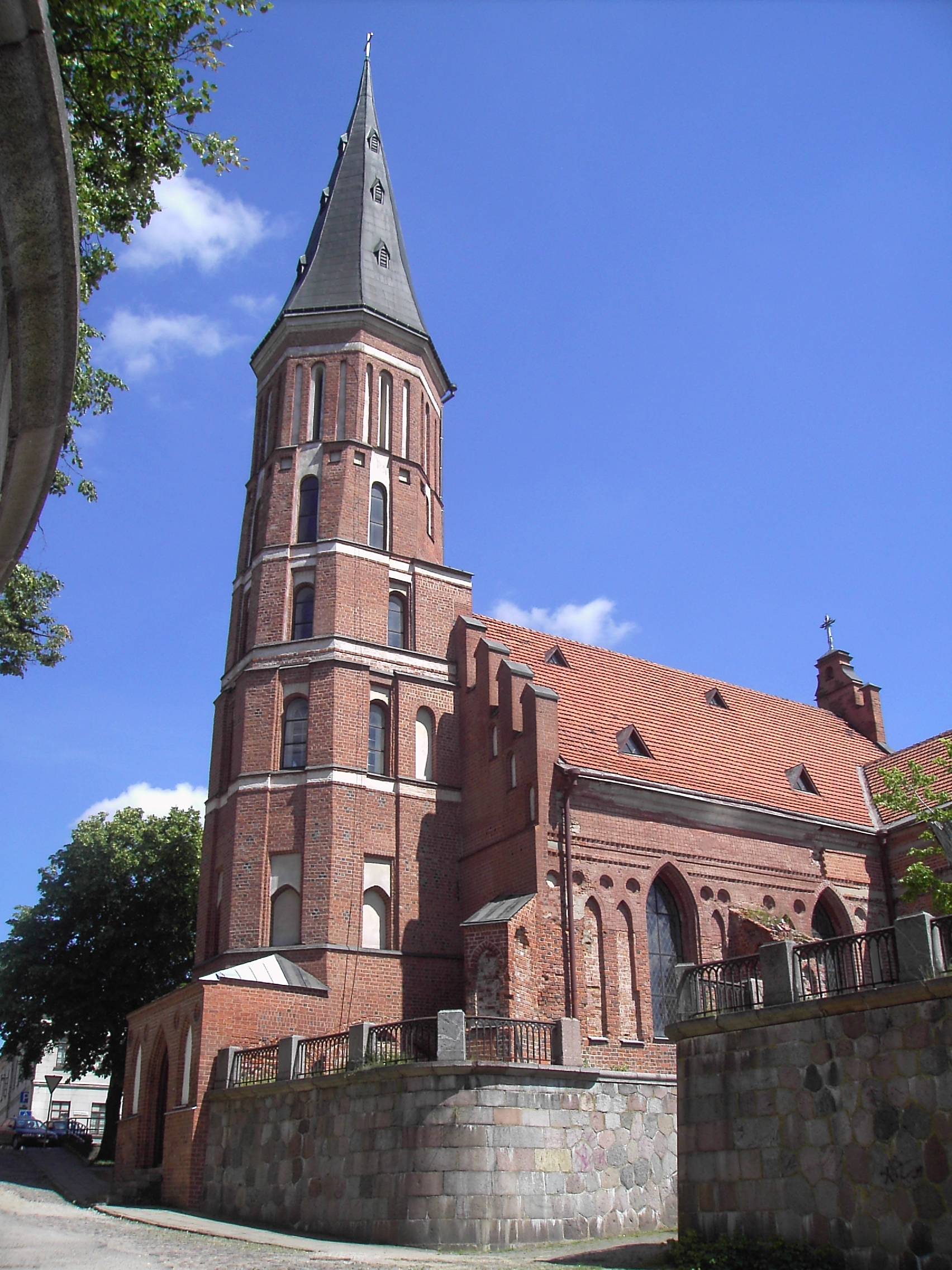
Church of Vytautas the Great in Kaunas, built in the early 15th century

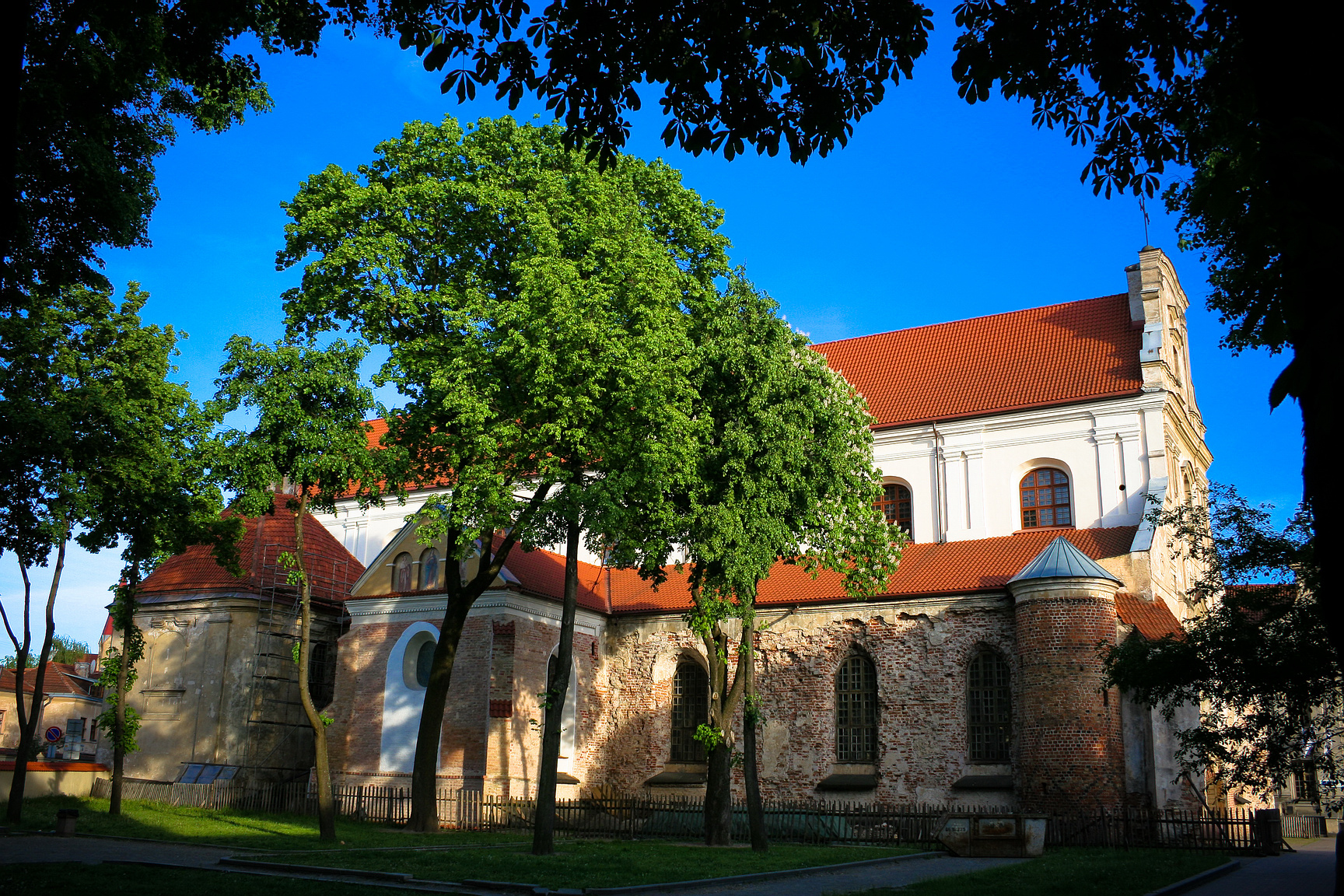
Church of the Assumption of the Blessed Virgin Mary in Vilnius, built in 1421

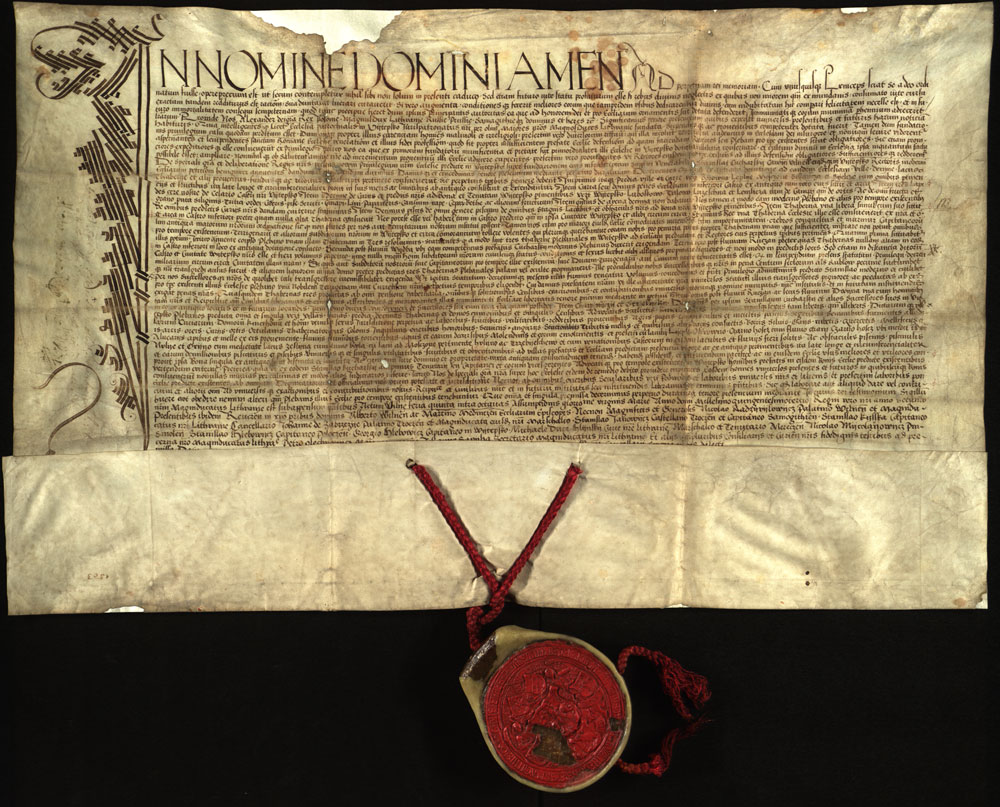
Alexander Jagiellon's privilege in Latin, confirming the foundation of the Vitebsk church, issued on 17 August 1503 in Vilnius

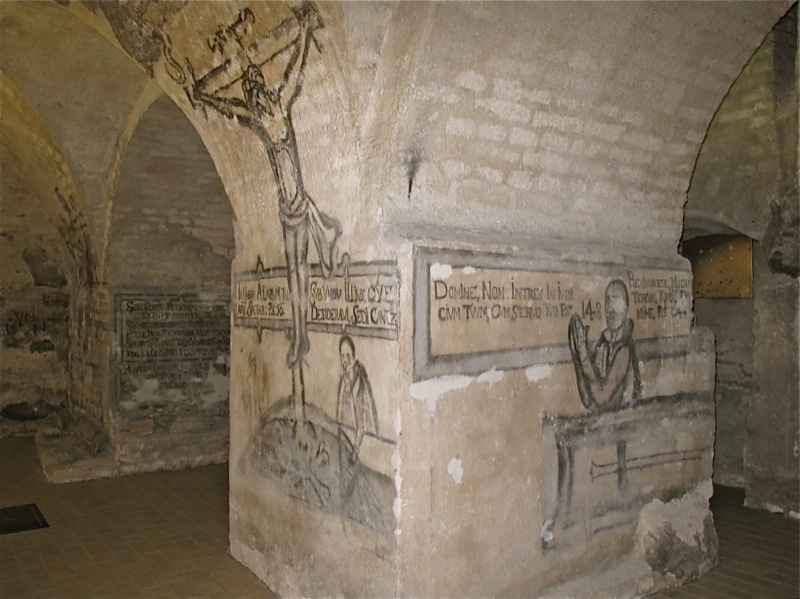
Catholic frescoes from the 16th century in the crypt of the St. Casimir Church in Vilnius.

=== Early Modern period (1500–1795) ===
Roman Catholic churches, where the priests must know Lithuanian, according to the letter of 18 September 1501 by the contemporary Grand Duke of Lithuania.

==== 16th century ====
In 1501, Erazm Ciołek, a provost of Vilnius Cathedral, informed the Pope that Lithuanians preserved and respected their native language (Linguam propriam observant), but also used Ruthenian for practical reasons, as nearly half of the Grand Duchy of Lithuania spoke it. In the 16th century, as the use of Polish increased, the Lithuanian language reached status of literary language. In 1599, Mikalojus Daukša published his Postil and, in its prefaces, noted the improved status of Lithuanian, crediting Bishop Merkelis Giedraitis for his efforts.

Between 1530 and 1540, Reformation and humanist ideas spread into the Grand Duchy, reaching its peak around 1570. Lutheranism dominated at first, followed by Calvinism. This era saw a rise in education and book publishing, including the first Lithuanian printed book – Catechism by Lutheran pastor Martynas Mažvydas in 1547. During the Counter-Reformation, the Catholic Church intensified efforts against Arianism and other Protestant movements. Protestant churches and schools were shut down, and much of the Lithuanian nobility, most notably the Nyasvizh branch of the Radziwiłł family, including Mikołaj Krzysztof Radziwiłł the Orphan and Cardinal Jerzy Radziwiłł, converted to Catholicism.

In 1569, at the initiative of Bishop Walerian Protasewicz, the Jesuits were invited to Vilnius. As they learned the vernacular languages, they began preaching to the local population in their native Lithuanian language, reinforcing the Counter-Reformation effort. Spaniards, Italians, Germans, and Poles began learning Lithuanian in the 1570s, and the first foreigners who learned the language were the Spaniards, who learned it to preach and listen to confessions in Lithuanian. Sometimes they went to the surrounding villages and sometimes organized sermons in Vilnius' streets. Records of Lithuanian Jesuit preachers in Vilnius – with only minor gaps – have survived up to the 18th century. In 1582, Cardinal Jerzy Radziwiłł founded the Vilnius Theological Seminary. Bishop Merkelis Giedraitis (1576–1609), a leading advocate of Catholicism in Samogitia, supported the seminary by sending his clerics there. He also built twelve churches and established new parishes in the region.

The Third Statute of Lithuania, published in 1588, guaranteed equal rights for Catholics, Protestants, and Eastern Orthodox within the Grand Duchy. The Union of Brest in 1596 marked the ecclesiastical union of the Orthodox Church in the Polish–Lithuanian Commonwealth with Rome.

==== 17th–18th centuries ====
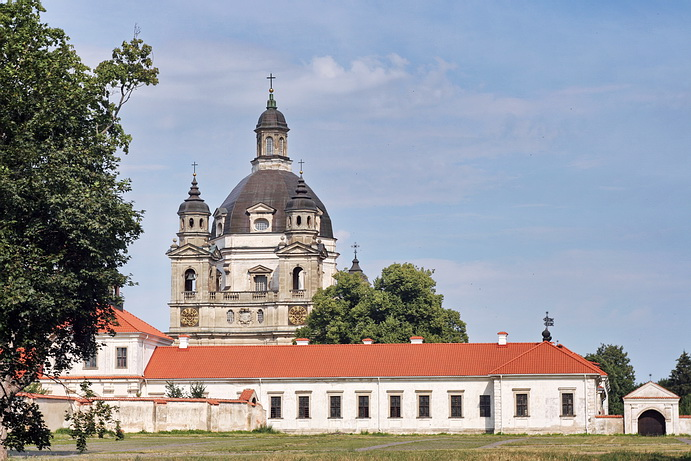
Church and Monastery of Pažaislis in Kaunas

The construction of churches funded by noble patrons and the founding of new monasteries intensified significantly in the 17th and 18th centuries. Schools, hospitals, and shelters were often established alongside them. Most Dominican monasteries in the Grand Duchy of Lithuania were founded in the 17th century. Until the fall of the Lithuanian state in 1795, monasteries gained substantial influence, as monks became active in all areas of religious and cultural life.

The officially Catholic Grand Duchy of Lithuania ceased to exist after the Third Partition of Poland–Lithuania in 1795, carried out by the Protestant Kingdom of Prussia and the Eastern Orthodox Russian Empire. Most Lithuanian territories fell under Russian control. Empress Catherine II of Russia established the Archdiocese of Mogilev in 1782 for her new Catholic subjects.

During the Kościuszko Uprising of 1794, during which the Vilnius uprising also took place, Catholic sermons supporting the insurrection were preached in various languages, including Lithuanian (e.g., by Michał Franciszek Karpowicz), both in churches (e.g., the Church of St. Johns in Vilnius) and among military units.

=== Long 19th century (1795–1914) ===
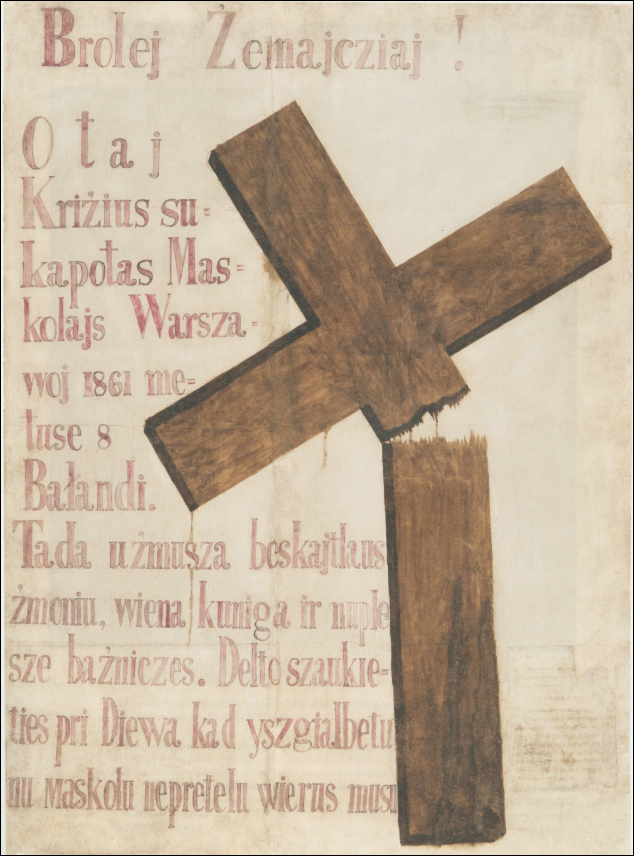
Anti-Russian poster in the Lithuanian language, urging Samogitians to defend the Catholic faith, 1862.

After the uprisings of 1831 and 1863, the tsar's repression against the Catholic Church intensified, and monasteries were closed en masse. These monasteries were previously very involved in religious and cultural activities throughout the former Lithuanian lands and were responsible for many schools, libraries, and charity institutions. During the years of Russian rule, a struggle began within the Catholic Church for the rights of faith and Lithuanian national identity, which were persistently defended by Bishop of Samogitia Motiejus Valančius. Valančius spread faith, sobriety, and literacy among Lithuanians.

=== 20th century ===
Lithuania regained its independence in 1918 and successfully defended it in the Lithuanian Wars of Independence. The Vatican recognized Lithuania's independence de jure in 1922. A concordat was signed in 1927 between Lithuania and the Holy See.

In 1926 the diocesan structure of the Catholic Church was significantly modified by the papal bull Lituanorum gente. Indeed, with the new borders, only the ancient Diocese of Samogitia kept its seat within the new State, since the Diocese of Vilnius was then located on Polish territory: the Diocese of Samogitia became a metropolitan see as the Archdiocese of Kaunas, having as suffragans the new dioceses of Telšiai, Vilkaviškis, Panevėžys, and Kaišiadorys (the latter comprising the remaining Lithuanian territories of the Diocese of Vilnius, which had become an archiepiscopal see in 1925).

==== First Soviet occupation ====
After the Soviet Union occupied Lithuania in the summer of 1940, the Church began to be persecuted. The Church and state were separated. The concordat and diplomatic relations with the Vatican were terminated. Church property was confiscated, religious education in schools was stopped, publishing of Catholic books and newspapers was banned. Dominican monasteries were also closed down. On 11–12 July 1940, many prominent Lithuanian public figures were arrested, including Catholic priests. During the Soviet mass deportation from Lithuania on 14–15 June 1941, 9 Lithuanian Catholic priests were deported. In the beginning of Operation Barbarossa in late June 1941, a total of 15 Lithuanian Catholic priests were murdered. On June 22, priests Justinas Dabrila, Vaclovas Balsius and Jonas Petrikas in Būdavonė forest (Bartninkai district) were martyred by NKVD soldiers.

==== Second Soviet occupation ====
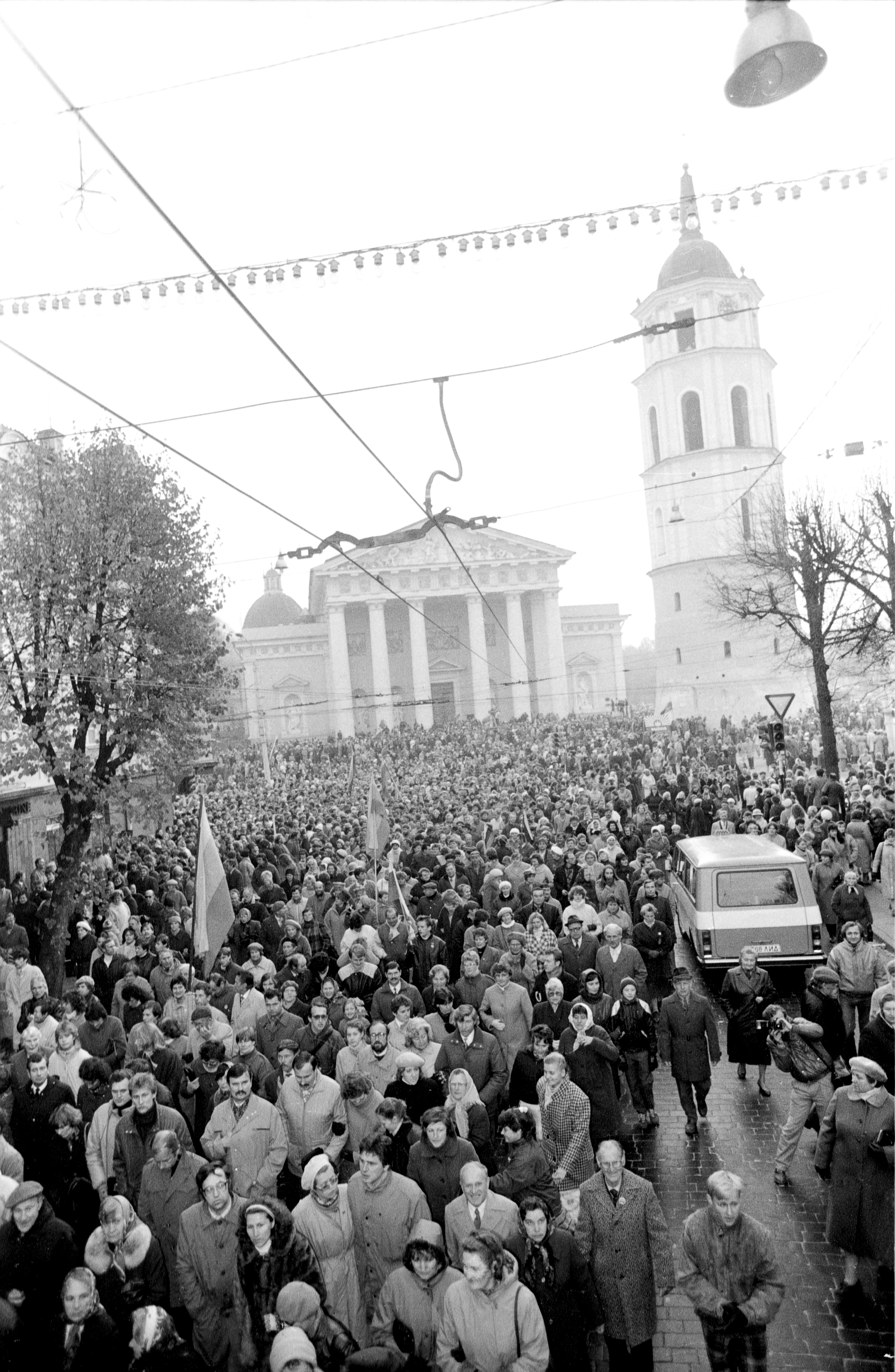
The crowd in Gediminas Avenue, following the mass celebrating the restitution of Vilnius Cathedral to the Catholic community, 1988.

During the second Soviet occupation, which began once the Red Army invaded Lithuanian lands in 1944, the persecution of the Church intensified. This was because of the regime's state atheism, as well as the Catholic Church's involvement in the Lithuanian anti-communist guerrilla war against Soviet occupation. Mass arrests and deportations of Lithuanian citizens, priests and believers, were carried out. Churches were closed down. The restrictions on the church's activities intensified, especially restricting the training of new clergy. In 1946, the bishop of Telšiai Vincentas Borisevičius was arrested and sentenced to death. Later, the bishops Teofilius Matulionis, Pranciškus Ramanauskas, Vilnius archbishop Mečislovas Reinys were arrested and imprisoned. The Soviet state seized the Vilnius Cathedral from the Catholic Church in 1950.

In 1965, during an audience of Rome's Lithuanians with Pope Paul VI he stated that "We are doing everything we can to ensure that the dear Lithuanian nation maintain their faith and that its connection with the See of Saint Peter becomes ever stronger." Pope Paul VI supported the project to establish the Lithuanian Chapel of Our Lady Mater Misericordiae in the St. Peter's Basilica in Vatican City and in 1978 he was the first Pope to congratulate Lithuanians in Lithuanian language on Easter.

In the 1970s, the Catholic Church's underground activity intensified, as underground Catholic newspapers and magazines began to be published, and priests were trained underground. In 1972, the underground publication Chronicle of the Catholic Church of Lithuania began to be published. The number of initiatives to defend religious freedom increased.

Also during the Communist time, Apostolic Visitors were designated by the Holy See for the Lithuanian Roman Catholics in diaspora.

===== Hill of Crosses =====
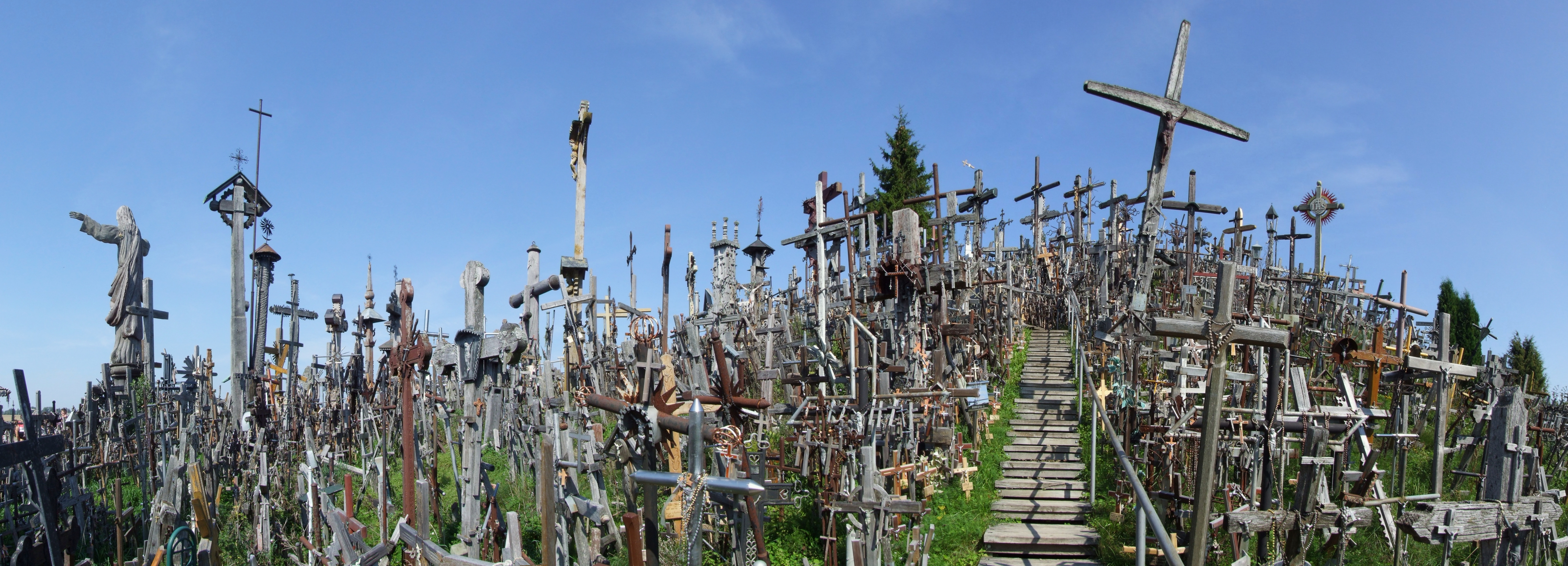
Close view of the Hill of Crosses near Šiauliai

The nationally renowned anti-Communist resistance shrine, the Hill of Crosses, upon which thousands of Latin Rite crosses of all sizes have been placed, is located near the city of Šiauliai. Erecting Latin crosses on the hill was forbidden by the Czarist Russian Orthodox authorities in the 19th century. Later, in the 20th century, the Soviet authorities also forbade such explicit religious symbols. The crosses were removed in 1961 with tractors and bulldozers, but despite Soviet prohibitions, Catholics continued to put small crucifixes and larger crosses on the Hill of Crosses. Pope John Paul II visited the hill during his visit to Lithuania, primarily because it was a sign of anti-Communist Catholic resistance, as well as a Catholic religious site. Lithuania was the only majority-Catholic Soviet republic.

=== Independent Lithuania ===
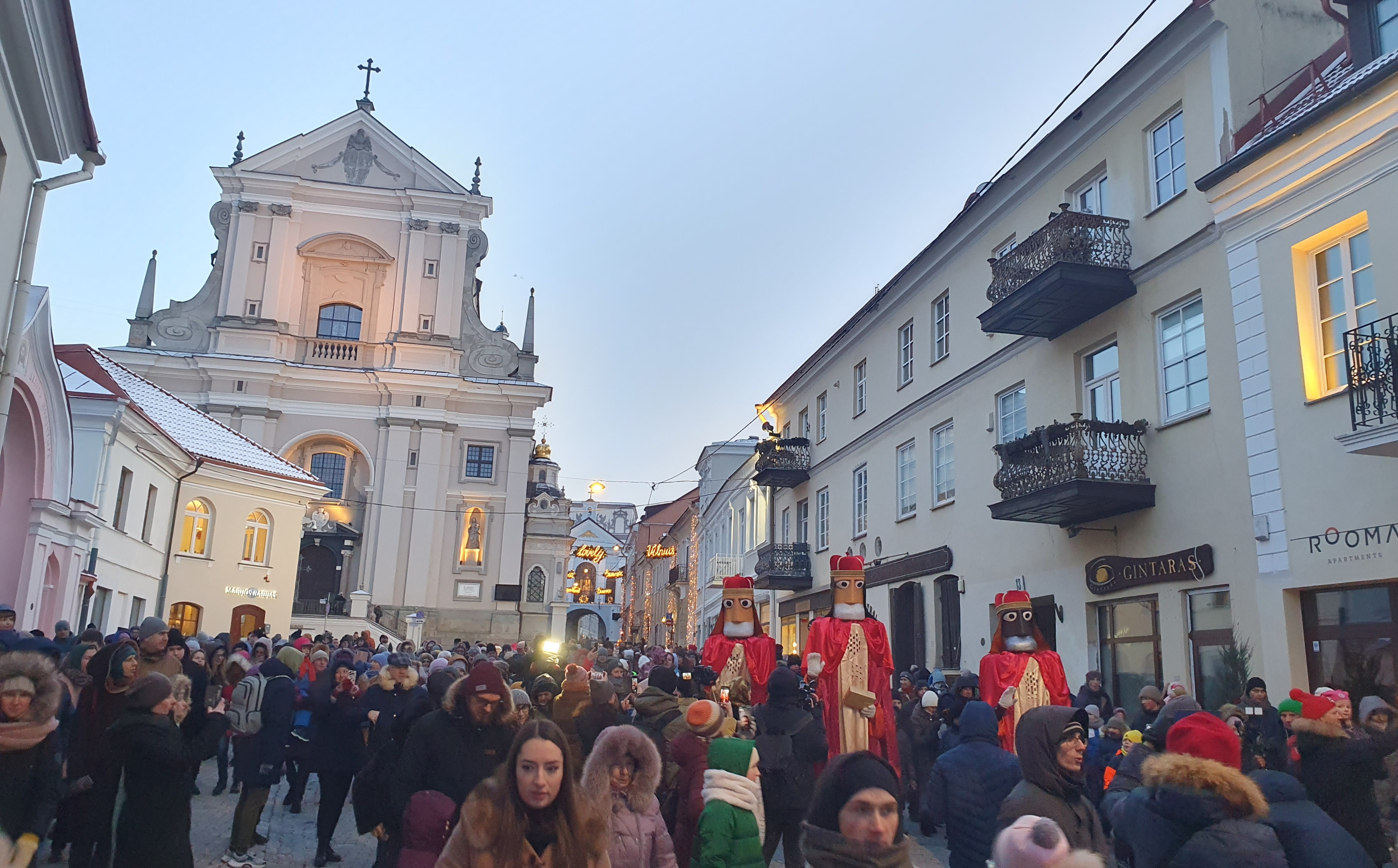
Three Kings' Day procession near the Church of St. Theresa and Gate of Dawn in Vilnius in 2023

Lithuania regained its independence once more in 1990, during the dissolution of the Soviet Union. The Catholic Church is an influential factor in the country, and some priests actively led the resistance against the Communist regime and, after independence was regained, in support of traditionalism, especially in ethical questions.

In 1993, Pope John Paul II visited Lithuania and after his prayer in the Chapel of Saint Casimir in the Vilnius Cathedral said that "the heart of the Lithuanian nation beats in this sanctuary".

The Catholic Church in Lithuania has after independence continued to campaign against liberal and socialist measures, especially in ethical questions.

The treaties of the Holy See and the Republic of Lithuania entered into force in 2000. Since then, the relations between the Catholic Church and the Lithuanian state have been regulated by three special treaties of the Republic of Lithuania and the Holy See, instead of the concordat.

On 22–23 September 2018, Pope Francis made an official visit to Lithuania and held masses in Vilnius and Kaunas.

On 7 December 2024, Pope Francis made Rolandas Makrickas a cardinal and later it was revealed that Makrickas in the Testament of Pope Francis was named as having been given the instructions for the burial of Pope Francis, who died on 21 April 2025, at Santa Maria Maggiore. On 16 February 2025, for the first time in the history of Lithuania three Lithuanian cardinals: Makrickas, Audrys Bačkis, and Sigitas Tamkevičius held a mass in the Vilnius Cathedral commemorating the Independence Day of Lithuania. According to Pope Francis instruction, Makrickas was also named coadjutor archpriest of Santa Maria Maggiore and later on 4 July 2025 replaced his predecessor Stanislaw Ryłko as Archpriest of Santa Maria Maggiore upon Ryłko's 80th birthday.

In June 2026, Vilnius hosted the 6th World Apostolic Congress on Mercy (WACOM 6), held from June 7–12 under the theme "Building the City of Mercy." The congress was organized by the Vatican's Dicastery for Evangelization in collaboration with the Archdiocese of Vilnius and brought together approximately 7,000 participants from around the world. Pope Leo XIV addressed participants of the congress in a video message, while Ecumenical Patriarch Bartholomew I of Constantinople and Lithuanian President Gitanas Nausėda were among those associated with the event.

== Education ==
Christian culture was spread in Lithuania through schools. Until the Third Partition of the Polish–Lithuanian Commonwealth in 1795, education was mainly taken care of by the Catholic Church. Initially, the first schools operated in Vilnius near the Franciscan monastery and cathedral. Vytautas settled the Benedictines in Senieji Trakai in 1409, where it was sought that they would open a school as well. A parish school for the townspeople was established, near the Church of St. Johns, Vilnius, in 1413. More schools appeared in the 15th and 16th centuries. In 1534, the Synod of Vilnius ordered priests to establish schools. The church leadership ordered in 1607 the establishment of primary schools in all parishes, while the higher schools were maintained by Jesuits, Piarists and other monks. In the 18th century, there were about 300 parochial schools in Lithuania, with 5,000 students.

The Jesuits establish a college in Vilnius in 1570. The Vilnius Academy was founded in 1579 by the Jesuits through the reorganization of the college they established nine years prior. The university trained Lithuanian clergymen and published Lithuanian-language religious literature. Jesuits also founded many colleges in other cities. The Jesuits head the Vilnius University until 1773. After the suppression of the Society of Jesus in 1773, the Commission of National Education took over the management of Vilnius University and higher schools.

== Hierarchy ==
Holy See
Archdiocese of Vilnius	Archdiocese of Kaunas	Military Ordinariate of Lithuania
Diocese of Kaišiadorys	Diocese of Panevėžys	Diocese of Šiauliai	Diocese of Telšiai	Diocese of Vilkaviškis

- List of Apostolic Visitors for Lithuanian Catholics in Diaspora (historically, until 2003)

== Catholic churches in Lithuania ==
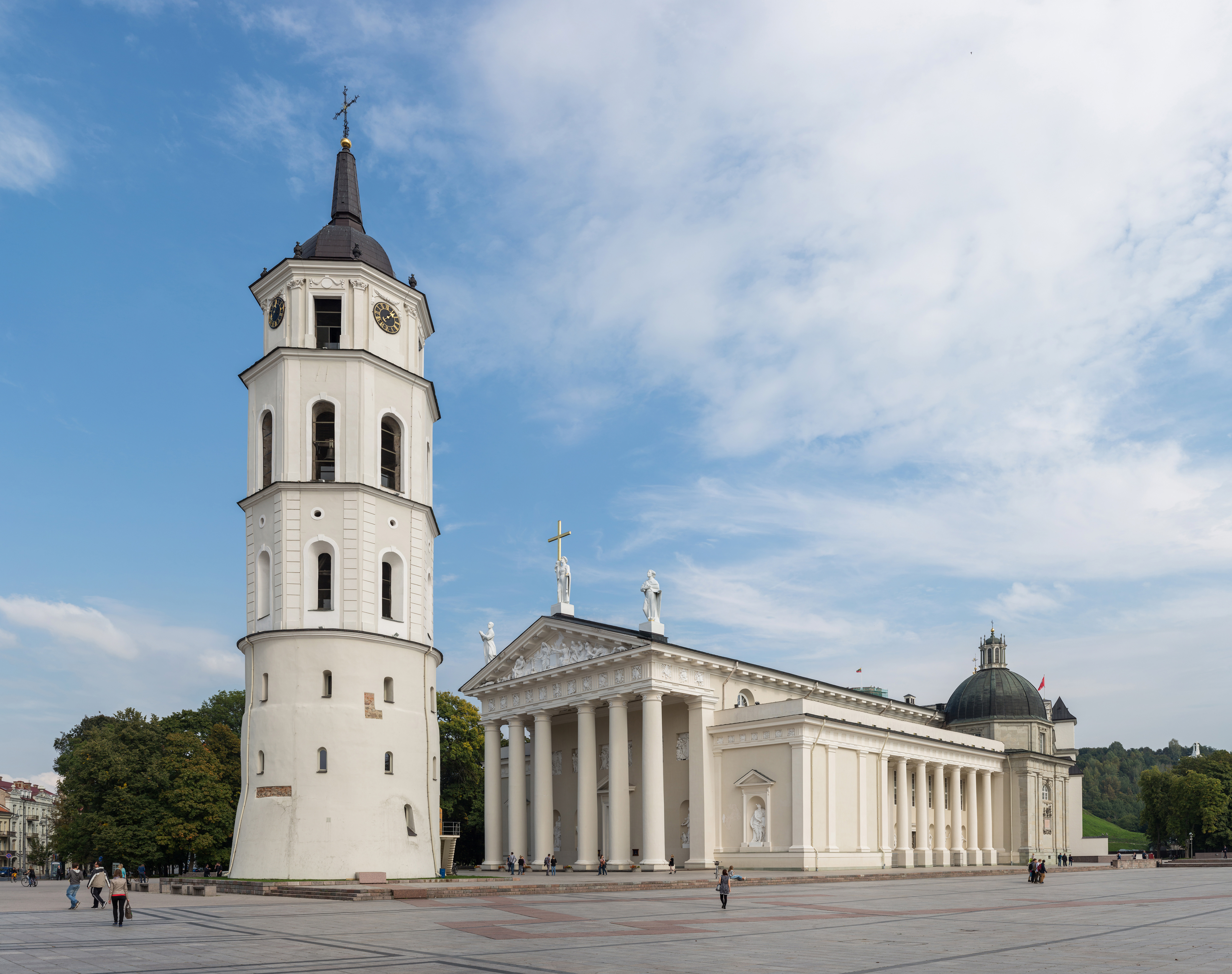
Vilnius Cathedral

The first churches appeared in Lithuania before the introduction of Christianity – they were built by merchants and craftsmen from other countries who lived here. After the baptism in 1387 the number of churches in Lithuania began to grow notably. In the middle of the twentieth century there were as many as 885 Catholic churches and chapels in Lithuania.

The first church in Lithuania, supposedly, was built by the Grand Duke Mindaugas in the thirteenth century. It was Vilnius Cathedral, which in its long history has been repeatedly destroyed and rebuilt. The oldest surviving stone church is St. Nicholas, built in the 14th – 15th centuries. It stands in Vilnius and visitors admire its Gothic and Romanesque features. St. Anne's Church is a masterpiece of late Gothic. The Chapel of the Gate of Dawn storing the icon of the Holy Virgin Mary, Mother of Mercy in Vilnius has many features of late Renaissance and is one of the holy places in Lithuania most visited by pilgrims. Impressive architectural work of baroque is St. Peter and Paul Church in Vilnius. The oldest wooden church of Lithuania is in Palušė, Ignalina district.

== Catholic organizations in Lithuania ==
- Ateitis: Catholic children and youth organization, member of Fimcap
- Caritas Lithuania

== See also ==
- Religion in Lithuania
- Apostolic Nunciature to Lithuania
- Christianization of Lithuania
- Saint Casimir
- List of Catholic pilgrimage sites in Lithuania

== Sources ==
- Ališauskas, Vytautas, ed. (2006). Krikščionybės Lietuvoje istorija (in Lithuanian). Vilnius: Aidai. ISBN 9955-656-18-2.
- Aliulis, Vaclovas (2006-01-17). "Katalikų Bažnyčia". vle.lt (in Lithuanian).
- Beeson, Trevor (1982). Discretion and Valour: Religious Conditions in Russia and Eastern Europe. Fortress Press. ISBN 978-0-8006-1621-2.
- Boruta, Jonas (8 August 1996). "Iš Lietuvos Bažnytinės Provincijos kūrimo istorijos" (PDF). Laiškai lietuviams (in Lithuanian). XLVII (9).
- Paulauskytė, Teresė (2018). "Lietuvos Katalikų Bažnyčia" [Lithuania's Catholic Church]. vle.lt (in Lithuanian).
- Ivinskis, Zenonas (1953-10-08). "Lietuvių kalba viešajame Lietuvos 16–17 amž. gyvenime: žiupsnelis medžiagos iš Romos archyvų". Aidai (in Lithuanian).
- Jagminas, Leonardas (2018-08-10). "dominikonai". vle.lt (in Lithuanian).
- Juergensmeyer, Mark; Roof, Wade Clark (2012). Encyclopedia of Global Religion. SAGE. ISBN 978-0-7619-2729-7.
- katalikai.lt (2007). "Pagrindiniai krikščionybės Lietuvoje istorijos faktai" [The main facts of the history of Christianity in Lithuania]. Katalikų Bažnyčia Lietuvoje (in Lithuanian). Archived from the original on 2007-02-09.
- Stan, Lavinia; Turcescu, Lucian (2011). Church, State, and Democracy in Expanding Europe. Oxford University Press. ISBN 9780199714124.
- Zinkevičius, Zigmas (2000). "Mindaugo krikštas ir lietuviški poteriai". Lietuvių poteriai (in Lithuanian). Vilnius: Mokslo ir enciklopedijų leidybos institutas.
- Zinkevičius, Zigmas (2012-11-16). "Lietuviai ir krikščionybė". XXI amžius (in Lithuanian). 43 (2018).
