= Sicilibba =

Sicilibba was an ancient Roman town of the Roman province of proconsular Africa. The ancient town is tentatively identifiable with the ruins at Alaouine (or Alaouenine) in today's Tunisia.

Sicilibba was also the seat of an ancient Christian bishopric, suffraged by the Archdiocese of Carthage. There are four known (ancient) bishops of Sicilibba.

- Sazio took part in the Council of Carthage (256) called by Saint Cyprian to discuss the issue of the lapsii, those who had fallen away from Christian belief.
- The Donatist Quadraziano attended the Council of Carthage (411), between the Catholic bishops and Donatists of Roman Africa. On that occasion Sicilibba had no Catholic bishop.
- Pretestato participated in the council in Carthage in 419 called by Saint Aurelius.
- Bonifacio took part in the synod assembled in Carthage in 484 by the Arian King Huneric of the Vandal Kingdom, after which Boneface was exiled.

To these bishops, Morcelli adds the donatist Honorius, mentioned in 337. However, According to Mesnage, it would not be the name of a bishop but of the adjective honoratum jugulum that is present in the text on which Morcelli leans. In that case it is to merely identify the Honored Bishop.

Today Sicilibba survives only as a titular bishopric of the Roman Catholic Church, The current bishop is Christoph Hegge, auxiliary bishop of Münster.

== Known bishops ==
- Satius † (mentioned in 256)
- (honorius) fl.337
- Quadraziano (mentioned in 411) (Donatist)
- Pretestato (mentioned in 419)
- Bonifacio (mentioned in about 484)
- Robert Louis Whelan (6 December 1967 – November 15, 1968 succeeded bishop of Fairbanks)
- Maurice Rigobert Marie-Sainte (December 19, 1968 – July 4, 1972 appointed archbishop of Fort-de-France)
- Arnaldo Ribeiro (November 6, 1975 – December 28, 1988 appointed archbishop of Ribeirão Preto)
- Juozapas Matulaitis (March 10, 1989 – December 24, 1991 appointed bishop of Kaišiadorys)
- Ruggero Franceschini, (July 2, 1993 – October 11, 2004 appointed archbishop of Smyrna)
- Joseph Thomas Konnath (January 5, 2005 – January 25, 2010 named Eparca of Battery)
- Christoph Hegge, (May 31, 2010 – present)
