= Kaišiadorys Cathedral =

Cathedral of the Transfiguration of Our Lord
- Kristaus Atsimainymo katedra
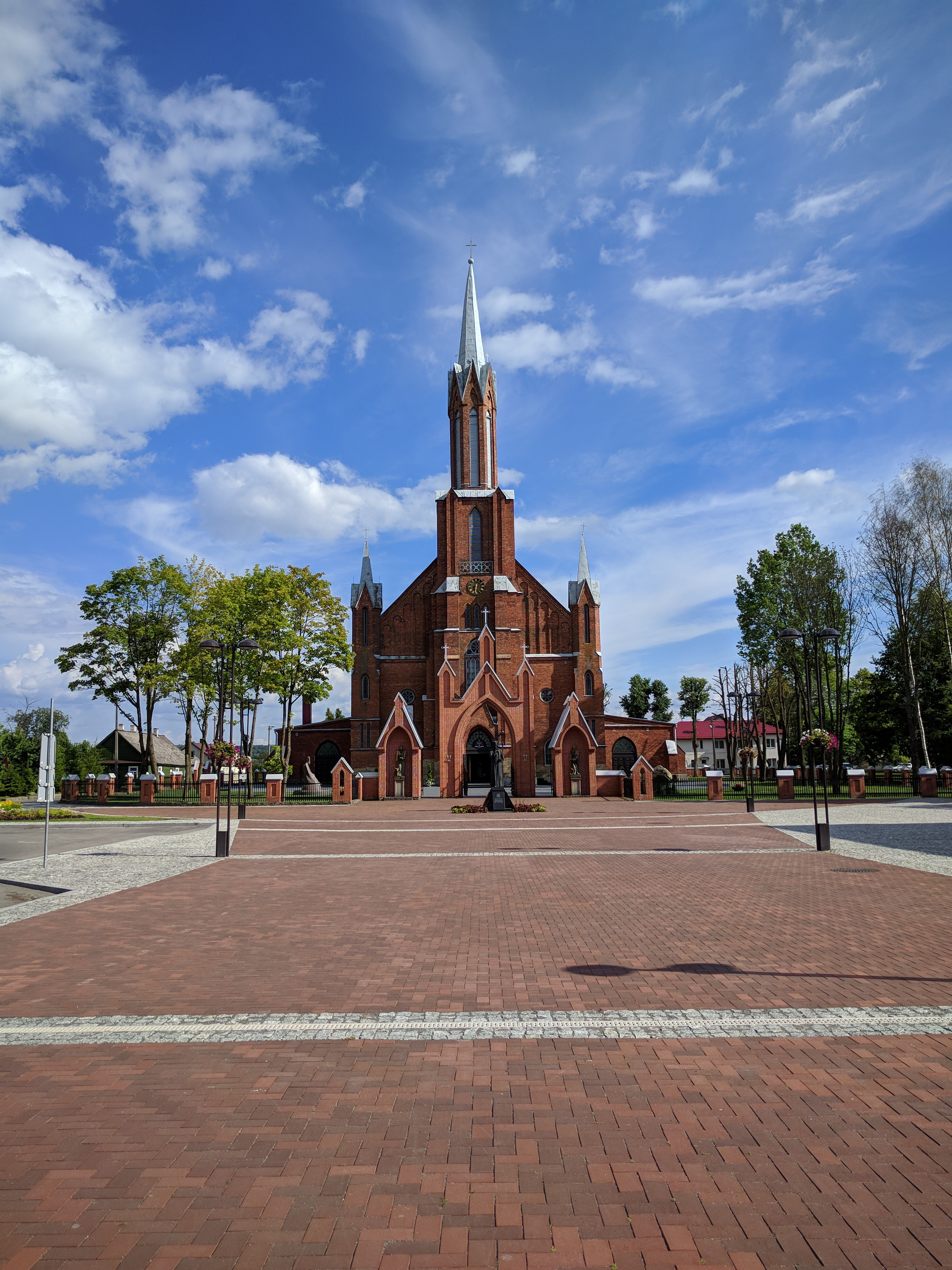

- Location within Lithuania
- 54°51′38″N 24°27′26″E
- Location: Kaišiadorys
- Country: Lithuania
- Denomination: Roman Catholic Church

Architecture
- Architect: Wacław Michniewicz

The Cathedral of the Transfiguration of Our Lord (Lithuanian: Kristaus Atsimainymo katedra) also called Kaišiadorys Cathedral is the name given to a Catholic religious building that serves as the Cathedral of Kaišiadorys, a city of the European country of Lithuania, and the seat of the Diocese of Kaišiadorys.

In 1906 a committee for the construction of the church was created. In the following years three different projects for the construction of the structure were developed. Only in 1914 it was adopted the final, made by Wacław Michniewicz. In 1932 the church was finally built and in 1934 became the headquarters of the curia. On 10 May 1936 the church was elevated to the cathedral and this time Pope Pius XI sent a gift for safekeeping. In 1944 the cathedral was severely damaged as a result of World War II, and during the period of Soviet occupation was closed to worship and destined for another use, until 1987, when Lithuania regained its independence and religious events were reestablished.

The crypt of the cathedral contains the remains of Blessed Teofilius Matulionis, bishop of Kaišiadorys from 1943 to 1962, interred near the remains of his predecessor Juozapas Kukta. A statue of Matulionis stands in the square before the main entrance to the cathedral.

== See also ==
- Cathedral of the Transfiguration of Our Lord, Atyrau
- Catholic Church in Lithuania
- Transfiguration of Our Lord
