= Bartninkai =

- Town
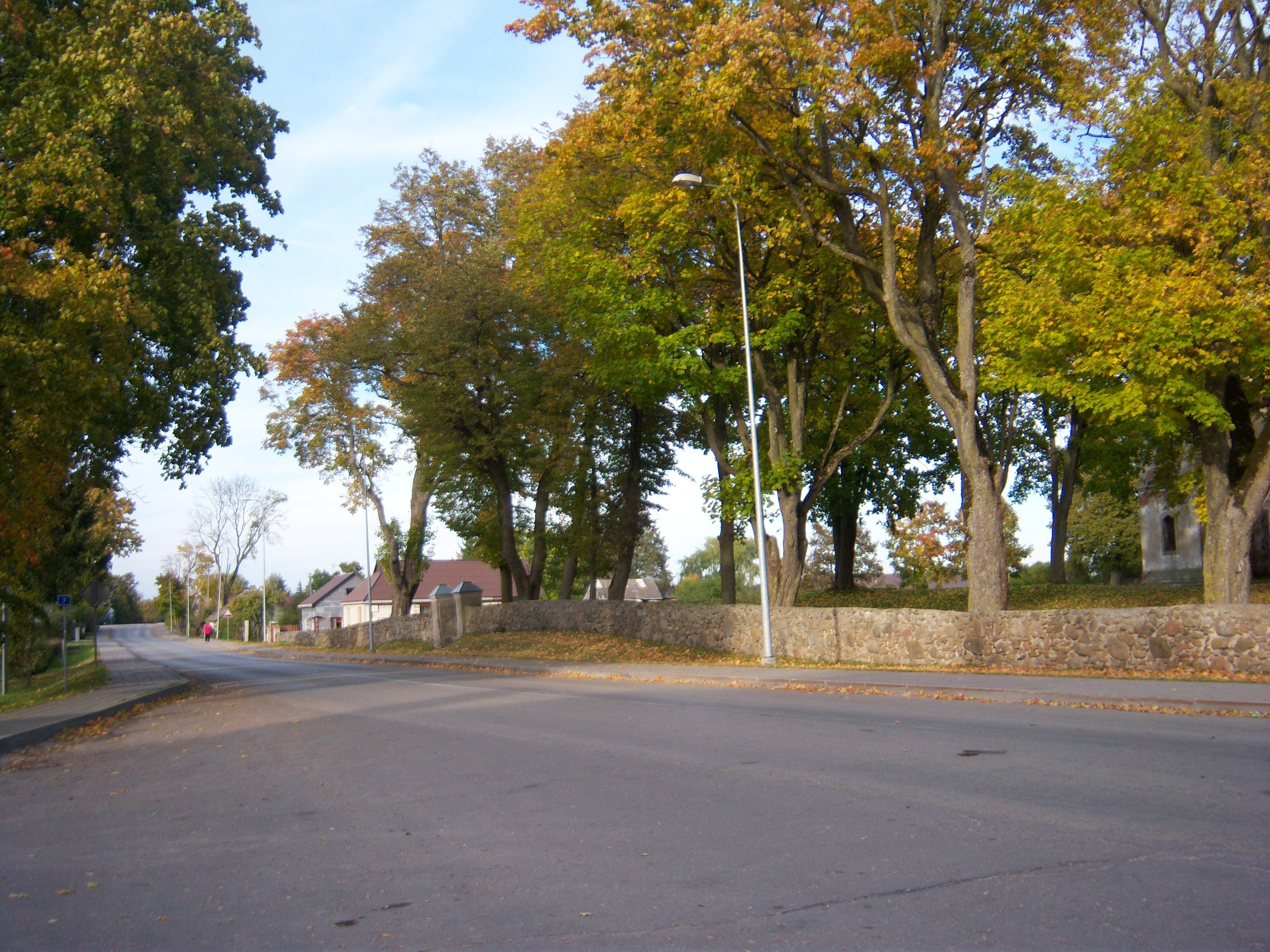

- Flag Coat of arms

- Location within Lithuania
- Coordinates: 54°30′04″N 23°01′32″E
- Country: Lithuania
- County: Marijampolė County
- Municipality: Vilkaviškis District Municipality

Population (2011)
  - Total: 390
- Time zone: UTC+2 (EET)
  - Summer (DST): UTC+3 (EEST)

Bartninkai is a small town in Marijampolė County, Vilkaviškis District Municipality in southwestern Lithuania. The town is located 17 km south of Vilkaviškis. It is the seat of the Bartninkai Eldership.The town is home to the Church of St. Peter and St. Paul, a post office, a clinic, the Bartininkai Jonas Basanavičius High School, a library, and the grounds of the former Bartininkai manor. According to the 2011 census, the town has a population of 390 people.

== History ==
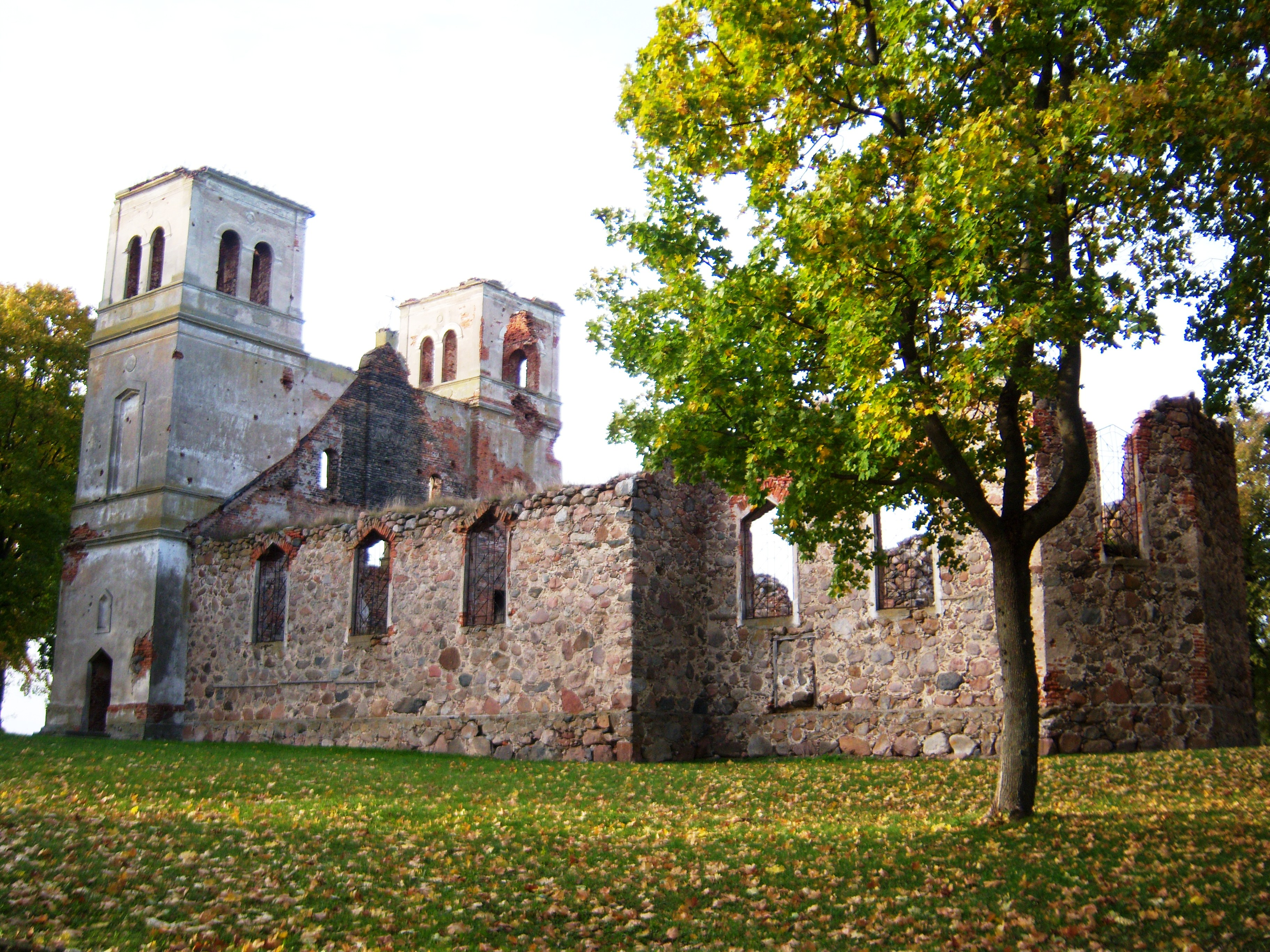
The ruins of the old Bartninkai church (before restoration)

Bartninkai was founded in the second half of the XVI century. In 1649, the village of Bartninkai is recorded having 16 valakas of land. A Catholic church was built in 1663, and a parish was established in 1783 (in 1790 the church was rebuilt of stone masonry, in 1865 towers were added). In 1736 6 families lived in the village. In 1744 Bartninkai was referred to as a town.

Treasurer of the Grand Duchy of Lithuania Antoni Tyzenhauz turned the town into the estate of Bartininkai manor. He oversaw the construction of an iron weaving mill and an iron foundry and built roads to Kalvarija and Pajevonis.

From 1781 to the second half of the XIX century there was a parish school. After the November Uprising of 1830–1831, the Tsar gifted Bartninkai to the Imperial Russian Army Officer of Nostitz family, who declared the estate a majorate. 1861-1950 Bartninkai was the center of the parish.

At the end of 1905, the people of the town drove out the Russian authorities. In 1923 there were 72 households. During World War II the town was almost entirely destroyed. The church was heavily bombed (in 1950 a new wooden church was built next to the ruins of the old one). During the soviet occupation, Bartninkai was a town of Kolkhoz farm. In 1999 the coat of arms of Bartininkai was adopted by a decree of the President of the Republic of Lithuania.
