= Cathedral of the Transfiguration of Our Lord, Atyrau =

Coordinates: 47°5′30.6″N 51°52′43.7″E

Cathedral of the Transfiguration of Our Lord
- Собор Преображения Господня
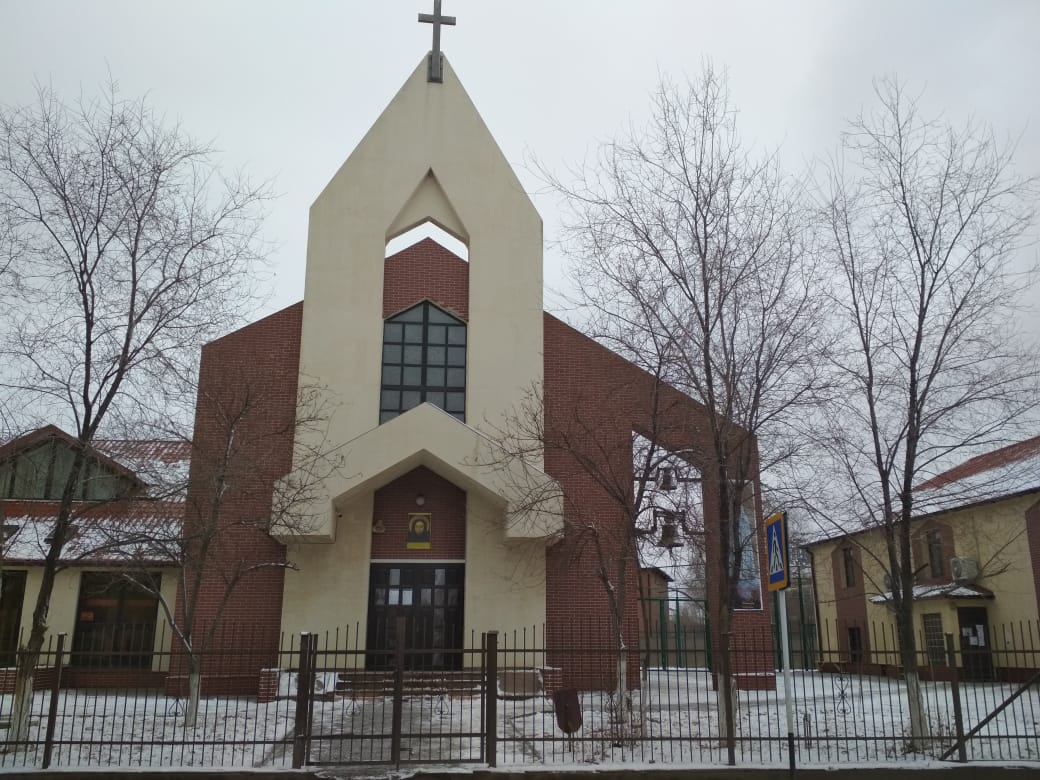
- Cathedral of the Transfiguration of Our Lord
- Location: Atyrau
- Country: Kazakhstan
- Denomination: Roman Catholic Church

The Cathedral of the Transfiguration of Our Lord (Russian: Собор Преображения Господня, romanized: Sobor Preobrazhenia Gospodnya) also called Catholic Cathedral of Atyrau is a religious building affiliated with the Catholic Church which is in the Avangard street of the city of Atyrau, 2 in Eurasian country of Kazakhstan, and which serves as the seat of the apostolic administration of Atyrau.

The local apostolic administration (Latin: Administratio Apostolica Atirauensis, Russian: Апостольская администратура Атырау, romanized: Apostol'skaya administratura Atyrau) was founded in 1999 under the pontificate of John Paul II by the bull "Ad aptius consulendum" while the parish was created. The parish church and the cathedral was consecrated on August 4, 2002. The convent and pastoral center was opened in 2005.

== See also ==
- Cathedral of the Transfiguration of Our Lord, Kaišiadorys
- Catholic Church in Kazakhstan
- Transfiguration of Our Lord
