= Jonas Ivanauskas =

Lithuanian priest (born 1960)

- Bishop of Kaišiadorys
- Church: Catholic Church
- Diocese: Diocese of Kaišiadorys
- Appointed: 11 February 2012
- Predecessor: Juozapas Matulaitis
- Previous posts: Titular Bishop of Canapium (2003-2012); Auxiliary Bishop of Kaunas (2003-2012)

Orders
- Ordination: 14 April 1985
- Consecration: 23 November 2003 by Sigitas Tamkevičius

Personal details
- Born: 18 February 1960 (age 66) Lithuanian SSR, Soviet Union

Jonas Ivanauskas (born 18 February 1960 in Alytus) is a Lithuanian clergyman and bishop for the Roman Catholic Diocese of Kaišiadorys. He was ordained in 1985. He was appointed bishop in 2012.
