= Bartninkai Eldership =

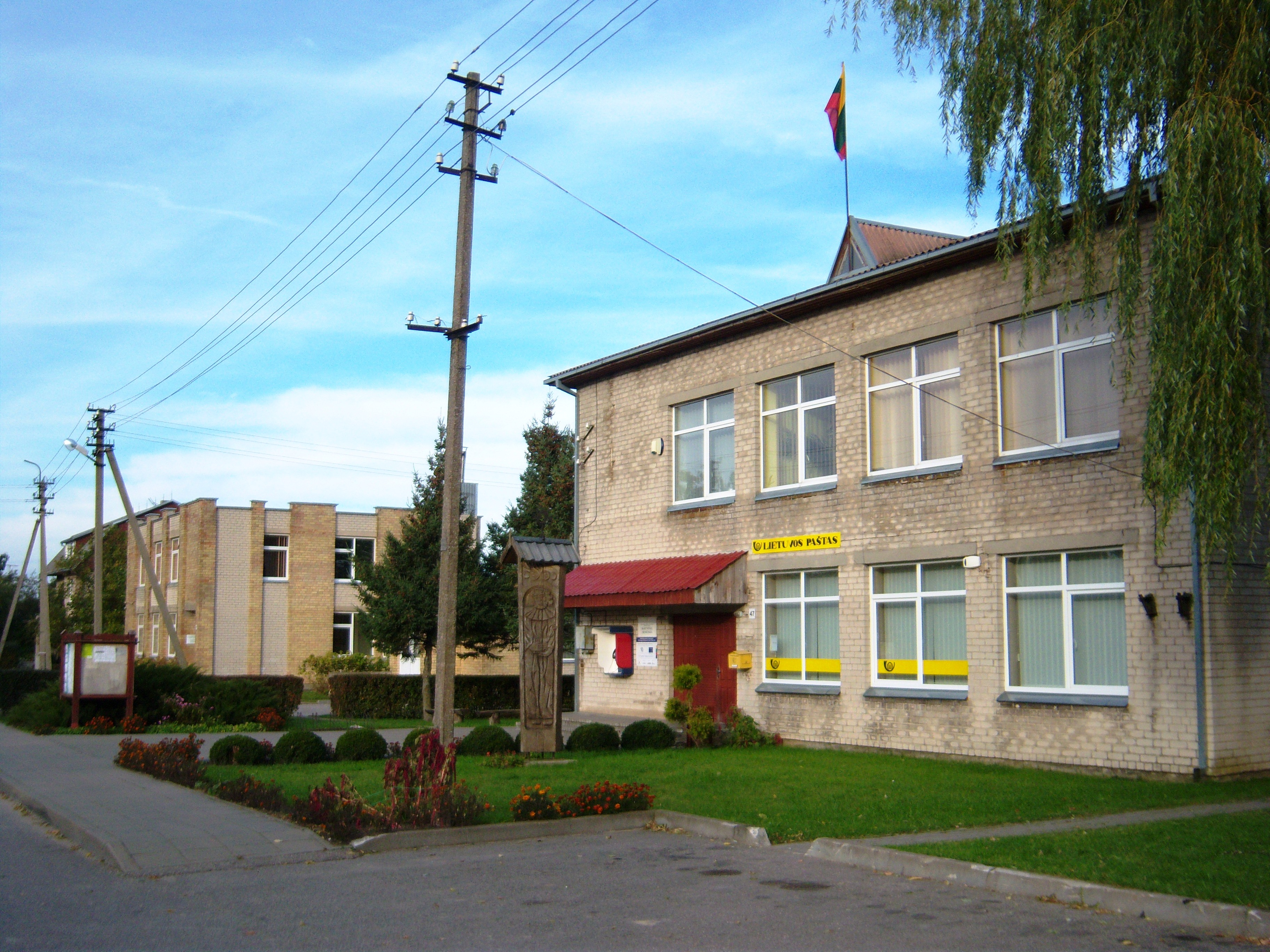

The Bartninkai Eldership (Lithuanian: Bartninkų seniūnija) is an eldership of Lithuania, located in the Vilkaviškis District Municipality. In 2021 its population was 1871.
