= Diocese of Kaišiadorys =

Latin Catholic diocese in Lithuania

Coordinates: 54°51′N 24°27′E

Diocese of Kaišiadorys Dioecesis Kaisiadorensis Vyskupija Kaišiadorių
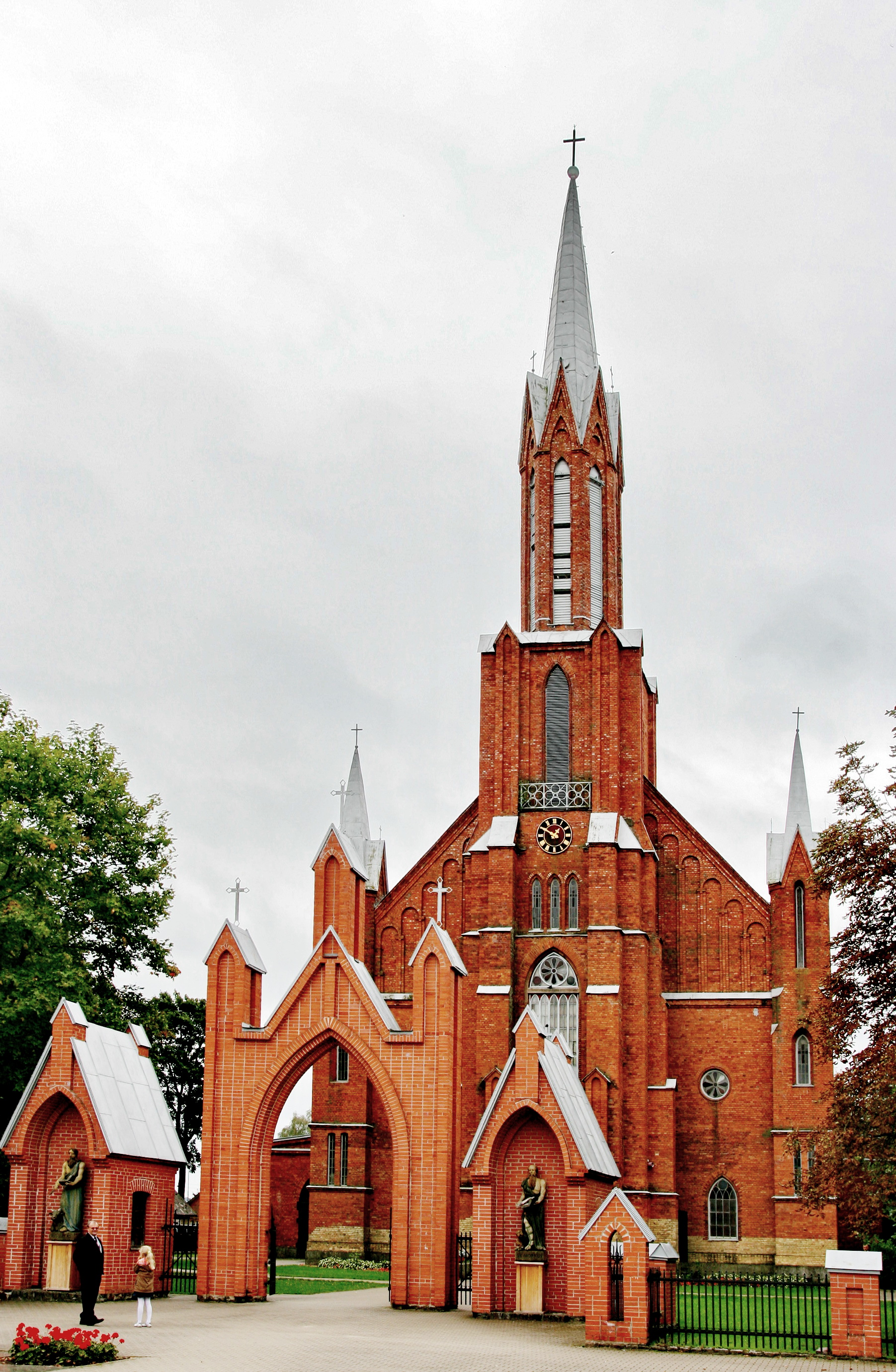
- Kaišiadorys Cathedral

Location
- Country: Lithuania
- Ecclesiastical province: Vilnius
- Metropolitan: Vilnius

Statistics
- Area: 6,557 km^{2} (2,532 sq mi)
- Population: Total; Catholics: (as of 2016); 118,000; 100,000 (84.7%)

Information
- Denomination: Catholic Church
- Sui iuris church: Latin Church
- Rite: Roman Rite
- Cathedral: Transfiguration Cathedral
- Patron saint: Saint Joseph

Current leadership
- Pope: Leo XIV
- Bishop: Jonas Ivanauskas
- Metropolitan Archbishop: Gintaras Grušas

Map
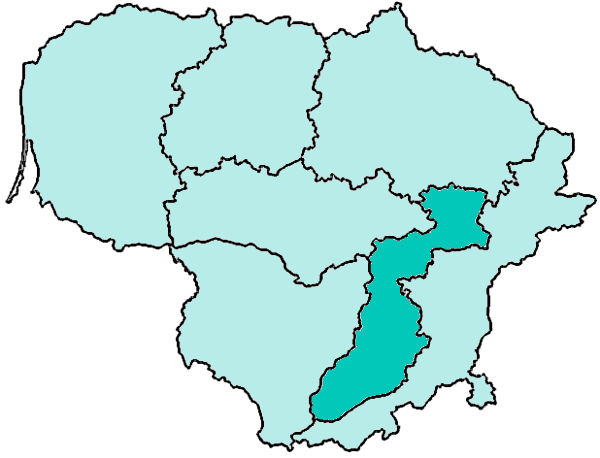
- Location of Diocese of Kaišiadorys in Lithuania

Website
- Website of the Diocese

The Diocese of Kaišiadorys (Latin: Kaisiadorensis) is a Latin Catholic diocese located in the city of Kaišiadorys in the Ecclesiastical Province of Vilnius in Lithuania. It was established on 4 April 1926 from the Metropolitan Archdiocese of Vilnius.

The diocese is the smallest in Lithuania. In 2010, it had 68 parishes in 7 deaneries. According to the 2001 census, it had about 140,000 Roman Catholics.

== Episcopal ordinaries ==
(all Roman Rite)

=== Bishops ===
1. Juozapas Kukta (5 April 1926 – 16 June 1942 Died)
2. Teofilius Matulionis (9 January 1943 – 20 August 1962 Died)
3. Juozapas Matulaitis (24 December 1991 – 11 February 2012 Retired)
4. Jonas Ivanauskas (11 February 2012 – )

=== Apostolic administrators ===
Between 1982 and 1991, Kaišiadorys was led by Apostolic Administrators rather than bishops.

- Vincentas Sladkevičius, MIC (15 July 1982 – 10 March 1989)
- Juozapas Matulaitis (10 March 1989 – 24 December 1991)

== See also ==
- List of Catholic dioceses of Lithuania
