= Teofilius Matulionis =

Lithuanian Roman Catholic prelate

Blessed The Most Reverend Teofilius Matulionis
- Archbishop of Kaišiadorys
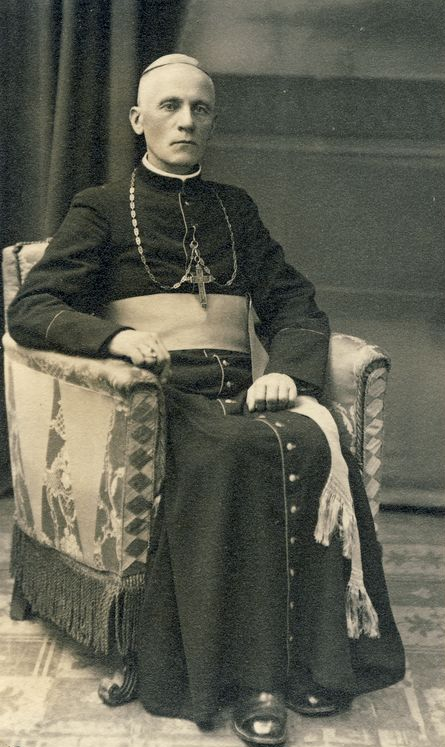
- 20 October 1933
- Church: Roman Catholic Church
- Diocese: Kaišiadorys
- See: Kaišiadorys
- Appointed: 9 January 1943
- Term ended: 20 August 1962
- Predecessor: Juozapas Kukta
- Successor: Juozas Matulaitis-Labukas
- Previous posts: Titular Bishop of Matrega (1928–1943); Auxiliary Bishop of Mohilev (1928–1943)

Orders
- Ordination: 17 March 1900
- Consecration: 9 February 1929 by Anton Malecki
- Rank: Archbishop "ad personam"

Personal details
- Born: Teofilius Matulionis; 22 June 1873 Alantos, Molėtai, Russian Empire (modern Lithuania)
- Died: 20 August 1962 (aged 89) Šeduva, Radviliškis, Lithuania

Sainthood
- Feast day: 14 June
- Venerated in: Roman Catholic Church
- Beatified: 25 June 2017; Vilnius Cathedral, Lithuania by Cardinal Angelo Amato
- Attributes: Episcopal attire
- Patronage: Persecuted Christians; Educators

Teofilius Matulionis (22 June 1873 – 20 August 1962) was a Lithuanian prelate of the Roman Catholic Church. He was consecrated a bishop in secret and spent most of his years as bishop in prison. His death was likely due to poisoning by officials of the USSR.

Pope Francis approved his beatification on 1 December 2016 and it was celebrated in Vilnius at the cathedral square on 25 June 2017.

== Life ==
Teofilius Matulionis was born on 22 June 1873 in Molėtai, a town then in the Russian Empire, now in Lithuania. He was the second of three children to Jurgis Matulionis (1833–1911) and Ona Juočepytė (1851-9 May 1877); his two brothers were Jonas (1871–1920) and Juozas (1875–1955). After his mother died, his father remarried, and he and his second wife had seven children.

Matulionis studied at Antalieptė from 1887 to 1892 and then at Daugpilis from 1892 to 1900. He graduated from high school in Latvia and began his theological studies for the priesthood in Saint Petersburg, Russia, where he was ordained on 17 March 1900. He interrupted his studies for a brief period to reconsider his vocation. He studied Russian, Latvian and Polish. He also served briefly as a curate in several Latvian parishes. He was assigned to a small parish in Latgalia, Latvia, beginning on 26 June 1900 and transferred in 1910 to the parish of the Immaculate Heart of Jesus in Saint Petersburg, where Catholicism was a minority religion. He led a campaign to construct a new parish church, and he was awarded the title Monsignor. He lived in Saint Petersburg until 1929.

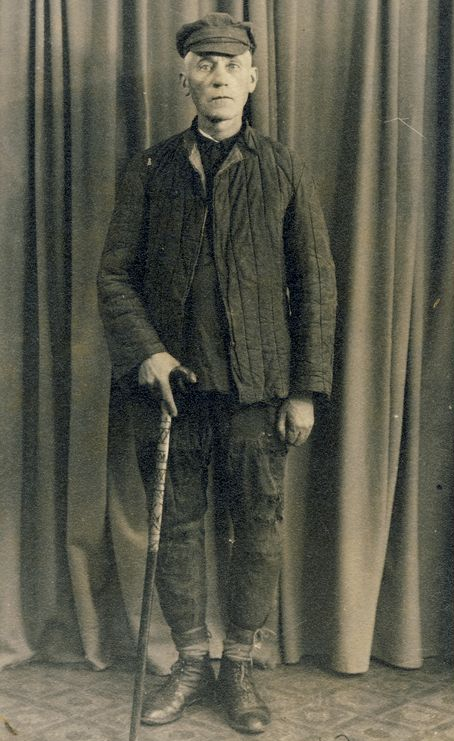
Matulionis after returning from a Soviet prison in 1933

Pope Pius XI named him an auxiliary bishop of Mohilev, Belarus, on 8 December 1928 and Matulionis received his episcopal consecration in secret on 7 February 1929 from Bishop Anton Malecki. His pastoral work was often hampered by the communist government. In 1922 the Bolsheviks ordered the confiscation of all churches. Their decree required pastors to provide their signatures. Matulionis refused and was arrested and imprisoned from 1923 until 1925, as part of the broader persecution centered on the "show trial" of Bishop Jan Cieplak. He was arrested a second time and sentenced to a decade of hard labor in the Arctic where the cold and damp climate damaged his health. He often awoke in the middle of the night to celebrate the Mass in secret using everyday bread as the Eucharist and distributing it in secret to fellow inmates when he could. The authorities relocated him to a prison in Saint Petersburg because of his health. He was placed in solitary confinement, but released in 1933 as part of a prisoner exchange when the Lithuanian government signed an accord with the Soviet Union for a ten-prisoner exchange, though he asked not to be part of the exchange.

From 1934 until 1936 he lived in the United States. He also visited Cairo and Jerusalem, and parts of Western Europe. In 1934 he met Pius XI in a private audience and the pope said to him: "It is an honor to the Lithuanian nation to have such a hero". In 1943, during World War II, Pope Pius XII made him bishop of Kaišiadorys, Lithuania. He was arrested a third time for releasing a pastoral letter in 1946 and was sentenced to another decade in prison. Upon his release in 1956, he was forbidden to exercise his role as bishop and held under house arrest in Birštonas.

On 25 December 1957, he consecrated Vincentas Sladkevičius a bishop without the consent of the communists. They ridiculed Matulionis for performing the ceremony in a small kitchen. He said they should be ashamed of forcing him to act in secret. For acting without government consent he was exiled to Šeduva, where he remained for the rest of his life. In 1962 Pope John XXIII, on the 33rd anniversary of his consecration as bishop, gave him the personal title of archbishop.

Matulionis died on 20 August 1962 not long after a routine USSR KGB check of his apartment during which he was drugged. He had previously been denied permission to attend the Second Vatican Council. The government allowed his remains to be interred in his diocesan cathedral on condition that no demonstrations occur. His remains were exhumed in 1999 and tests confirmed that he had been poisoned.

=== Posthumous honors ===
In 2003 he was granted the Life Saving Cross and in 2006 awarded the Grand Cross of the Order of the Cross of Vytis for his heroism and sacrifices.

== Beatification ==
The beatification process began under Pope John Paul II on 2 April 1990 when the Congregation for the Causes of Saints (CCS) titled him a Servant of God. The diocesan process lasted until 1 May 2008. Pope Francis confirmed on 1 December 2016 that Matulionis had died "in odium fidei" (due to hatred of the faith) and approved the beatification. Cardinal Angelo Amato, Prefect of the CSS, presided at the beatification ceremony on 25 June 2017 in Vilnius.

The current postulator for the cause of canonization is Fr. Mindaugas Sabonis.
