= Kaišiadorys =

- City
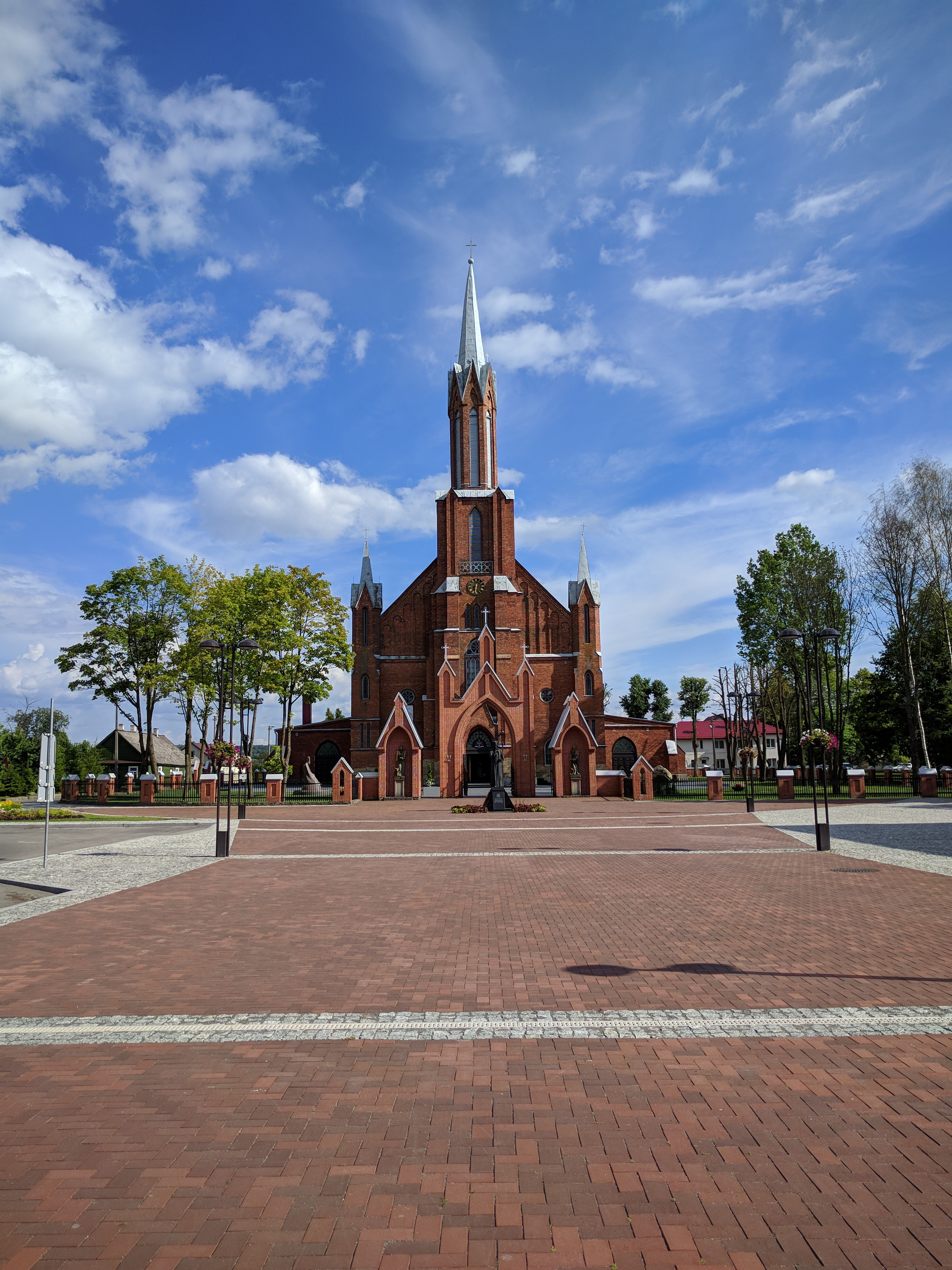
- Kaišiadorys Cathedral

- Coat of arms

- Location of Kaišiadorys
- Coordinates: 54°52′N 24°27′E
- Country: Lithuania
- Ethnographic region: Aukštaitija
- County: Kaunas County
- Municipality: Kaišiadorys district municipality
- Eldership: Kaišiadorys town eldership
- Capital of: Kaišiadorys district municipality Kaišiadorys town eldership Kaišiadorys rural eldership
- First mentioned: 1590
- Granted city rights: 1946

Population (2021)
  - Total: 8,334
- Time zone: UTC+2 (EET)
  - Summer (DST): UTC+3 (EEST)

Kaišiadorys ([kɐɪɕɛˈdôːrʲiːs]; Yiddish: קאָשעדאַר) is a city in central Lithuania. It is situated between Vilnius and Kaunas. Kaišiadorys is one of six Lithuanian diocese centres. It is home to the Cathedral of the Transfiguration of Christ built in 1932. The Lithuanian Veterinary Institute is located there.

== Etymology ==
The name of the town was first mentioned in the written sources in 1590. It is believed to originate from the name of a nobleman Chašaidaras, an ethnic Tatar, who was enlisted to the Grand Ducal Lithuanian Army in 1565. In the area of the present day town, the nobleman had some land and a mansion, referred to by his name, which later became the name of the settlement.

== History ==
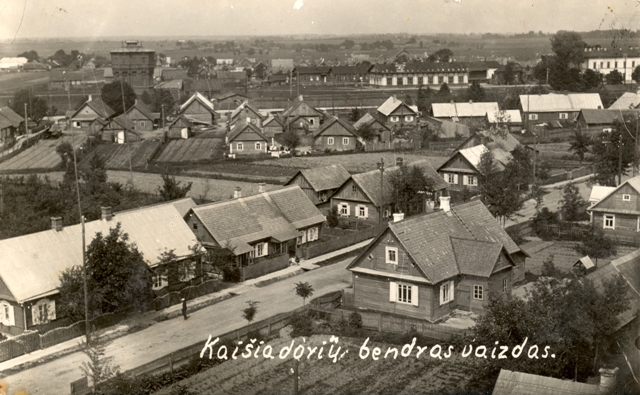
Kaišiadorys in 1937

The city expanded when a railroad connecting Vilnius with Liepāja was built in 1871. During the First World War, the town was occupied by the Germans in 1915, and it became the capital of an administrative unit for the first time. In 1919 the first train departed from Kaišiadorys to Radviliškis. When Trakai and the rest of the Vilnius Region became part of Poland, Kaišiadorys became the temporary capital of the Trakai Apskritis.

During World War II, the town was occupied by the Soviet Union from 1940, then by Nazi Germany from 1941, and then again by the Soviet Union from 1944. In August 1941, the Jewish population of the town and surroundings was murdered in mass executions perpetrated by an Einsatzgruppen of Germans and Lithuanian nationalists.

== Notable people ==
- The first President of the re-established independent Republic of Lithuania, Algirdas Brazauskas, was a pupil in Kaišiadorys in his youth; a secondary school there is named after him.
- European basketball forward Ramūnas Šiškauskas was born in Kaišiadorys.
- The first Lithuanian racing driver to compete at an international level, Kazimieras Vasiliauskas, is also from the town.

== Gallery ==
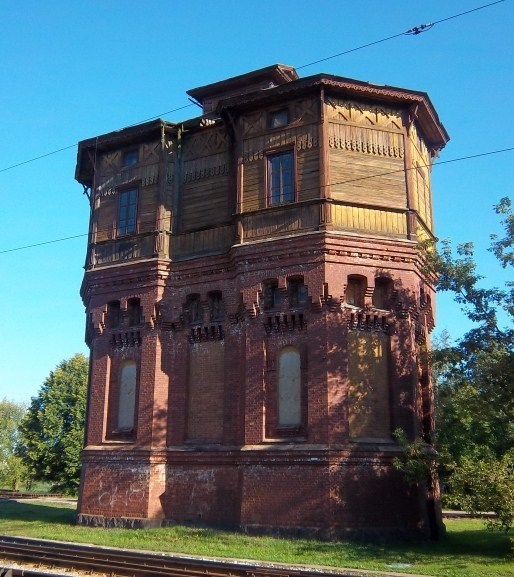
Old water stop, built in 1883

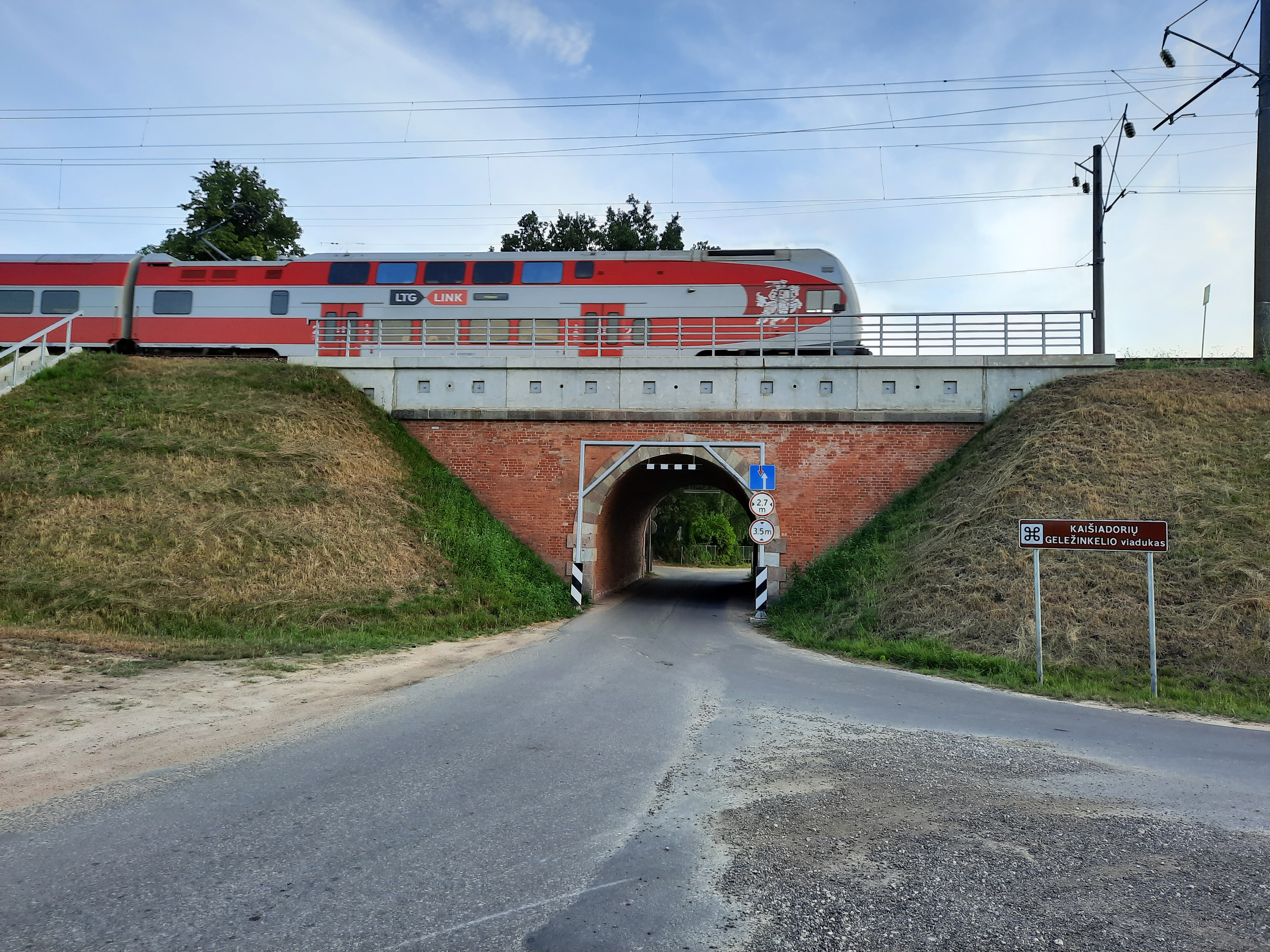
Viaduct, northern side

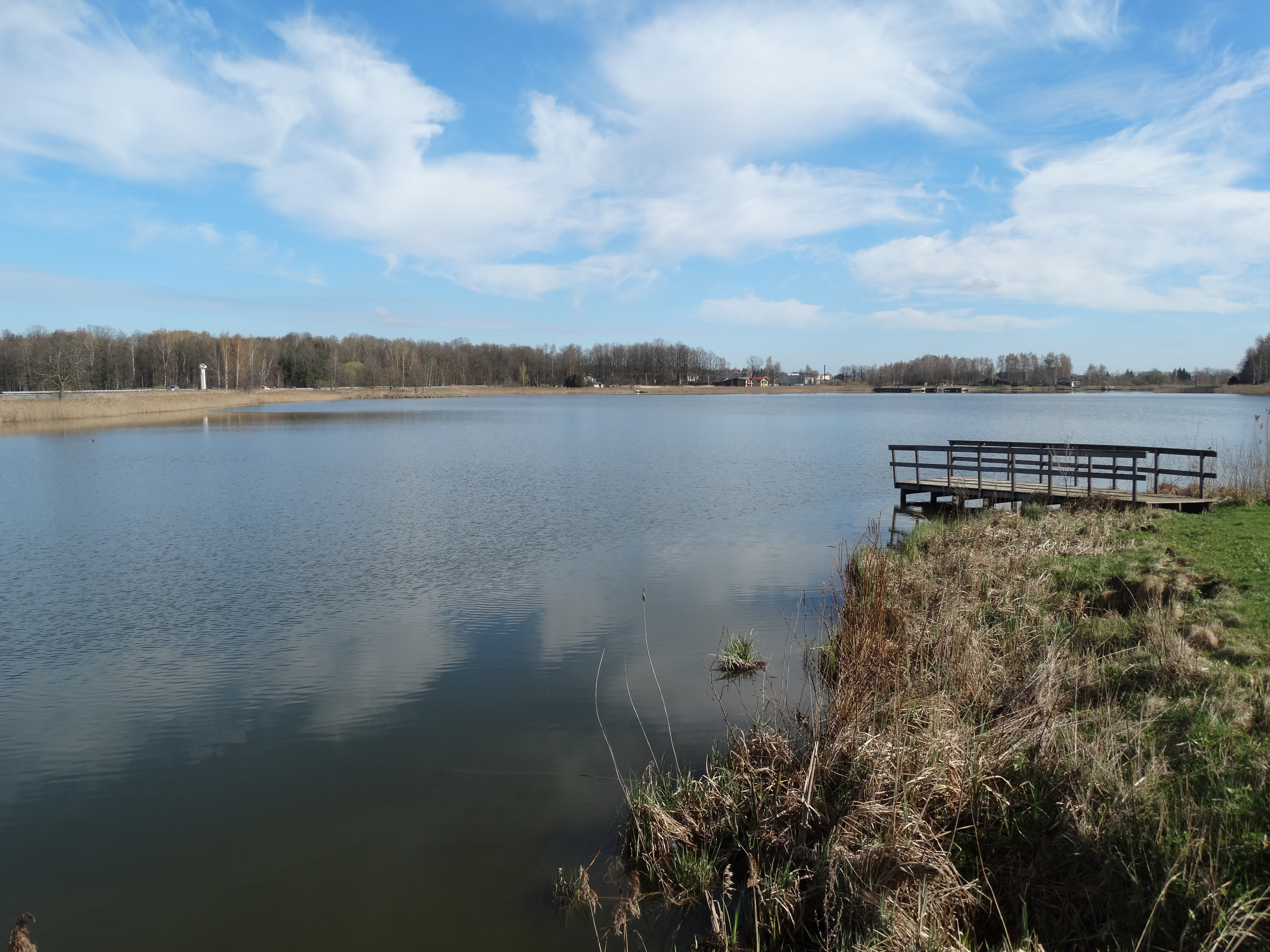
Girelė pond
