= List of Catholic pilgrimage sites in Lithuania =

There are many Catholic pilgrimage sites in Lithuania. There is no official list or designation of the sites. The government established the Pilgrim Route of John Paul II (16 sites) in 2007 though there are many more sites that attract local pilgrims. There are many sites visited by residents of the same parish or deanery, or sites that saw their devotion diminish through the years. Priest Robertas Gedvydas Skrinskas in his 1999 guide to pilgrimage sites counted more than 100 Marian images that are considered miraculous and 25 sites of Marian apparitions. As of 2013, there were 33 Lourdes grottoes in Lithuania, mainly in Samogitia. The list below includes only the key sites that continue to be visited by pilgrims.

== History ==
Catholic pilgrimage sites in Lithuania started developing in the 17th century. Such delayed development was caused by the late Christianization of Lithuania in 1387 and the slow adoption of Christianity among the population that still worshiped pagan gods. The first known pilgrimage took place in 1604 when Bishop Benedykt Woyna organized a Jesuit pilgrimage from Vilnius to the Mother of God of Trakai. Šiluva became a pilgrimage destination after a Marian apparition in 1608—the only recognized apparition in Lithuania. The first cavalries in Žemaičių Kalvarija and Verkiai (Vilnius) were built in 1637–1642 and 1662–1669. Vilnius attracted pilgrims not only with the Calvary, but also with the relics of Saint Casimir in Vilnius Cathedral (dedicated Chapel of Saint Casimir was completed in 1636) and Our Lady of the Gate of Dawn (dedicated chapel was completed in 1671). Many pilgrims traveled not to visit specific sites but to get an indulgence during parish festivals (Lithuanian: atlaidai).

During the Soviet anti-religious campaign in 1958–1964, the authorities of the Lithuanian SSR took active measures to hinder the pilgrims and destroy several pilgrimage sites – chapels of Verkiai and Vepriai Calvaries were demolished while crosses were removed from the Hill of Crosses. After the Lithuania regained independence in 1990, many sites were repaired or reconstructed or new chapels were built (e.g. Janoniai Chapel and Kvintiškės Chapel at the sites of Marian apparitions in 1962 and 1967). In 1993, during his visit to Lithuania, Pope John Paul II visited several key pilgrimage sites, including the Gate of Dawn, Hill of Crosses, and Šiluva. In 2007, for the 15th anniversary of his visit, Lithuanian bishops and Lithuanian government established a pilgrim route of Pope John Paul II with 14 sites; two more sites were added in 2009. The route includes Šiauliai Cathedral and Christ's Resurrection Church, Kaunas due to their architectural and historical significance. In 2013, several Municipalities of Lithuania established several routes inspired by Camino de Santiago (St. James Way) that connect different churches of St. James in different regions of Lithuania.

== List ==
Catholic pilgrimage sites in Lithuania based on list by Darius Liutikas
Site	Significance	Reason for pilgrimage	Coordinates	Near town/city	Municipality	Diocese	Image
Beržoras Catholic Church	Regional	Marian image; Calvary	56°1′31″N 21°48′46″E	Beržoras	Plungė District Municipality	Diocese of Telšiai	
Gate of Dawn	International	Marian image (Our Lady of the Gate of Dawn)	54°40′28″N 25°17′22″E	Vilnius	Vilnius City Municipality	Archdiocese of Vilnius	
Hill of Crosses	International	Crosses	56°00′55″N 23°25′00″E	Šiauliai	Šiauliai District Municipality	Diocese of Šiauliai	
Janoniai Chapel	Regional	Marian apparition	55°23′13″N 25°12′46″E	Skiemonys	Molėtai District Municipality	Diocese of Panevėžys	
Kaunas Cathedral	Regional	Marian image	54°53′49″N 23°53′20″E	Kaunas	Kaunas City Municipality	Archdiocese of Kaunas	
Kazokiškės Catholic Church	Regional	Marian image	54°49′00″N 24°50′25″E	Kazokiškės	Trakai District Municipality	Archdiocese of Vilnius	
Keturnaujiena Chapel	National	Marian apparition	54°51′1″N 22°54′37″E	Keturnaujiena	Šakiai District Municipality	Diocese of Vilkaviškis	
Krekenava Basilica	Regional	Marian image	55°32′45″N 24°5′52″E	Krekenava	Panevėžys District Municipality	Diocese of Panevėžys	
Kryžiai Chapel	Regional	Marian image; crosses	54°15′38″N 23°41′38″E	Šventežeris	Lazdijai District Municipality	Diocese of Vilkaviškis	
Kvintiškės Chapel	Regional	Marian apparition	55°48′10″N 26°5′1″E	Inbradas	Zarasai District Municipality	Diocese of Panevėžys	
Linkuva Catholic Church	Regional	Marian image	56°5′5″N 23°58′30″E	Linkuva	Pakruojis District Municipality	Diocese of Šiauliai	
Marijampolė Basilica	Regional	Blessed Jurgis Matulaitis	54°33′19″N 23°20′39″E	Marijampolė	Marijampolė Municipality	Diocese of Vilkaviškis	
Mažučiai Spring	Regional	Marian apparition; spring	54°42′18″N 23°07′05″E	Alksnėnai	Vilkaviškis District Municipality	Diocese of Vilkaviškis	
Pažaislis Monastery	Regional	Marian image	54°52′34″N 24°1′19″E	Kaunas	Kaunas City Municipality	Archdiocese of Kaunas	
Pivašiūnai Catholic Church	National	Marian image	54°27′39″N 24°22′20″E	Pivašiūnai	Alytus District Municipality	Diocese of Kaišiadorys	
Sanctuary of the Divine Mercy	International	Christological image (Divine Mercy image)	54°40′53″N 25°17′08″E	Vilnius	Vilnius City Municipality	Archdiocese of Vilnius	
Šiluva Basilica	National	Marian image (Our Lady of Šiluva)	55°31′49″N 23°13′29″E	Šiluva	Raseiniai District Municipality	Archdiocese of Kaunas	
Šiluva Chapel	National	Marian apparition	55°31′50″N 23°13′11″E	Šiluva	Raseiniai District Municipality	Archdiocese of Kaunas	
Telšiai Cathedral	Regional	Bishops Justinas Staugaitis and Vincentas Borisevičius	55°58′56″N 22°14′47″E	Telšiai	Telšiai District Municipality	Diocese of Telšiai	
Trakai Catholic Church	Regional	Marian image (Mother of God of Trakai)	54°38′34″N 24°56′4″E	Trakai	Trakai District Municipality	Archdiocese of Vilnius	
Tytuvėnai Monastery	Regional	Calvary	55°35′48″N 23°12′01″E	Tytuvėnai	Kelmė District Municipality	Diocese of Šiauliai	
Vepriai Calvary	Regional	Calvary	55°9′00″N 24°34′32″E	Vepriai	Ukmergė District Municipality	Archdiocese of Kaunas	
Verkiai Calvary	Regional	Calvary	54°43′51″N 25°17′14″E	Vilnius	Vilnius City Municipality	Archdiocese of Vilnius	
Vilnius Cathedral	International	Marian image; Saint Casimir	54°41′09″N 25°17′16″E	Vilnius	Vilnius City Municipality	Archdiocese of Vilnius	
Žemaičių Kalvarija	National	Marian image; Calvary	56°6′36″N 22°0′38″E	Žemaičių Kalvarija	Plungė District Municipality	Diocese of Telšiai	
