= Parish festival =

Annual Roman Catholic festival

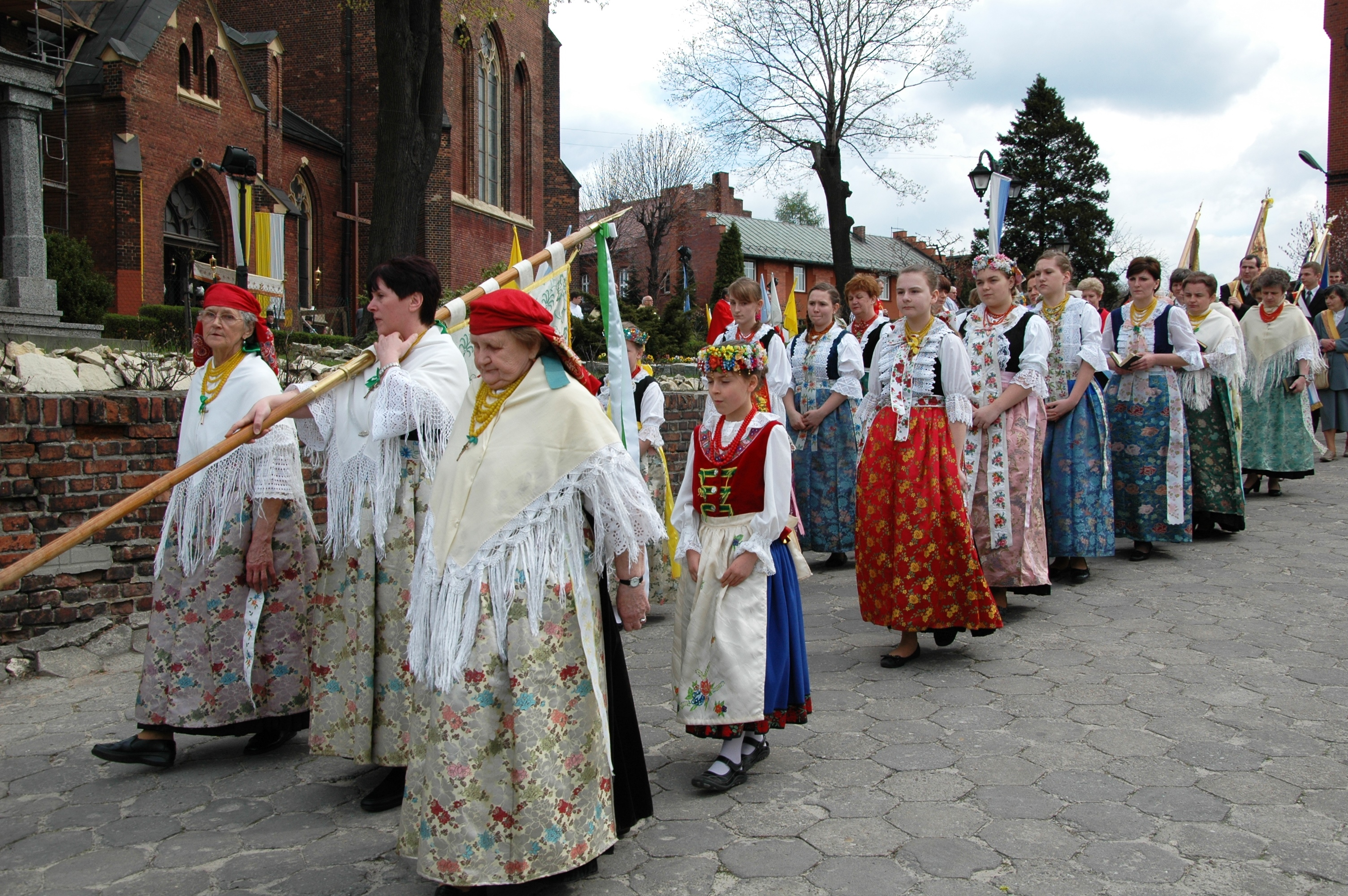
A procession in Poland

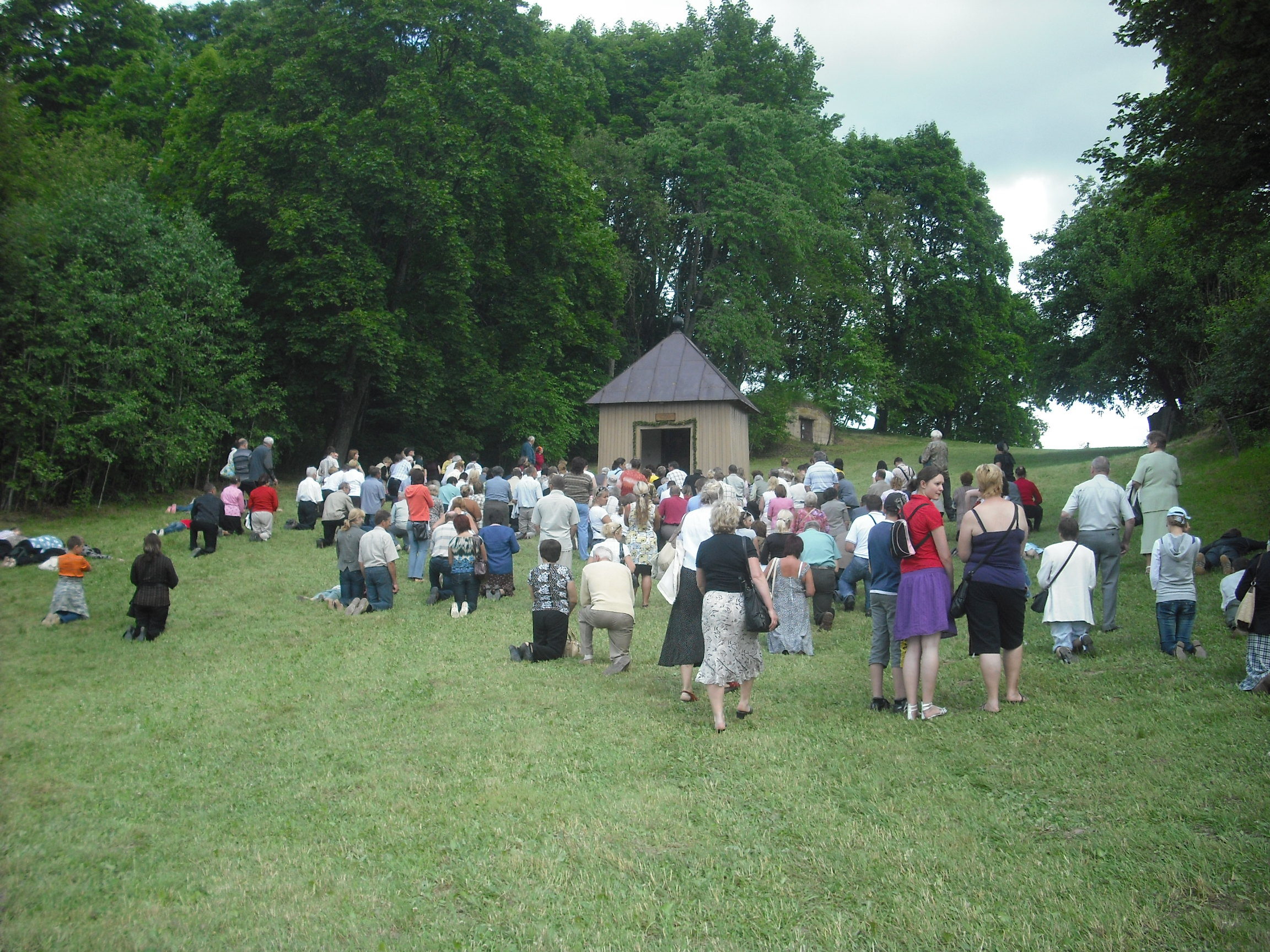
People praying in Lithuania

A parish festival or parish fair or indulgence feast (Lithuanian: atlaidai; Polish: odpust parafialny) is a local annual festival held by Roman Catholic churches in Poland and Lithuania on a feast day of the patron saint of a given parish. Many of the festivals have long historic traditions that date back to the Counter-Reformation in the 16–17th centuries. Almost every parish has such festival with some churches having several. Participants in these festivals can receive indulgences for themselves and their dead relatives. The festivals include masses, religious processions, performances by church choirs, other music performances and are often accompanied by traditional craft markets. The feasts reinforce local identity and foster a sense of community. Some of the larger festivals, like the Great Žemaičių Kalvarija Festival, last for a week, attract thousands of people, and are major pilgrimage events.

Major parish festivals in Lithuania:

- Of the Visitation of the Blessed Virgin Mary in Žemaičių Kalvarija in July (see the Great Žemaičių Kalvarija Festival)
- Of the Assumption of the Blessed Virgin Mary in Pivašiūnai and Krekenava in August
- Of the Nativity of the Blessed Virgin Mary in Šiluva in September
- Of Our Lady of the Gate of Dawn in Vilnius in November
- Of Saints Peter and Paul in Vilnius in June
- Of Our Lady of Trakai in Trakai in September

== See also ==
Media related to odpust parafialny at Wikimedia Commons
