= Hill of Crosses =

Pilgrimage site in northern Lithuania

- Kryžių kalnas (Lithuanian)
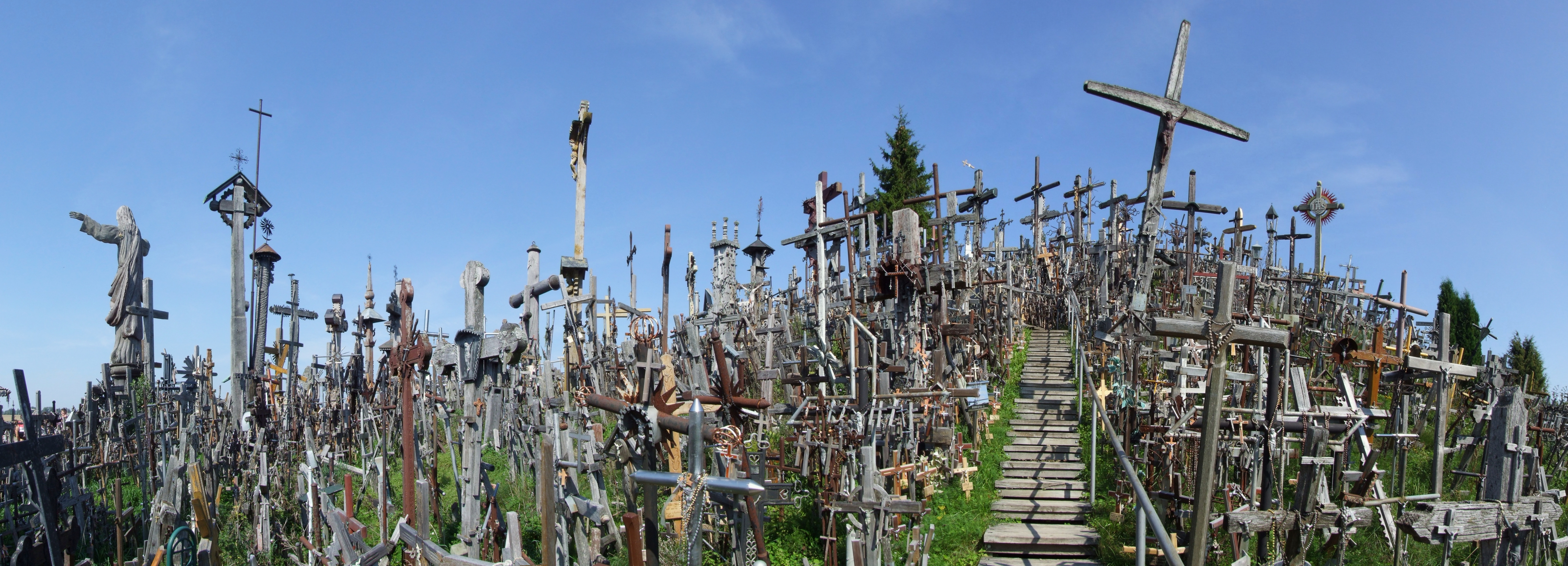
- Close view of the Hill of Crosses

- Location within Lithuania
- 56°00′55″N 23°25′00″E
- Type: Pilgrimage site
- Location: Meškuičiai Eldership, Šiauliai District Municipality, Lithuania
- Nearest city: Šiauliai

History
- Founded: c. 1831

Site notes
- Area: 0.46 hectares (1.1 acres)
- Governing body: Order of Friars Minor of the Lithuanian Franciscan Province of St. Casimir
- Visitors: 324,357 (in 2019)

Cultural Monuments of Lithuania
- Type: National
- Designated: May 19, 1998
- Reference no.: 3295

Hill of Crosses (Lithuanian: Kryžių kalnas) is a site of pilgrimage about 12 km (7.5 mi) north of the city of Šiauliai, in northern Lithuania. The precise origin of the practice of leaving crosses on the hill is uncertain, but it is believed that the first crosses were placed on the former Jurgaičiai or Domantai hill fort after the 1831 Uprising. Over the generations, not only crosses and crucifixes, but statues of the Virgin Mary, carvings of Lithuanian patriots and thousands of tiny effigies and rosaries have been brought here by Catholic pilgrims. The exact number of crosses is unknown, but estimates put it at about 55,000 in 1990 and 100,000 in 2006. It is a major site of Catholic pilgrimage in Lithuania.

== History ==
=== Early history ===
Over the generations, the place has come to signify the peaceful endurance of Lithuanian people despite the threats they faced throughout history. After the 3rd partition of the Polish–Lithuanian Commonwealth in 1795, Lithuania became part of the Russian Empire. Poles and Lithuanians unsuccessfully rebelled against Russian authorities in 1831 and 1863. These two uprisings are connected with the beginnings of the hill: as families could not locate bodies of perished rebels, they started putting up symbolic crosses at the site of a former hill fort.

Number of crosses
1900	130
1902	155
1922	50
1938	over 400
1961	5,000 (destroyed)
1975	1,200 (destroyed)
1990	~55,000
2006	over 100,000

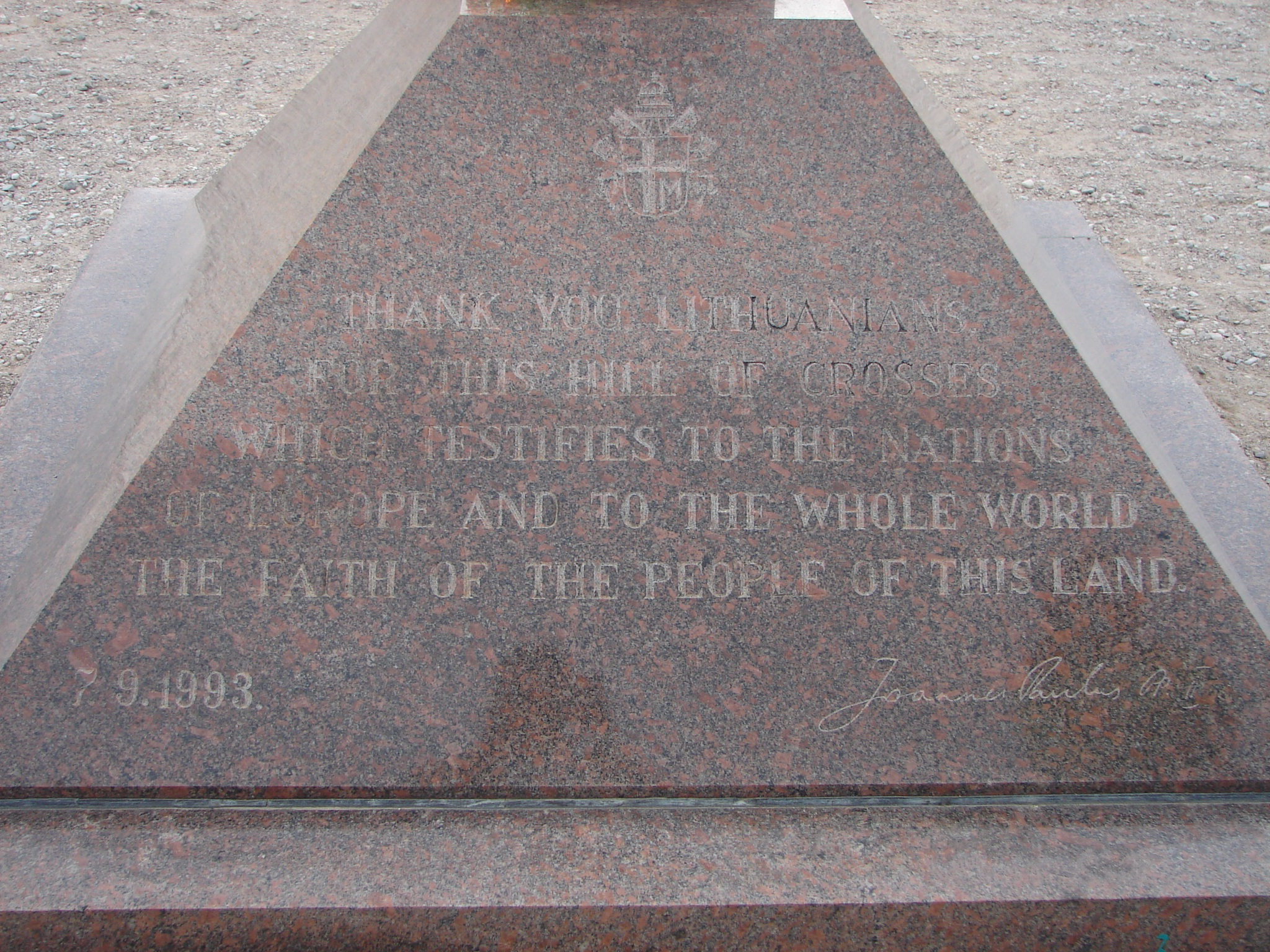
A stone inscribed with the words of Pope John Paul II: "Thank you, Lithuanians, for this Hill of Crosses which testifies to the nations of Europe and to the whole world the faith of the people of this land."

=== Independent Lithuania (1918–1939) ===
When the old political structure of Eastern Europe fell apart in 1918, Lithuania once again declared its independence. Throughout this time, the Hill of Crosses was used as a place for Lithuanians to pray for peace, for their country, and for the loved ones they had lost during the Wars of Independence.

=== Soviet occupation (1944–1990) ===
The Lithuanian public was subject to religious persecution during the Soviet occupation from 1944 to 1990. Many of these endeavors included the persecution of clergy members, anti-religious propaganda, and the prohibition of religious teachings. As a continuation of their ancestors, the Lithuanian populace continued to safeguard their religious freedoms, this encompassing the Hill of Crosses. Visitors would carry crosses with them, either to commemorate their loved ones, offer prayers for better health or success, or as a tribute to significant historical events.

However, during this period, the Hill of Crosses signified the public's opposition to Soviet suppression. This contradicted the prevailing Soviet ideology of the era. The members of the Soviet KGB recognized this, resulting in prolonged efforts to destroy the landmark and prevent new emergences of crosses. Despite the peaceful resistance, the Soviets bulldozed the site three separate times, and there were rumors that authorities planned on flooding the area.The Soviets used other numerous tactics to deter the public from visiting the hill, such as deeming the crosses had no artistic value, blocking roads from visitors, and guarding of the hill by the KGB and Soviet army. The Soviets would apprehend anyone bringing crosses to the hill, usually resulting in penalties and incarceration. Despite these efforts to destroy the landmark, the Lithuanian public continued to bring crosses to the hill every night, risking harsh punishment.

=== Recent events ===
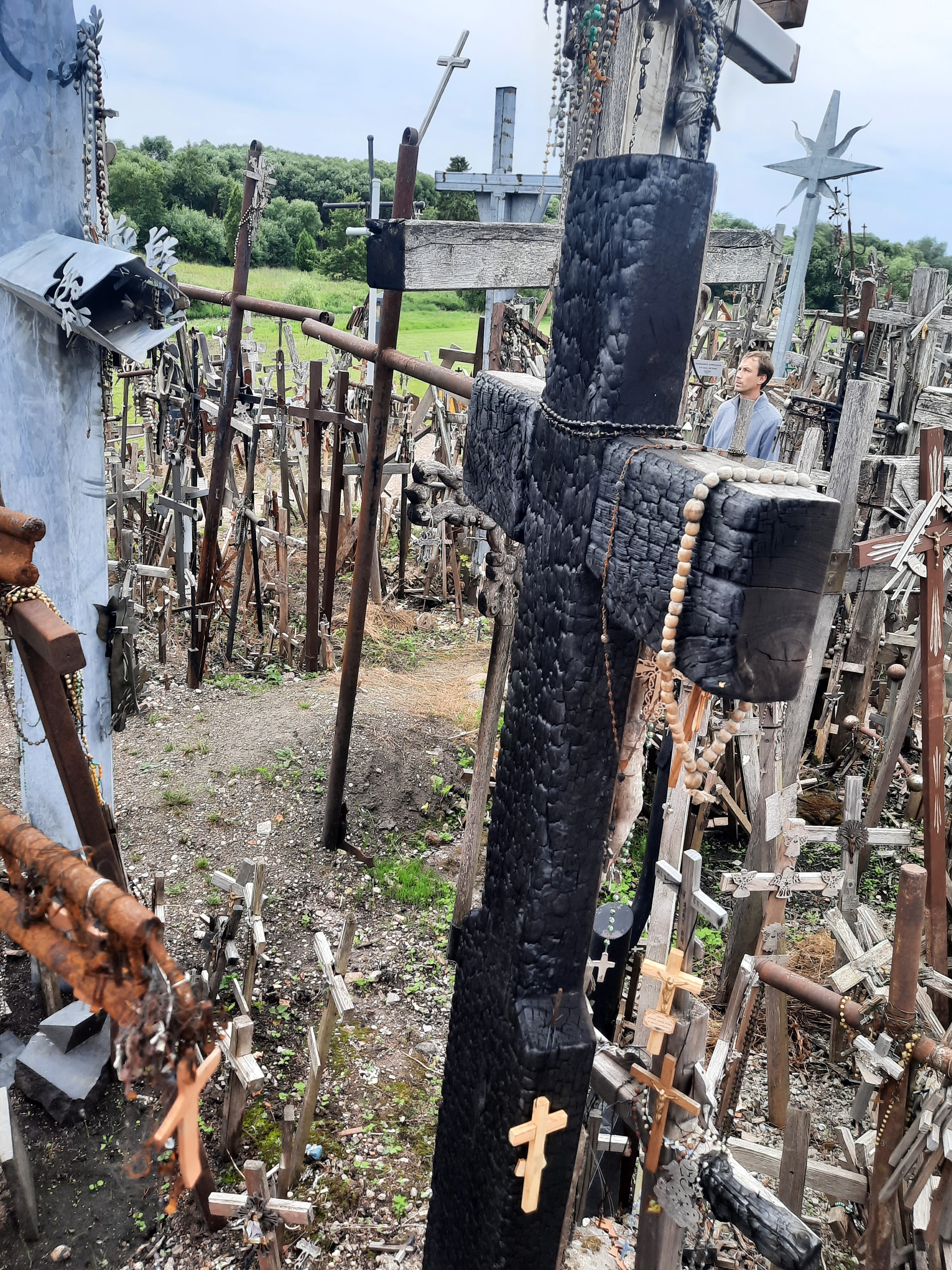
Hill of crosses after fire in 2021

In May 2013, Šiauliai District Municipality adopted rules regarding the placement of crosses. People are allowed to erect wooden crosses less than 3 metres (9.8 ft) in height with no permits. In December 2019, a tourist from China removed and tossed away a cross believed to be set up by the Hong Kong pro-democracy camp. She later condemned the protesters in a Twitter post and in an Instagram video saying, "We have done a good thing today. Our motherland is great." Lithuanian Foreign Minister Linas Linkevičius condemned the woman's action in a tweet that called it a "shameful, disgraceful act of vandalism" and said such behavior "can't and won't be tolerated".

== Significance ==
After the dissolution of the Soviet Union in 1990, the practice of Lithuanian cross-crafting became very popular. Visitors were able to make crosses out of small twigs and rocks and tie them together with grass, in order to show their support. Due to the symbolism of cross-crafting during the Soviet occupation, UNESCO named Lithuanian cross-crafting in the lists of good safeguarding practices and intangible cultural heritage. The hill stood as a testament to the Lithuanian people's determination to preserve their religious and national identity during these times. As a result, in the post-Soviet years, the number of crosses exploded. Free from religious oppression, the Lithuanian public was able to practice their religious beliefs without fear of persecution. Due to its religious significance, it became a site of catholic pilgrimage. On September 7, 1993, Pope John Paul II visited the Hill of Crosses, declaring it a place for hope, peace, love, and sacrifice. In 2000, a Franciscan hermitage was opened nearby. The interior decoration draws links with La Verna, the mountain where St. Francis is said to have received his stigmata.

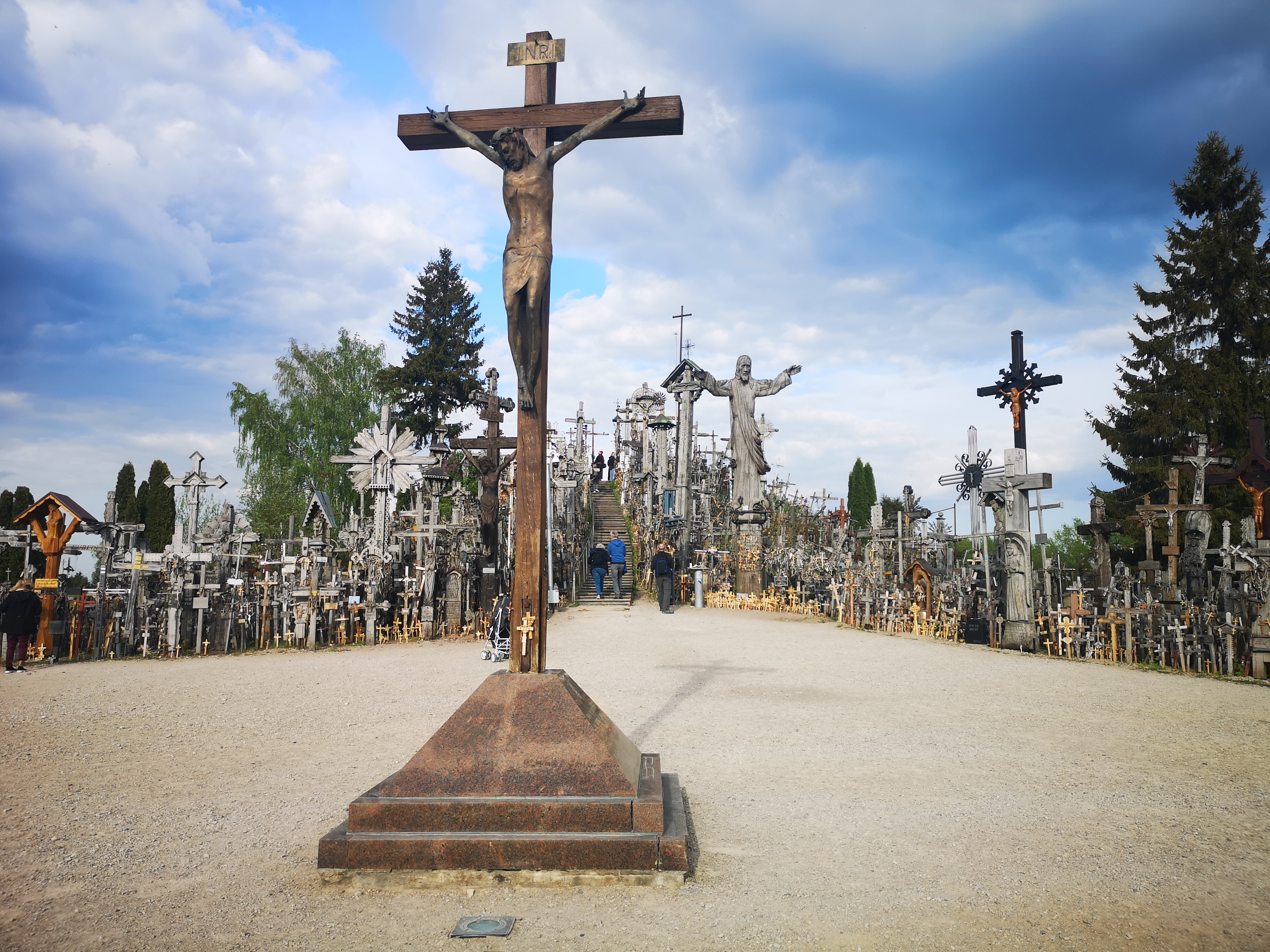

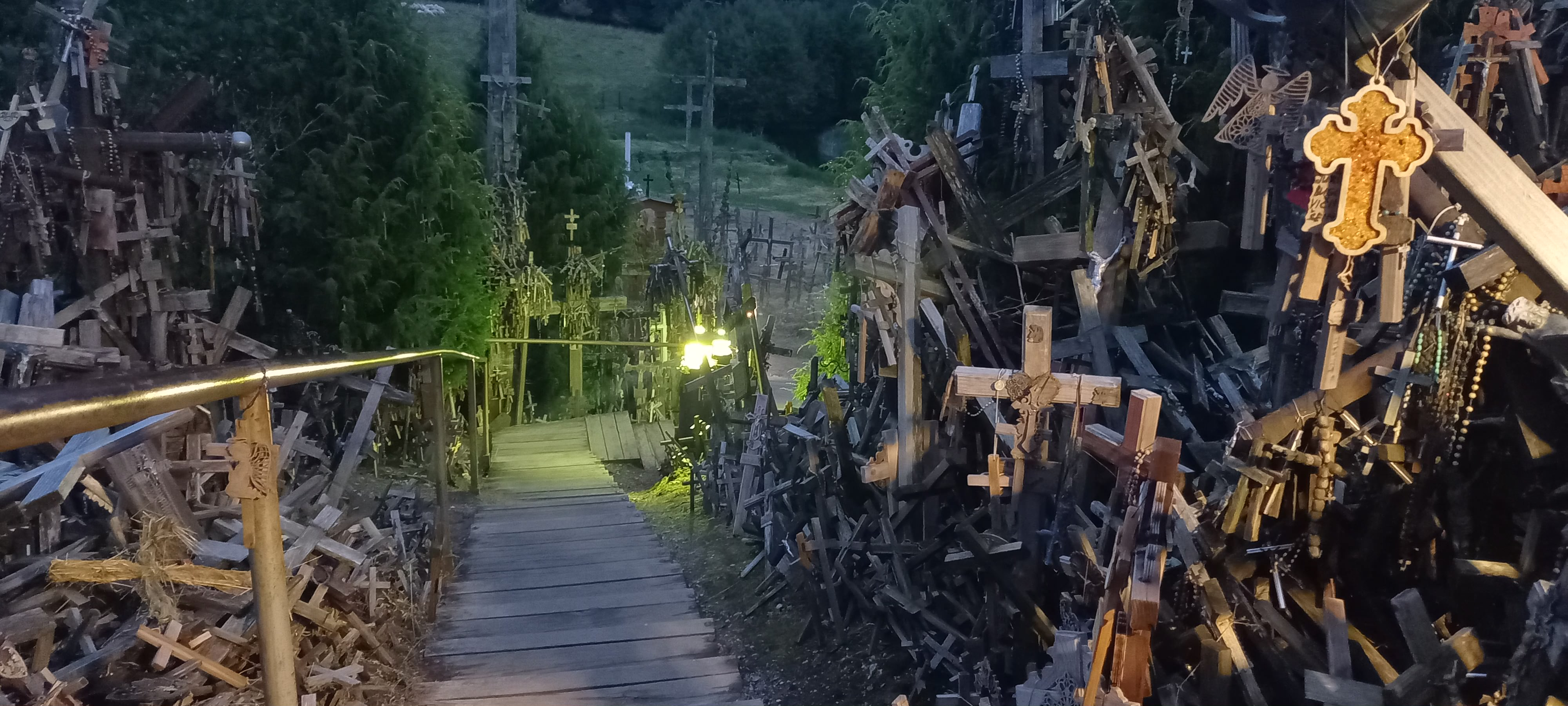
Hill of crosses at night in 2022

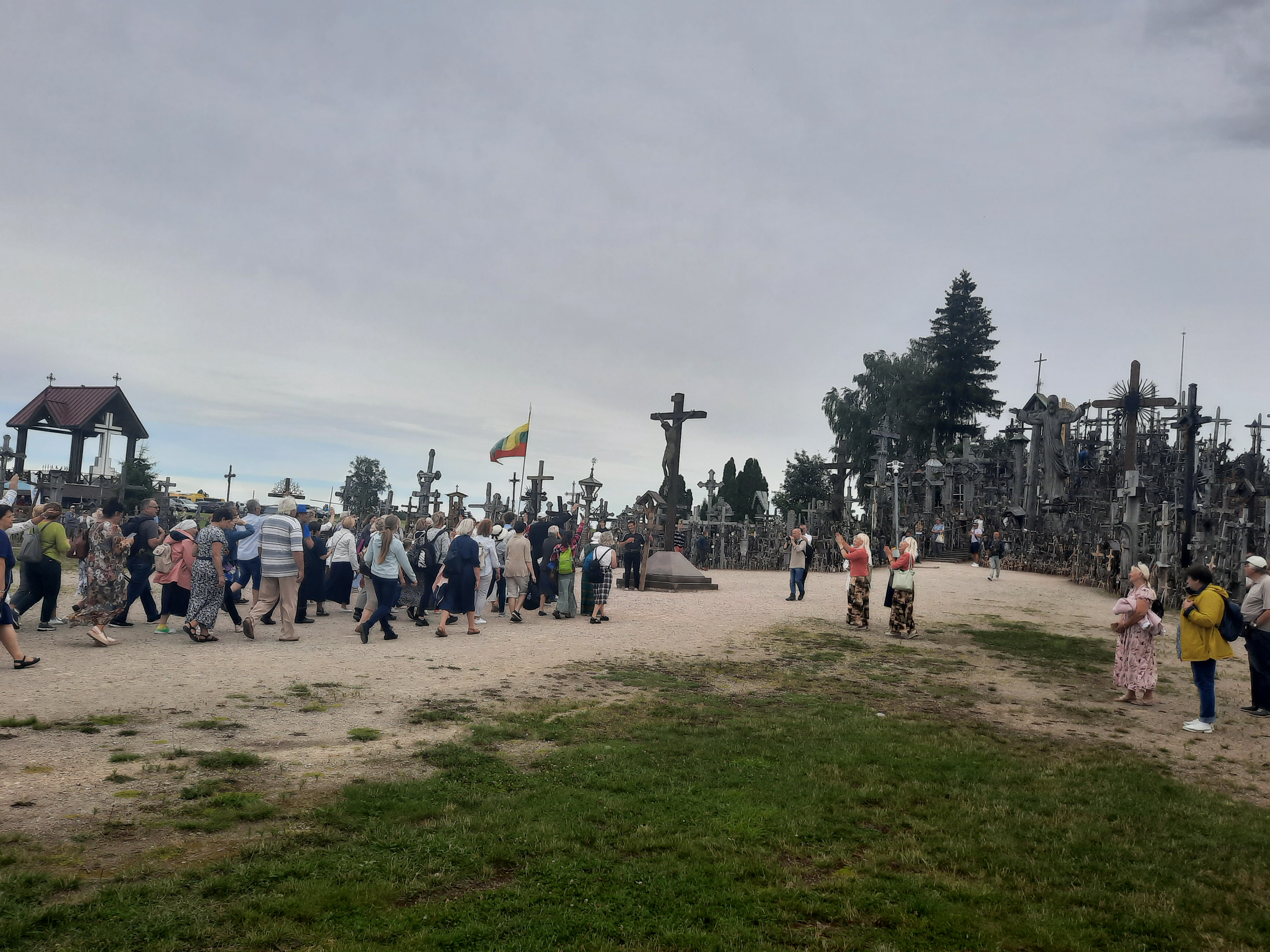
Pilgrims travel to the Hill of crosses

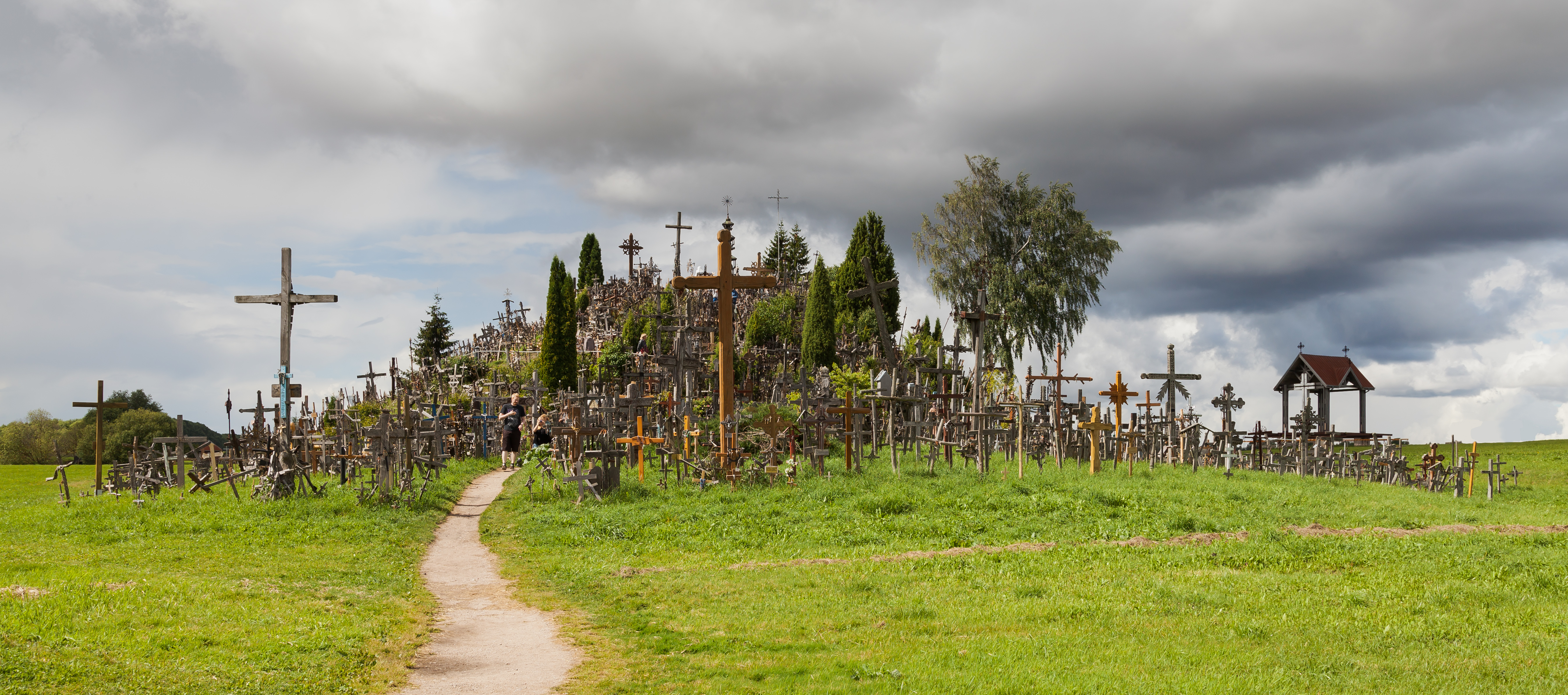
General view of the Hill of Crosses

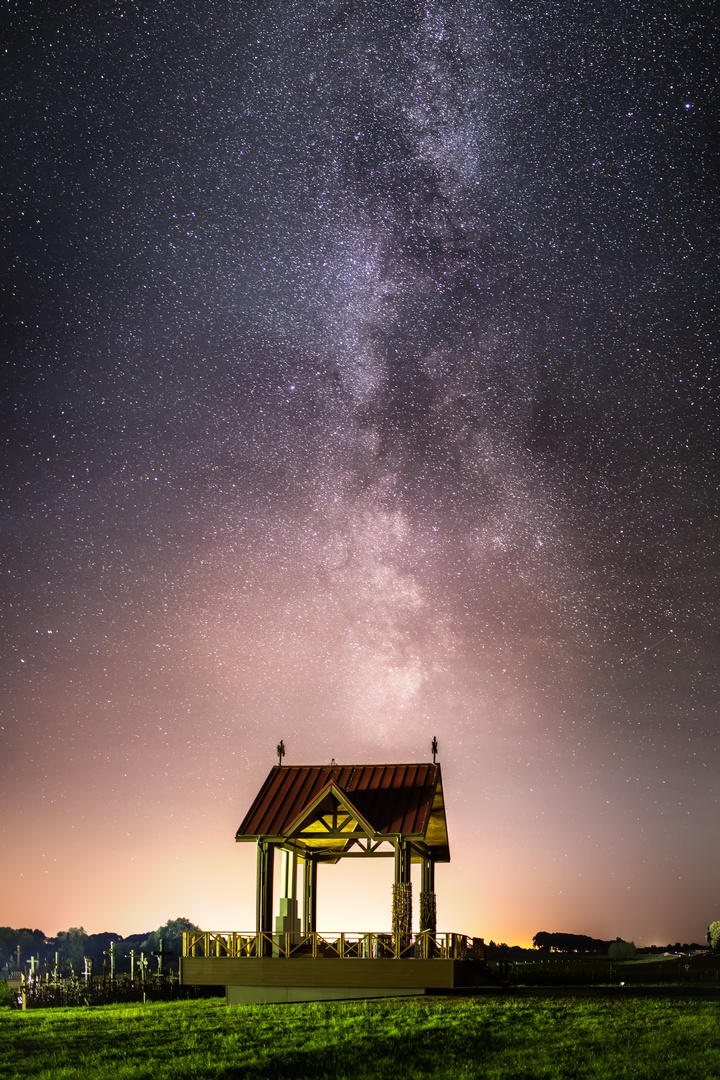
Chapel

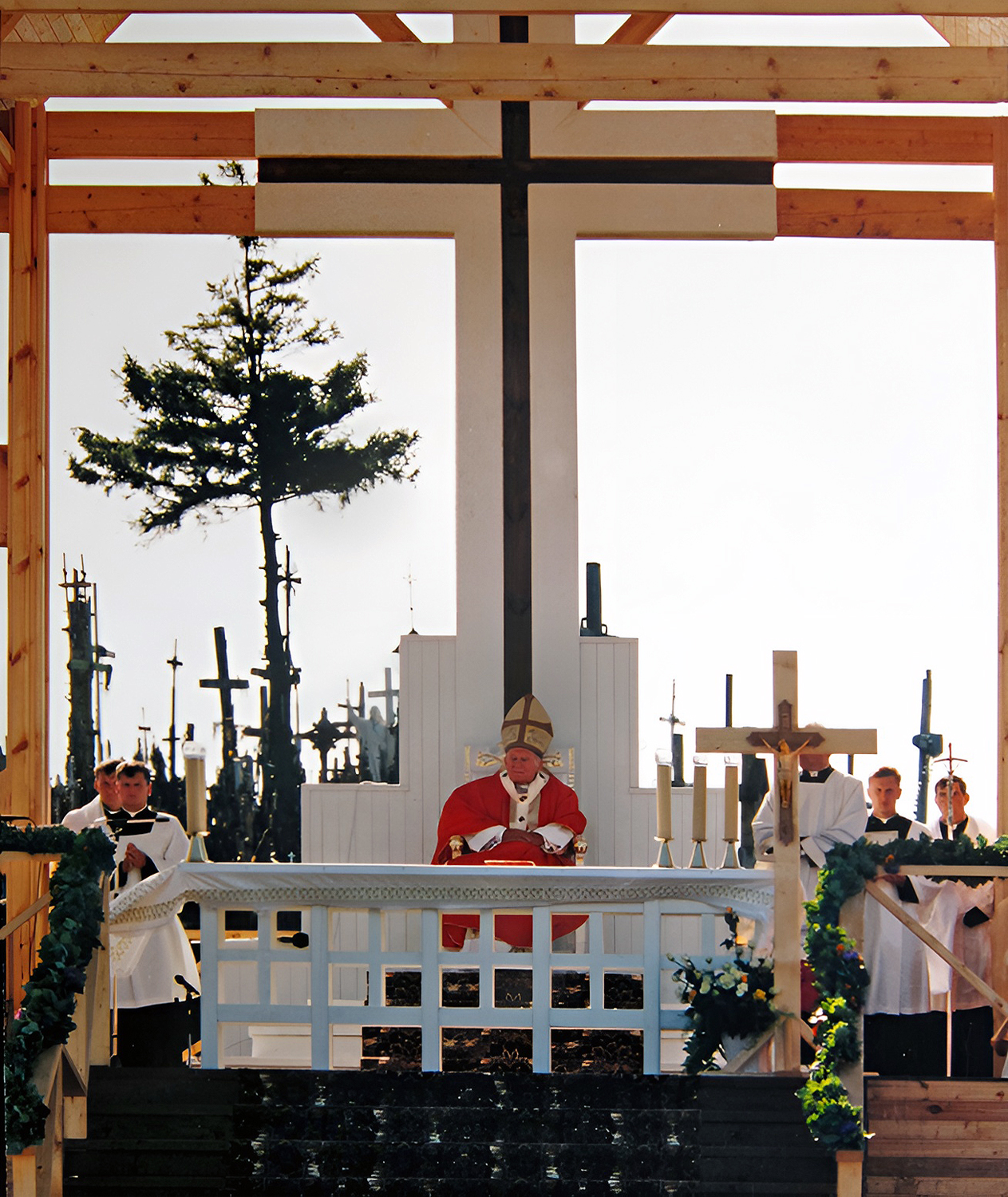
Pope John Paul II

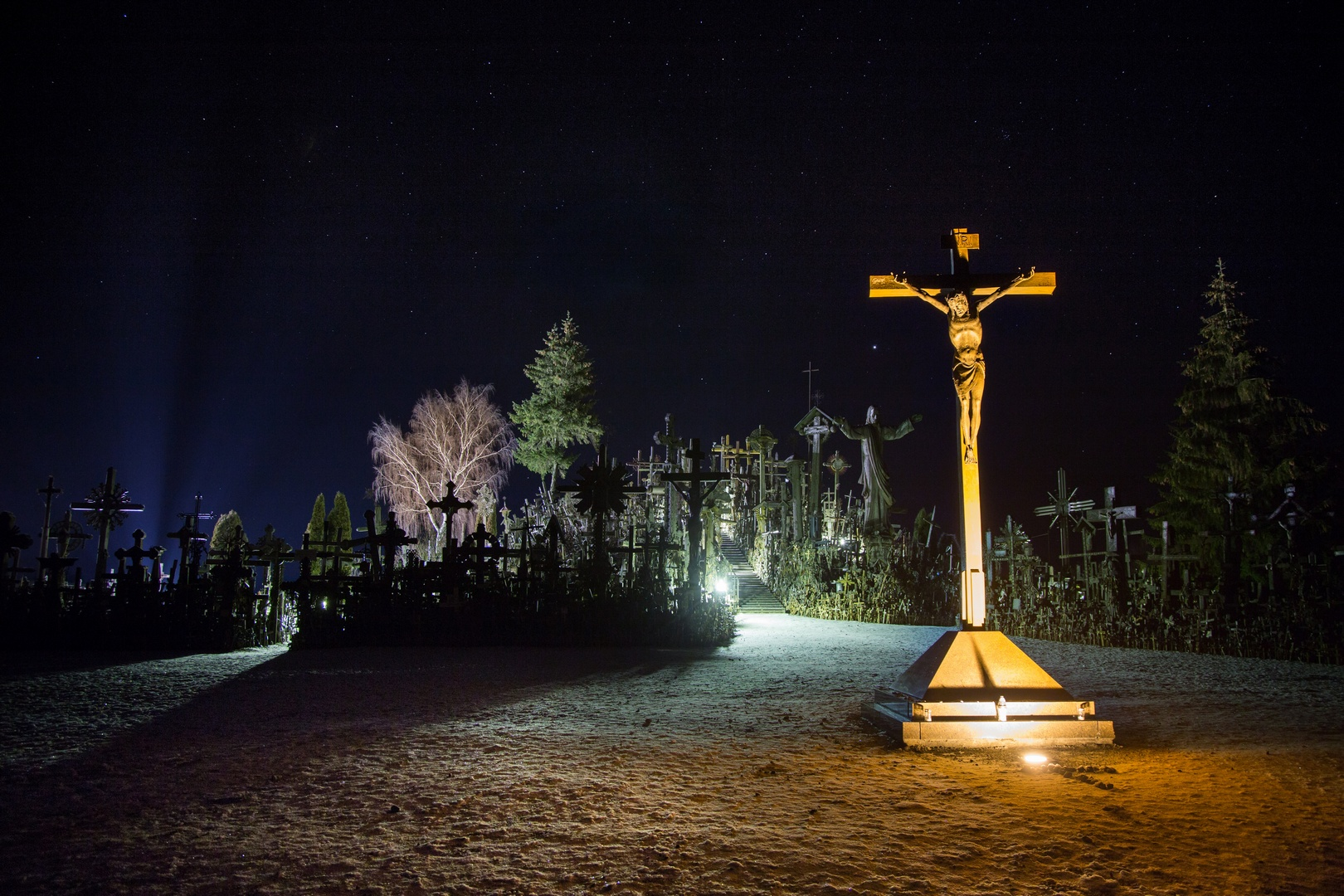
Hill of Crosses at night

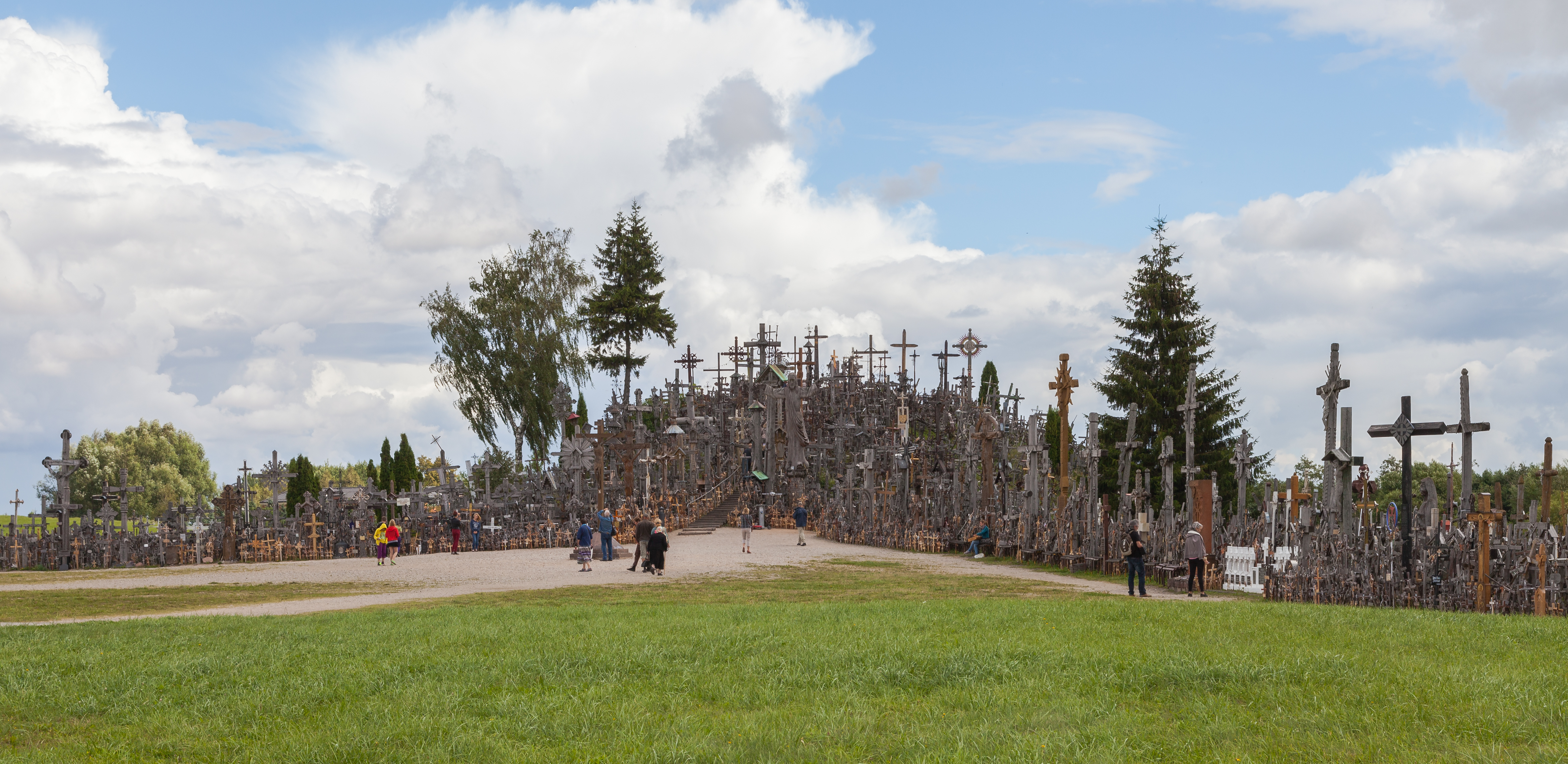

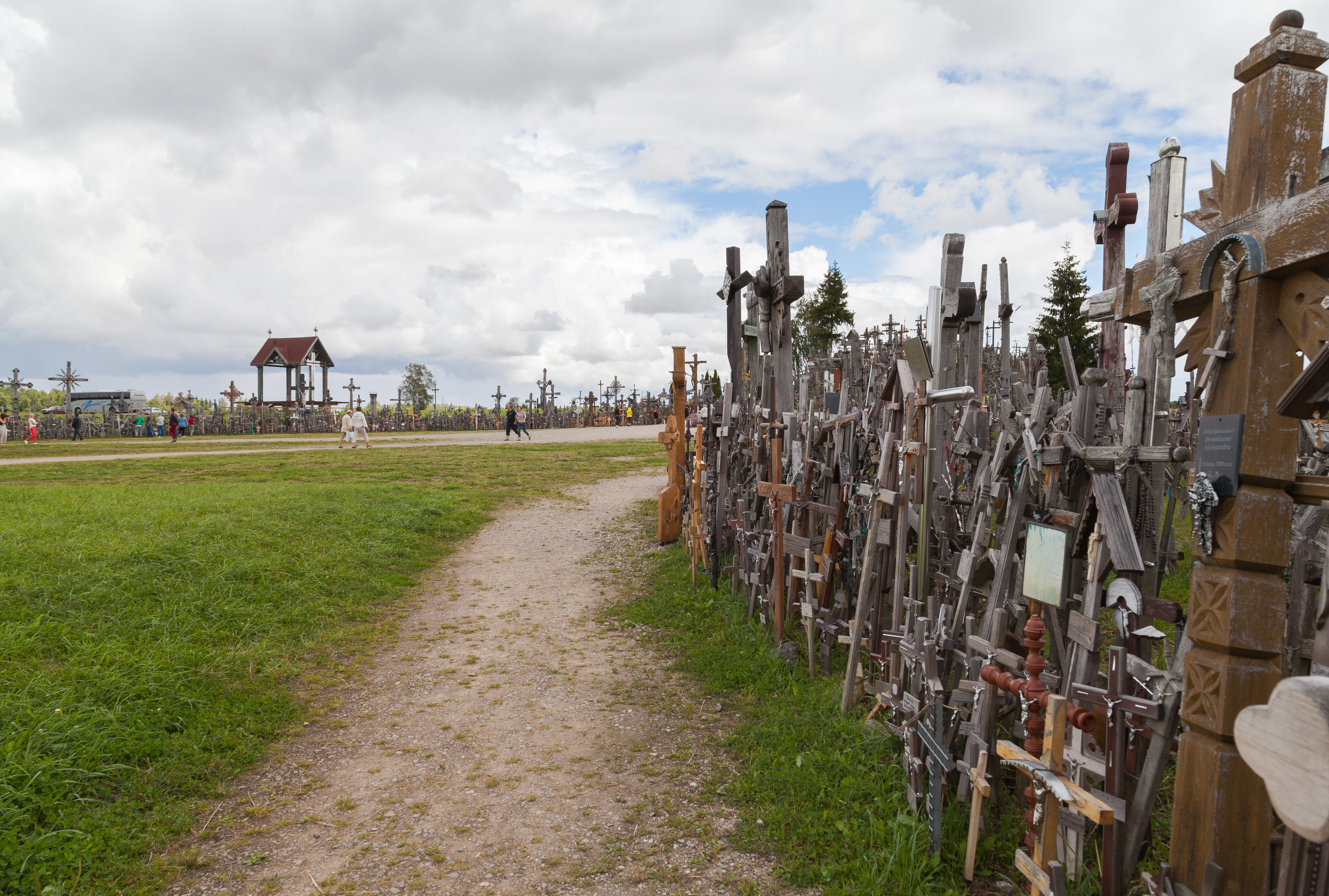

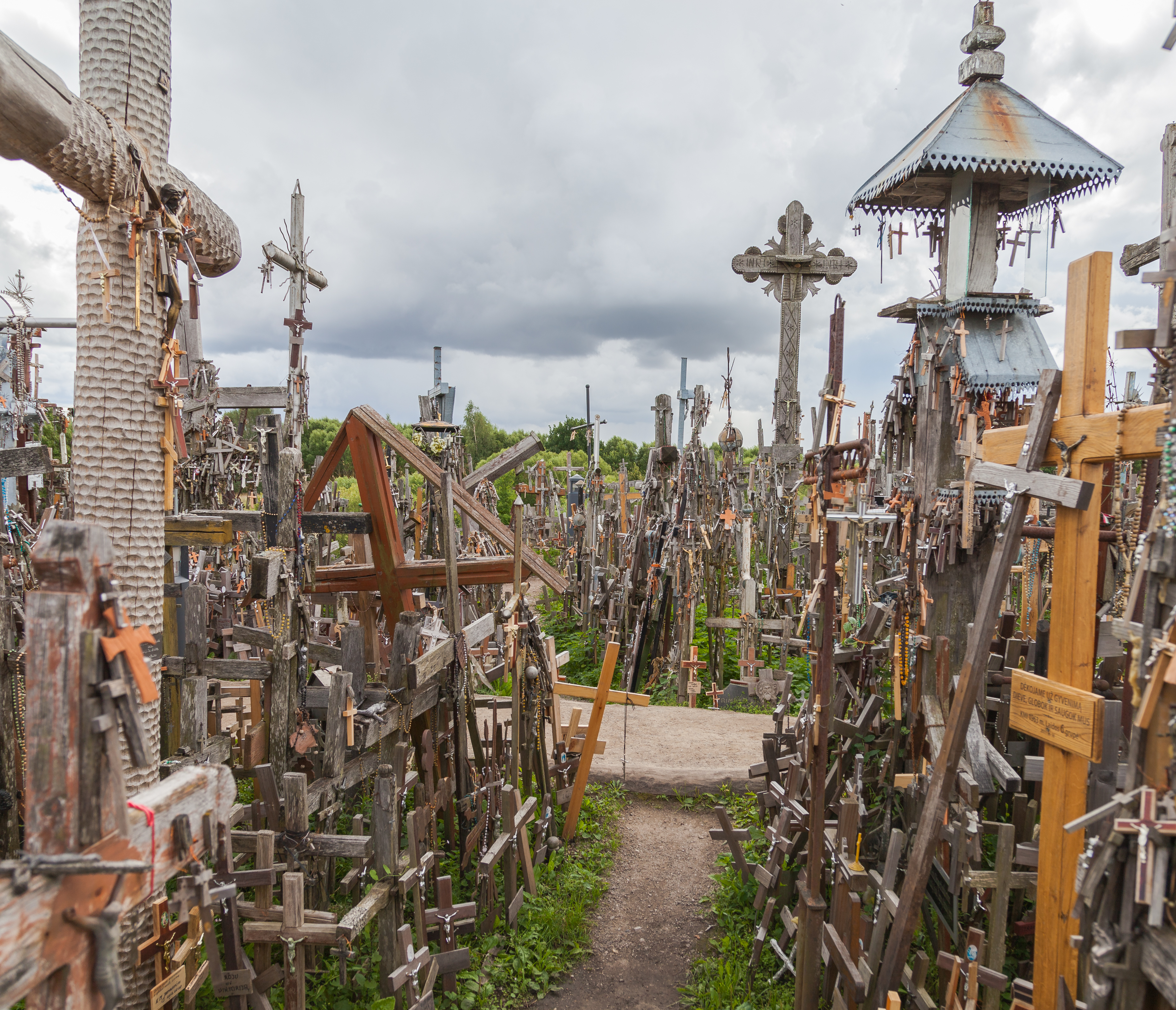

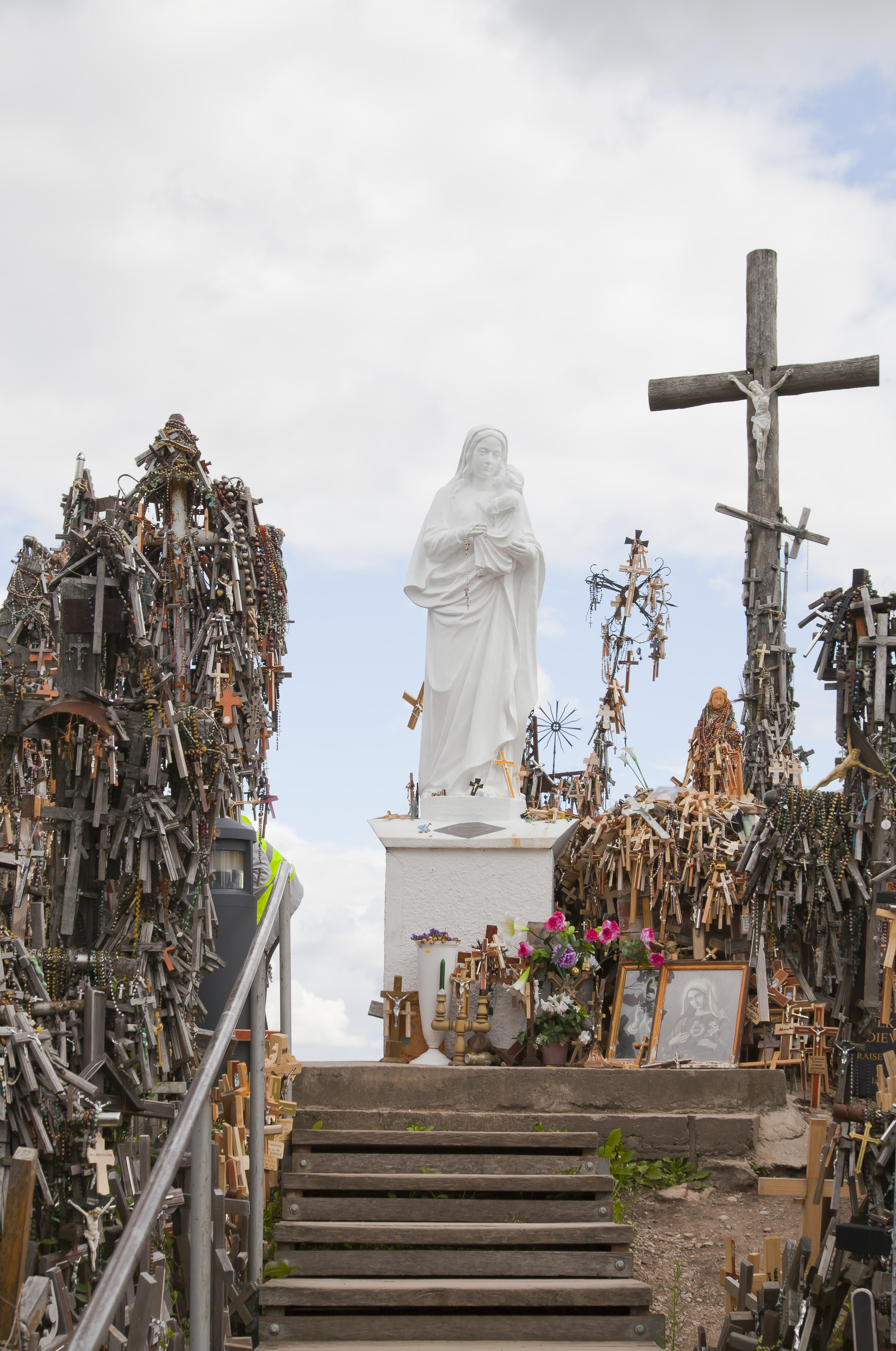

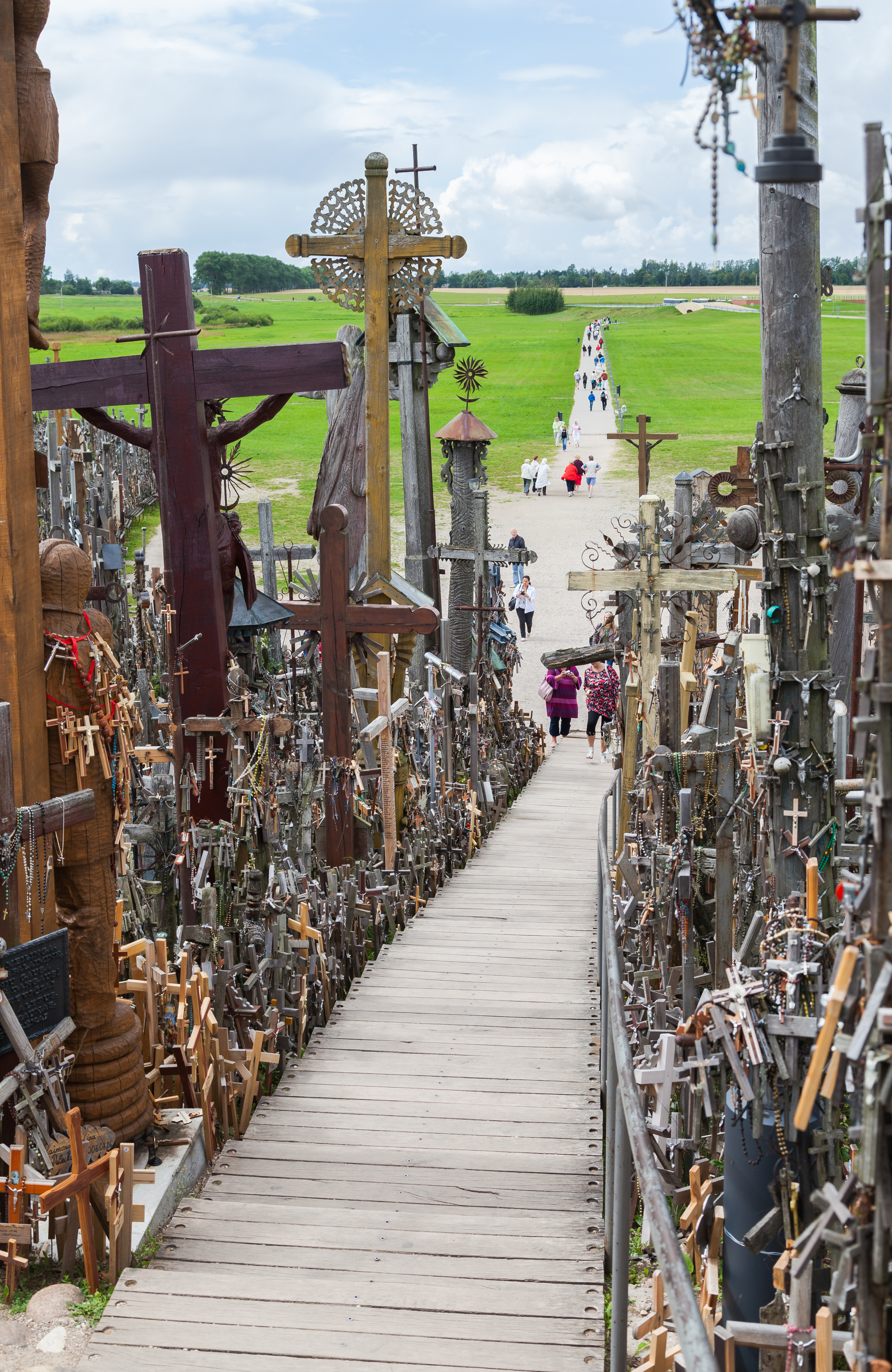

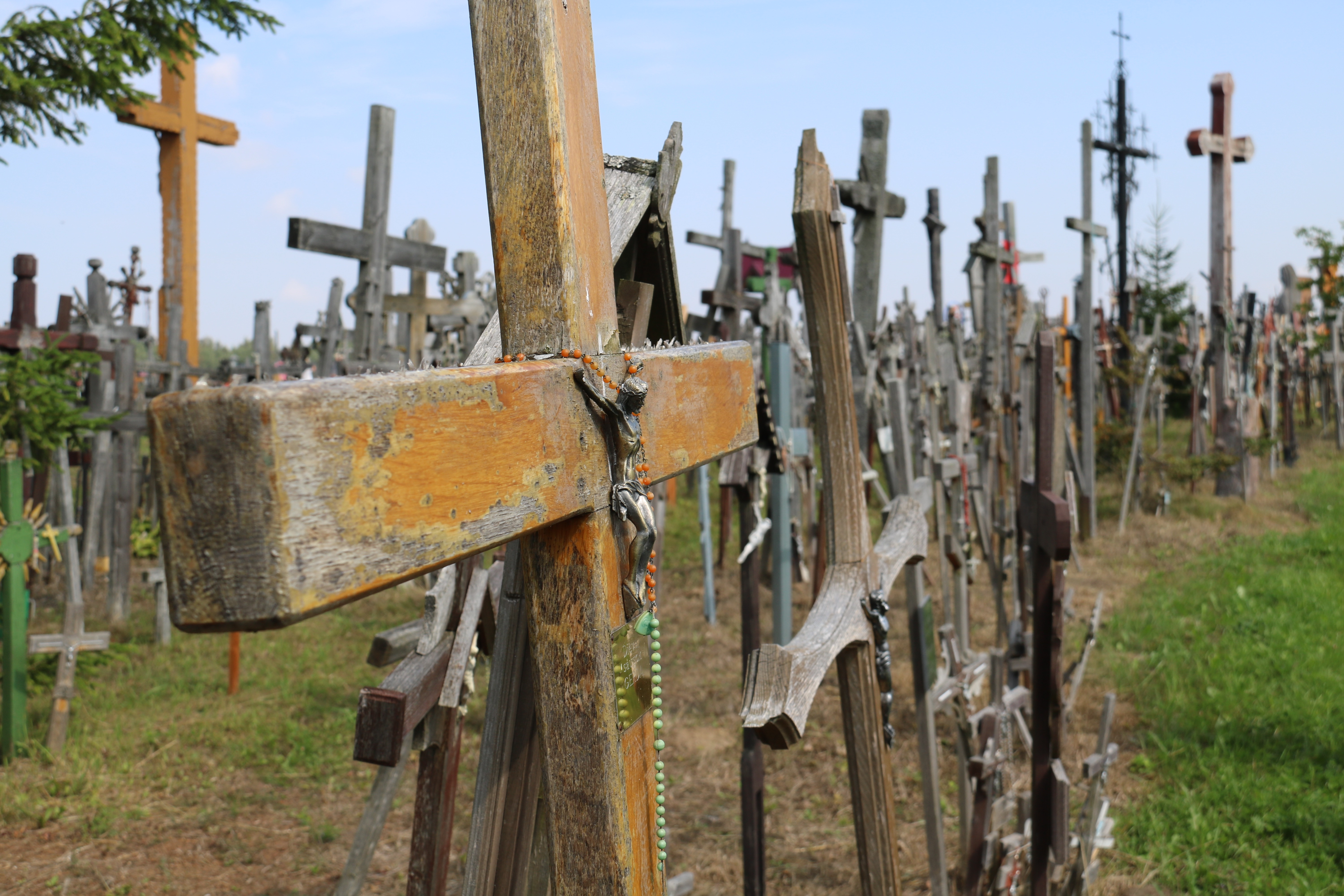

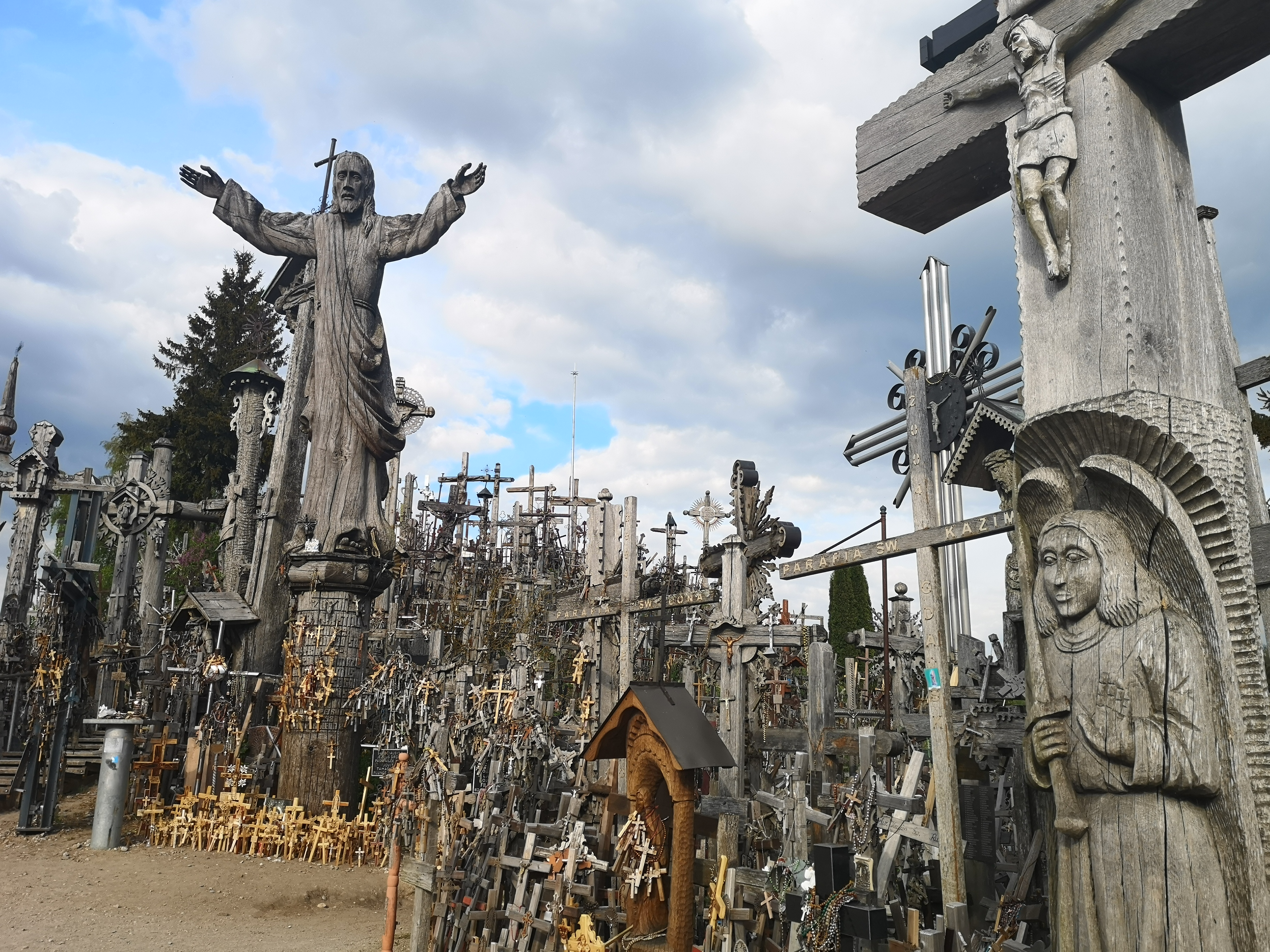

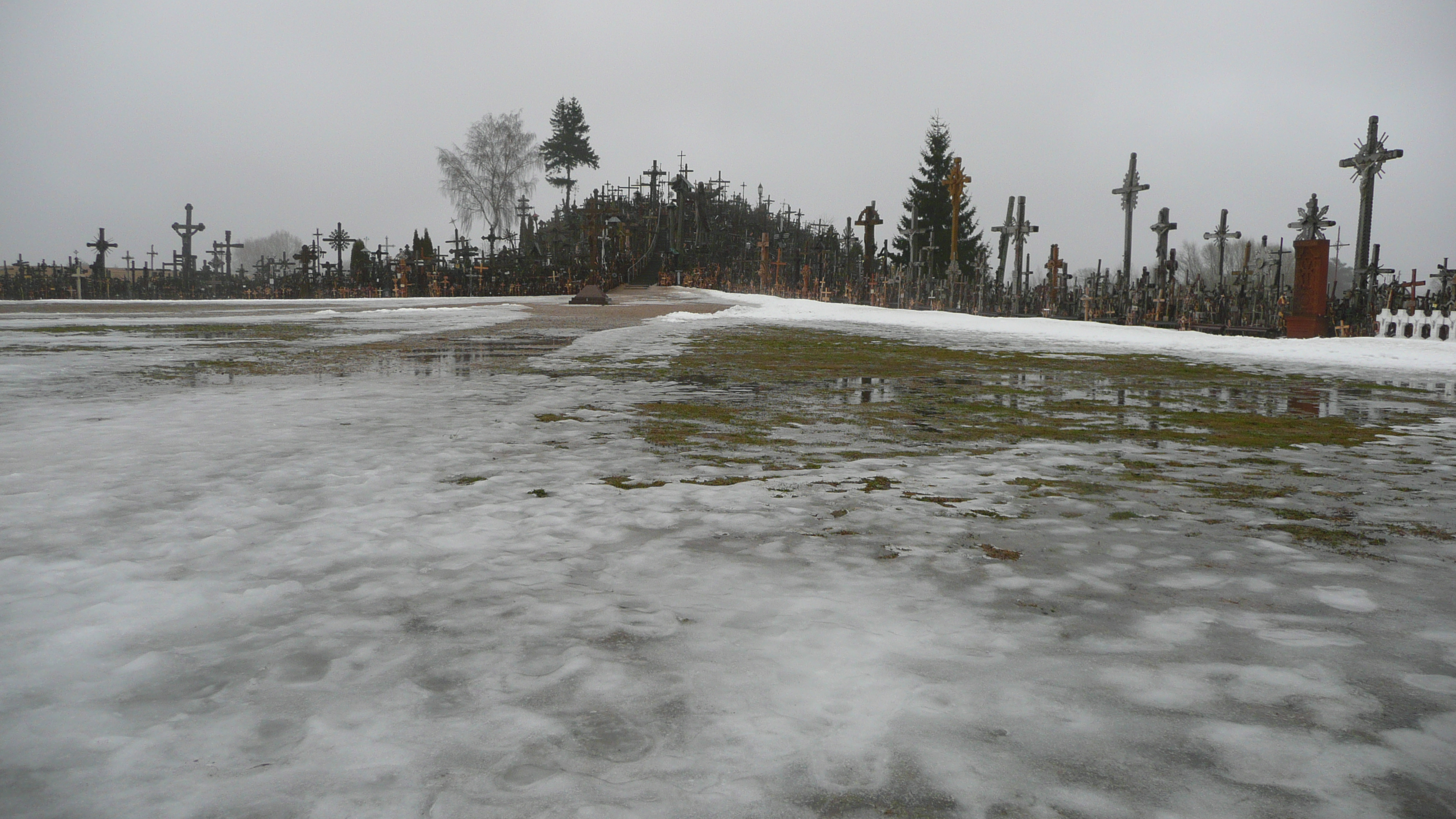
In winter

== See also ==
- Lithuanian cross crafting
- Three Crosses – prominent monument in Vilnius, capital of Lithuania
- Žemaičių Kalvarija – pilgrimage site in Samogitia, Lithuania
- Khatchkars – Armenian monumental crosses
