= Futermelok =

Eastern European baked good

Futermelok (Polish: [fu.tɛrˈmɛ.lɔk]; Silesian: furmelok [furˈmɛ.lɔk]) is a type of pryanik with icing from the region of Upper Silesia in Poland. It is usually diced and sold on the markets during fetes and parish festivals.

== Etymology ==
The world futermelok (plural: futermeloki) is used in Polish and comes from the German words Futter 'food, fodder' and Mehl 'flour'.
