= Great Žemaičių Kalvarija Festival =

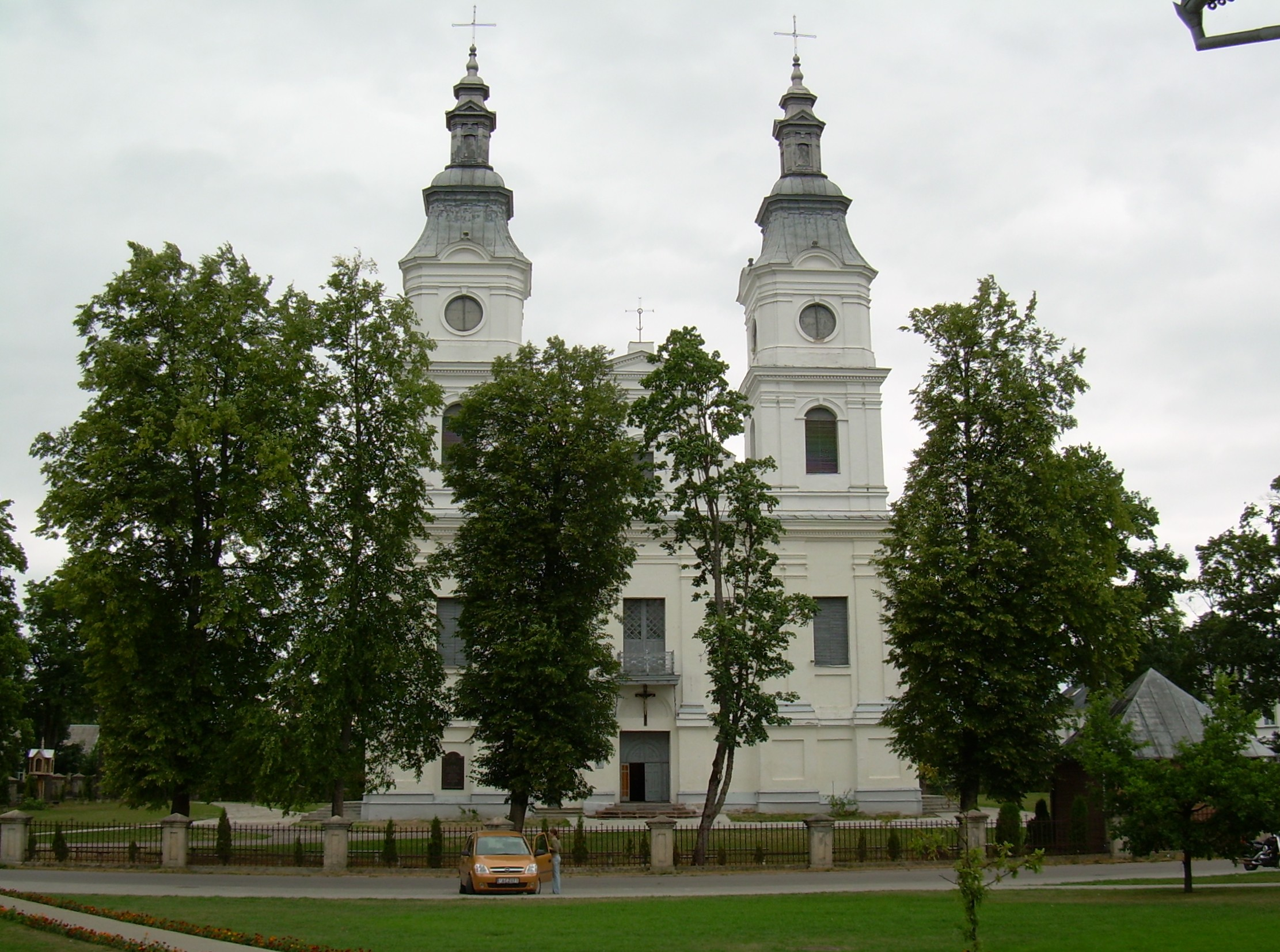
Žemaičių Kalvarija Basilica

The Great Žemaičių Kalvarija Festival or The Great Samogitian Calvary Festival (Lithuanian: Didieji Žemaičių Kalvarijos atlaidai) is a Roman Catholic festival dedicated to St. Mary. The festival is held annually and takes place every July in the small town of Žemaičių Kalvarija in Samogitia, Lithuania, attracting many pilgrims and tourists.

== History ==
The Samogitian Calvary Way of the Cross was created by bishop Jurgis Tiškevičius in 1637. He replicated all Stations of the Cross precisely just as they appeared in Jerusalem. In 1937 record number of 100,000 pilgrims visited The Great Žemaičių Kalvarija Festival.

== Festival ==
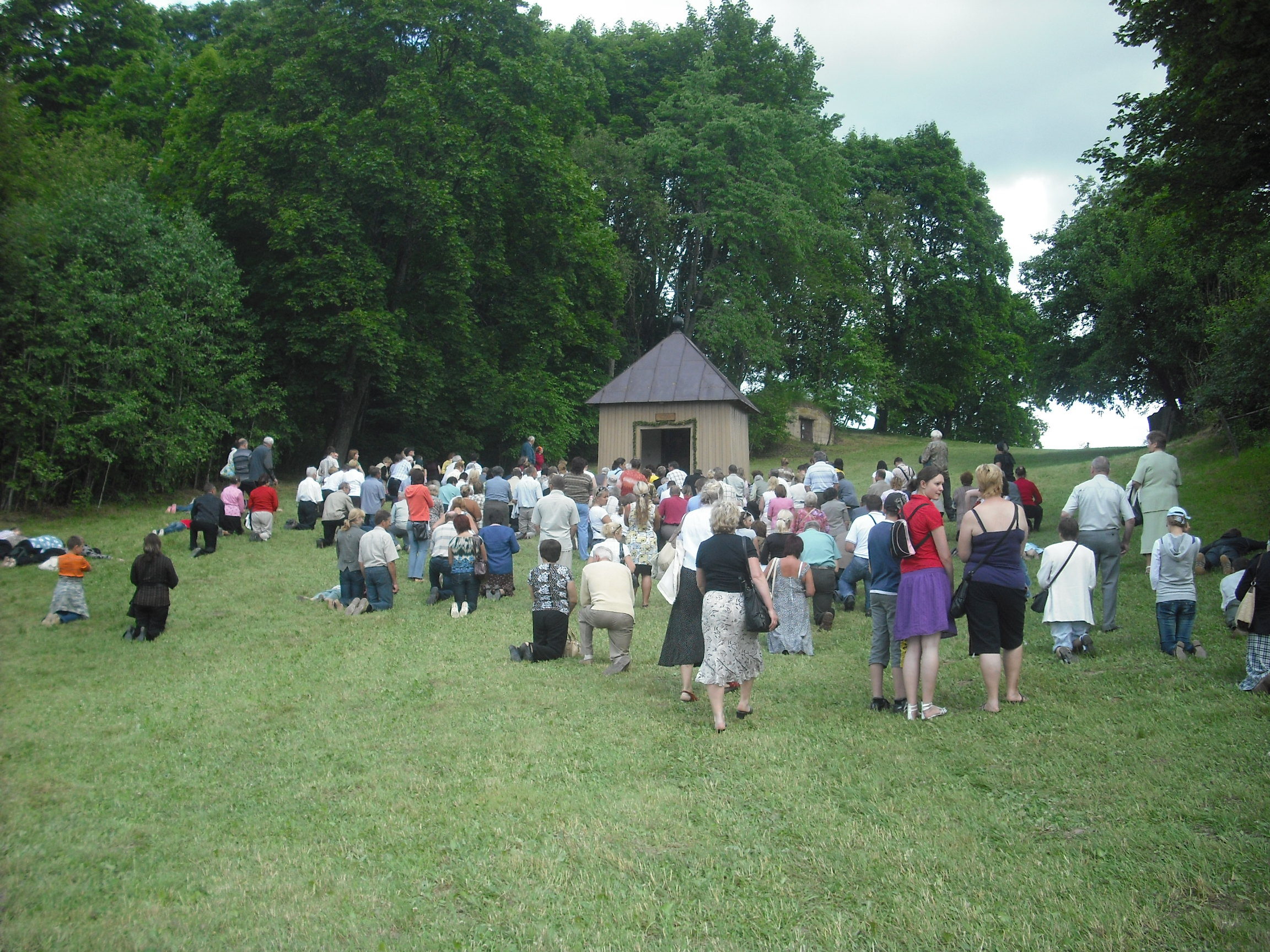
Pilgrims at one of the Stations of the Cross during Great Žemaičių Kalvarija Festival. The pilgrimage of Žemaičių Kalvarija in Lithuania is one of the most important pilgrimages for Catholics.

There are 21 Stations of the Cross in this town. Undertaking the stations of the cross is a very important procession for every Catholic, it should be done often or at least once in their lives. The Pope is the main guardian and supporter of this festival.

During the festival there are days dedicated to youth. Many events take place, which may serve spiritual needs of young people. There are special Masses held, dedicated to youth and children.

== Pilgrims ==
The festival attracts many pilgrims from Samogitia and Lithuania, many Catholic churches in Lithuania organize trips for people. Since 2004 there are more tourists and pilgrims coming from the EU States, especially from Poland, Ireland, Germany and Spain.

== Time of events ==
Great Žemaičių Kalvarija Festival being is held in the first week of July and takes place for around 2 weeks.

=== 2007 ===
In 2007 it was held from 1 to 12 July.

=== 2008 ===
In 2008 it was held from 2 to 12 July.

=== 2009 ===
In 2009 Žemaičių Kalvarija Great Festival was held from 1 to 12 July.

=== 2010 ===
In 2010 Žemaičių Kalvarija Great Festival was held from 1 to 12 July.

=== 2011 ===
In 2010 Žemaičių Kalvarija Great Festival was held from 2 to 12 July. 2011 was announced a Year of God's Mercy. Between 40 and 50 thousand pilgrims participated in Žemaičių Kalvarija Great Festival in 2011. Due to many pilgrims from Latvia in 2011, the special day was dedicated for the Latvian pilgrims.

=== 2012 ===
In 2012 Žemaičių Kalvarija Great Festival was held from 1 to 12 July. In 2012 was celebrated a Year of Blessed Jurgis Matulaitis.

== Broadcasting ==
12 hours. Holy masses were broadcast live:

- Radio:
  - On Maria's Radio:
    - 2nd, 3rd, 4th, 5, 6 July and 9 July 2009.
- Television:
  - On Lithuanian national television - 5 July 2009.
