= Šiluva =

- Town
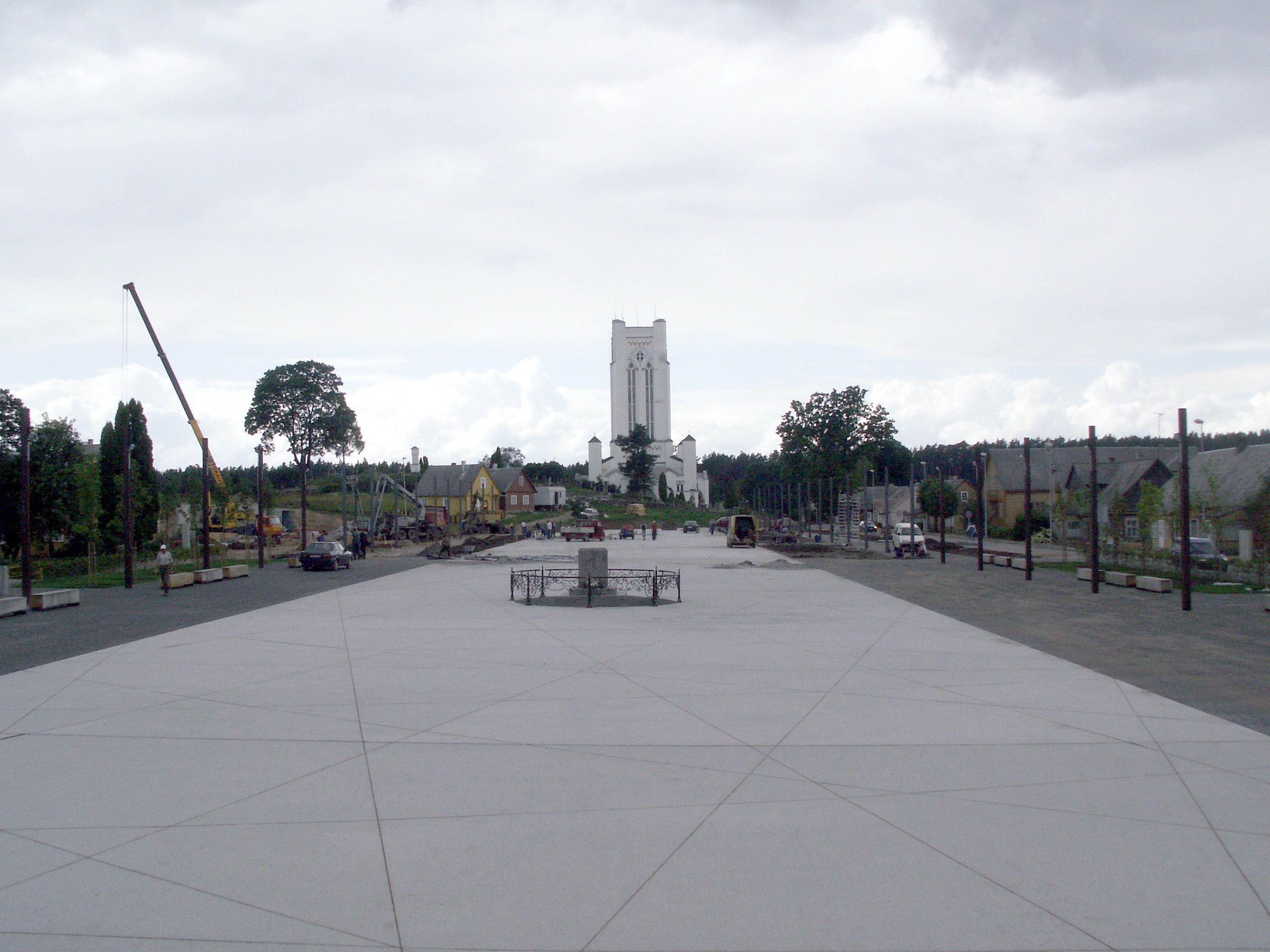

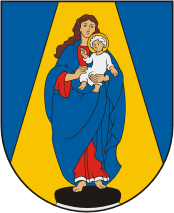
- Coat of arms

- Location of Šiluva
- Coordinates: 55°31′50″N 23°13′30″E
- Country: Lithuania
- Ethnographic region: Samogitia
- County: Kaunas County
- Municipality: Raseiniai district municipality
- Eldership: Šiluva eldership
- Capital of: Šiluva eldership
- First mentioned: Beginning of the 15th century

Population (2011)
  - Total: 635
- Time zone: UTC+2 (EET)
  - Summer (DST): UTC+3 (EEST)

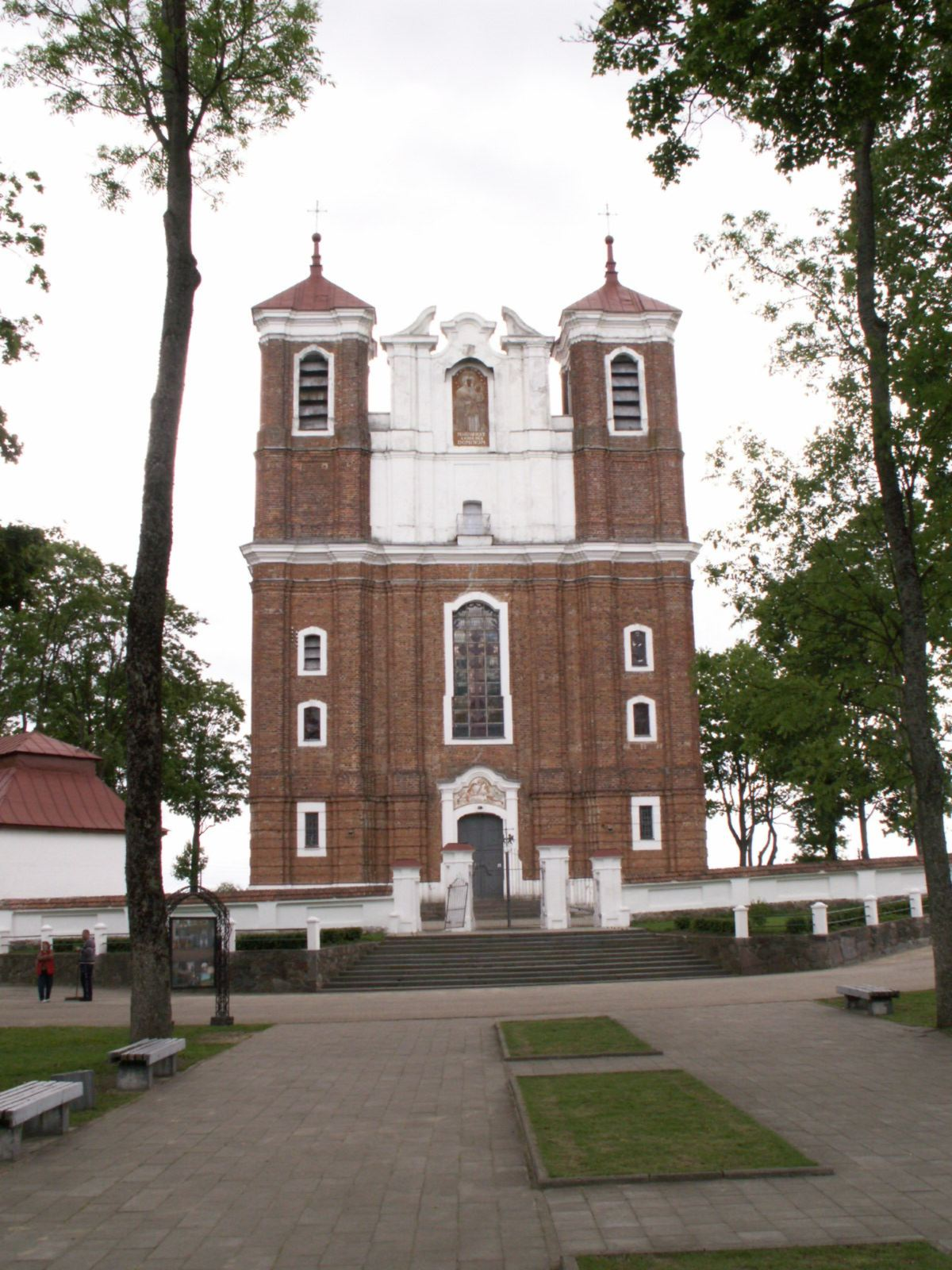
Church of Šiluva

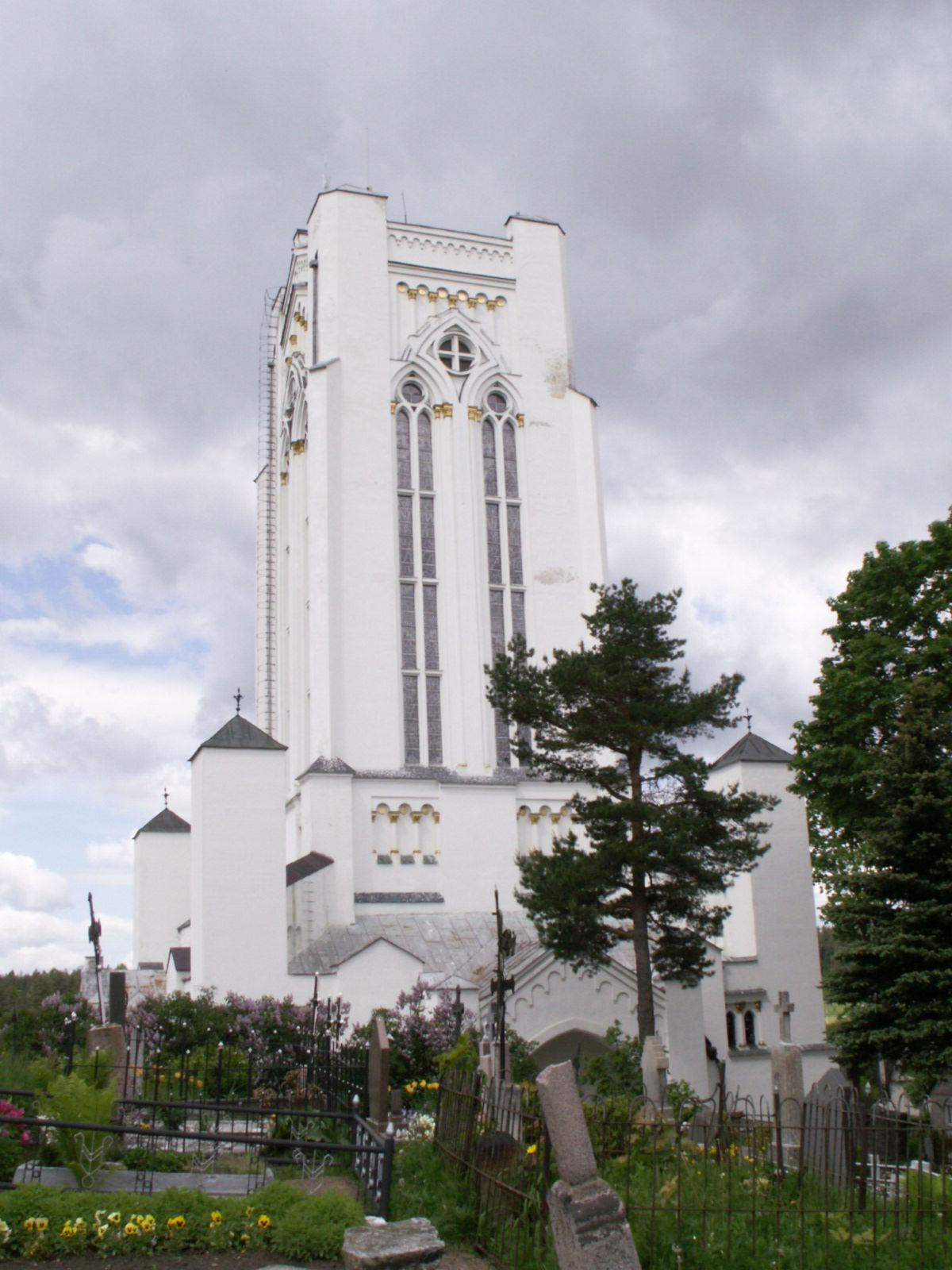
Šiluva Chapel designed by Antoni Wiwulski

Šiluva is a small town of less than 700 inhabitants in Lithuania. It is located in the region of Samogitia. It is a major site of Catholic pilgrimage in Lithuania.

== History ==
Šiluva was first mentioned in 1457 in relation to the building of the Church of the Nativity of the Blessed Virgin Mary and the Apostles Saint Peter and Saint Bartholomew by the Lithuanian noble Petras Gedgaudas. Later the Feast of the Nativity of the Blessed Virgin Mary attracted huge numbers of the faithful to Šiluva, some from as far away of what later became Protestant Prussia.

With the advent of the Reformation in 16th century Lithuania, many of the inhabitants of the Šiluva region converted to Calvinism. This caused the church to eventually be ransacked and closed around 1569. The last parish priest, John Holubka, buried the remaining church valuables and legal documents and deeds in an iron box near the vandalized church.

Subsequent attempts by the Catholics to regain the property through legal proceedings against the Calvinists were hindered by the fact that the exact location of the documents pertaining to the church were unknown. Some Catholics believed that the Blessed Virgin Mary miraculously intervened in the matter by appearing at the church and holding the baby Jesus in her arms and weeping bitterly. The founding documents of the Catholic Church were found shortly after the apparition, and in 1622 the Catholics reclaimed the church. The famous Feast of the Nativity of the Blessed Virgin Mary resumed in a small wooden church on the site of the apparition, and the icon of the Blessed Virgin Mary with the Divine Child became renowned as a source for miracles. The current-day Basilica of the Nativity of the Blessed Virgin Mary was erected on the site in 1786.

The devotion to Our Lady of Šiluva was suppressed once again during the partition of Lithuania since the event had become a venue for sharing Lithuanian religious and secular books that were smuggled in from Prussia – in spite of a Tsarist ban of any Lithuanian publications in Latin characters. Following the restitution of Lithuania's independence in 1918, the celebration in Šiluva was reinstated and took on special significance. After the Soviet occupation of Lithuania in 1940, a policy against popular religious traditions was implemented. The Soviet regime failed to completely suppress the Feast of the Nativity of the Blessed Virgin Mary although the KGB routinely sabotaged the pilgrimages. An example of the Soviet interference occurred during the pilgrimage in 1979, when the government blocked all of the roads to Šiluva under the pretext that an epidemic of swine fever was rampant in the vicinity.

Throughout its turbulent history, Šiluva has remained the spiritual center for the Catholic faithful from many parts of Lithuania. The Feast of Šiluva has experienced a tremendous revival following the reestablishment of independence in 1990. Pope John Paul II made a special pilgrimage to pray at the National Shrine of Our Lady in Šiluva, during his visit to Lithuania in 1993. On the tenth anniversary of the pope's visit, a new facility for pilgrims and candidate seminarians was blessed by Archbishop of Kaunas Sigitas Tamkevičius and named The John Paul II Home (Lithuanian: Jono Pauliaus II namai). Lithuanians in the diaspora also hold a strong devotion to Our Lady of Šiluva so that there is a significant chapel dedicated to Our Lady of Šiluva in the United States.

== See also ==
- Our Lady of Šiluva
