= Church of St. Stanislaus the Bishop, Beržoras =

Church of St. Stanislaus the Bishop
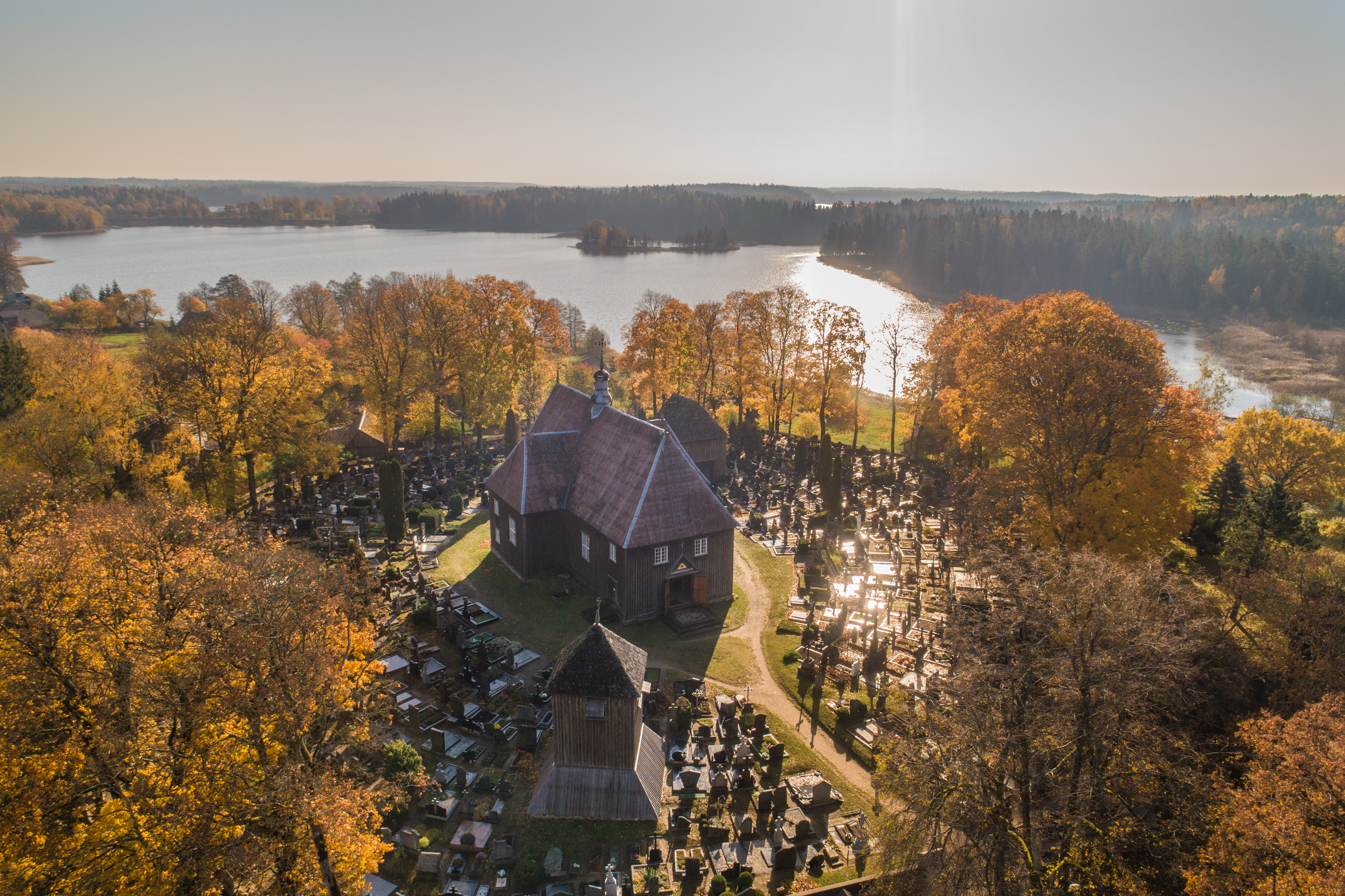
- Aerial view of the church and the cemetery
- Interactive map of the Church of St. Stanislaus the Bishop area

General information
- Location: Beržoras, Lithuania
- Coordinates: 56.025215°N 21.812823°E
- Completed: 1746

Church of St. Stanislaus the Bishop is a wooden Roman Catholic church in Beržoras, Plungė District Municipality, Lithuania. The church complex includes a 14-station outdoor Way of the Cross.

== History ==
It is said that a shepherd saw a painting of the Holy Virgin Mary on a treetop. The priests brought the painting down and took it to the Plateliai church; however, the painting disappeared from the church and reappeared in the same place in the treetop. According to the legend, it was then decided to build a new church on this spot where the painting would hang.

The first building of the complex, the wooden chapel of St. John of Nepomuk, rose no later than in the 18th century. Unfortunately, the exact date is not known. Eventually, the number of Christians in the village grew so that they could not fit into the chapel. Thus, in 1746 a larger church was built and it was given the title of St. Stanislaus the Bishop. The church has the characteristics of Lithuanian folk architecture, with a wooden and cross-shaped design. However, the main altar of the church is considered to be Baroque in style, and there are four altars in total.

The Calvary of Beržoras has been in use since 1760, and is the only Calvary to be established in the 18th-century Lithuania. The Calvary was established by the parish priest Juozapas Vaitkevičius. In the fourteen chapels, the usual 14 Stations of the Cross can be found. In the early 1970s, the chapels were demolished, but once Lithuania regained independence they were rebuilt.

== Gallery ==
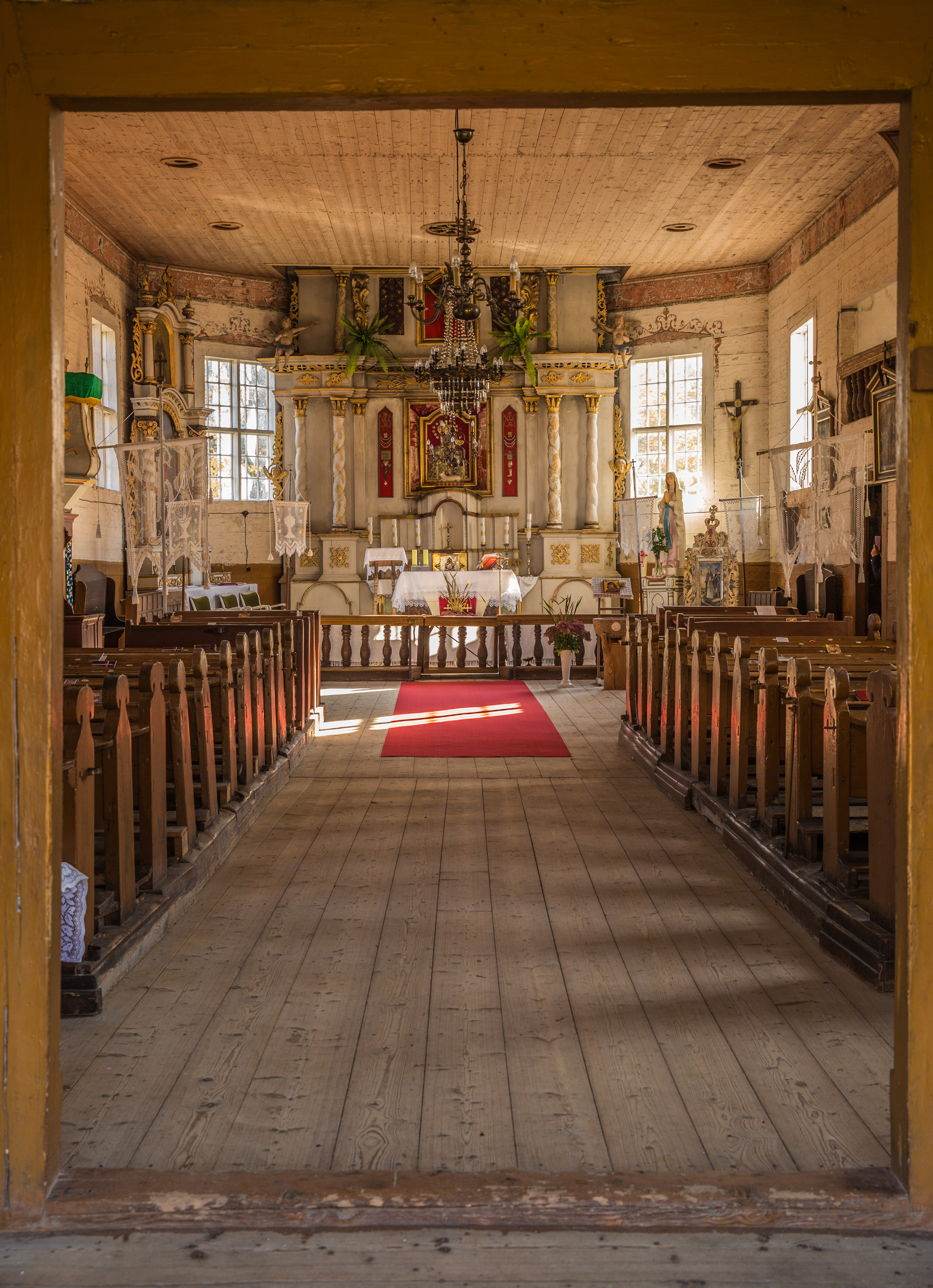
Church interior

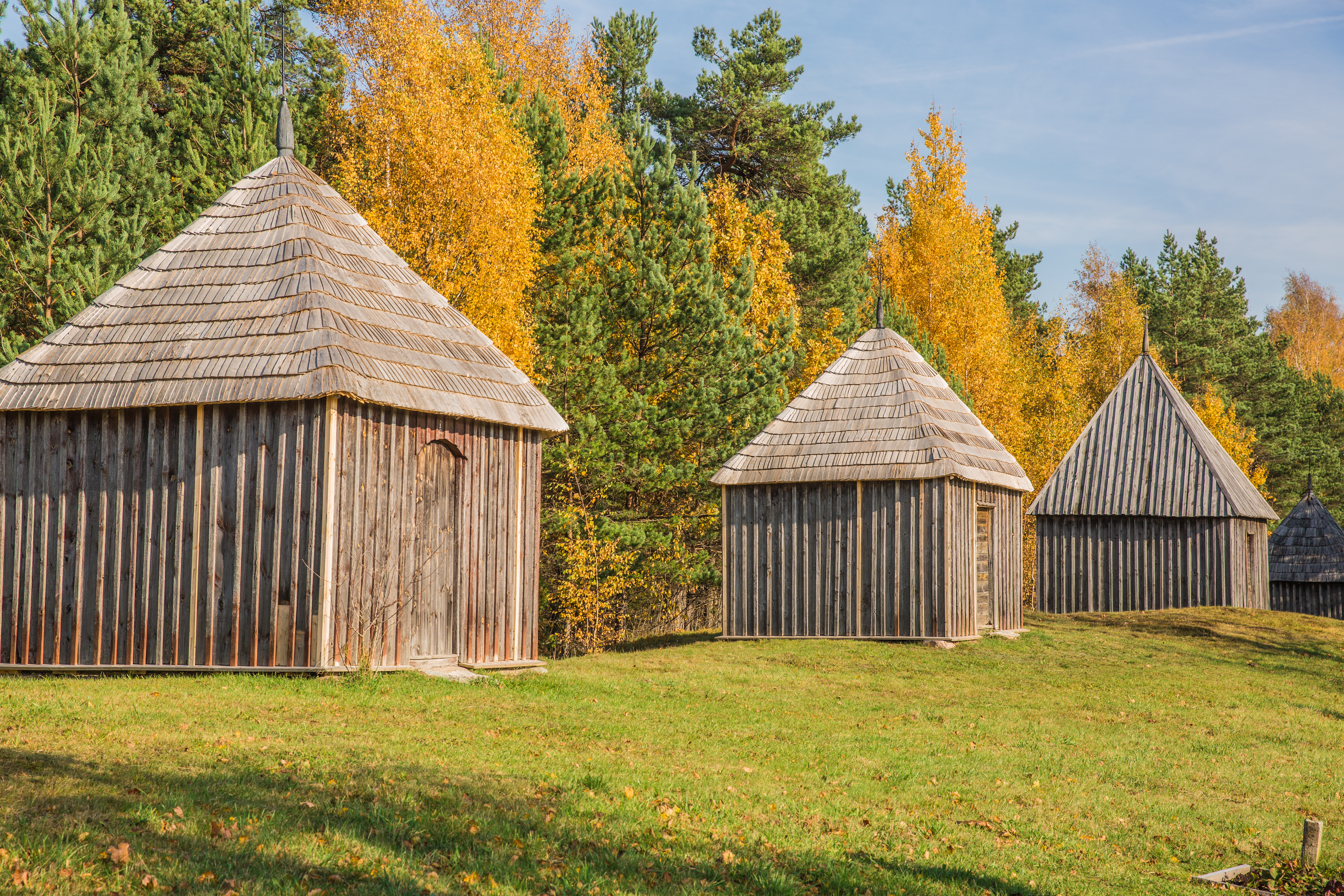
Three of the 14 station of the Calvary

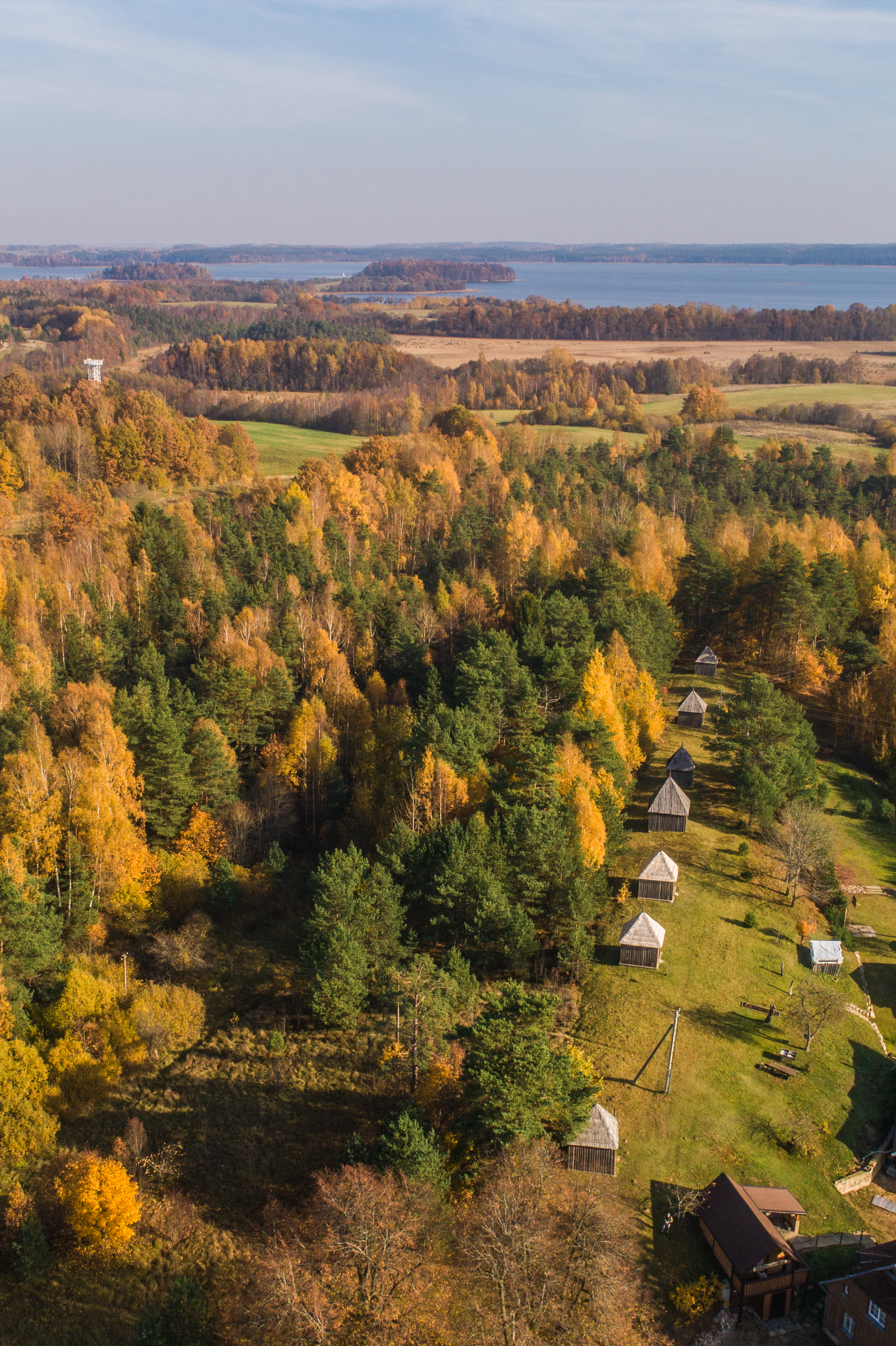
Aerial view of the calvary
