= Basilica of the Visitation of the Blessed Virgin Mary, Trakai =

Roman Catholic church in Dzūkija, Lithuania

Coordinates: 54°38′34.3″N 24°56′4″E

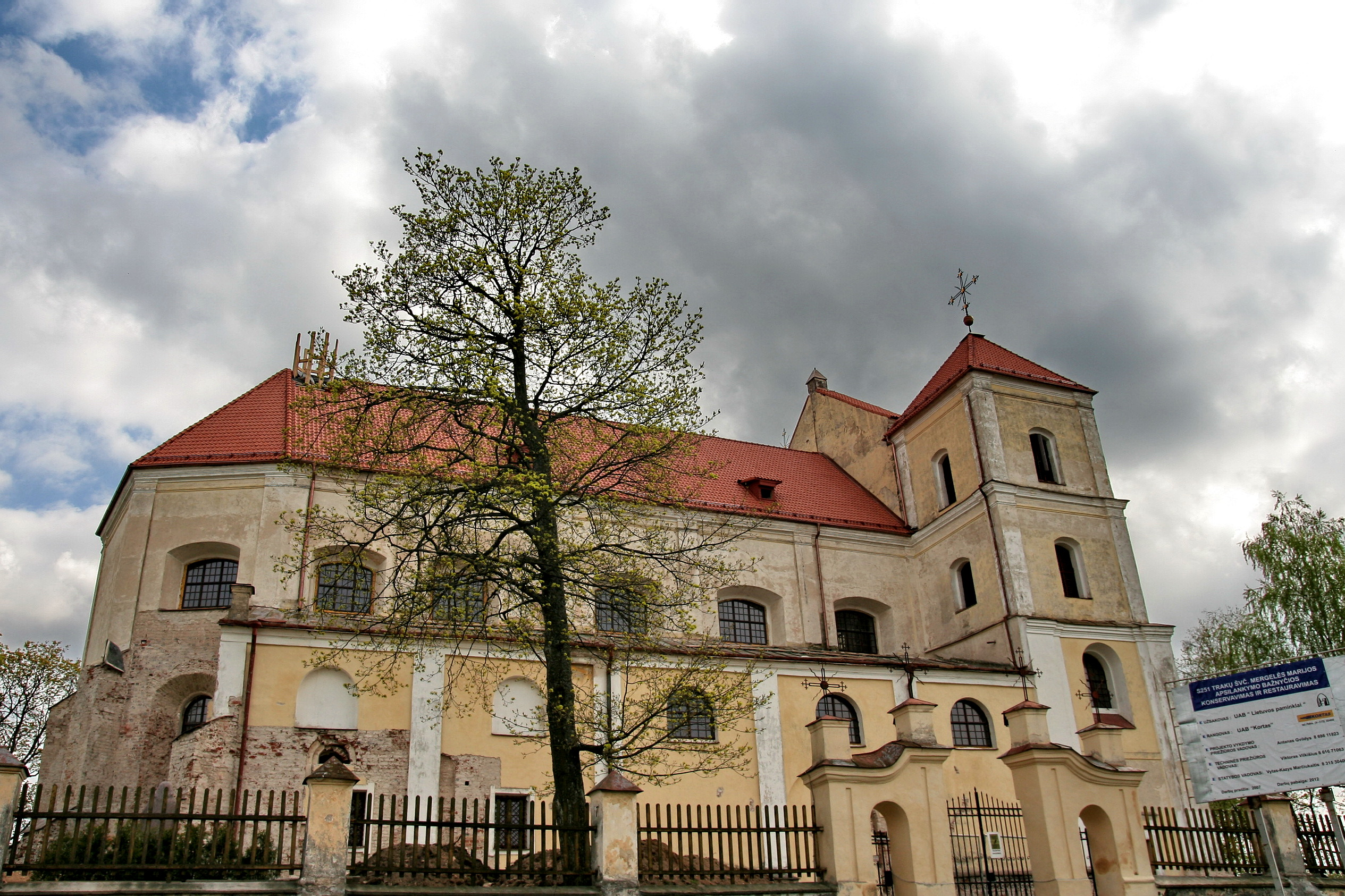
Trakai basilica in 2008 before restoration

The Basilica of the Visitation of the Blessed Virgin Mary (Lithuanian: Švč. Mergelės Marijos Apsilankymo bazilika) in Trakai, Lithuania, is a Roman Catholic church. It was founded by Vytautas the Great in 1409 and constructed in the gothic style. It was later significantly altered during the Baroque period, and its current appearance is mostly defined by these alterations. The main altarpiece contains the icon of Our Lady of Trakai.

== Sources ==
- Tomasz Krzywick. Litwa: przewodnik, Oficyna Wydawnicza "Rewasz", 2005, p. 402 (in Polish).
