= Žemaičių Kalvarija =

Pilgrimage center in Lithuania

- Town
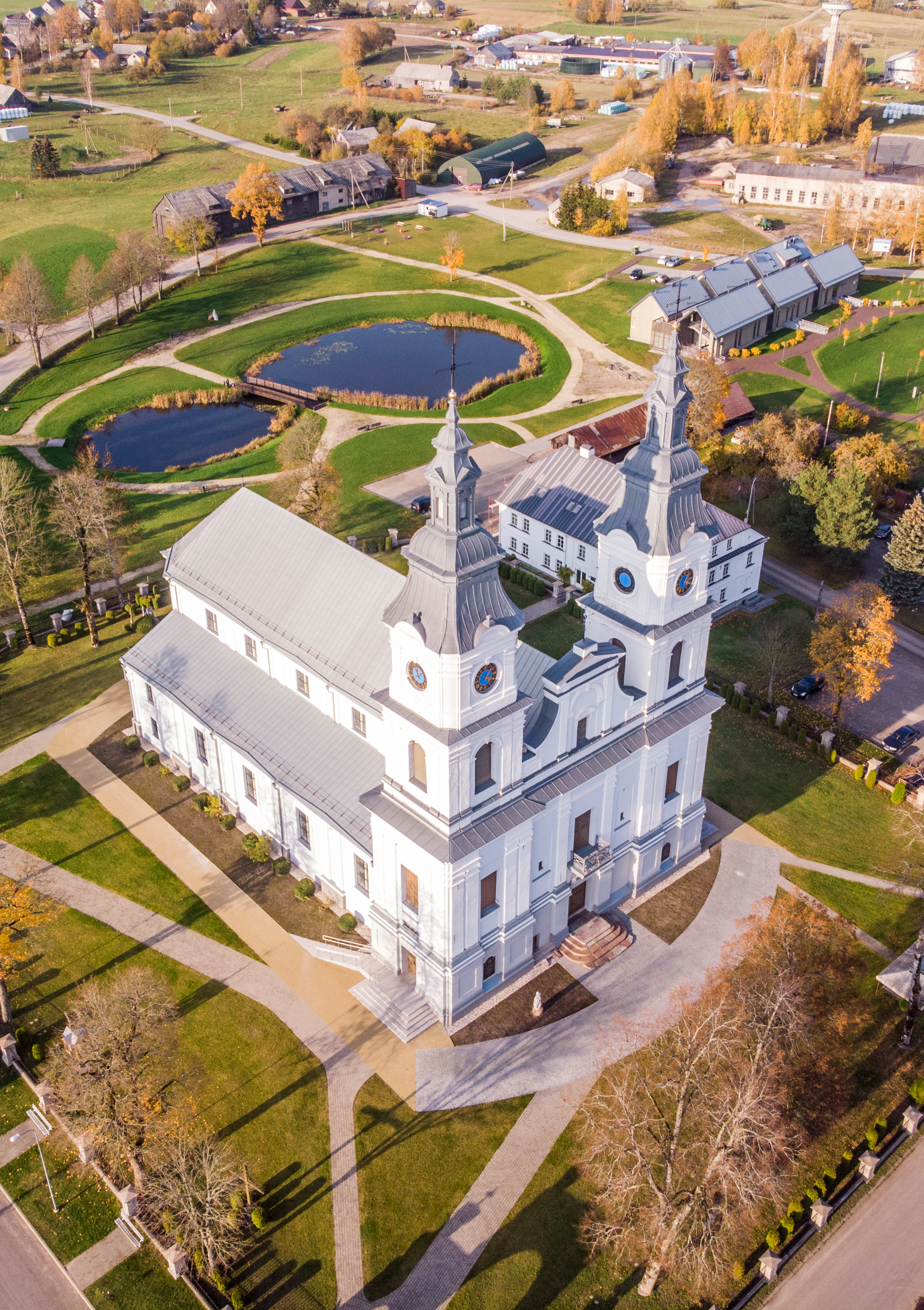
- Church of Žemaičių Kalvarija

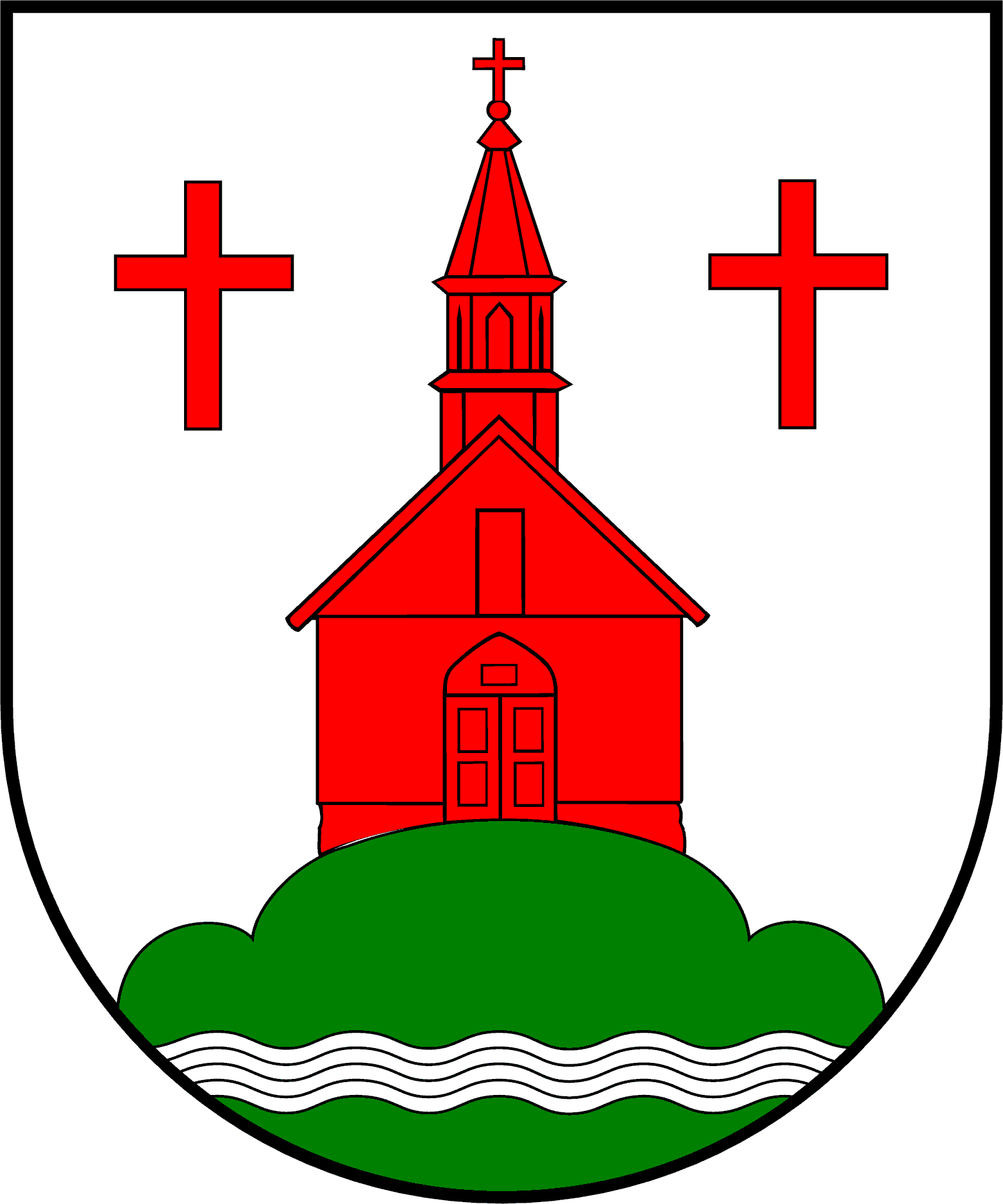
- Coat of arms

- Location of Žemaičių Kalvarija
- Coordinates: 56°07′N 22°01′E
- Country: Lithuania
- Ethnographic region: Samogitia
- County: Telšiai County
- Municipality: Plungė district municipality
- Eldership: Žemaičių Kalvarija eldership
- Capital of: Žemaičių Kalvarija eldership
- First mentioned: 1253

Population (2011)
  - Total: 696
- Time zone: UTC+2 (EET)
  - Summer (DST): UTC+3 (EEST)

Žemaičių Kalvarija (Samogitian: Žemaitiu Kalvarėjė, English: Samogitian Calvary) is a town in Plungė district municipality, Lithuania. It is known as a major site for Catholic pilgrimage.

Every July the town hosts a large Church festival, known as the Great Žemaičių Kalvarija Festival. It attracts many tourists from all over Lithuania and abroad. It is one of the few "must-visit" locations for most Roman Catholics of Lithuania. The main church of the town boasts a sculpture of the crucified Jesus and a picture of St. Maria, which was brought to this town in the middle of the 17th century from Rome. The picture is considered to be saintly.

== History of the name ==
This place was mentioned in 1253 as Garde (Gardaí). In the 17th century, when the main church and road of cross were built, people started calling it the New Jerusalem, but after some time it was named Kalvarija after the name of the hill where Jesus was crucified. In the 20th century, the town was renamed to Žemaičių Kalvarija to avoid misunderstandings, because there is another town in the southwest of Lithuania called Kalvarija.

During the Soviet years, 1964–1989, the town was renamed to Varduva after Varduva river that flows near the town. At that time, people, who visited this place as pilgrims were persecuted by the KGB. Only in 1989 was the town's name restored to its historic name Žemaičių Kalvarija.

== The Great Žemaičių Kalvarija Church Festival ==
The Great Žemaičių Kalvarija Church Festival (Lithuanian: Didieji Žemaičių Kalvarijos atlaidai, Samogitian: Dėdlė̄jė Žemaitiu Kalvarėjės atlaidā) takes place every June. There are 21 Stations of the Cross in this town. Undertaking the station of the cross is a very important procession for a Catholic, it should be done often. It is one of the most important pilgrimage routes for Roman Catholics. This festival dates back to 1742. The Pope is the main guardian and supporter of this festival.

During the festival there are days dedicated to youth. Many events take place, which may serve spiritual needs of young people. There are special Masses held, dedicated to youth and children.

The festival attracts many tourists from Samogitia and Lithuania, many Catholic churches in Lithuania organize trips for people. Since 2004 there were more tourists and pilgrims coming from the EU States, especially from Poland, Ireland, Germany and Spain.

== Transport ==
There are regular bus services to the town from Klaipėda and Plungė. The closest airports are Palanga International Airport (Lithuania), Riga International Airport (Latvia), Kaunas Airport (Lithuania) and Liepāja International Airport (Latvia).
