= Our Lady of Trakai =

Roman Catholic icon

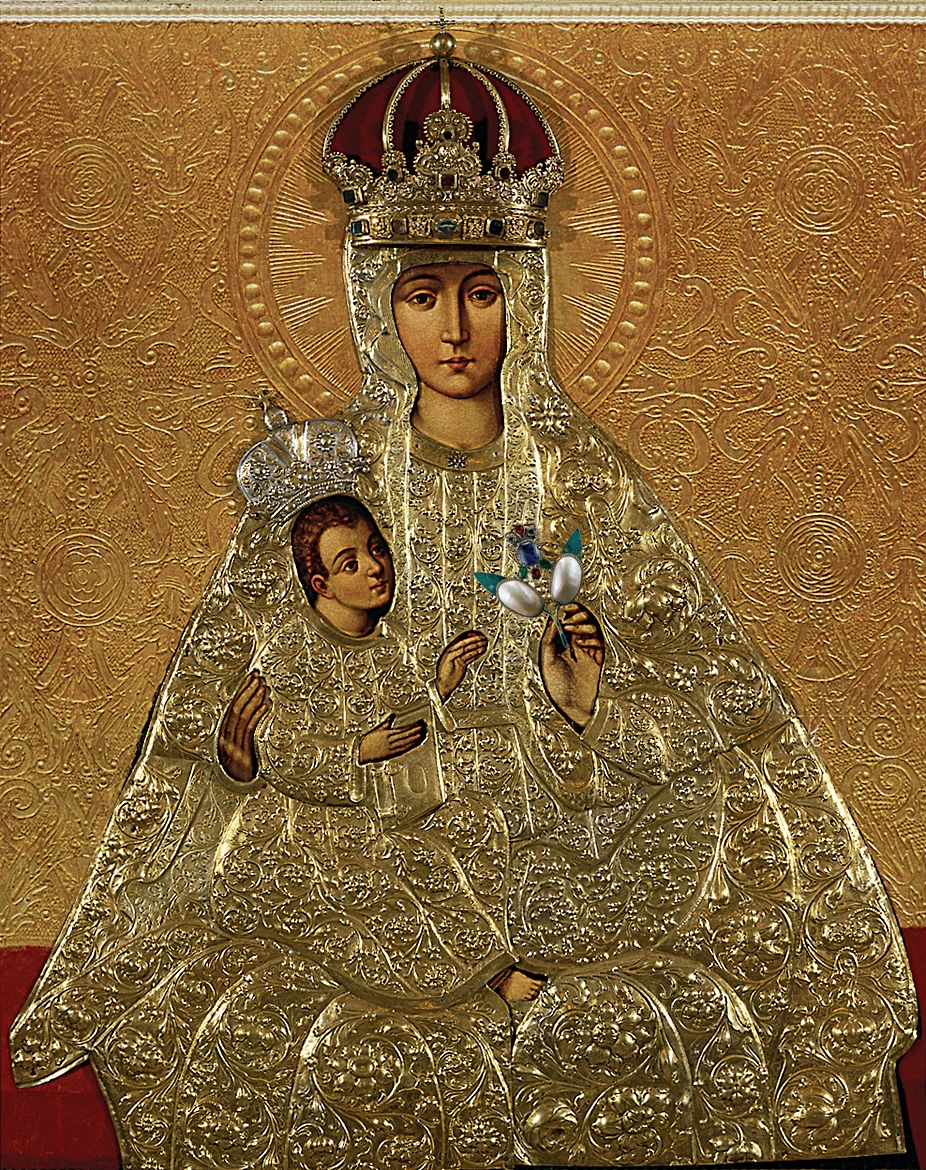
- Artist: Unknown
- Year: 15th century: original version
- Completion date: 17th century: current version
- Medium: oil on canvas
- Dimensions: 127.7 cm × 110.3 cm (50.3 in × 43.4 in)
- Location: St. Mary Church; Trakai

Our Lady of Trakai (Lithuanian: Trakų Dievo Motina) is a Roman Catholic icon, located in the main altarpiece of the Basilica of the Visitation of the Blessed Virgin Mary in Trakai, Lithuania.

Pope Clement XI sent Bishop Konstanty Kazimierz Brzostowski for the canonical coronation of the venerated image on 4 September 1718.

== Analysis ==
The icon was painted in the middle of the 15th century and partially repainted in the early 17th century. However, according to legend, it was a gift from the Byzantine Emperor Manuel II Palaiologos to Grand Duke Vytautas on the occasion of his baptism.

Stefan Czarniecki, Kings John II Casimir Vasa and John III Sobieski prayed before the icon.

== Description ==
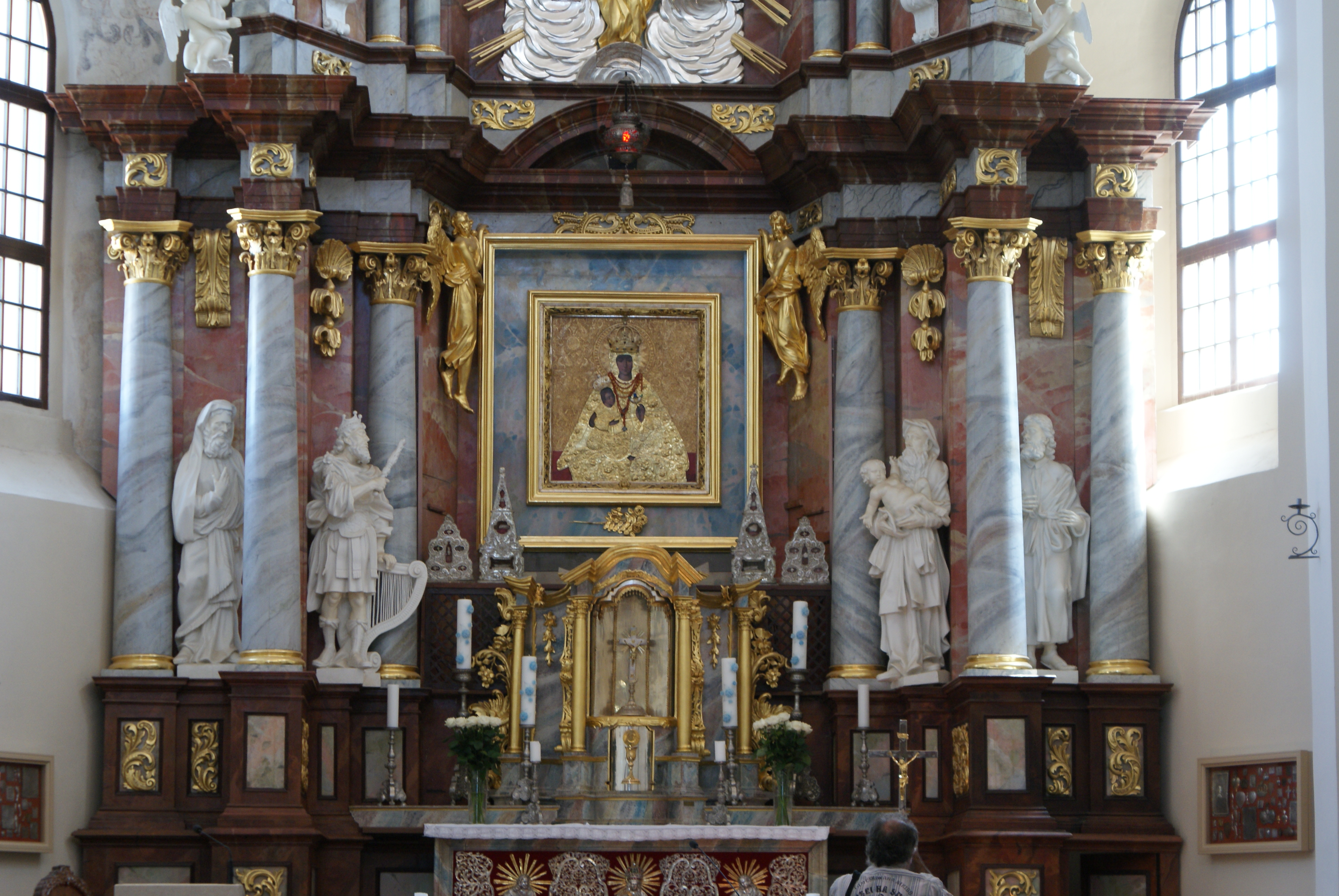
Icon within the main altar

The icon depicts the Virgin Mary, with her right hand supporting baby Jesus sitting on her lap, while her left holds a branch with three flowers.

Gothic and Renaissance elements are visible in the icon. It combines old and new iconography, inspired by European art forms.

The icon is defined by its bright light color, soft shapes and the specificity of the facial features. The depiction of individual traits is so specific, and the sensitivity of the living body texture so sincere, that the image is more akin to a portrait than an icon.

== Sources ==
- Гісторыя беларускага мастацтва: У 6 т. Т. 1: Ад старажытных часоў да другой паловы XVI cт.; [рэд. кал.: С. В. Марцэлеў (гал.рэд.) [і інш.]; рэд. тома С. В. Марцэлеў, Л. М. Дробаў; АН БССР, Ін-т мастацтвазнаўства, этнаграфіі і фальклору. — Мінск : Навука і тэхніка, 1987. — 303 с. : iл.
- Przewodnik po sanktuariach maryjnych. Z dawna Polski tyś Królową, Szymanów 1996.
- A. Dylewski, M. Masłowski, B. Piotrowski, J. Swajdo, P. Wójcik: Litwa, Łotwa, Estonia i obwód kaliningradzki. Praktyczny przewodnik. Bielsko-Biała: Pascal, 2008. ISBN 978-83-7513-148-2.
