= Alantės Manor =

16th Century Lithuanian Ruined Manor

- Alančių dvaras (Lithuanian)
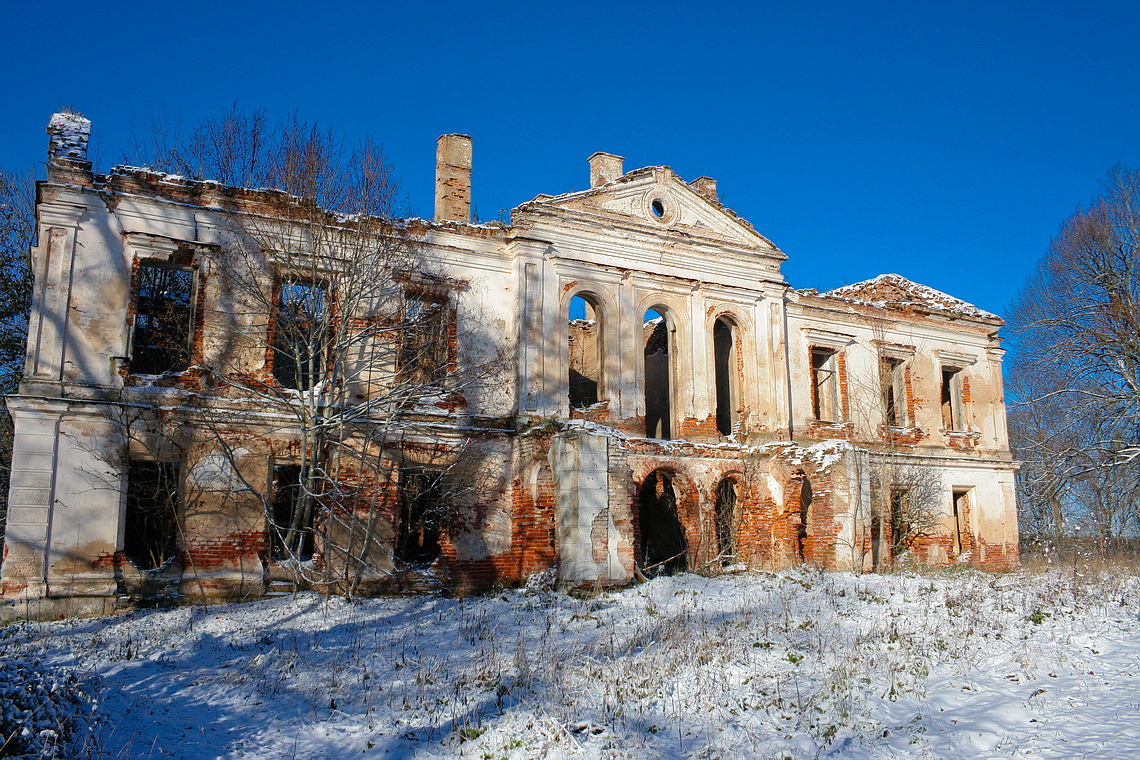
- Paežeriai Manor in 2006

- Location within Lithuania
- Interactive map of Alantės Manor
- 55°31′16″N 24°33′13″E
- Type: Residential manor
- Location: Alantės, Lithuania

History
- Built: between 1876-1884
- Built for: Antanas Rudamina

Site notes
- Architectural style: Classical Revival
- Owner: Ernestas Šešetas

Alantės Manor (Lithuanian: Alančių dvaras) is the ruins of a former residential manor in Alantės, Panevėžys district.

== Architecture ==
The Romantic Classicism-style manor house, officina and other outbuildings and the park were built by the Rudamina family in the 19th century. Very limited information is available on the interior of the manor house. The first floor was likely used for formal functions and had an enfilade layout. Currently, the manor is undergoing a slow renovation.

== History ==
=== Early history ===
The history of Alančiai Manor dates back to the 16th century, before the establishment Polish–Lithuanian Commonwealth. In 1569, the lands of Alančiai and the surrounding villages were granted by an indenture to Levonija, the Subcamerarius (the land border dispute judge) of Vilnius, descended from the ducal family of Žilinskas. In 1696 Andrejus Širvinskas the Judge of Ukmergė Province, bought the Alančiai lands from the Voivode of Trakai, Marcjan Aleksander Ogiński. After the death of Širvinskas, his widow Petronėlė Talatovaitė and her four sons were forced to sell the manor in 1716 due to debts. In 1718, it was bought by Kazimieras Frackevičius-Radziminskis. In 1777, Alančiai was possessed by the Voivode of Smolensk, Jonas Franskevičius, a distant member of the Piłsudski family.

=== 19th–20th century ===
Coat of Arms of Rudamina family

In 1876 the manor was acquired by Antanas of the Rudamina family. The reputation of this old noble family is evidenced by the surviving place names (e.g. Rudamina near Vilnius). During the reign of Jogaila, Jokubavičius Rudamina was appointed the flag-bearer of the town of Rudamina. One of their family members, Andrius Rudamina was a famous missionary in China. Sources say that a portrait of Andrius Rudamina with Latin and Lithuanian inscriptions used to hang in a manor house and for a while in Jesuit University in Kraków.

After the death of Antanas Rudamina in 1884, the property was taken care of by his brother Ričardas, as the daughters of Antanas were still minors. When Rudamina's wife, Elena Rudaminienė-Žoltauskaitė, died in Florence in 1896, sisters Ieva and Marija-Magdalena Rudaminaitė became the only heirs of the estate. In 1909 they sponsored the building of Šilai Church of the Name of Jesus. At their request, a clearing was cut in the woods near the manor house as the sisters wanted to see the tower of the new church. The estate was famous for the production of openwork lace, which was sold to Italy, the United States and other countries.

The manor, before being nationalised by the occupying Soviet government in 1940, was owned by the children of Magdalena Rudaminaitė. At that time, 80 hectares belonged to the estate. Soon after, the Rudamina family left Lithuania, leaving behind Emilija Rudaminaitė, who was suffering from epilepsy. Surprisingly the Soviets didn't deport her to Siberia and she continued to live on the estate's grounds and care for the local people. Emilija Rudaminaitė died in poverty around 1950, she was buried in the manor's cemetery.

During World War II the manor was set on fire by the Red Army, in 1965 the roof and ceilings collapsed.

=== Recent history ===
After Lithuania regained independence in 1990, no descendants of Rudamina family made claims to the estate, and the manor was sold. Once again the manor changed owners frequently and the estate's building continued to deteriorate. In the 2000s the estate was purchased by Rimantas Gudelis, the owner of Bistrampolis Manor. He initiated the rebuilding of the manor house in 2012, but due to the lack of funds, the rebuilding never materialized.

In 2019 the estate was purchased by a local resident Ernestas Šešetas, who grew up near the manor. Under his ownership, the stable was rebuilt.

== Details ==
At the end of the 19th century, the manor estate complex consisted of eight buildings in addition to the manor house and the officina. At that time, the estate owned two hamlets, Pašilė and Pabėgė, with residential and farm buildings, and the Anitavas folwark.

In 1923, Alančiai Manor had 83 residents and tenants, and in 1940, a survey of the manor noted that the estate was exceptionally large, the park was old, and the grounds were accessed through a wide brick gate. It also states that the estate was almost empty as nearly all the residents had left.

Currently, the manor complex of only six buildings remains. However, two of them - the manor house and the officina - are in ruins. There is a large (14,7ha) park. The Alanta stream flows through its territory. The park has 13 native and 7 introduced tree species. The most common trees are oaks, black pines, European larches and large-leaved lindens.
