= Eustachy Wołłowicz =

Lithuanian bishop (1572–1630)

- Bishop of Vilnius
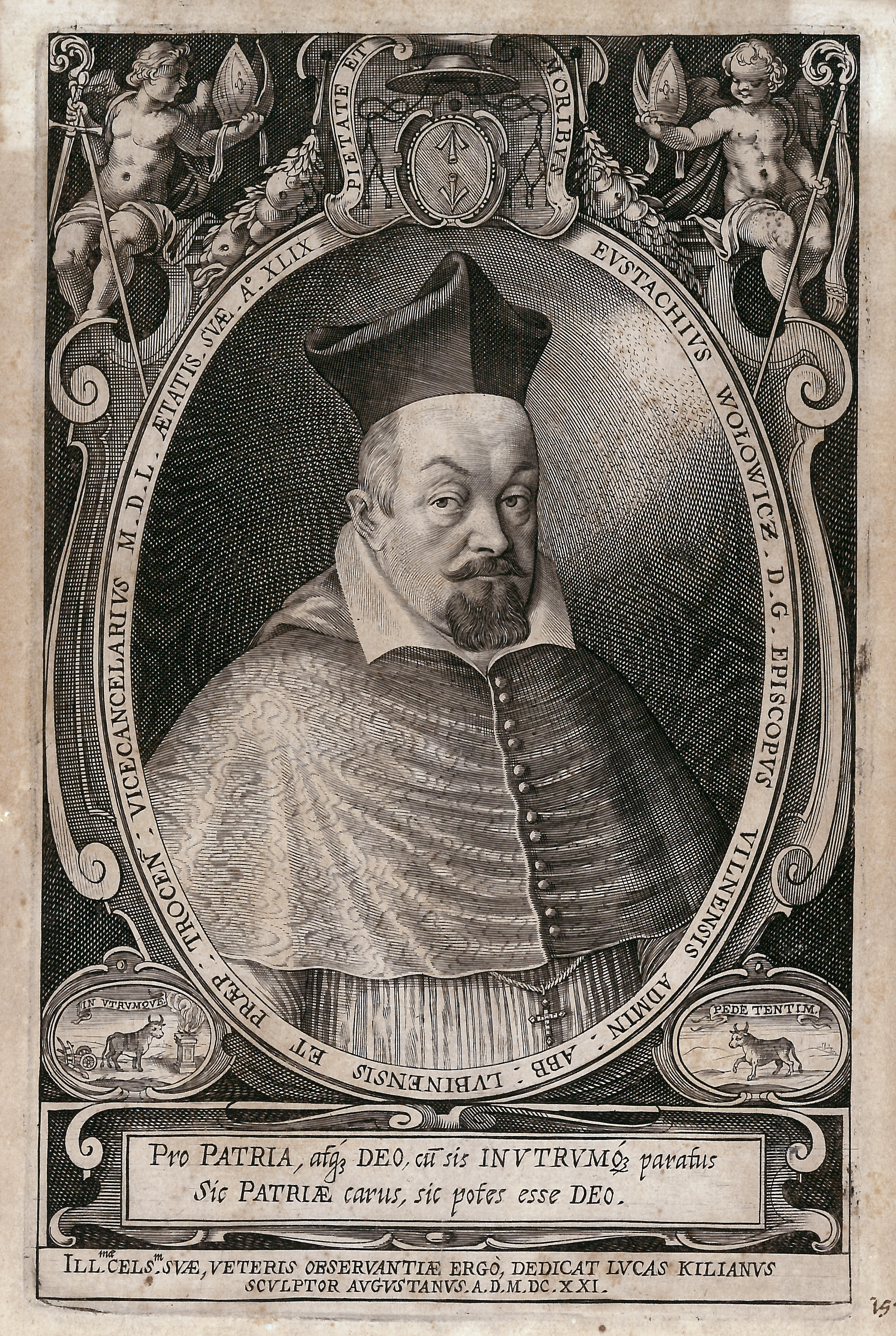
- Engraving by Lucas Kilian (1621)
- Church: Roman Catholic Church
- Diocese: Diocese of Vilnius
- Installed: 18 May 1616
- Term ended: 9 January 1630
- Predecessor: Benedykt Woyna
- Successor: Abraham Woyna

Orders
- Ordination: 1597
- Consecration: 9 October 1616

Personal details
- Born: 1572 Grand Duchy of Lithuania
- Died: 9 January 1630 (aged 57–58) Verkiai, Grand Duchy of Lithuania
- Buried: Vilnius Cathedral
- Denomination: Roman Catholic
- Parents: Ivan Wołłowicz
- Education: Vilnius University; Pontifical Gregorian University

Eustachy Wołłowicz (Lithuanian: Eustachijus Valavičius; 1572–1630) was Bishop of Vilnius in 1616–1630. He was one of the more accomplished bishops of Vilnius in the 17th century.

A son of the Protestant father and Eastern Orthodox mother, Wołłowicz became a Catholic and was educated at the Jesuit Academy of Vilnius and the Pontifical Gregorian University in Rome and was ordained as a priest. In 1600, Wołłowicz became a member of the Vilnius cathedral chapter and provost (praepositus) of Trakai. At the same time, entered the court of the Grand Duke Sigismund III Vasa becoming a referendary (a type of judge; 1600–1615), later royal secretary (1605–1615) and deputy chancellor (1615–1618). He was known as a skilled diplomat and politician. He became bishop of Vilnius after the death of Benedykt Woyna in 1615. As bishop, Wołłowicz organized three diocesan synods (1618, 1623, and 1626). He was supportive of the various religious orders and helped them establish new monasteries. He personally invited Canons Regular of the Lateran to Antakalnis, a suburb of Vilnius. In a 1625 report to the pope, he claimed that during his nine-year tenure as bishop, there were more than 40 new Catholic churches and 27 new monasteries established in the diocese. Despite his reputation of a sincerely religious man, he was known for his tolerant attitude towards the Protestants and support of the Ruthenian Uniate Church.

During his ad limina visit to Rome in 1620–1621, Wołłowicz obtained papal approval for the feast of Saint Casimir and discussed the proposed new faculties of law and medicine at the Jesuit Academy of Vilnius. He swapped his chapel at Vilnius Cathedral with that of the royal family so that the new Chapel of Saint Casimir could be built. He redecorated the old royal chapel and it is still known as the Wołłowicz Chapel. He was also known for his taste in art and made donations to several Catholic churches and monasteries, including Vilnius Cathedral, Church of the Visitation of the Blessed Virgin Mary in Trakai, Benedictine abbey in Lubiń, Benedictine Monastery in Tytuvėnai.

== Early life and education ==
Wołłowicz was born to a noble Wołłowicz family from the Grand Duchy of Lithuania. His father Ivan (died 1582), Court Marshal of Lithuania, was a Protestant while his mother was an Eastern Orthodox. His half-brother Hieronim Wołłowicz was Grand Treasurer of Lithuania and Elder of Samogitia. It is unknown when Wołłowicz became a Catholic. Likely it was during his studies at the Jesuit Academy of Vilnius. At the time he was also a member of the court of Bishop and Cardinal Jerzy Radziwiłł. In 1591, having taken the minor orders, Wołłowicz was given a parish in Slonim. A year later, he became parish priest of Odelsk and a canon of the Vilnius cathedral chapter.

Shortly after, he departed to Italy to study at several universities. In Rome, he studied at the Pontifical Gregorian University. He became subdeacon on 24 September 1594 at Trinità dei Monti and deacon on 13 April 1596 at the St. Mary's Chapel of the Pontifical Gregorian University. It is unknown when he was ordained as a priest. As a student, Wołłowicz was associated with Henryk Firlej, the future Archbishop of Gniezno. In December 1595, during the ceremony establishing the Union of Brest (whereby Ruthenian Orthodox Church dioceses in the Polish–Lithuanian Commonwealth placed themselves under the papal authority), Wołłowicz as an interpreter read a Ruthenian letter sent by the bishops to Pope Clement VIII. Wołłowicz received the title protonotary apostolic. His contemporaries testified that Wołłowicz also studied at the universities of Siena, Padua, Perugia, and even in Germany and France. But that information is fragmentary and lacks specifics. Only Jan Gostomski specified that Wołłowicz studied canon law at Perugia. Nevertheless, Wołłowicz earned a reputation as one of the best educated members of the clergy in the Grand Duchy.

== Government official ==
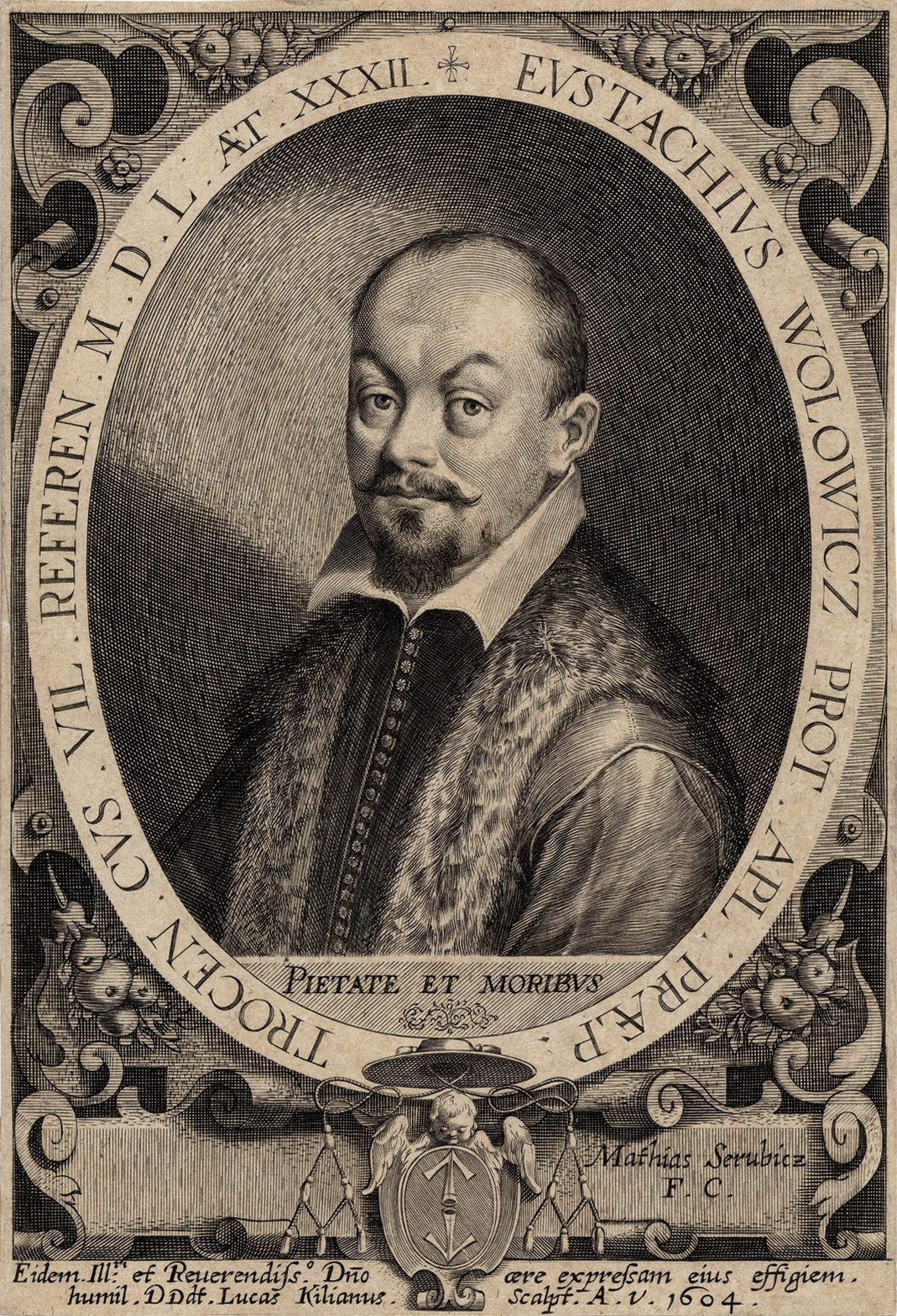
Engraving of Wołłowicz by Lucas Kilian (1604)

In May 1599, after about six years, Wołłowicz returned to Poland–Lithuania. After Benedykt Woyna became Bishop of Vilnius in 1600, Wołłowicz took over his benefices – custodian of church property (custos) at Vilnius cathedral chapter and provost (praepositus) of Trakai. For these new posts, Wołłowicz thanked Mikołaj Krzysztof "the Orphan" Radziwiłł. At the same time, likely via his half-brother Hieronim Wołłowicz, Wołłowicz entered the court of the Grand Duke Sigismund III Vasa. He became a referendary (a judge; 1600–1615) and later royal secretary (1605–1615). He inherited the secretary post from his brother when he became treasurer in 1605. In 1615, he became deputy chancellor, but had to give up the post in February 1618. Lithuanian nobles protested his appointment as Deputy Chancellor as he was a member of the clergy and traditionally clergymen were not elevated to chancellors which were automatically entitled to a seat in the Polish–Lithuanian Senate.

Preoccupied with the duties at the royal court, Wołłowicz rarely visited Vilnius and rarely participated in the affairs of the cathedral chapter, but was delegated by the chapter to the Sejm of the Polish–Lithuanian Commonwealth in 1600 and 1613. In Trakai, he organized reconstruction of the Church of the Visitation of the Blessed Virgin Mary which was becoming a pilgrimage center due to the miraculous icon of Our Lady of Trakai. He also established the Fellowship of the Rosary at the church in 1610–1612.

In 1607, Wołłowicz was sent on two diplomatic missions. In spring 1607, he traveled to Jędrzejów to negotiate with the Zebrzydowski rebels. While peace was not achieved, he was sent in fall 1607 to Tyniec where rebellious Benedictines refused to accept new abbot appointed by the king. Accompanied by soldiers, Wołłowicz surrounded the monastery. He feigned a retreat, but returned in the morning when monks were still sleeping after a celebration of their "victory" the night before. Wołłowicz's soldiers broke into the abbey and the monks were forced to accept the king-appointed abbot.

In 1608, Wołłowicz was appointed commendatory abbot of the Benedictine abbey in Lubiń near Krzywiń. It was a rare occurrence for a Lithuanian noble to become an abbot in Poland; only four other Bishops of Vilnius were granted such benefices. Wołłowicz took an active role in administering the monastery and visited it several times. A manuscript produced by a monk records his good deeds: he constructed the dormitory, commissioned the main altar with a tabernacle, gifted expensive church vestments and liturgical objects, transferred abbot's house in Poznań to the abbey, ordered repairs to monastery buildings, improved discipline, paid salary to an official tasked with resolving monastery's lawsuits, appointed visitators to oversee monks and provosts living outside the abbey, etc. One of the key accomplishments was obtaining papal approval to clearly segregate monastery's and abbot's income and property.

Surviving correspondence shows that Wołłowicz corresponded and collaborated with various Lithuanian magnates, including Grand Chancellor Lew Sapieha and Calvinist Krzysztof Radziwiłł. Wołłowicz was particularly close with Mikołaj Krzysztof "the Orphan" Radziwiłł – he lived with Radziwiłł's sons in Augsburg for a few months in 1604. Wołłowicz spent considerable amount of time outside of the Grand Duchy of Lithuania (about 20 years) and was more familiar with Polish dignitaries. Nine out of ten recommendations submitted to the pope when he was considered for bishops were written by Polish nobles. In turn, Wołłowicz supported several lesser nobles, including the Jesuit poet Maciej Kazimierz Sarbiewski (who dedicated several poems to Wołłowicz), his distant relative and the first Lithuanian missionary to China Andrius Rudamina, distant relative and future bishop of Samogitia and Vilnius Jerzy Tyszkiewicz, auxiliary bishop of Vilnius and titular bishop of Methone Stanisław Nieborski.

== Bishop ==
=== Official duties and trip to Rome ===
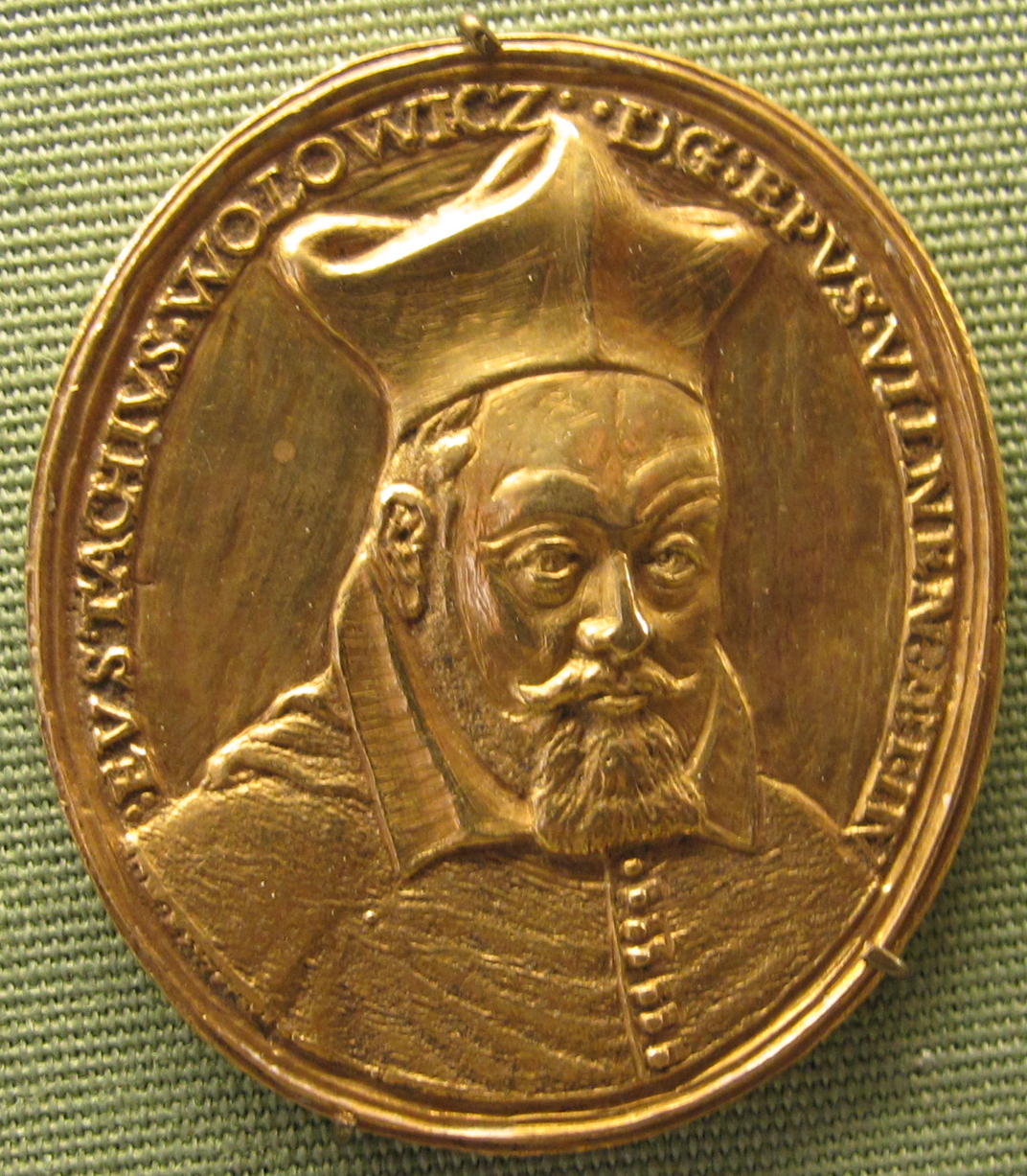
Gold medal with portrait of Wołłowicz (1626)

After the death of Benedykt Woyna in October 1615, Wołłowicz was nominated for Bishop of Vilnius without much opposition. The papal approval was granted on 18 May 1616 and Wołłowicz was consecrated on 9 October 1616 in Warsaw. After becoming bishop, he gave up only the office of the custodian of church property (custos) at Vilnius cathedral chapter, and continued as provost of Trakai and abbot of Lubiń. He continued as Deputy Chancellor of the Grand Duchy of Lithuania until February 1618 and thus was little visible as bishop. After his resignation in 1618, he organized a diocesan synod, visited churches in Vilnius, created Archdeaconry of White Ruthenia usually governed by the dean of Aboĺcy, and initiated construction of a house for retired clergy.

In 1620–1621, he made ad limina visit to Rome which interrupted his work in the diocese. During the trip, Wołłowicz petitioned the pope to add the feast of Saint Casimir, patron Saint of Lithuania, to the Roman Breviary and Roman Missal. The Sacred Congregation of Rites agreed, but classified the feast at the lowest simplex level. Wołłowicz resubmitted the petition and this time it was granted higher semiduplex status on 3 March 1621. It was the same status as of the feast day of Saint Stanislaus of Szczepanów, patron saint of Poland. Wołłowicz also obtained papal approvals to increase the number of confessors who could grant absolution for heresy (this was needed for people converting from Eastern Orthodoxy or Protestantism to Catholicism) as well as the right for seven churches in Vilnius to grant same indulgences as granted by seven churches in Rome. There are hints that Wołłowicz also had diplomatic tasks related to the struggle against the Ottoman Empire, but there is no evidence that anything was achieved. Suffering from gout, Wołłowicz spent some time improving his health in hot springs of Padua where his ill second cousin Mikołaj Pac, former Bishop of Samogitia, resided.

After his return from Rome, Wołłowicz became more sedentary living mostly in Vilnius and Verkiai. He had long complained of poor health and suffered from grout since at least 1604. He traveled to the Sejm of the Polish–Lithuanian Commonwealth in 1623, 1626, 1627, 1628, but was late to the last three and missed several others. Overall, he attended only half of the 14 Sejms during his tenure as bishop; he missed the Sejms due to his trip to Rome in 1620–1621 and likely due to a plague outbreak in 1624–1625. Around 1618, Wołłowicz and Wawrzyniec Gembicki, Primate of Poland, signed an instruction for diplomatic envoys to Moscow during the Polish–Muscovite War (1605–1618). It was the only time in history that Bishop of Vilnius acted almost like the Primate of Lithuania and an equal to Primate of Poland.

=== Religious policies ===
Wołłowicz organized three diocesan synods (1618, 1623, and 1626), but unlike his predecessor did not publish any of their decisions. The Council of Trent required bishops to visit and inspect their dioceses at least every two years. There is no evidence that Wołłowicz visited churches in the Diocese of Vilnius other than the churches in Vilnius in 1618. In a 1625 report to the pope, Wołłowicz claimed that made deaneries more active – deans visited their parishes every three months and called synods twice a year. He also claimed that in nine years that he became bishop, more than 40 Catholic churches were built in the diocese. At least two churches were retaken from the Protestants, in Kėdainiai (1627) and in Deltuva (1628). Overall, Wołłowicz was tolerant towards the Protestants and worked with Calvinist supporters Krzysztof Radziwiłł and Janusz Radziwiłł to find peaceful solutions and avoid violent clashes. For such policies, Wołłowicz even earned a nickname "heretic bishop". He was also supportive of the Ruthenian Uniate Church which was established by the Union of Brest in 1595. He allowed the uniates to keep their liturgical calendar, participated in the first uniate synod in Kobryn, and was tasked to pursue beatification of Josaphat Kuntsevych who was murdered by an anti-union mob in 1623. He was less tolerant towards Eastern Orthodoxs – he forbade the construction of the Orthodox Church of the Holy Spirit in Vilnius in 1625 and 1628 even though land for the church was donated by his relatives.

Wołłowicz was very supportive of different Catholic religious orders and their monasteries. In 1625, he claimed that 27 new monasteries were established in Lithuania during his nine-year tenure as bishop. The following year, he claimed 40 new monasteries. During his tenure, Discalced Carmelites and Canons Regular of the Lateran first established their presence in Lithuania. He invited Canons Regular to Antakalnis, then suburb of Vilnius, but did not provide them with a benefice. They survived in Antakalnis only with the help of Wołłowicz's successor Abraham Woyna as well as donations from Józef Korsak and Michał Kazimierz Pac. Wołłowicz was particularly supportive of the women Benedictines and helped them establish their monastery in Vilnius and take over the Church of Saint Nicholas in Kaunas. He also translated and supplemented the Rule of Saint Benedict adopting it to Lithuanian realities. These rules were first published in 1884 and were still used until the early 20th century. Some traditions still practiced by the Benedictines in Lithuania can be traced to Wołłowicz's rules. For some reason, Wołłowicz was not supportive of the Dominican Order and on a couple occasions delayed or denied his approval for their monasteries.

His relationship with the cathedral chapter became more tense in 1628–1629. The chapter claimed that the bishop did not provide enough funds for the upkeep of Vilnius Cathedral while Wołłowicz wanted to introduce new position of a chancellor to the chapter. His death in early 1630 left the conflict unresolved.

== Sponsor of education and art ==
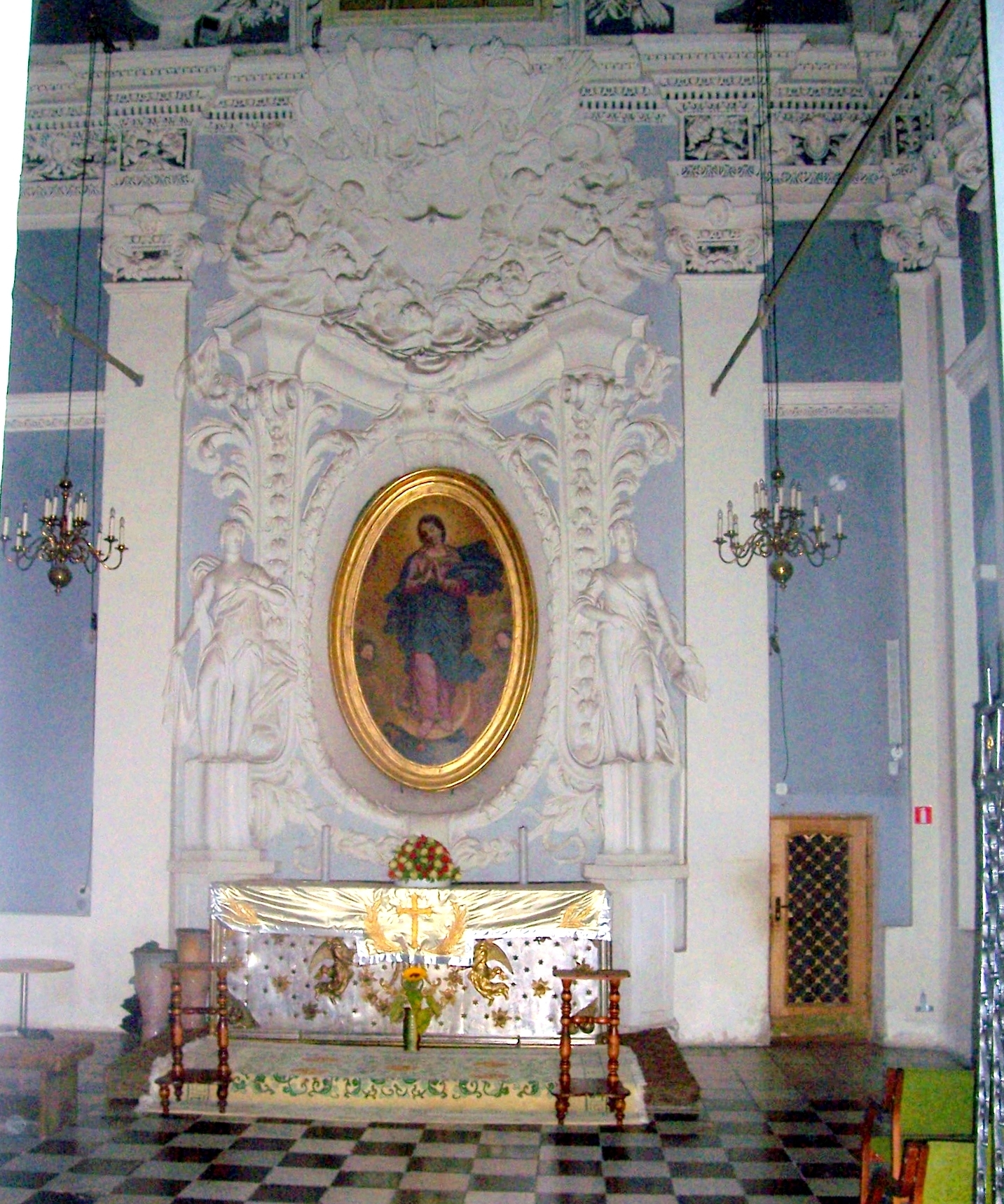
Interior of the Wołłowicz Chapel in Vilnius Cathedral

Wołłowicz was well educated and valued education. Together with his brother Hieronim Wołłowicz, he supported the plans to establish faculties of law and medicine at the Jesuit Academy in Vilnius. Such faculties were not present in other Jesuit institutions and thus were met with resistance. Wołłowicz discussed the issue during his trip to Rome in 1620–1621 and Superior General Mutio Vitelleschi approved the faculties as an exception in early 1623. However, the faculties were not established at this time – Kazimierz Leon Sapieha funded the law faculty in 1641 and it opened in 1644. Wołłowicz also collected books – some of them bear inscriptions that they were gifts by the authors, such as Matthew Rader or Justus Lipsius. Surviving copies are kept at the Vilnius University Library. He also sponsored a Latin translations of a religious work by Pietro Giustinelli (published twice in 1624 and 1629) that was intended for the Lithuanian clergy. Konstantinas Sirvydas dedicated his collection of Lithuanian-language sermons Punktai Sakymų to Wołłowicz. A religious booklet with prayers and recollections about Jesus Christ was published by a Franciscan friar in Padua in 1620 and was also dedicated to Wołłowicz. He also sponsored the publication of two non-religious books – a Polish-language sermon delivered by Mateusz Bembus during the funeral of the royal secretary Andrzej Bobola (published in 1629) and a Polish translation of a work by Marco Antonio de Dominis explaining his reasons for leaving England.

The bishop was also known for his taste in art. In 1604, he commissioned an engraving of Pieta by Lucas Kilian. Wołłowicz also commissioned four high quality portrait engravings by Kilian (in 1604, two in 1618, and in 1621). This is a stark departure from his predecessors who had only one often low-quality official portrait painting. When his brothers funded the Benedictine Monastery in Tytuvėnai, Wołłowicz gifted it with a painting of the Mother of God for the main altar and co-sponsored its church bell. Wołłowicz paid 50 złoty to a local unknown artist in Vilnius making the painting one of the oldest known surviving paintings produced in the city. He also likely gifted doors of a church tabernacle by Matthias Wallbaum, goldsmith from Augsburg, to Vilnius Cathedral. His largest commission was the Wołłowicz Chapel in Vilnius Cathedral. In 1612, he was allowed to construct the chapel. It originally stood to the right of the main altar. However, the royal family was looking for a better place to house the relics of Saint Casimir. In 1624, Wołłowicz agreed to swap chapels with the royal family – his old chapel was demolished to make way for the Chapel of Saint Casimir while he remodeled the former royal chapel to the left of the entrance. He was buried in the chapel and his epitaph survives to this day. Wołłowicz also remodeled Verkiai Palace, summer residence of the bishops of Vilnius – he rebuilt the residence, established gardens with a drainage system that lifted water from the Neris River, and decorated the palace interior with 84 religious inscriptions. The reconstruction was described in a Latin poem by Franciscus Sitański (Sitanius) published in 1626.

He organized construction of a house for retired and ill clergy; it was eventually built near the Church of the Holy Cross. Likely, he initiated or at least supported the establishment of a primitive hospital (Lithuanian: špitolė) of Joseph of Arimathea and Nicodem in Vilnius during the 1624–1625 plague outbreak. Wołłowicz gifted relics of Saint Eustace (his namesake) and of Saint Benno as well as a belt or sash of Saint Mary from Augsburg to Vilnius Cathedral.

== Bibliography ==
- Grinčalaitis, Vaidas (2018). "Eustachijaus Valavičiaus ir Leono Sapiegos laiškai Justui Lipsijui 1604–1606 metais". Darbai ir dienos (in Lithuanian). 70: 235–250. doi:10.7220/2335-8769.70.11. ISSN 2335-8769.
- Jovaiša, Liudas (2018). "Eustachijus Valavičius: neįvertinto herojaus curriculum vitae" (PDF). Bažnyčios istorijos studijos (in Lithuanian). 9: 82–167. ISSN 1392-0502.
- Kamuntavičienė, Vaida (June 2014). "Šv. Benedikto regulos adaptacija Lietuvos Didžiosios Kunigaikštystės benediktinių vienuolynuose" (PDF). Logos (in Lithuanian). 79. ISSN 0868-7692.
- Rėklaitis, Povilas (March 1958). "Šv. Kazimiero koplyčia Vilniuje (I)". Aidai (in Lithuanian). 3 (108). ISSN 0002-208X.
- Vaineikis, Algimantas; Kaupienė, Birutė; Derkintis, Rimvydas (2008). "Tytuvėnų bažnyčios paveikslo "Švč. Mergelė Marija su Vaikeliu", puošto metaliniais aptaisais ir karūnomis, istorinė apžvalga ir restauravimas" (PDF). Lietuvos dailės muziejaus metraštis. 11. ISSN 1648-6706.
- Vitkauskienė, Birutė Rūta (2009). "Vilniaus vyskupo Eustachijaus Valavičiaus rezidencija Verkiuose" (PDF). Acta Academiae Artium Vilnensis (in Lithuanian). 55. ISSN 1392-0316.

Catholic Church titles
Preceded by Benedykt Woyna	Bishop of Vilnius; 1616–1630	Succeeded by Abraham Woyna
