= Jesuit College in Poznań =

Former college in Poznań, Poland

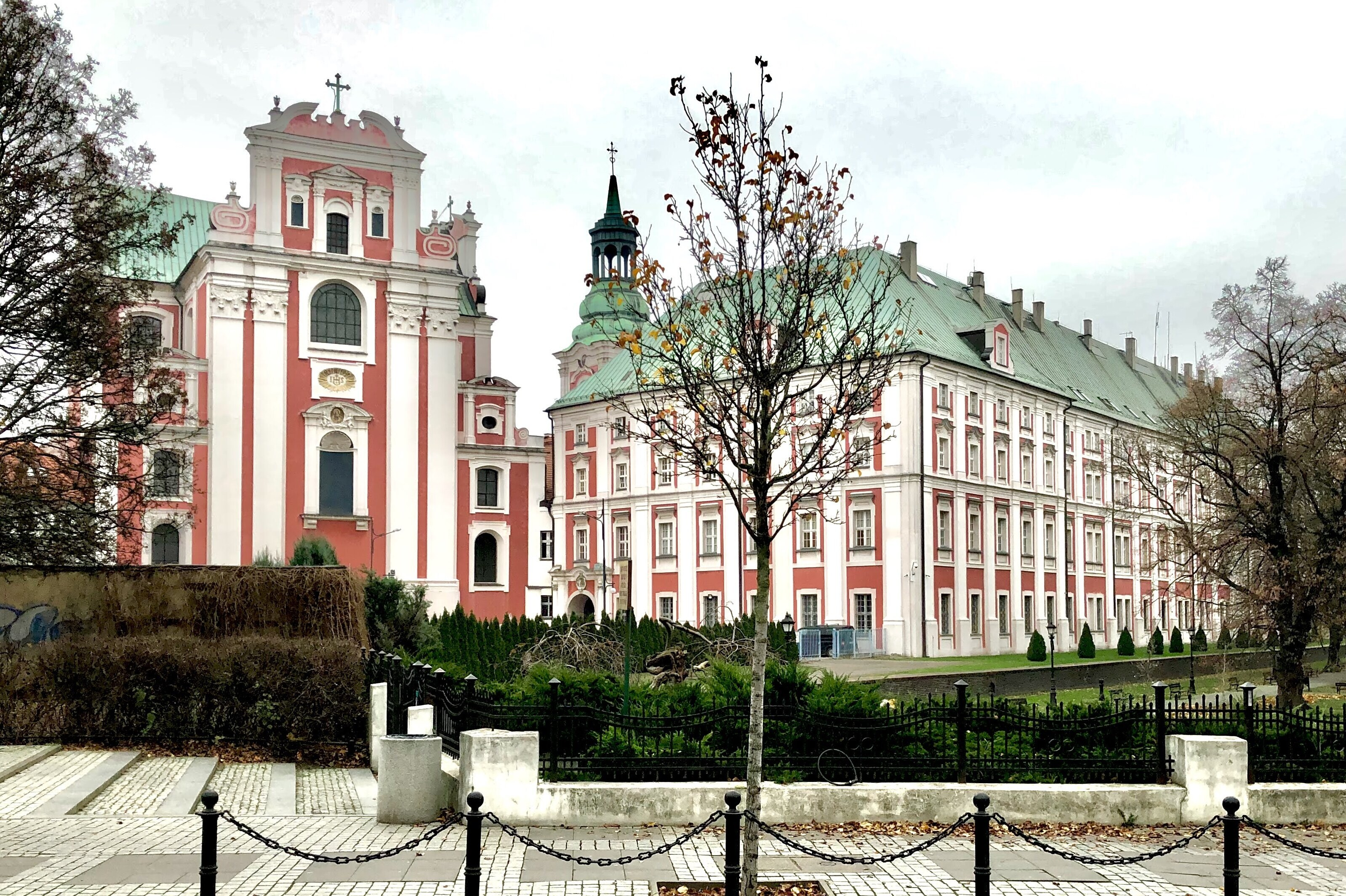
Buildings of the Jesuit College

The Jesuit College in Poznań (Polish: Kolegium jezuitów w Poznaniu) was a university founded by members of the Jesuit Order in Poznań, Poland. It survived from 1572 to 1773 in what was then the Polish–Lithuanian Commonwealth.

== History ==
The college and its library were founded in 1572 by Bishop Adam Konarski. According to historians Stanisław Załęski and Albert Pollard, the Order experienced notable early success in Poznań, and this was due in part to Bishop Konarski's ability to generate financial and social support from the local community. The city provided buildings for the college, and over 100 individuals donated books to the college in the first decades. Other individuals associated with the founding include Fr. Wujek and several Jesuit priests. In its early years, the college also managed to attract lecturers from Scotland, including James Bosgrave and William Ogilvie.

The founding of the college in Poznań caused controversy with the Kraków Academy, which considered itself to be dominant over other educational institutions. The Kraków Academy managed to close a Jesuit college in Kraków and stall the elevation of the college in Poznań to university status.

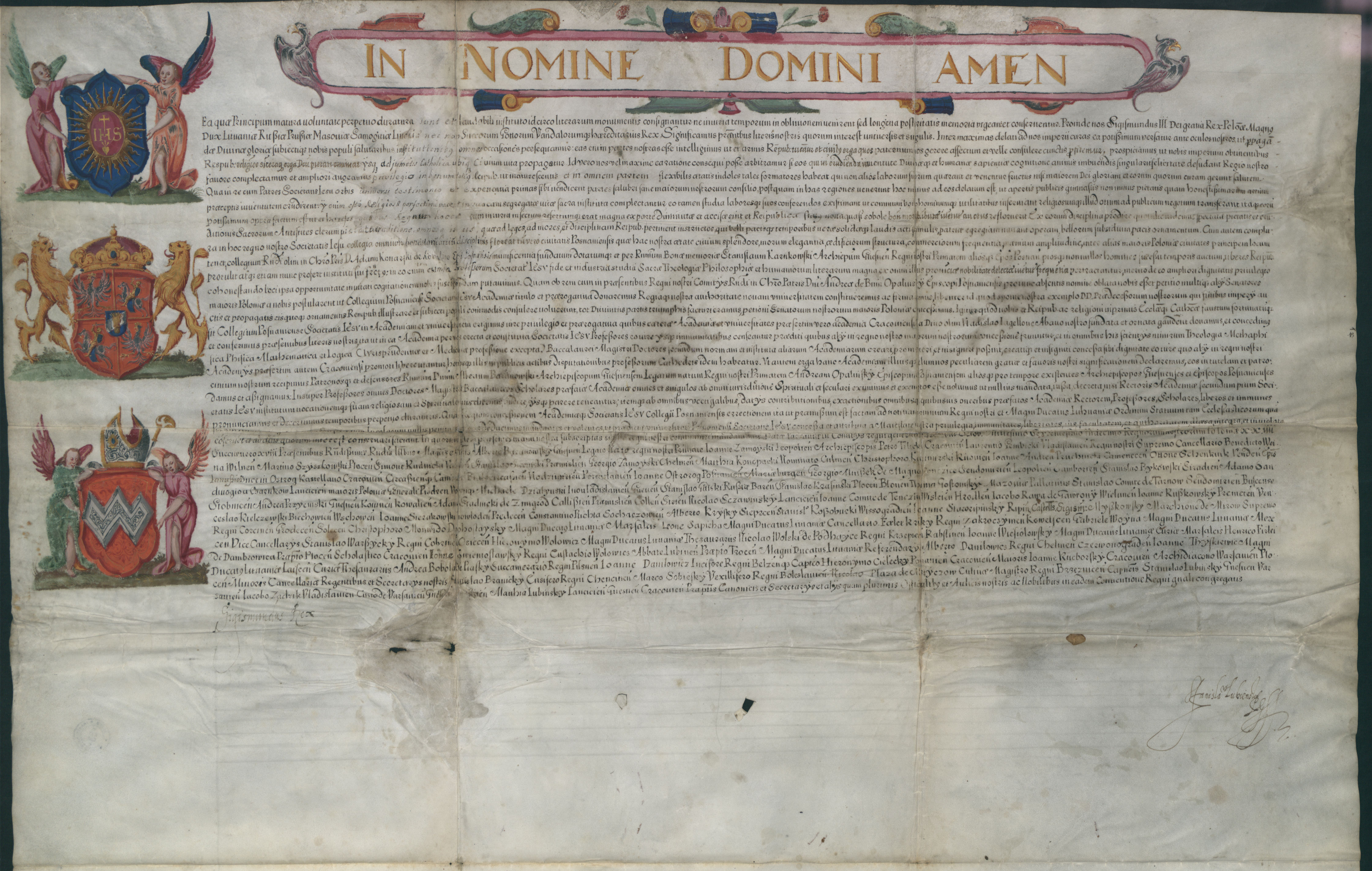
An original record of King Sigismund's elevation of the college

The college was eventually elevated to the status of a university in the 17th century by King Sigismund Vasa. In 1655, during the Deluge, the Swedish army entered Poznań and confiscated the contents of the library at the college. The volumes were transferred to the library at Uppsala University through Claes Rålamb. By 1700, the college also operated a printing house.

In 1773, the National Education Commission shut down both the Jesuit college and the neighboring Lubrański Academy. By the 1780s, the National Education Commission restructured the Jesuit college into a high school. Several of the Jesuit buildings are used in the modern period to house the local government.

== Notable rectors ==
- Arthur Faunt
- Jakub Wujek, creator of the Wujek Bible
- Kasper Drużbicki
- Mateusz Bembus
- Wojciech Bystrzonowski

== Notable students ==
- Bernard of Wąbrzeźno
- Augustyn Kordecki

== See also ==
- List of Jesuit sites
- Jesuit College in Polotsk
- Jesuit College in Khyriv
