= Tomasz Młodzianowski =

Polish Jesuit, preacher, and writer

The Reverend Tomasz Młodzianowski
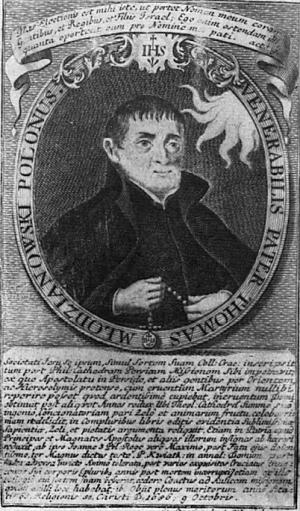
- Portrait with Latin motto: For he is a chosen vessel unto Me, to bear My name before the Gentiles and kings, and the children of Israel; for I will shew him how great things he must suffer for My name's sake (Acts 9:15-16).
- Born: 21 December 1622; Ciechanów
- Died: 9 October 1686 (aged 63); Wolbrom
- Occupations: Cleric; theologian; academic; author

Ecclesiastical career
- Religion: Catholic
- Church: Catholic Church in Poland
- Ordained: 1648
- Writings: Kazania i Homilyie
- Congregations: Jesuits
- Offices held: Rector of Jesuit College in Poznań

Dąbrowa coat of arms of Młodzianowski family

Tomasz Młodzianowski (Dąbrowa coat of arms; 21 December 1622 – 3 or 9 October 1686) was a Polish Jesuit, preacher, and writer.

== Life ==
Młodzianowski was born on 21 December 1622 near Ciechanów. He was a member of Mazovian yeomanry (drobna szlachta). In 1637 he began the Jesuit novitiate. In 1648 he received the holy orders. From 1654 to 1656 he was a missionary in Isfahan. While coming back he visited the Holy Land. He has been a lecturer in the colleges in various cities of the Polish–Lithuanian Commonwealth and a chaplain. In 1673 he became the deputy provincial. From 1680 to 1683 he was the rector in the college in Poznań.

Młodzianowski died on 3 or 9 October 1686 in Wolbrom. After his death, King John III Sobieski said: "The order of the Society has a great loss in this man." He was buried in the church of saint Peter and Paul in Kraków.

== Works ==
He won the fame of a great preacher. In 1674 he was speaking in the coronation mass of John III Sobieski. He has written down 73 homilies and 179 sermons. He used to publish occasional speeches separately. The rest is collected in his Kazania i Homilie (Poznań 1681), with over 2,000 pages in folio in four volumes. He used to avoid macaronic language, speak clearly, make the lecture interesting through concepts, explain abstract ideas to the audience (e.g. comparing the apostles to the MPs), include proverbs. His other works are:

- Praelectiones (1666-1674) – a series of handbooks presenting full theology and philosophy
- Integer cursus theologicus et philosophicus – a revised and expanded version of the above
- Rozmyślania albo Lekcya duchowna – meditations, in 1680-1754 published 6 times
- Akty przygotowania się na śmierć – about good death, between 1685 and 1758 edited 7 times

== See also ==
- Mikołaj Łęczycki
- Kasper Drużbicki
- Daniel Pawłowski
- Jan Morawski

== Bibliography ==
- Nowy Korbut, ed. Roman Pollak, v. 2, Warsaw 1964, pp. 526–527.
- Kasper Niesiecki, Herbarz polski, v. VI, Leipzig 1841, pp. 427–429.
