= Pawłowski =

Pawłowski (Polish pronunciation: [paˈvwɔfski]; feminine: Pawłowska; plural: Pawłowscy) is a Polish surname derived from the given name Paweł (Paul). In some cases, it is a noble surname derived from villages named Pawłowo. It is ranked about 20th in the list of the most common Polish surnames, with more than 50,000 carriers. It is popular especially in the mid-northern part of the country.

Language	Masculine	Feminine
Polish	Pawłowski	Pawłowska
Belarusian (Romanization)	Паўлоўскі (Paŭloŭski)	Паўлоўская (Paŭloŭskaja, Paulouskaya, Paulouskaia)
Latvian	Pavlovskis	Pavlovska
Lithuanian	Paulauskas	Paulauskienė (married); Paulauskaitė (unmarried)
Russian (Romanization)	Павловский (Pavlovsky, Pavlovskiy, Pavlovskij)	Павловская (Pavlovskaya, Pavlovskaia, Pavlovskaja)
Ukrainian (Romanization)	Павловський (Pavlovskyi, Pavlovskyy, Pavlovskyj)	Павловська (Pavlovska)

== People ==
- Artur Pawlowski, Polish-Canadian street preacher and right-wing activist
- Bartłomiej Pawłowski, Polish footballer
- Bogumił Pawłowski (1898–1971), Polish botanist
- Chris Pavlovski, Rumble (website) founder
- Daniel Pawłowski (1627–1673), Jesuit preacher and writer
- Dariusz Pawłowski, Polish footballer
- Ed Pawlowski, American politician
- Felix W. Pawlowski of the Early Birds of Aviation
- Frank Pawlowski, American politician
- Jan Pawłowski (born 1992), Polish footballer
- Jan Romeo Pawlowski (born 1960), Polish archbishop, diplomat
- John Pawlowski (born 1963), American baseball coach
- Jerzy Pawłowski (1932–2005), Polish fencer
- Katarzyna Pawłowska (born 1989), Polish cyclist
- Łukasz Pawłowski (born 1983), Polish rower
- Mateusz Pawłowski (born 2004), Polish actor
- Mauro Pawlowski (born 1971), Belgian musician
- Monika Pawłowska (born 1983), Polish politician
- Piotr Pawłowski (canoeist) (born 1959), Polish canoer
- Ryszard Pawłowski (born 1950), Polish mountain climber
- Sylwester Pawłowski (born 1958), Polish politician
- Szymon Pawłowski (born 1978), Polish politician
- Szymon Pawłowski (born 1986), Polish footballer
- Tadeusz Pawłowski (born 1953), Polish football player and manager
- Wladimir von Pawlowski (1891–1961), Austrian Nazi politician
- Wojciech Pawłowski, Polish footballer
