= Silai =

Silai may refer to:

- Šilai (disambiguation), various villages in Lithuania
- Silai Temple, a place of the Silai Temple Incident
- Ileana Silai (1941–2025), a Romanian middle-distance runner
- Shilabati River
