= Laurence Cade =

Roman Catholic seminarist

- Occupation: Roman Catholic seminarist

Laurence Cade (fl. 1583), or Laurence Caddy, was a Roman Catholic seminarist.

== Biography ==
Cade was considered a gentleman of a good family, and received his education at Trinity College, Cambridge, but does not appear to have graduated. On becoming a Roman Catholic he went abroad, and was admitted into the English College of Douay on 11 June 1578. Soon after his return to England he was apprehended, and being unwilling to answer such questions as were put to him, he was committed to the Tower. His relatives and friends brought him back to the Church of England, and in 1581 he recanted at St. Paul's Cross and regained his liberty, but before long he returned to the Catholic religion, and in April 1583 he was preparing himself for admission among the Carmelites at Paris. The "Palinodia" which he published at this period is printed in John Bridgewater's "Concertatio Ecclesiæ Catholicæ in Anglia." Dodd states that he "was very instrumental in moderating the fury of John Nicols, who, having also been a student at Rome, had prevaricated, and not only published several scandalous libels against the Catholics abroad, but was contriving to do that party all the mischief he could by turning priest-catcher."
