= Rudamina Eldership =

Rudamina Eldership Rudaminos seniūnija
- Eldership
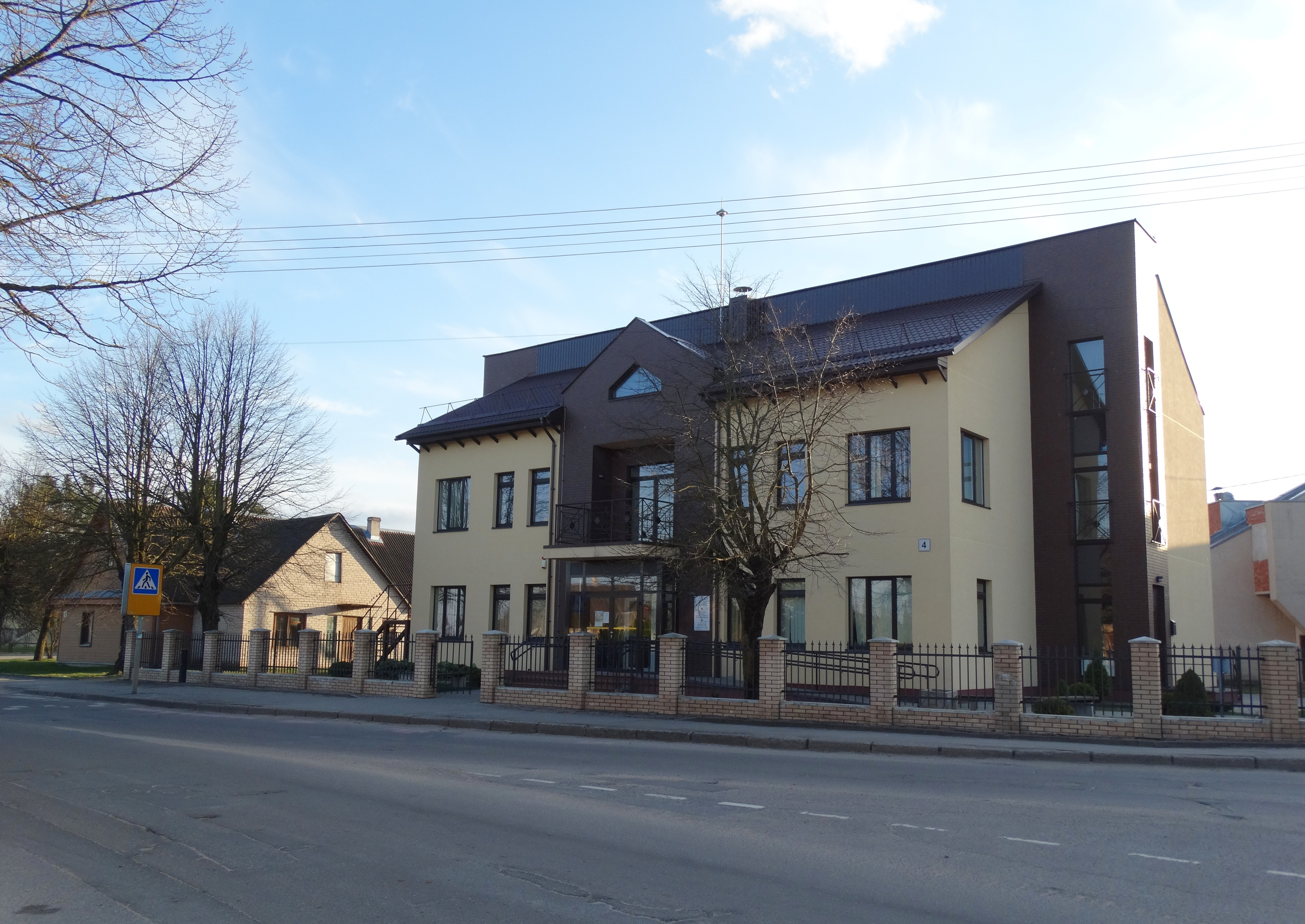
- Administration building

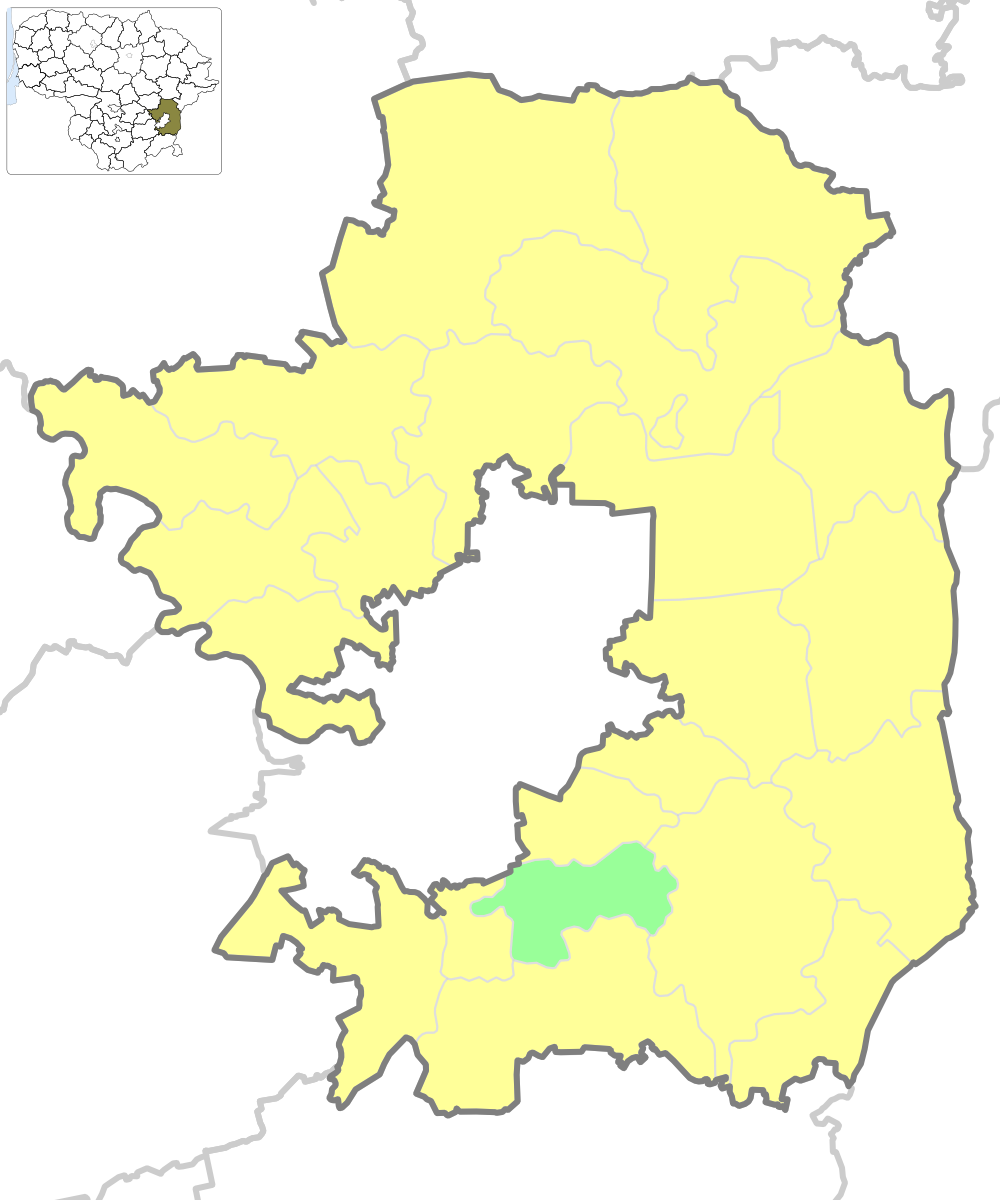
- Location of Rudamina Eldership
- Country: Lithuania
- Ethnographic region: Dzūkija
- County: Vilnius County
- Municipality: Vilnius District Municipality
- Administrative centre: Rudamina

Area
  - Total: 47 km^{2} (18 sq mi)

Population
  - Total: 5,769
  - Density: 120/km^{2} (320/sq mi)
- Time zone: UTC+2 (EET)
  - Summer (DST): UTC+3 (EEST)
- Website: https://www.vrsa.lt

Rudamina Eldership (Lithuanian: Rudaminos seniūnija) is an eldership in Lithuania, located in Vilnius District Municipality, east of Vilnius.

== Ethnic composition ==
According to 2011 National Census data, the ethnic composition is as follows:

- Poles - 51%
- Lithuanians - 32%
- Belarusians - 9%
