= Šilai =

Šilai (lit. 'pine forest') is the name for a number of settlements in Lithuania. It may refer to:

- Šilai, Akmenė District Municipality
- Šilai, Skiemonys, Anykščiai District Municipality
- Šilai, Viešintos, Anykščiai District Municipality
- Šilai, Biržai District Municipality
- Šilai, Jonava District Municipality
- Šilai, Pakruojis District Municipality
- Šilai, Jonava District Municipality
- Šilai, Krekenava, Panevėžys District Municipality
- Šilai, Panevėžys District Municipality – town
- Šilai, Raguva, Panevėžys District Municipality
- Šilai, Šaukotas, Radviliškis District Municipality
- Šilai, Šiaulėnai, Radviliški District Municipality
- Šilai, Raseiniai District Municipality
- Šilai, Rokiškis District Municipality
- Šilai, Šilalė District Municipality
- Šilai, Šilutė District Municipality
- Šilai, Luokė, Telšiai District Municipality
- Šilai, Žarėnai, Telšiai District Municipality
- Šilai, Zarasai District Municipality
