= Slavery to Mary =

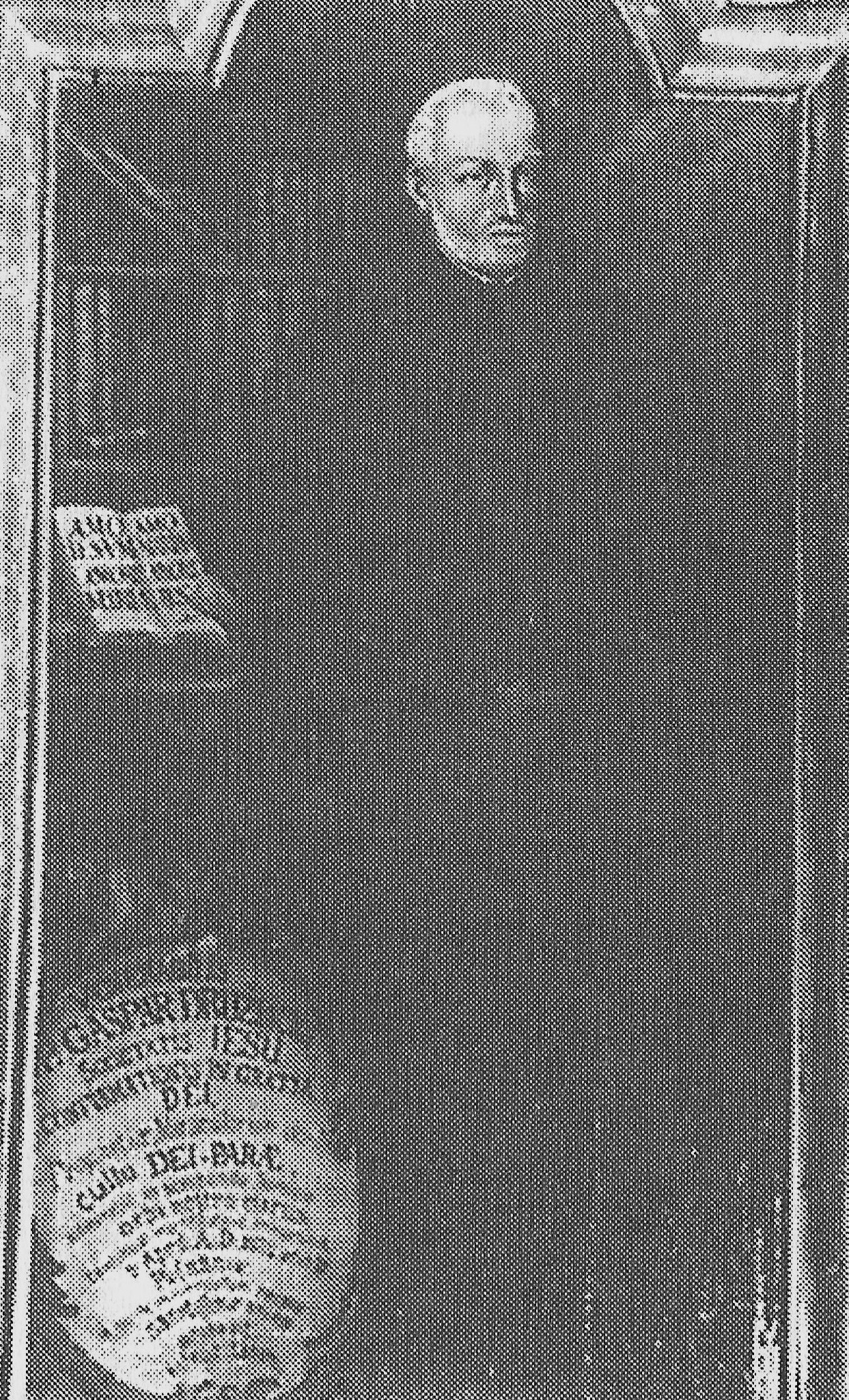
Portrait of Kasper Drużbicki in Poznań old parish church with Latin motto: I love Jesus with the love of Mary; I love Mary with the love of Jesus

Mancipium Mariae (Latin the slavery/a slave of Mary) is a Christian devotion.

Its rules, referring to older traditions, were formulated from the inspiration of Jesuit Kasper Drużbicki in following works:

- Franciscus Phoenicius (Franciszek Stanisław Fenicki), Mariae mancipium, Lublin 1632
- Jan Chomentowski (Chomętowski), Pętko Panny Maryjej albo sposób oddawania się Błogosławionej Pannie Marii za sługę i niewolnika, Lublin 1632

In ancient Rome, mancipium meant the relation of subjection of one person to another, existing because of mancipatio (the reverse process is the emancipation), as well as a person subjected thus.

The devotion consisted on the act of yielding oneself prisoner to the Mother of God – of subjection to her will. Each slave of Mary had also the duty of praying a litany in the morning and evening and an office on Saturday. The sign of the slavery was a fetters-shaped chainlet with the inscription ego mancipium Mariae.

This sort of piety gained a great popularity in the age of Baroque (perhaps, among others, Wespazjan Kochowski used to practise it) and had a significant impact on the development of Marian veneration in the Church.

== See also ==
- Kasper Drużbicki
- Louis de Montfort
- Immaculate Heart of Mary
- Sacred Heart
- Miraculous Medal
- Stefan Wyszyński
- Totus Tuus

== Bibliography ==
- Encyklopedia wiedzy o jezuitach na ziemiach Polski i Litwy. 1564-1995, Ludwik Grzebień (ed.), Kraków 1996.
- Karol Górski, Zarys dziejów duchowości w Polsce, Kraków 1986.
- Maria Eustachiewicz, "Wstęp", Wespazjan Kochowski, Utwory poetyckie. Wybór, Wrocław–Warsaw–Kraków 1991, p. III-LXXX.
