= Mikołaj Łęczycki =

Polish Catholic theologian, writer and mystic (1574–1653)

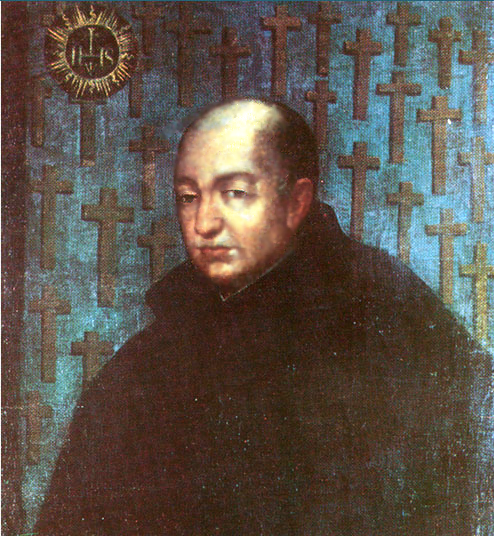
Mikołaj Łęczycki

Mikołaj Łęczycki (coat of arms: Niesobia), in Latin Nicolaus Lancicius (December 10, 1574 – March 30, 1653) was a Polish Jesuit, Catholic theologian, writer and mystic.

== Life ==
Łęczycki was born near Nesvizh, the son of a printer Daniel of Łęczyca and Katarzyna Gotart. At the age of 18, Łęczycki converted from Calvinism to Catholicism, and persuaded his father to do it as well. On February 17, 1592, he entered the Society of Jesus. He spent several years in Rome, where he was studying and working with Niccolò Orlandini in the congregation's central archive to compile the history of Jesuits. During the stay, he received the holy orders on April 14, 1601. Łęczycki returned to Polish–Lithuanian Commonwealth in 1607, bringing many relics for Jesuit churches. He was a professor at the Vilnius University and Lviv college, the rector in Kalisz and Kraków, then he was working in Nesvizh, Braniewo, and what is now the Czech Republic. He was serving as a provincial for Lithuania and visited Rome several times. He was commonly considered a master of the spiritual life and a worker of miracles such as revelation, prophecy, healing, levitation, psychokinesis and bilocation. He died in Kaunas.

== Writings ==
He was the author of many theological writings, published together by Jean Bolland in two volumes as Opuscula spiritualia (Antwerp 1650) and separately many times all over Europe. The most important are:

- De piis erga Deum et coelites affectibus – a diary, with several editions under various titles and in translations to Polish, English, French, German and Czech
- Florilegium piarum meditationum (Vilnius 1713)
- Insignis conversio Mariae Bonaventurae monialis Romanae
- De officiis sacerdotum
- De conditionibus boni superioris
- Dissertatio historica et theologica de praestantia Instituti Societatis Jesu
- De recta traducenda adolescentia
- De exteriore corporis compositione
- De humanarum passionum dominio
- Medytacje nowym i doskonałym sposobem na każdy dzień roku rozłożone i na święta znamienitsze (Vilnius 1723)
- Koło rycerskie rocznego obrotu (Vilnius 1727)

== See also ==
- Kasper Drużbicki
- Daniel Pawłowski
- Tomasz Młodzianowski
- Jan Morawski
