= Paulauskas =

Paulauskas is the masculine form of a Lithuanian family name. Of Slavic origin; Polish counterpart: Pawlowski, Russian and Ukrainian: Pavlovsky. Its feminine forms are: Paulauskienė (married woman or widow) and Paulauskaitė (unmarried woman).

The surname may refer to:

- Modestas Paulauskas (born 1945), Lithuanian basketball player
- Artūras Paulauskas (born 1953), Lithuanian Lawyer and politician, the Speaker of Seimas
- Gediminas Paulauskas (born 1982), Lithuanian footballer (Vetra Vilnius)
