= Daniel Pawłowski =

Polish Jesuit theological writer

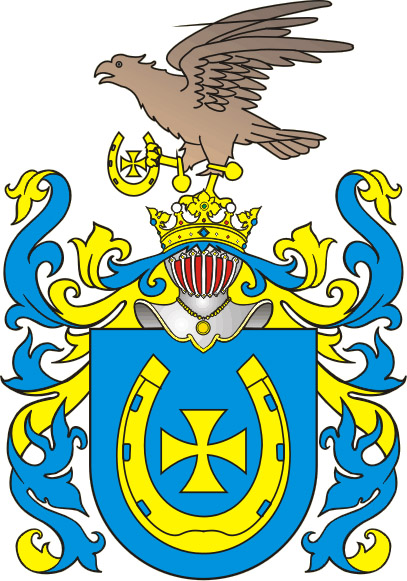
Jastrzębiec – coat of arms of Pawłowski family

Daniel Pawłowski (coat of arms Jastrzębiec) (24 December 1627, in Volhynia – 21 August 1673, in Rawa Mazowiecka) was a Polish Jesuit, theological writer.

Born in a Ruthenian family. He converted to Roman catholicism in the Jesuit college in Ostroh. He entered the Society 10 IX 1642 in Kraków. He received the holy orders in 1654 in Poznań. From 1655 to 1658 he was living in the German province, making the third probation in Oettingen and lecturing on dialectic and logic Eichstätt. After come back to the Polish–Lithuanian Commonwealth professor of the controversy in Kalisz (1658-1659), philosophy and mathematics in Poznań (1659-1660), polemical theology ibidem (1660-1662) and dogmatic theology in Lviv (1662-1663) and Poznań (1663-1668), prefect of the studies in Kalisz (1668-1669), professor of dogmatic theology in Kraków (1669-1672) and instructor of the third probation in Jarosław (1672-1673). Kasper Niesiecki describes him as a mąż świątobliwy (saintly man).

An outstanding representative of the Polish school of spirituality, a pupil of Kasper Drużbicki. Among his works there are:

- Locutio Dei ad cor religiosi (published for the first time: Kalisz 1673, and later about 30 editions in Poland and Europe, also in other languages)
- Mowa boska do serca zakonnika (Poznań 1675, several editions)
- Gottes Ansprach zum Herzen eines Religiosen (Köln 1692, several editions)
- Locucion de Dios al coraçon del religioso (Coimbra 1739)
- Conceptus duo admirabiles. Meridies ante ortum (Poznań 1667, later many more editions)
- Fundamentum vitae aeternae (Prague 1711)
- Vita ex morte seu collectiones de morte (Prague)
- Sacrificium amoris (Kraków 1712)
- Oratio de sancto Thoma Aquinate (1664)
- Coronatum nomen. Panegyricus Stephano Wierzbowski episcopo posnaniensi (Poznań 1665)
- Vita patris Gasparis Druzbicki Poloni Societatis Jesu (Kraków 1670, several editions)
- Wierna życia wielebnego księdza Kaspra Drużbickiego e Societate Jesu relacja (Zamość 1700)

== See also ==
- Mikołaj Łęczycki
- Kasper Drużbicki
- Tomasz Młodzianowski
- Jan Morawski

== Bibliography ==
- Encyklopedia wiedzy o jezuitach na ziemiach Polski i Litwy. 1564-1995, ed. Ludwik Grzebień, Kraków 1996.
- Stanisław Estreicher, Bibliografia polska, v. 24, Kraków 1912.
- Kasper Niesiecki, Herbarz polski, v. VII, Leipzig 1841.
