= Andrius Rudamina =

Lithuanian Jesuit missionary

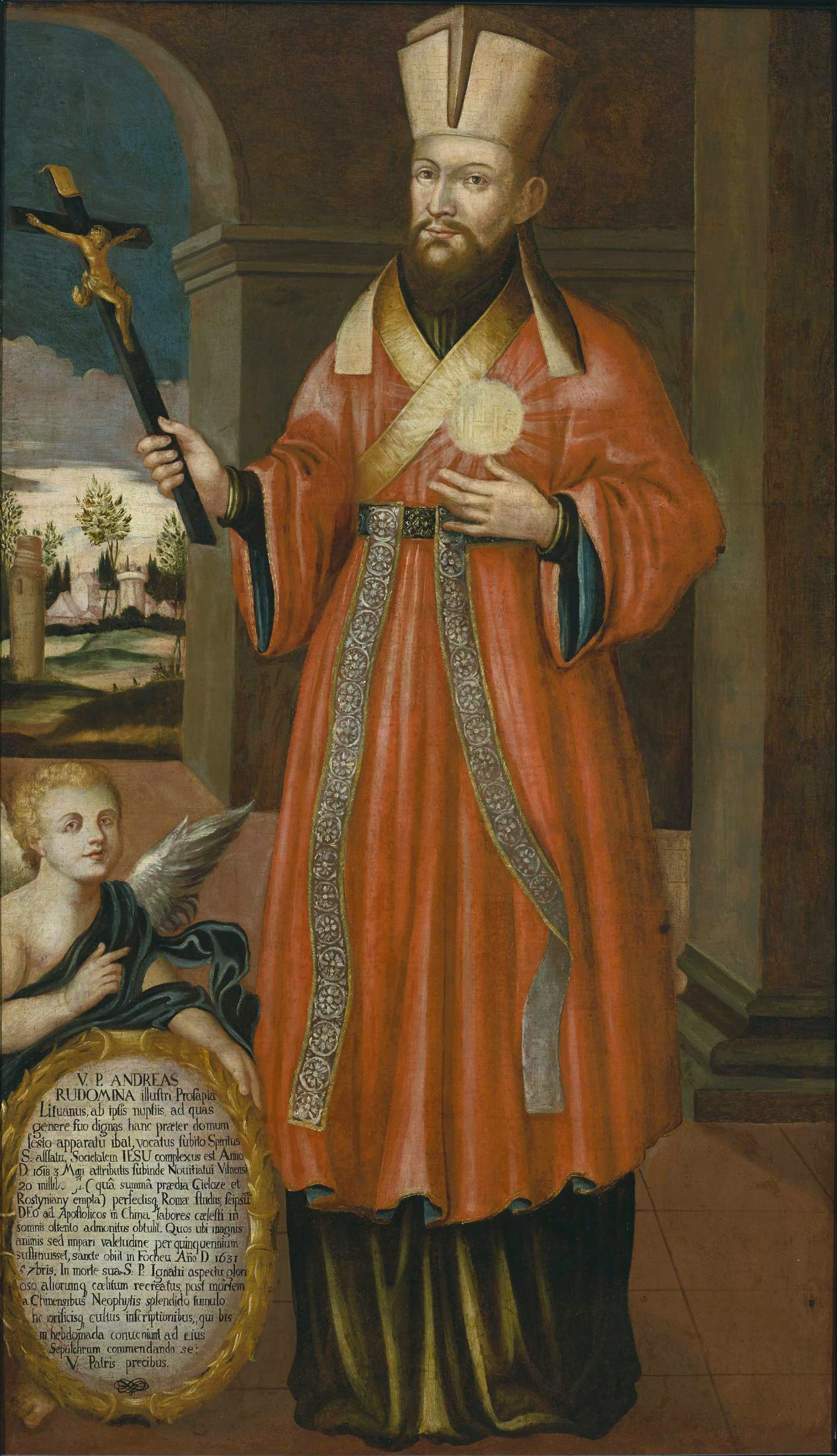
- Rudamina in a painting from 1700–1750
- Born: 1596; Rudamina, Grand Duchy of Lithuania, Polish–Lithuanian Commonwealth
- Died: 5 September 1631 (aged 34–35); Fuzhou, Fujian, Ming China
- Education: Vilnius Jesuit University; University of Leuven; Roman College
- Parent(s): Andrius Rudamina; Dorota Galvelanka
- Religion: Roman Catholic

Andrius Rudamina
- Traditional Chinese: 盧安德
- Simplified Chinese: 卢安德
Transcriptions
Standard Mandarin
- Hanyu Pinyin: Lu Ande

Andrius Rudamina or Lu Ngan tö Pan Sze, S.J. (Latin: Andreas Rudamina; Polish: Andrzej Rudomina; 1596 – 5 September 1631) was the first Lithuanian Jesuit missionary in China and India.

== Early life ==
Andrius Rudamina was born into an old and distinguished Lithuanian noble family in the village of Rudamina, which is 10 kilometres (6.2 mi) away from the country's capital, Vilnius. His father, Jan (or Andrzej) Rudamina, was the mayor of Vilnius and his mother was Dorota Galwelanka. His mother died when Rudamina was still very young and he was the only son in the family. Therefore, already from an early age, his father groomed Rudamina to follow his footsteps and become a statesman.

Rudamina completed his elementary education at home and continued his studies at the Vilnius Jesuit College in 1613. While at college, he excelled at the study of logic and because of his diligence was later invited to join the Sodality of Our Lady. Eventually, he decided to join the Jesuits, but his father, who wanted Rudamina to become a statesman, was strictly opposed to this idea. In an effort to change his son's mind, in 1616, he sent him to study philosophy at the University of Mainz. After his studies in Mainz, in 1617, Rudamina joined the University of Leuven, where according to the wishes of his father, he studied civil law. In parallel to his law studies, he also demonstrated keen interest in mathematics, physics, astronomy and geography.

Rudamina abruptly ended his studies at Leuven and returned to Lithuania once he found out that his father was gravely ill. While back in Lithuania, he began working at the court of one of his relatives Eustachy Wołłowicz, the bishop of Vilnius. Shortly after his return, his father died and Rudamina inherited the family's estates. Then, despite the considerable opposition of his relatives, on 31 May 1618, he finally joined the Jesuit order. Subsequently, he handed over the family estate to the Jesuit novitiate in Vilnius.

Probably at that time, he translated into Polish the book Thesaurus Aphorismorum Politicorum by Jean de Chokier de Surlet. The translation was published only in 1652 under the title O odmianie państw i zgubie panujących i o słusznym ratunku (lit. 'On the Change of States and the Ruin of Rulers and the Just Remedy').

== Life as a Jesuit ==
After a two-year novitiate at the Church of St. Ignatius in Vilnius, on 1 June 1620, he took his first religious vows. He was then sent to study theology at the Jesuit University in Vilnius. At that time, he befriended Andrew Bobola, who came to be known as the Apostle of Lithuania and became a saint, as well as Maciej Kazimierz Sarbiewski, a renowned Jesuit poet. Rudamina and Sarbiewski remained close friends for many years to come, and just before Rudamina's journey to India, Sarbiewski wrote a poem in honour of Rudamina, titled Ad Andream Rudaminum. Between 1620 and 1622, Rudamina studied theology at the Vilnius Academy. In 1622, Rudamina, together with a small number of other young and talented Jesuits from Vilnius, were sent to Rome to continue with their theological studies at the Roman College. On 3 June 1623, Rudamina was ordained as a priest. In 1624, he graduated from the Roman College. After receiving the consent of the Superior General of the Society of Jesus, Mutio Vitelleschi, to go on a mission to China on 5 September 1624, he left Rome for Lisbon.

After the missionary preparations in Lisbon, at the beginning of March 1625, along with eleven Portuguese Jesuits, he sailed to Goa, which he reached on 22 August 1625. At the very beginning of his stay in India, however, Rudamina suffered from malaria and his superiors sent him to Macao where the climate was better for his fragile health. Rudamina spent less than a year in Goa, but he was the first Lithuanian ever to visit India.

== Mission to China ==
Upon his arrival to China, Rudamina studied Chinese language, literature and customs. From Macao he went to Hangzhou in the Zhejiang Province. From Hangzhou he sent books and letters in Chinese to Michael Ortiz, the Provincial of Vilnius. Although Rudamina recovered from the malaria, he became infected with a pulmonary disease during the trip. Yet despite his health problems, he was committed to learning Chinese. He confessed and preached in the language.

The superiors concerned about his deteriorating health sent him at the end of 1628 to the Fujian Province, where several hundred Christians lived, in order to help Father Giulio Aleni. Working together, he and Aleni published an important book in Chinese titled Kouduo Richao 口鐸日抄 (A Diary of Oral Admonitions). This was a book of scholarly dialogues between Jesuit missionaries and Confucian converts in Fujian. Li Jiubiao, the chief editor of the book, highly praised the two Jesuits for their scholarly work. This book was first published in 1630, then in 1872 and again in 1922. During his stay in China, Rudamina also wrote two manuscripts in Chinese, Shih-pa fu hsin t’u 十八幅 心圖 (Eighteen Illustrations of Heart) and Shih fu ch’in tai t’u 十幅 勤怠圖 (Ten Pictures of Industrious and Lazy Men).

Due to his weak health, Rudamina could not participate in long journeys. Therefore, he usually did local pastoral work by explaining the teachings of the Catholic faith, visiting and comforting the sick, receiving guests, as well as preaching and hearing confessions. He was particularly devoted to the sacrament of reconciliation as a confessor. His pastoral work giving the spiritual exercises was effectively adapted to the Confucian notion of self-cultivation. His catechetical method making use of pictures of the Cor Jesu (Heart of Jesus) was also an effective tool in evangelization. This traditional method was already known to be powerful in Europe. He also knew that these pictures could take advantage of the meaning of "heart" in Chinese, xin 心, which referred not only to an anatomical organ, but also had the Confucian philosophical meaning of "mind-and-heart".

As his health got increasingly worse, Rudamina died in Fuzhou on 5 September 1631. His body was buried in the missionary cemetery in a separate tomb in the shape of a chapel. This tomb soon became a place of pilgrimage. His missionary work in China and his last days were described by Benedict de Matos, the Jesuit Provincial Superior of the Fuzhou Province of China, in the text Vita et mors P. Andree Rudomina ex litteris p. Benedicti de Matos socii eiusdem in missione sinensi.

== Bibliography ==
- Grzebień, Ludwik (1989–1991). "Andrzej Rudomina". Polski Słownik Biograficzny. Vol. 32. p. 666.
