= Hieronim Wołłowicz =

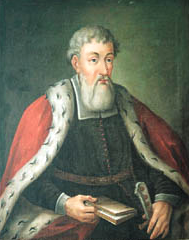
Hieronim Wołłowicz

Hieronim Wołłowicz of Bogorya Coat of Arms, born in the 16th century, died in the 17th century, was Podkanclerz and Grand Treasurer of Lithuania of the Polish–Lithuanian Commonwealth. Starost of Samogitia from 1618 to 1641.

In the early 17th century, Wołłowicz helped to fund the founding of the parish pw. NMP Pocieszenia.

Brother of Andrzej Wołłowicz (d.1614), Eustachy Wołłowicz (bishop of Vilnius) and Paweł Wołłowicz, starosta grodzieński. Hieronim married Elżbieta Gosławska before 1608. They had one daughter: Tekla Anna Wołłowicz.
