= Wojciech Bystrzonowski =

Polish priest and educator

Wojciech Bystrzonowski (1699–1782) was a Polish Jesuit priest, philosopher, and educator. He was born in Małopolska in 1699. During his academic career, he authored works on mathematics and liberty. His most popular work, Polak sensat w liście (1730), was a school text that offered open-ended questions related to contemporary issues of liberty, such as the veto. Bystrzonowski praised Polish democracy but also argued that too much liberty could give way to "wanton license." Bystrzonowski was also rector of the Jesuit College in Poznań.

== Works ==
- (1730) Polak, sensat w liście, w komplemencie polityk, humanista w dyskursie, w mowach statysta, na przykład dany szkolnej młodzi
- (1743) Informacja matematyczna rozumie ciekawego Polaka świat cały, niebo i ziemię i co na nich jest w trudnych kwestiach i praktyce jemuż ułatwiająca
