= Jan Morawski =

Polish Jesuit theological writer (1632–1700)

Portrait with Latin inscription: Two chandeliers shining before the Lord – of the [buried] in the tomb fathers of the Society of Jesus in Poznań. Venerable father Kasper Drużbicki, incorrupted by the death; venerable father Jan Morawski, in the lifetime entirely integral

Dąbrowa coat of arms of Morawski family

Jan Morawski (born 29 December 1633 – 24 June 1700 in Poznań) was a Jesuit, theological writer.

== Life ==
He was of yeomanry (drobna szlachta) descent. His parents were perhaps Marcin and Katarzyna Godlewska. Jan entered the order on 9 November 1651 and after many years of studies (among others in Rome, from 1655 to 1659) was ordained priest. Then he has been lecturing in the Kalisz college (ethics and mathematics 1660–1661, philosophy 1661–1664) and, for many years, in Poznań academy (positive, polemical and moral theology). In 1678 he became the rector in Jarosław and in 1680 the prefect of studies and a professor of moral theology, again in Poznań. In 1682 he became the prefect in Kraków, and next year, the rector and the master of novitiate there. In 1687 he was the deputy of the province for the XIIIth General Congregation in Rome. Next year the father general Thyrsus González de Santalla asked him of a report on the state of the province. This time Morawski was also engaged in ecumenical debates with the orthodoxes. In 1689 he became the rector in Poznań, and in 1696 the prefect and confessor there.

== Works ==
He is the author of numerous (about 30) theological writings, both in Latin in Polish. The most important are:

- Palaestra christianae pietatis (A Sport Field of the Christian Piety, Poznań 1669)
- Duchowna theologia abo Kościół Ducha Świętego, to jest człowiek doskonały (The Spiritual Theology or the Church of the Holy Spirit, i.e. the Perfect Human, Poznań 1695)
- Scintillae divini amoris (Sparks of the Divine Love, Kraków 1684)
- Sancta Romana Ecclesia (The Holy Roman Church, Poznań 1690)
- Quaestiones de Verbo Incarnato et de ejusdem admirabili Matre Virgine (Questions about the Incarnate Word and about Its Admirable Mother Virgin, Poznań 1671)
- Quaestiones de Deo uno et trino (Questions about One and Triple God, Poznań 1674)
- Quaestiones theologicae selectae ad totam Summam divi Thomae Aquinatis (Selected Theological Questions to the Whole Summa of Divine Thomas Aquinas, Kalisz 1681)
- Totius philosophiae principia (The Principles of the Whole Philosophy, Poznań 1666)
- many popular prayer and meditation books

There were usually several (even 20) editions of each work. Kasper Niesiecki summarizes him in following words: A great boast and honor of the philosophical and theological sciences; in which he was so excellent that he used to pull after himself opinions of others.

== See also ==
- Mikołaj Łęczycki
- Kasper Drużbicki
- Daniel Pawłowski
- Tomasz Młodzianowski

== Bibliography ==
- Karol Estreicher, Bibliografia polska, v. 22, Kraków 1908, pp. 551–557.
- Ludwik Grzebień (ed.), Encyklopedia wiedzy o jezuitach na ziemiach Polski i Litwy. 1564–1995, Kraków 1996.
- Antoni Gąsiorowski, Jerzy Topolski (eds.), Wielkopolski Słownik Biograficzny, Warsaw–Poznań 1981, p. 495, ISBN 83-01-02722-3.
