= Church of Saint Nicholas, Kaunas =

Roman Catholic church in Lithuania

Church of Saint Nicholas (of Benedictine Sisters) Kauno Šv. Mikalojaus (Benediktinių) bažnyčia
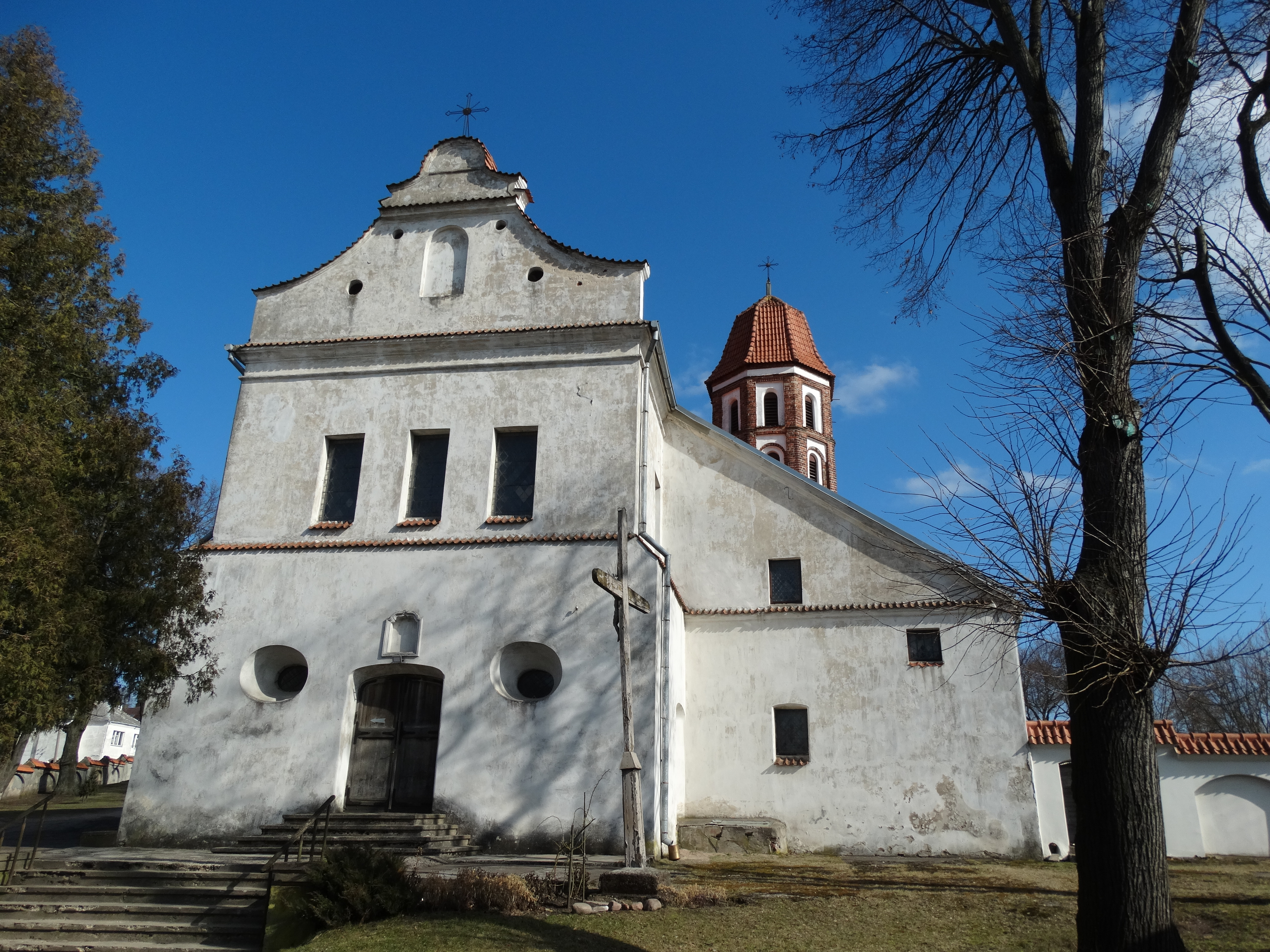
- Church of Saint Nicholas main façade

Religion
- Affiliation: Roman Catholic
- Diocese: Old Town
- Leadership: Roman Catholic Archdiocese of Kaunas

Location
- Location: Kaunas, Lithuania
- Interactive map of Church of Saint Nicholas (of Benedictine Sisters); Kauno Šv. Mikalojaus (Benediktinių) bažnyčia
- Coordinates: 54°53′57″N 23°53′37″E

Architecture
- Type: Church
- Style: Gothic
- Completed: Late 15th century

Specifications
- Dome: 1
- Materials: Masonry (brick)

Website
- kaunobenediktines.wordpress.com

Church of Saint Nicholas (of Benedictine Sisters) (Lithuanian: Kauno Šv. Mikalojaus (Benediktinių) bažnyčia) is a Roman Catholic church in the Old Town of Kaunas, Lithuania.

It is part of the Convent of the Benedictine Sisters in Kaunas.

== Gallery ==
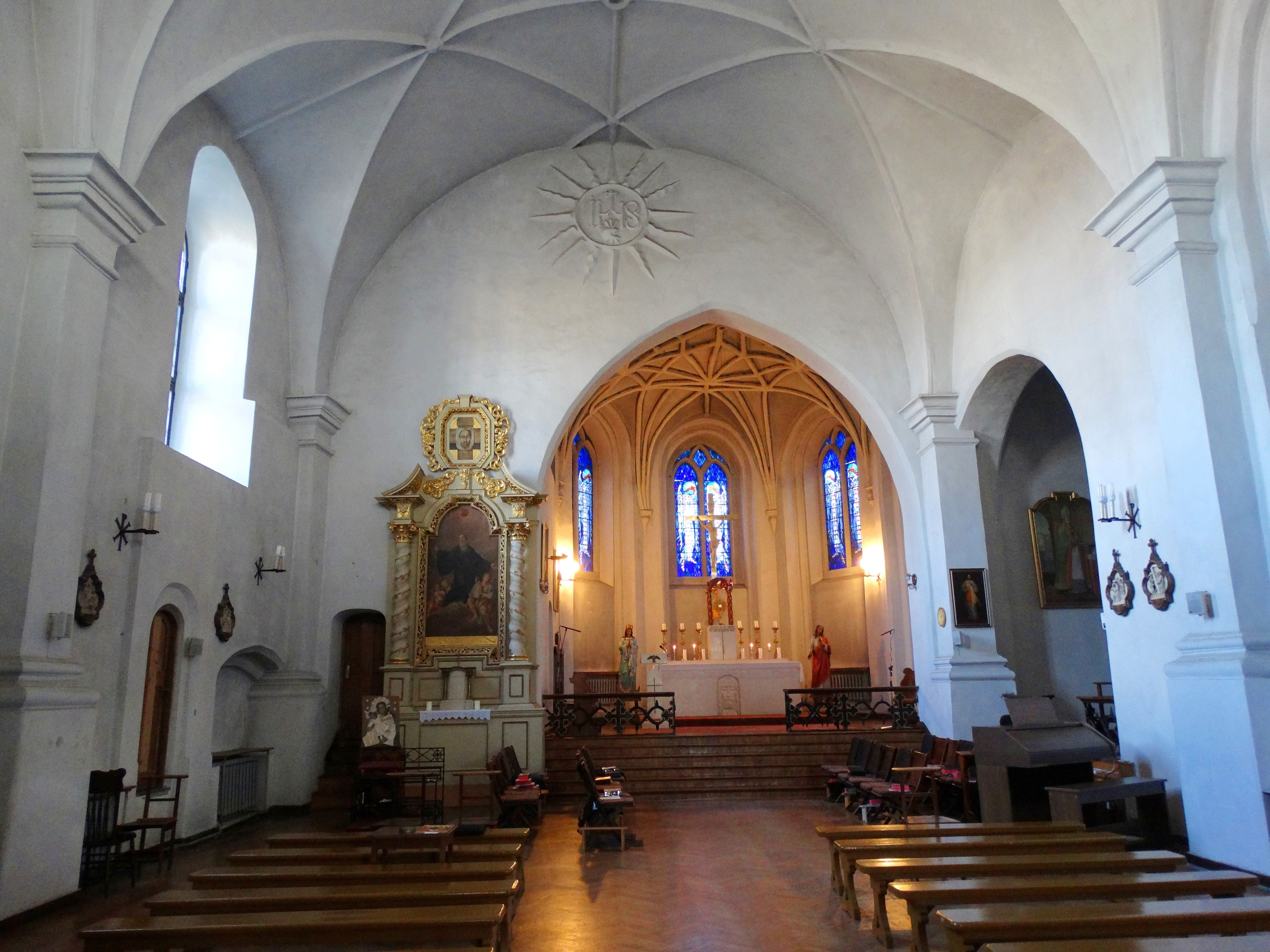
Church interior

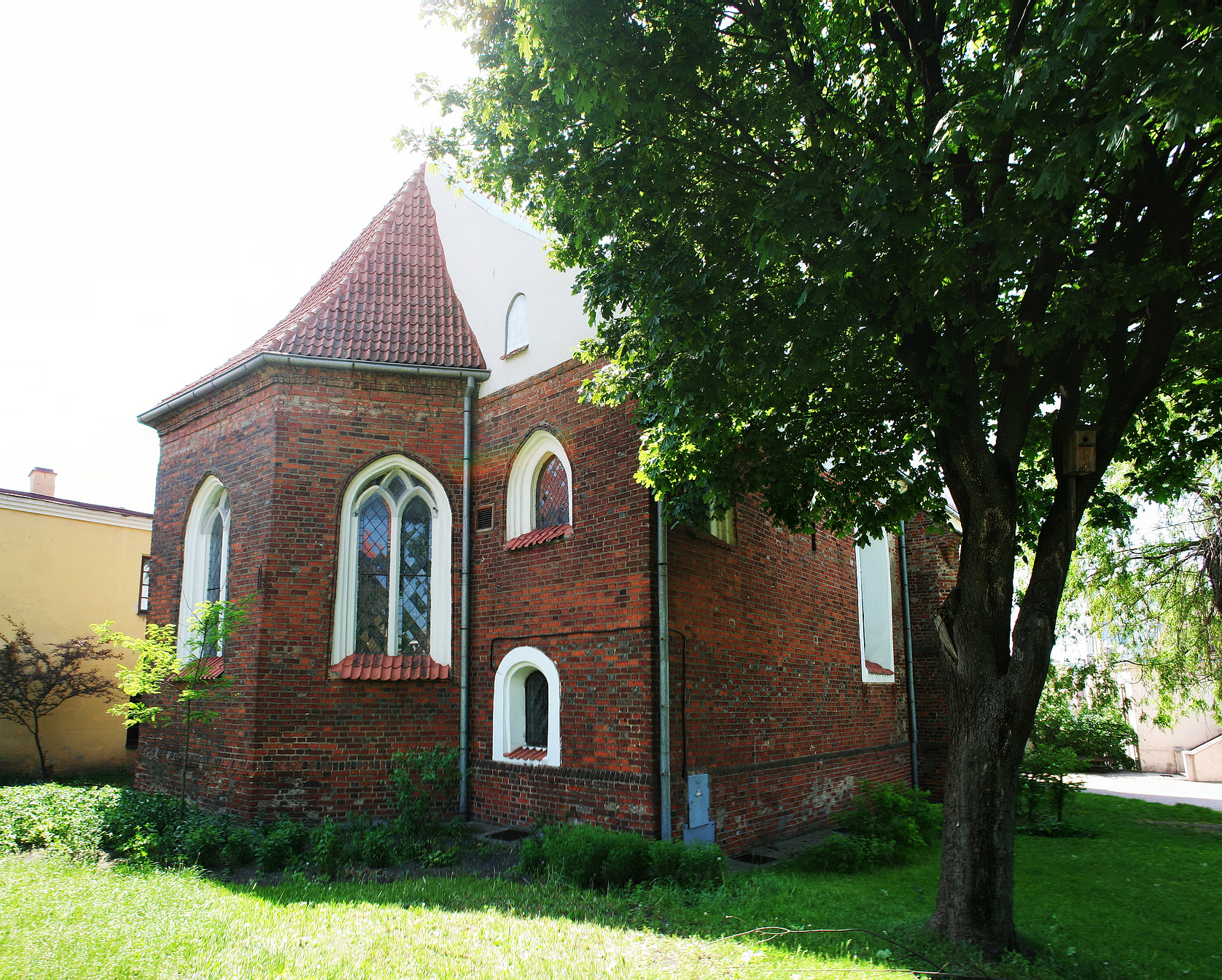
Apse

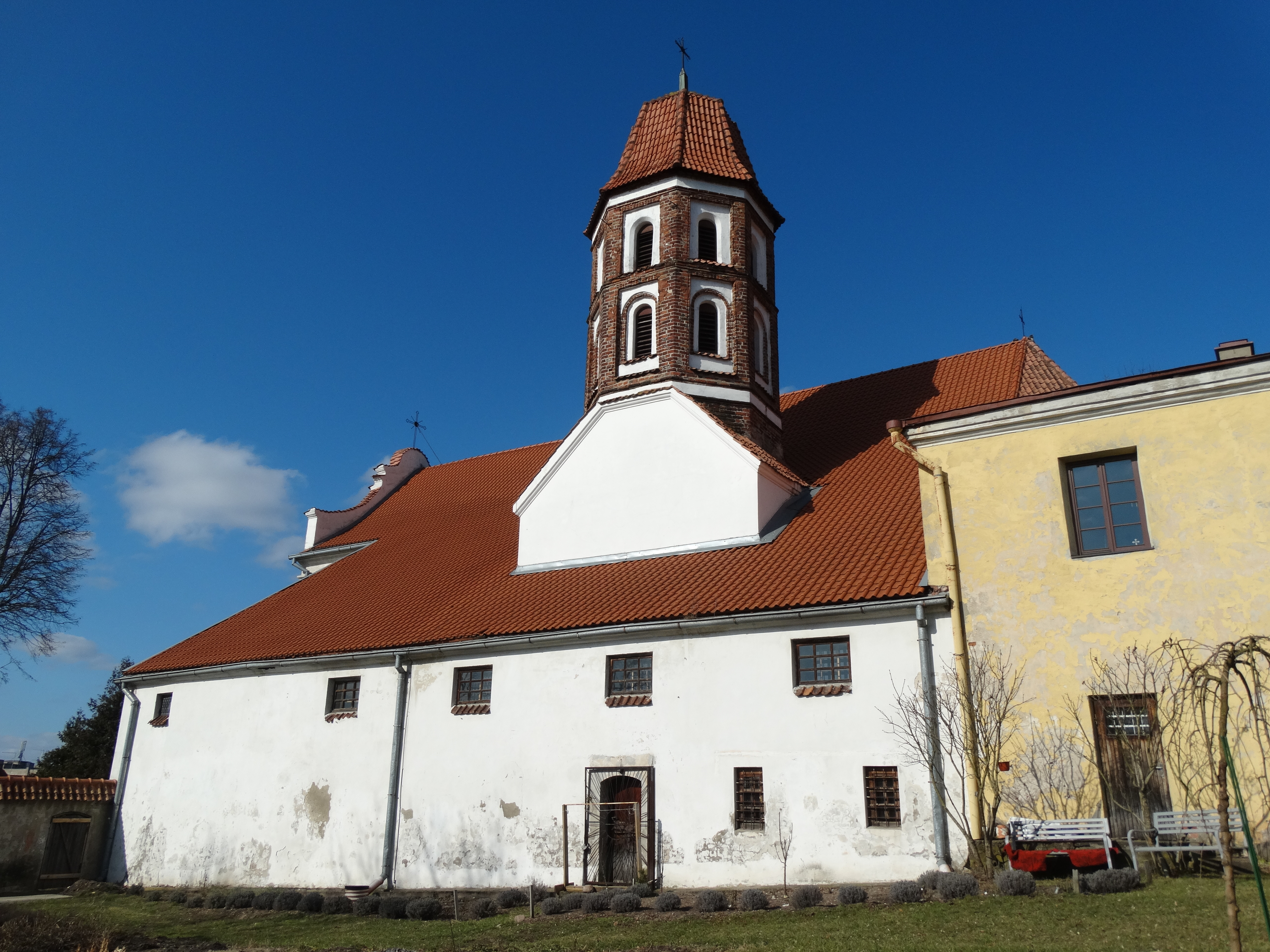
View from the monastery side

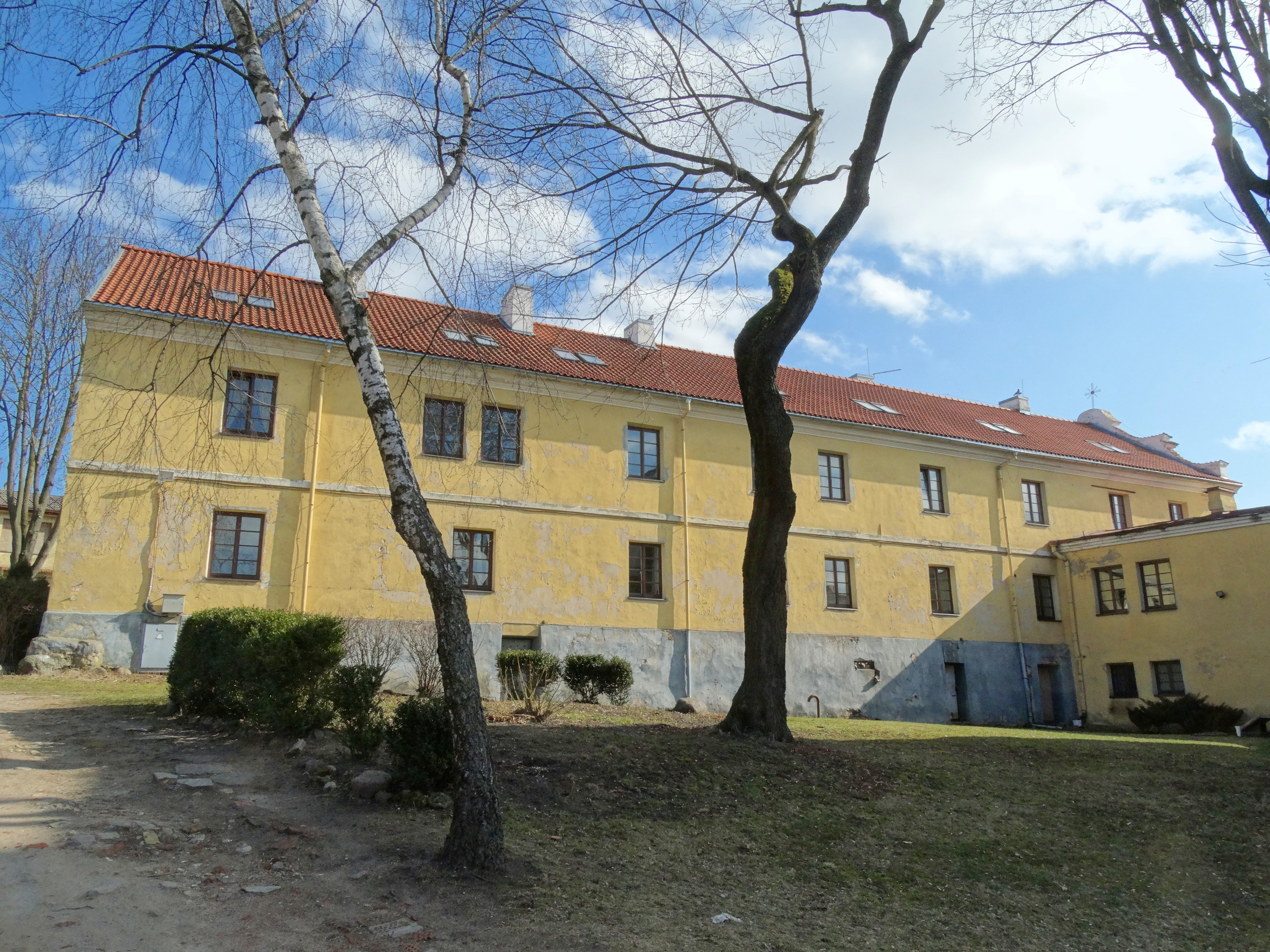
Monastery

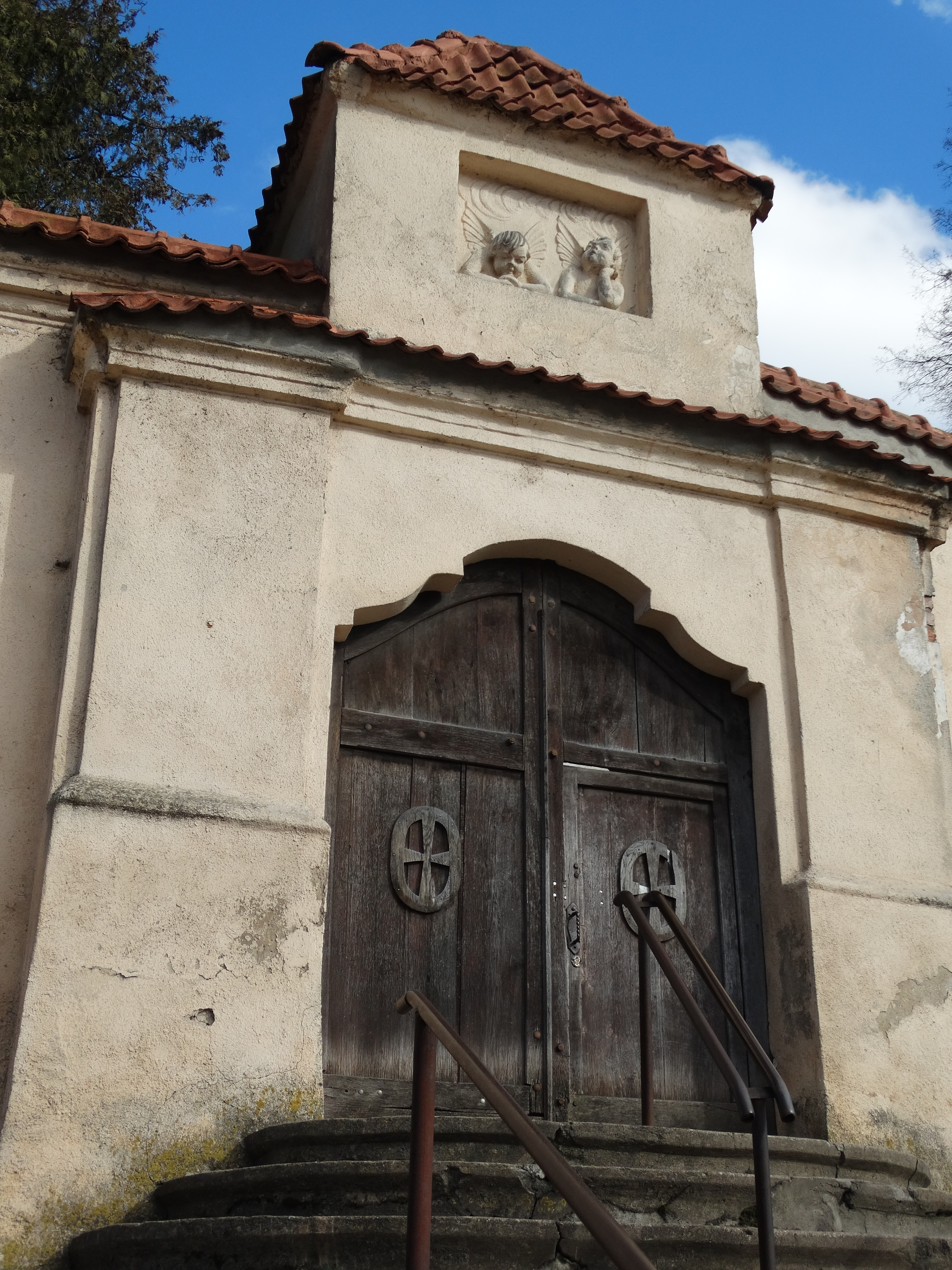
Gates
