= Kasper Drużbicki =

Polish Jesuit and ascetic writer

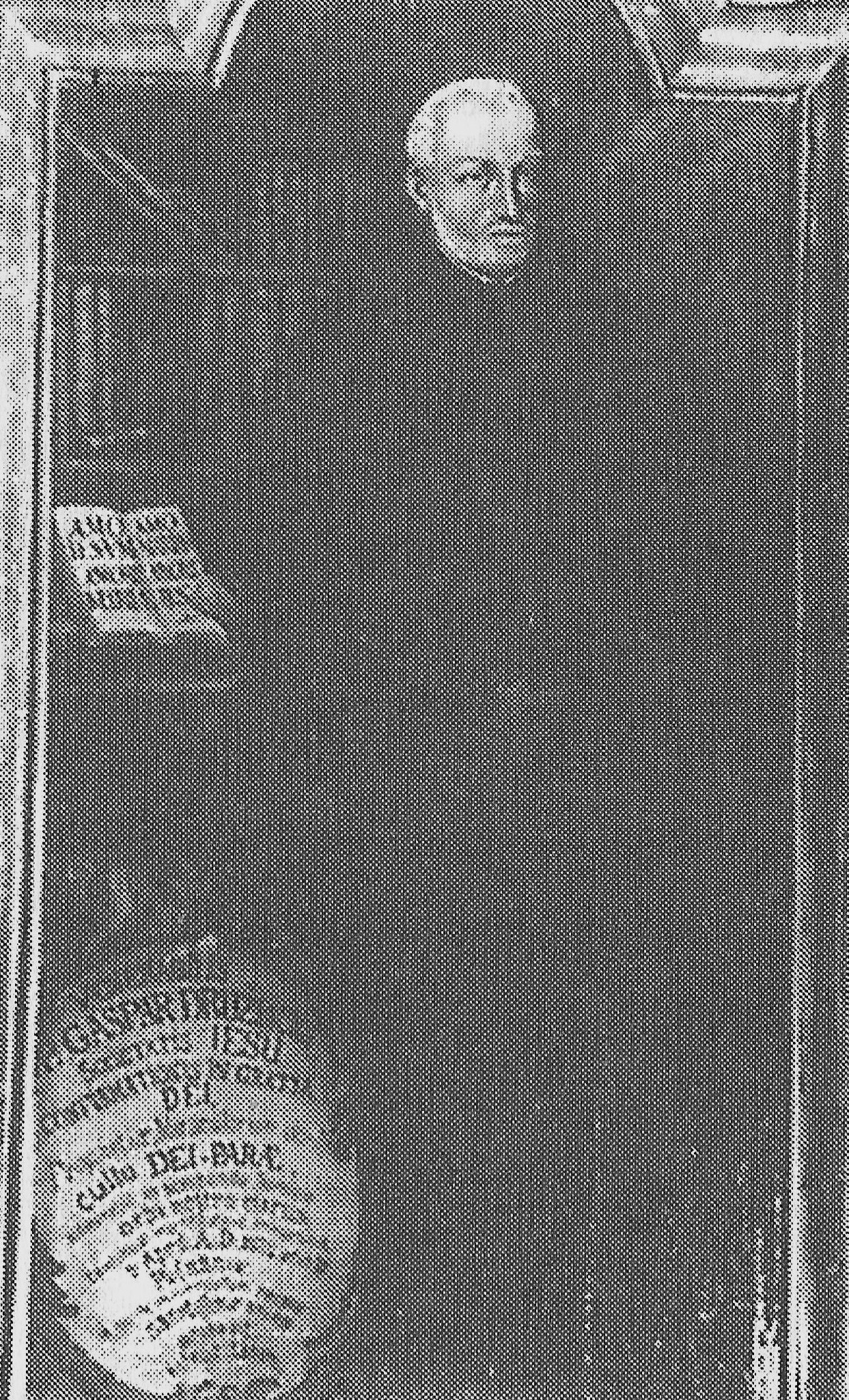
Portrait in the old parish church (fara) in Poznań, with the Latin motto: I love Jesus with the love of Mary – I love Mary with the love of Jesus

Portrait with Latin inscription: Two chandeliers shining before the Lord – of the [buried] in the tomb fathers of the Society of Jesus in Poznań. Venerable father Kasper Drużbicki, incorrupted by the death; venerable father Jan Morawski, in the lifetime entirely integral

Kasper Drużbicki or Gaspar Druzbicius (born probably in Drużbice in Ziemia Sieradzka in Poland, 1589; entered the Society of Jesus, 20 August 1609; died at Poznań, 2 April 1662) was a Polish Jesuit and ascetic writer.

== Life ==
A nobleman (Nałęcz coat-of-arms). After few years of teaching in Lublin, he became master of novices in Kraków, and subsequently rector of colleges of Kalisz, Ostroh, and, for the longest time, Poznań. He also established a new college in Jarosław. He was twice provincial, once deputy provincial and twice procurator. He was in the seventh and tenth general congregations of the order. He was one of the greatest moral authorities in the Polish–Lithuanian Commonwealth, regarded commonly as a saint, prophet and worker of miracles. Drużbicki is said to have received from the Holy Spirit a rare spiritual gift of the confirmation in grace. He was a master of the contemplativus in actione Jesuit ideal.

== Works ==
He was one of the main theologians and mystics of his times, the founder of the Polish school of spirituality (along with Mikołaj Łęczycki), and the worldwide precursor of the devotion to the Sacred Heart. He wrote in advance of the apparitions of Margaret Mary Alacoque. He has written very many ascetic books, published in all over the Europe (and even in the Americas). Most of his works are posthumous and have been drawn from his Opera ascetica (Kalisz-Poznań, 1686-1691), in two volumes in folio, expanded in Opera omnia ascetica (Ingolstadt, 1732). Among them are a brief defense of the Society against a writer in the Kraków Academy (1632); two hagiographic books: Vita et mors gloriose suscepta reverendi patris Alberti Mencinski (Kraków, 1661), in Polish: Szkarłatna róża Boskiego raju (Kraków, 1672), and Verus Jesu socius, edited within Jan Bieżanowski's Vita reverendi patris Petri Skarga (Kraków, 1661).

His most important works are:

- Meta cordium Cor Jesu (first edition: Kalisz, 1683), in Polish: Serce Jezusowe, meta albo cel serc stworzonych (Poznań, 1696), translated for the English "Messenger" as The Sacred Heart, the Goal of Hearts (Angers, 1885), probably by Father Dignam (1890);
- Negotiatio spiritualis (Kraków, 1674), in Polish: Przemysły zysku duchownego (Kraków, 1671);
- Centum modi meditandi Passionem Domini, (Lublin, 1652), also known as Jesus passus;
- Tribunal conscientiae (Kraków, 1672), also known as Industriae examinis, translated in Latin as The Tribunal of Conscience for the "Quarterly Series" edited by the English Jesuits (London, 1885);
- Provisiones senectutis (Kalisz, 1673), in Polish: Przygotowanie do świątobliwej śmierci (Kraków, 1669);
- Dyscypliny duszne (Kalisz, 1685);
- Tractatus de brevissima ad perfectionem via (Kalisz, 1682);
- Diurnus sacerdotum Cibus (Poznań, 1691);
- Liturgicae observationes (Oliwa, 1692);
- Considerationes in dominicas totius anni (Kalisz, 1679);
- Meditationes in festa totius anni (Kalisz, 1680);
- Droga doskonałości chrześcijańskiej (Kalisz 1665);
- Novellus religiosus (Prague, 1690), translated into German as Neuer Religioss (Konstanz, 1710), also into Spanish and found in the Library of Guadalajara, Mexico;
- Vota religiosa (Poznań, 1690);
- Considerationes de soliditate verae virtutis in religioso Societatis Jesu requisita (Prague, 1696), also known as Lapis Lydius boni spiritus (München 1699), translated into French by the Redemptorist Father Ratti (Paris, 1886) and into German by the Benedictine Gütrabber as Prob Stein Eines Wahres Geistes oder Denckwürdige Erwögungen (Tegernsee, 1740).

He was also a proponent of a new devotion - the slavery of Mary. From his inspiration two books on that topic were released: Franciscus S. Phoenicius (Franciszek Stanisław Fenicki), Mariae mancipium (Lublin, 1632), and Jan Chomentowski (Chomętowski), Pętko Panny Maryi (Lublin, 1632).

A complete list of Druzbicki's works occupies twelve columns in Sommervogel.

== Burial ==
Drużbicki is buried in the famous Baroque Fara (old Parish) church in Poznań, where is also his portrait with a sentence: "Amo Jesum amore Mariae; amo Mariam amore Jesu" ("I love Jesus with the love of Mary; I love Mary with the love of Jesus"). Several years after the death his body was exhumed and although it had decomposed, the tongue was still incorrupted.

The life of Drużbicki was recorded in a book by his outstanding disciple Daniel Pawłowski, Vita patris Gasparis Druzbicki Poloni Societatis Jesu (Kraków, 1670).

== See also ==
- Mikołaj Łęczycki
- Daniel Pawłowski
- Tomasz Młodzianowski
- Jan Morawski
- Sacred Heart
- Marguerite Marie Alacoque
- Claude de la Colombière
- Jean Eudes
- Louis de Montfort
- Totus Tuus

== Sources ==
- Augustin de Backer, Bibliothèque de la Compagnie de Jésus, I, 1659–64, III, 2149;
- Carlos Sommervogel, Bibliothèque de la Compagnie de Jésus, III. 212
