= Mateusz Bembus =

Polish priest and writer

Mateusz Bembus (1567–1645) was a Polish Jesuit priest, writer, and professor of moral philosophy. He was born in Poznan in 1567 and became a priest by 1596, after which he taught philosophy. In 1612, he succeeded Piotr Skarga as the royal preacher for King Sigismund III Vasa. After this role, he became rector of the Jesuit College in Poznan. During his career, he advocated against religious tolerance in the otherwise tolerant Polish–Lithuanian Commonwealth. Antonio Possevino and Skarga were influences for Bembus. He died in Krakow.

== Works ==
=== Pamphlets ===
- Pax Non Pax (Peace No Peace)
- Bellator christianus (Christian Warrior)
- Krotka sprawa o nowym kolegium ojcow Societatis lesu (A Brief Information on the New Jesuit College)

=== Sermons ===
- Wizerunek szlachcica prawdziwego
