= John Nicholls (controversialist) =

Welsh religious controversialist

- Born: 1555; Cowbridge
- Died: 1584?
- Occupation: Religious controversialist

John Nicholls (1555–1584?) was a Welsh religious controversialist.

== Biography ==
Nicholls was the son of John Nicholls. He was born at Cowbridge, Glamorganshire. After having attended various ‘common schools,’ he entered, at sixteen, White Hall (now Jesus College), Oxford. A year later he removed to Brasenose, but left the university without a degree. He returned to Wales, and, after acting as tutor in a family for a year and a half, became curate of Withycombe, Somerset, under one Jones, vicar of Taunton. He afterwards officiated at Whitestaunton, Somerset, but in 1577 he left the church, and travelled by London to Antwerp. A week later he visited Dr. William Allen, at that time head of the English seminary at Douay. Nicholls seems to have still professed himself a Protestant, and was banished the town. He then proceeded to Grenoble, where he stayed with the archbishop three months. Subsequently, he served the Bishop of Vicenza, and visited Milan, and was admitted to the English seminary at Rome. He appears to have voluntarily presented himself before the inquisition, 27 April 1578, and was commanded to preach in defence of the Roman church before the pope and four cardinals on 25 May 1578. He entered the seminary on 28 May, having publicly abjured Protestantism and received absolution, which was published by the notary 8 May 1579. He preached a Latin sermon on St. Peter's day, 5 August 1579.

Nicholls remained at the seminary two years, but professed to despise the scholars who, he says, could ‘neither construe Latin nor preach as well as the shoemakers and tailors in England.’ Having obtained from the pope a viaticum of fifty crowns, under pretence of ill-health he left Rome some time in 1580 for Rheims, where Allen was then living. Nicholls, however, proceeded to England, and not long after was arrested at Islington, and committed to the Tower of London by Sir Francis Walsingham and the Bishop of London. During his imprisonment he wrote: ‘John Niccols Pilgrimage, wherein is displayed the lives of the proude Popes, ambitious Cardinals,’ &c., London, 1581; also ‘A Declaration of the Recantation of John Nichols (for the space almost of two yeeres the Pope's Scholar in the English Seminarie or Colledge at Rome), which desireth to be reconciled and received as a member into the true church of Christ in England,’ London, 1581. The recantation was made 5 February, before Sir Owen Hopton, lieutenant of the Tower, citizens, and prisoners, and was printed on 14 February. This book is rare. Two copies were placed in the British Museum—one in the Grenville Library there, and another with valuable manuscript notes. Soon after ‘A Confutation of John Nicolls his Recantation’ came out anonymously, and was answered by Dudley Fenner in ‘An Answere unto the Confutation,’ &c., London, 1583. Nicholls also published ‘The Oration and Sermon made at Rome, &c., by John Nichols, latelie the Pope's Scholar,’ with an address to the queen, and an autobiographical letter to the worshipful Company of Merchant Adventurers at Embden and Antwerp, London, 1581. The same year appeared, anonymously, ‘A Discoverie of J. Niccols, Minister, misreported a Jesuite, latelye recanted in the Tower of London, wherein … is contayned a ful Answere to his Recantation, with a Confutation of his Slaunders.’ The author of this book was Robert Parsons. No copy is in the British Museum, but one was placed in the Bodleian. It was answered by Thomas Lupton in ‘The Christian against the Jesuite, Wherein the secrete or namelesse writer of a pernitious booke intituled A Discouerie, &c. … is … justly reprooued,’ London, 1582.

After his recantation Nicholls was employed to preach to the Catholics in the Tower. Upon Easter Sunday, 19 March 1581, he preached there before a large company of nobles and courtiers invited by Sir Owen Hopton (Records of the Society of Jesus, ii. 164). It was intended to give him ‘the next living that fell in’ (Strype, Grindal, pp. 390–1). In the meantime Archbishop Grindal was prayed by the council, 10 May 1581, to direct the bishops to contribute to the maintenance of their convert; 50l. a year was collected for him. But at the end of 1582 Nicholls again crossed to the Low Countries and Germany, in company with Lawrence Caddey, his former fellow-student at Rome, who had also recanted in England. He was thrown into prison at Rouen, and again turned to Romanism. In letters to Dr. Allen, dated 18 and 19 February 1583, he expressed penitence, and professed that his statements written in the Tower, and accusations brought against Sir George Peckham, Judge Southcot, and others, were extracted from him by Sir Owen Hopton under threats of the rack. On 20 February 1583, Nicholls was examined, and retracted his accusations against the English colleges at Rome and Rheims, to which Dr. Allen had already replied in his ‘Apologie and True Declaration … of the two English Colleges.’ ‘A True Report of the late Apprehension and Imprisonment of John Nicols,’ containing also the ‘Satisfaction’ of three other recusants—Caddey, Richard Baines, and James Bosgrave—was published at Rheims in 1583 by the Catholics. Nicholls's letters to Dr. Allen, and a public confession, are printed at the end of Nicholas Sanders's ‘De Schismate Anglicano,’ lib. iii., Ingolstadt, 1588, pp. 334, 351. Nicholls probably died in 1583 or 1584, Watt (Bibl. Brit.) says ‘in great misery.’ Weak, inconstant, ‘timorous,’ and boastful, Nicholls appears to have wholly lacked convictions. Rishton, in the continuation of Sanders's ‘De Schismate,’ is probably wrong in crediting him with the intention of becoming a mahometan. He says he was ‘never at heart a Romanist,’ and was probably more inclined to Calvinism than to any other form of religious belief.
