= Pawłowo =

Pawłowo (Polish pronunciation: [paˈvwɔvɔ]) may refer to the following places:

== Toponymy ==
=== In Masovian voivodeship ===
- Pawłowo, Ciechanów County (east-central Poland)
- Pawłowo, Mława County (east-central Poland)
- Pawłowo, Płońsk County (east-central Poland)
- Pawłowo, Pułtusk County (east-central Poland)
- Pawłowo, Sierpc County (east-central Poland)

=== In Greater Poland Voivodeship ===
- Pawłowo, Gniezno County (west-central Poland)
- Pawłowo, Rawicz County (west-central Poland)

=== In Pomeranian Voivodeship ===
- Pawłowo, Chojnice County (north Poland)
- Pawłowo, Gdańsk County (north Poland)
- Pawłowo, Kwidzyn County (north Poland)
- Pawłowo, Sztum County (north Poland)

=== In Warmian-Masurian Voivodeship ===
- Pawłowo, Olsztyn County (north Poland)
- Pawłowo, Węgorzewo County (north Poland)
