= Stanisław Załęski =

Polish priest and historian of Jesuit history

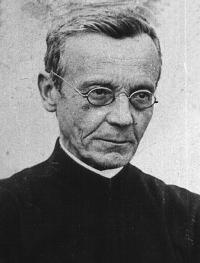
Stanisław Załęski

Stanisław Załęski (1843–1908) was a Polish priest and historian who wrote about the history of the Jesuits in Poland. His series titled Jezuici w Polsce was published in several volumes from 1900 to 1906, and the work covered Jesuit history beginning in the 16th century. Some of the source material that Załęski used for Jezuici w Polsce was later permanently lost during World War II. Załęski also wrote Historia zniesienia jezuitów w Polsce i jego zachowanie na Białej Rusi which covered Jesuit history in the Russian Empire. This work was translated into French and Italian in the 1880s. The Polish Academy of Arts and Sciences described Załęski's work as "for both the clergy and for the educated classes".

== Works ==
- Historia zniesienia jezuitów w Polsce i jego zachowanie na Białej Rusi
- Jezuici w Polsce
