= James Bosgrave =

English Jesuit

- Born: 1547? Godmanston, Dorsetshire
- Died: 1620s Poland
- Occupation: Jesuit

James Bosgrave (1547?–1620s) was an English Jesuit.

== Biography ==
Bosgrave was born at Godmanston, Dorsetshire, 'of a very worshipful house and parentage,' about 1547. He was probably a brother of Thomas Bosgrave, who suffered along with Father John Cornelius at Dorchester on 4 July 1594. He left England in his childhood; entered the novitiate of the Society of Jesus at Rome on 17 November 1564; and was ordained priest at Olmütz in Moravia in 1572. For twelve years he taught Greek, Hebrew, and mathematics at Olmütz, whence he was sent to Poland and eventually to Vilna in Lithuania. His health declining he was ordered by his superiors to return to England to try his native air. He was seized on landing at Dover in September 1580, was taken before the privy council, and was subsequently committed to the Marshalsea prison and cruelly tortured there. Afterwards he was removed to the Tower of London and was affain put to the torture. Some time after his arrest Bosgrave consented to attend the services of the established church, and was thereupon set at liberty. His fellow Catholics naturally held aloof from him as an apostate. He then addressed to the privy council a protest in which be declared that he had been deceived through his own ignorance and their fraud, and he likewise printed another protest for the Catholics. He was at once re-arrested. On 14 November 1581 be was arraigned in the king's bench, with Father Edmund Campion and others, and on the 20th of that month he received sentence of death, but at the request of Stephen Báthory, king of Poland, Queen Elizabeth consented to spare his life. He was reprieved and remanded back to the Tower. It was alleged by the government that he and Henry Orton, a lay gentleman, gave answers different from those made by the other priests to the questions put to them about the deposing power of the holy see. The government published these replies in 'A Particular Declaration or Testimony of the undutiful and traitorous affection borne against her Majestie by Edmund Campian, Jesuite, and other condemned priests,' 1582. It has been supposed that the answers of Bosgrave and Orton are not correctly given (Foley, Records, iii. 292, 772), but there can be no doubt that Bosgrave wished to be neutral between two extreme parties.

At length Queen Elizabeth was prevailed upon to restore him to liberty, and on 21 January 1684-5 he was sent into exile with Father Jasper Haywood and others, twenty-one in all. He returned to Poland and died at Calizzi on 27 October 1621, or, as another account sets forth, in 1628, 'septuagenario major.'

He is the author of 'The Satisfaction of M. James Bosgrave, the godly confessor of Christ, concerning his going to the Church of the Protestants at his first coming into England.' It is printed with 'A True Report of the late Apprehension and Imprisonment of John Nicols, Minister at Roan,' Rheims, 1583.
