= Šilai, Panevėžys =

Town in Panevėžys District Municipality, Lithuania

Šilai
- Town
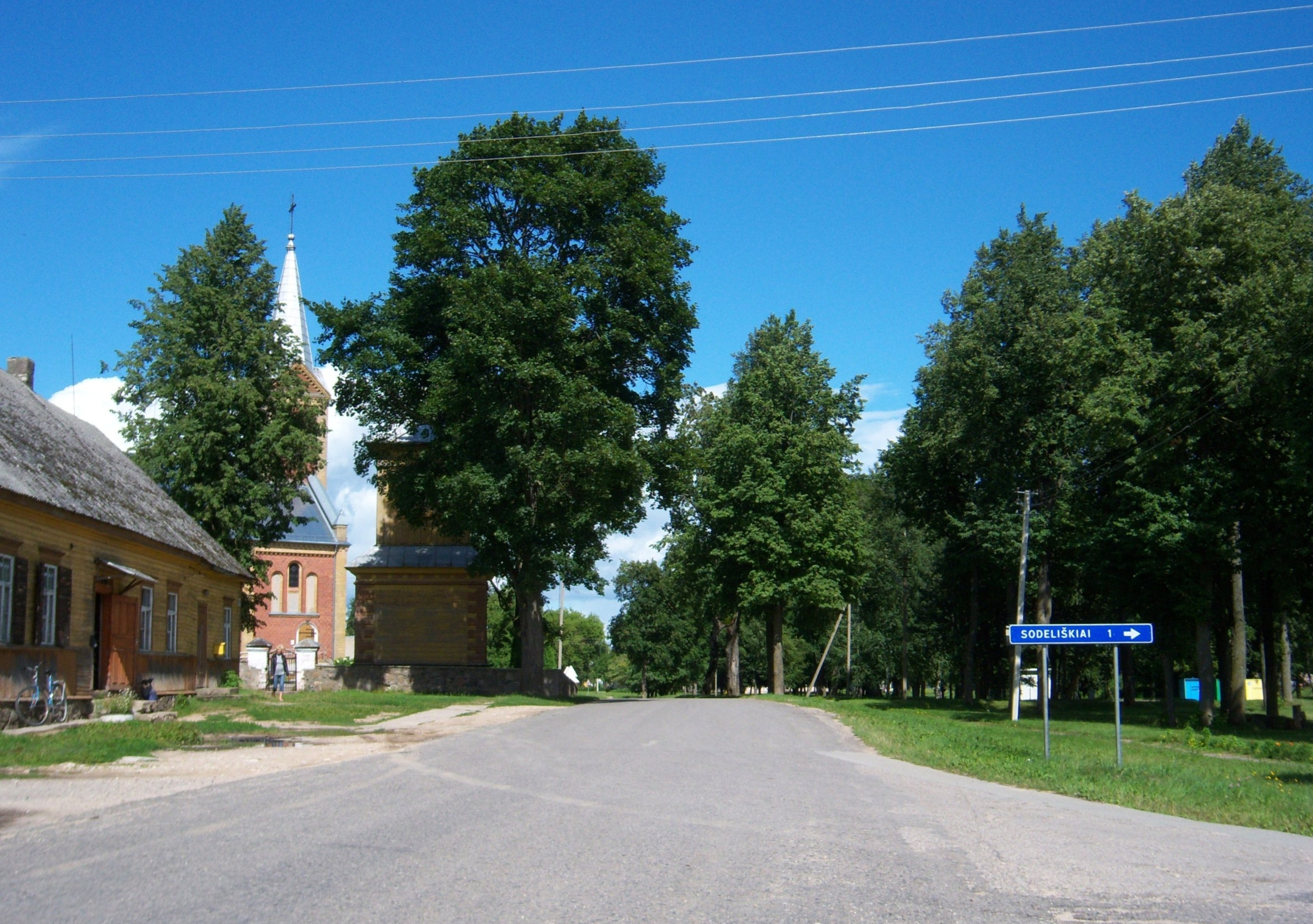

- Location within Lithuania
- Coordinates: 55°44′10″N 24°46′50″E
- Country: Lithuania
- County: Panevėžys County
- Municipality: Panevėžys District Municipality
- Eldership: Raguva

Population (2011)
  - Total: 252
- Time zone: UTC+2 (EET)
  - Summer (DST): UTC+3 (EEST)

Šilai is a town in Panevėžys District Municipality, Lithuania. According to the 2011 census, it had population of 252.
