= Rudamina (Vilnius) =

- Town
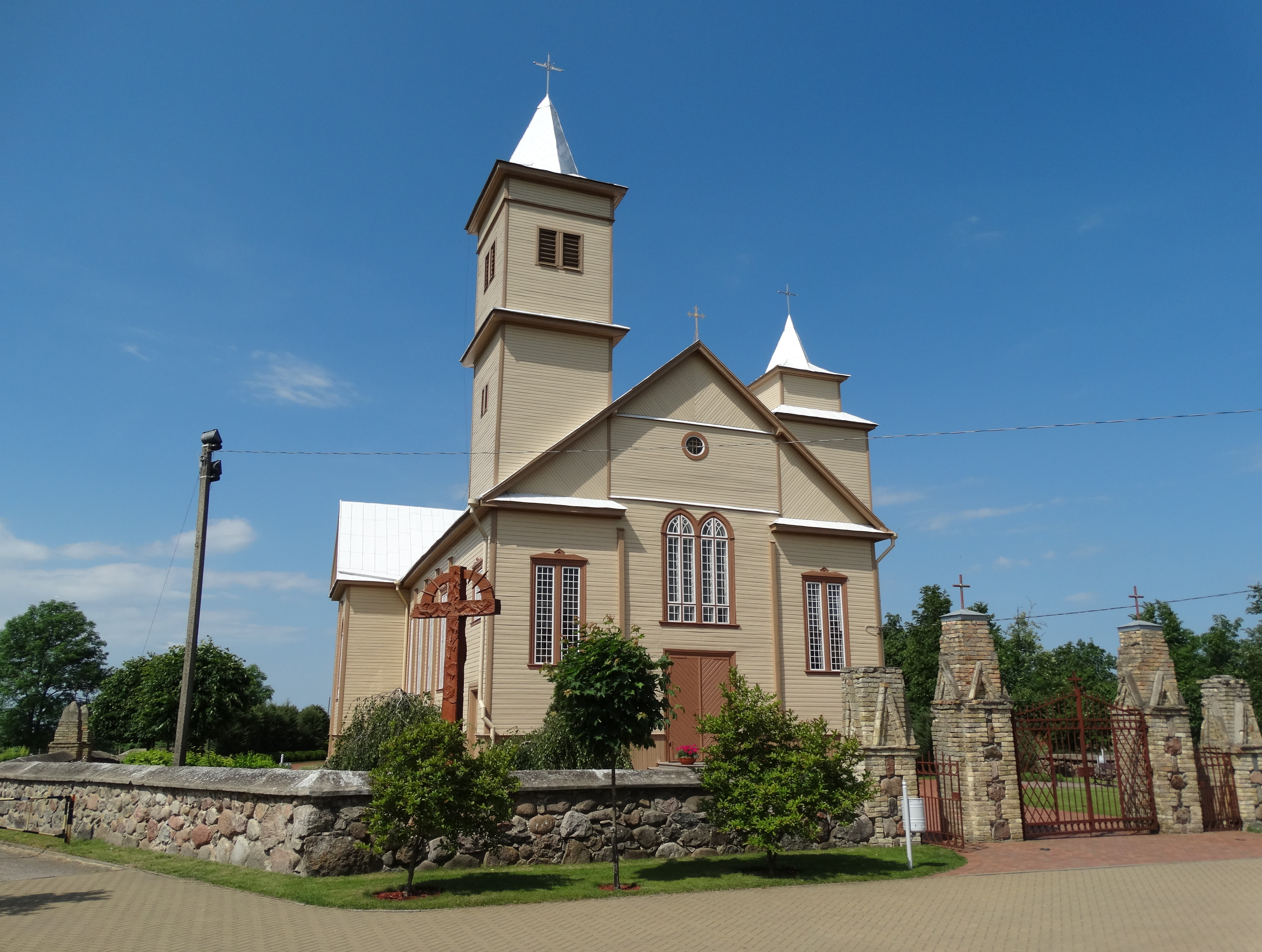
- Catholic church in Rudamina

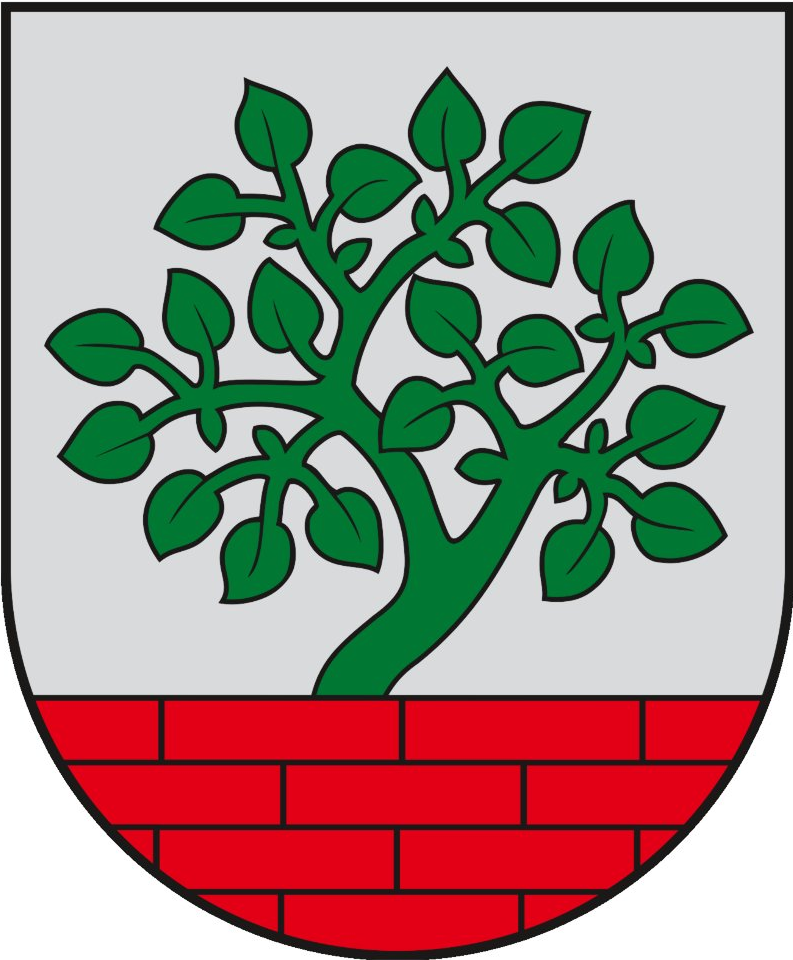
- Coat of arms

- Location of Rudamina in Lithuania
- Coordinates: 54°35′49″N 25°21′00″E
- Country: Lithuania
- County: Vilnius County
- Municipality: Vilnius district municipality
- Eldership: Rudamina eldership
- Elevation: 170 m (560 ft)

Population (2021)
  - Total: 3,713
- Time zone: UTC+2 (EET)
  - Summer (DST): UTC+3 (EEST)

Rudamina is a town in Vilnius district municipality, Vilnius County, east Lithuania, it is located only about 1 kilometre (0.62 mi) south-east of Vilnius city municipality. As of the 2001 census, the town had a population of 3937 people. The village has a Catholic church.

Rudamina was the location of one of many Roman Catholic churches where the priests had to know the Lithuanian language according to the Grand Duke of Lithuania Alexander Jagiellon in 1501

In 2010 the smaller village of Čekėnai was united with Rudamina, the combined town having a population of approximately 4300.

The town has 2 gymnasiums, Rudamina school of arts, 2 kindergartens, Vilnius district central library, post office (ZIP code: 13031).
