= Barbora Žagarietė =

Lithuanian martyr and Servant of God

Servant of God Barbora Žagarietė
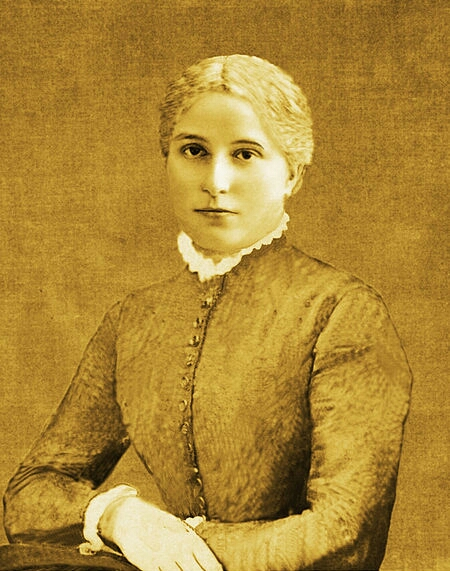
- Portrait of Barbora Umiastauskaitė
- Born: Barbora Umiastauskaitė; 1628; Žagarė, Grand Duchy of Lithuania
- Died: 1648 (aged 20); Žagarė, Grand Duchy of Lithuania

Barbora of Žagarė (1628 – c. 1648) was a Roman Catholic laywoman from Žagarė, then Grand Duchy of Lithuania. According to oral history, Barbora distinguished herself by her Christian virtues and died young under obscure circumstances. Her remains were said to be incorruptible. This inspired a strong following among local people, and numerous miracles are attributed to her. In 2005, the Diocese of Šiauliai began the beatification process, calling her a Servant of God.

== Biography ==
There is almost no verifiable information about Barbora's short life, which is shrouded by various hagiographical narratives. She was the only child born into a noble family of Umiastowskis. Her mother died early and she had a strict stepmother. Local people tell stories about her care for the sick and generosity for the beggars. She would intercede on behalf of serfs and walk to the church on her knees. It is said that her exceptional piousness and devotion to God displeased and angered her father. She wanted to become a nun, and even joined a Franciscan monastery in Riga, but her non-believer father would not allow it. Narratives tell that she jumped out of the second floor of the manor to escape her father's wrath, and died of injuries. In a document from 1876, vice-governor Vasily Ryzhkov of Kovno Governorate first recorded the claim that Barbora died escaping her father's lust and thus remained a virgin.

== Remains ==
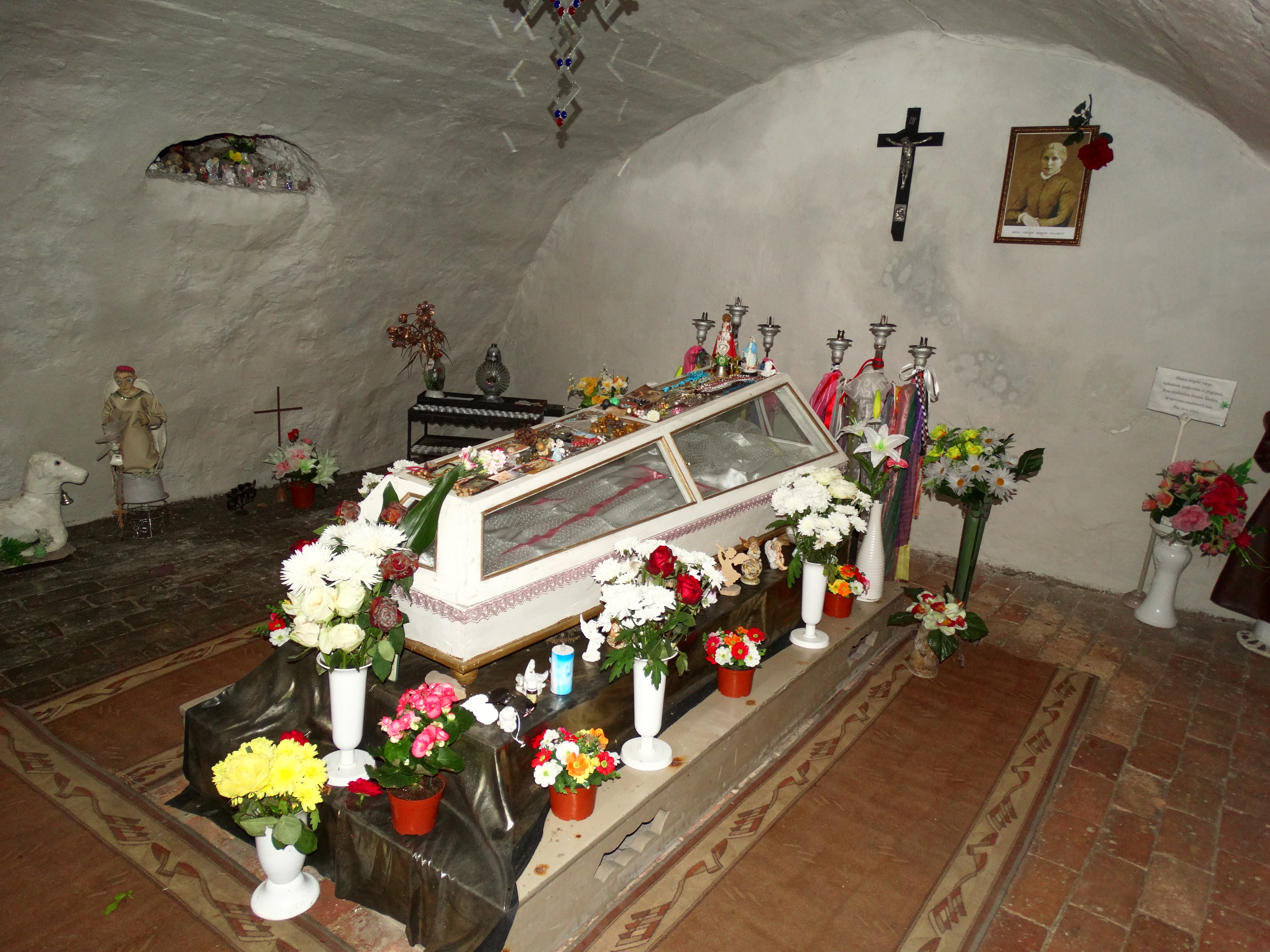
Crypt dedicated to Barbora

Barbora was first buried either in Žvelgaičiai or Umiastowski family crypt. However, due to growing veneration of Barbora, her body was moved to the old church of Žagarė. In 1655, during the Second Northern War, Sweden invaded Lithuania and burned down the church. Barbora's body and hair was blackened, but otherwise untouched by the flames; as a result, her cult grew stronger. Tsarist authorities discouraged Catholicism and the crypt was walled up in 1877 on orders of Pyotr Albedinsky, Governor-General of Vilna; it was reopened in 1896. The remains were put in a glass coffin in the crypt beneath the high altar. In 1906, an entrance was made to the crypt from outside to ease access. In 1963, during an anti-religious campaign in the Soviet Union, authorities of the Lithuanian SSR closed the church and transferred the remains of to an unknown location. At the same time, forensic pathologist and MGB agent Juozas Markulis analyzed the body, but his work did not survive. Reportedly, the Soviets considered displaying the remains at the Museum of Atheism. Efforts to locate the remains were unsuccessful. When the church was returned to the congregation, a symbolic casket was placed in the same crypt.

== Veneration ==
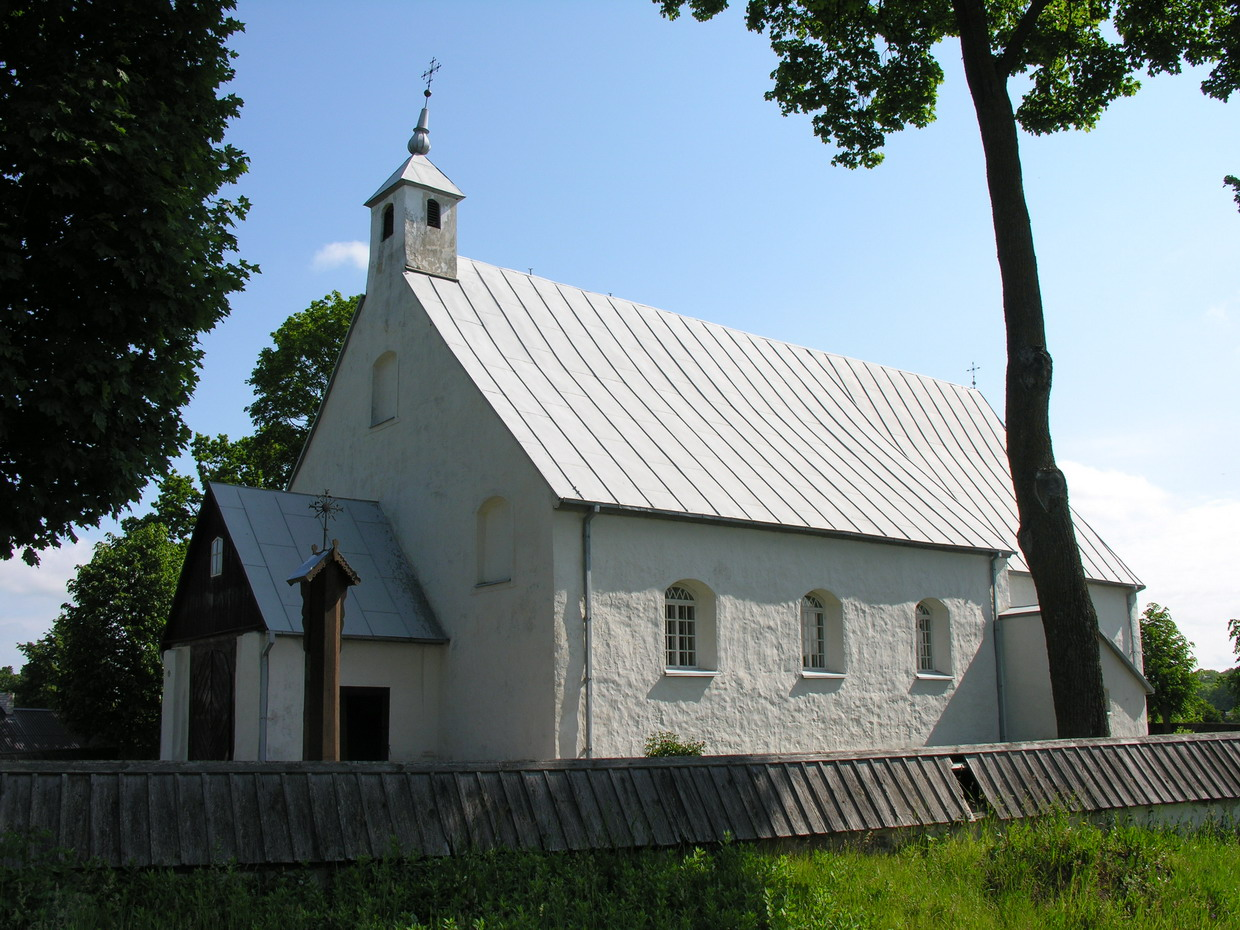
The old church in Žagarė

The virgin of Žagarė was first mentioned by Antoni Dominik Tyszkiewicz, Bishop of Samogitia, in his report to the Holy See in 1755. The report was discovered by historian Jonas Totoraitis in 1938. The bishop reported the story of her unburned corpse and seven other miracles, mostly healing of various ailments, said to have taken place between 1735 and 1748. On 7 January 1860, Motiejus Valančius tasked the parish priest at the Old Žagarė church with registering miracles or other divine graces attributed to Barbora's intercession. By December 1940, 97 miracles had been documented, but none have been canonically investigated. The book listing the miracles was thought to have been destroyed during World War II. However, after the fall of Communism in 1990, Boleslovas Babrauskas, parish priest at St Peter and Paul's church in Žagarė, found it. The miracles mainly related to curing ailments related mostly to legs and eyes.

Local people venerated Barbara as if she were a saint. It was common to circle her coffin three times on knees. Her cult merged with that of Saint Barbara, as the women shared not only name but also similar life stories. Local people celebrated the feast of Barbora Žagarietė on 4 December and sang hymns that were translated from Polish and initially meant for St. Barbara. Other commemorations take place on 29 June, the Feast of Saints Peter and Paul, and 2–9 July, the Great Žemaičių Kalvarija Festival. To express his gratitude to Žagarietė for healing his sister, Alfonsas Lažinskas commissioned an oak wayside shrine by Rimantas Zinkevičius to be installed in the churchyard of the Old Žagarė Church. The shrine was blessed by Eugenijus Bartulis, Bishop of Šiauliai, on 6 August 2006.

The possibility of Barbora's beatification was investigated by Janina z Ostroróg-Sadowskich Umiastowska, philanthropist and widow of Władysław Umiastowski, and Władysław Kwiatkowski, rector of the Polish College in Rome, in 1937–1938. In November 2004, Eugenijus Bartulis sent a request to the Holy See to begin the beatification and canonization for Žagarietė. In May 2005, the Holy See replied that there were no obstacles in initiating the case; it was officially opened by Bartulis on 24 September 2005. In 2006, a group of nine scientists was dispatched on an expedition to find and collect information on Žagarietė.
