= List of Polish marquesal families =

This is a list of Polish noble families with the title of Marquess.

#	Name	Coat of arms	Title recognition	Country	Estates	Remarks
1	Gonzanga-Myszkowski	Jastrzębiec	1603	Papal State, Duchy of Mantua	Duchy of Mirów, Ordynacja Pińczowska	Zygmunt Myszkowski and his brother Aleksander was adopted by Vincenzo Gonzaga, Duke of Mantua in 1597
2	Gonzanga-Myszkowski-Wielopolski	Starykoń			Ordynacja Pińczowska	Inherited the legacy of Ordynacja Pińczowska and the title of marquess in 1729
3	Umiastowski	Roch III		Papal State		personal title for Janina z Ostroróg-Sadowski wife of Władysław Umiastowski

== Bibliography ==
- Szymon Konarski, Armorial de la noblesse titrèe polonaise, Paris 1958
- Tomasz Lenczewski, Genealogie rodów utytułowanych w Polsce, t. I, Warszawa 1997.

== See also ==
- List of szlachta
- List of Polish titled nobility
- Magnates of Poland and Lithuania
