= Bartulis =

Family name

Bartulis or Bārtulis is the masculine form of a Lithuanian and Latvian surname. Its feminine forms in Lithuanian are Bartulienė (married woman or widow) and Bartulytė (unmarried woman), but in Latvian Bārtule. Notable people with the surname include:

- A. C. Bartulis (1927–2011), American politician and businessman
- Eugenijus Bartulis (born 1949), bishop of the Roman Catholic Diocese of Šiauliai
- Vidmantas Bartulis (1954–2020), Lithuanian composer
- Oskars Bārtulis (born 1987), Latvian ice hockey player
