= Šiauliai Cathedral =

Cathedral of Sts. Peter and Paul
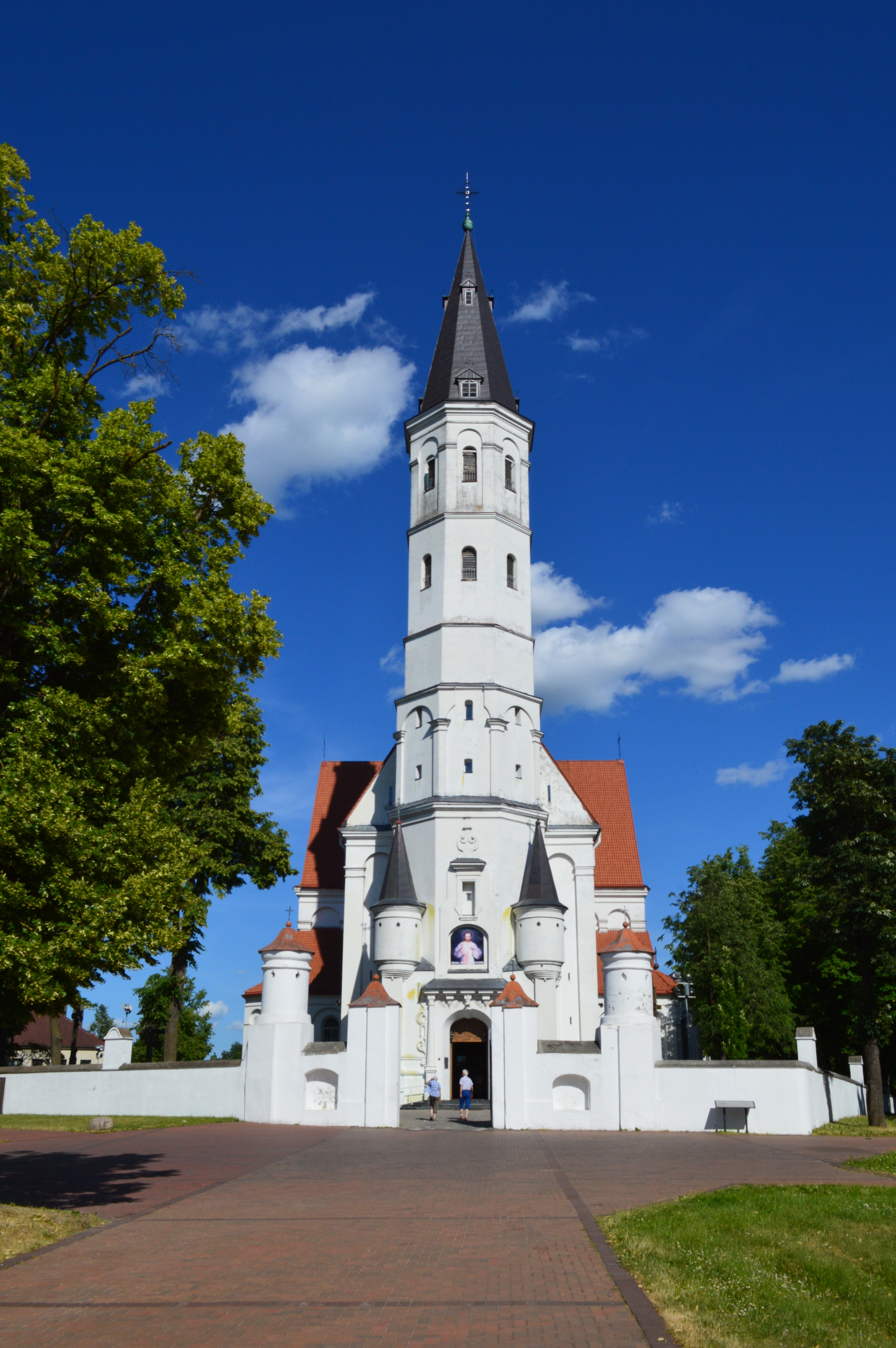
- Šiauliai Cathedral

- Location within Lithuania

Religion
- Affiliation: Roman Catholic
- Ecclesiastical or organizational status: Cathedral
- Leadership: Bishop Eugenijus Bartulis
- Patron: Saint Peter and Saint Paul
- Status: Active

Location
- Location: Šiauliai, Lithuania
- Interactive map of Cathedral of Sts. Peter and Paul
- Coordinates: 55.9328°N 23.32°E

Architecture
- Style: Renaissance
- Groundbreaking: 1585
- Completed: 1626

Specifications
- Direction of façade: West
- Spire: One
- Spire height: 70 m (230 ft)

Website
- http://www.siauliukatedra.lt/

The Sts. Peter and Paul Cathedral (Lithuanian: Šv. Apaštalų Petro ir Pauliaus katedra) also called Šiauliai Cathedral is a religious building of the Catholic Church that serves as the cathedral in Šiauliai, a city in northern Lithuania, and the seat of the Roman Catholic Diocese of Šiauliai.

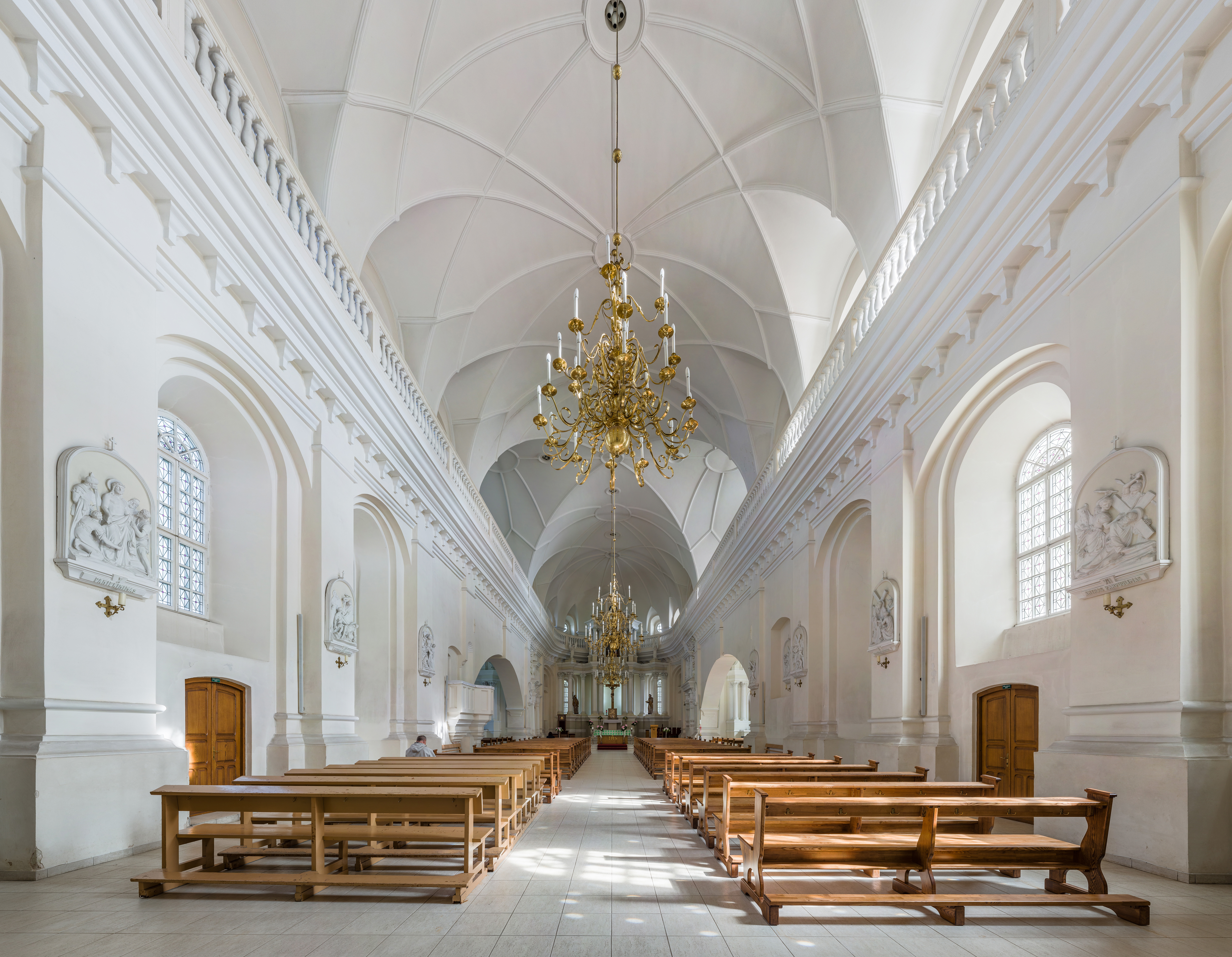
Interior of the cathedral

== History ==
The Church of Saints Peter and Paul was built in the seventeenth century, between 1617 and 1626, and is a significant example of the Renaissance and Mannerism. In 1880, lightning struck a tower, so it was necessary to make repairs. The most significant damage occurred after World War II. In 1944 the church was in a sorry state, but already during the Soviet era, the church was restored.

Simultaneously with the creation of the Diocese of Siauliai on May 28, 1997, the Church of Saints Peter and Paul was elevated to the status of cathedral by Pope John Paul II.

== See also ==
- Roman Catholicism in Lithuania
- Sts. Peter and Paul Cathedral
