= Military Ordinariate of Lithuania =

Roman Catholic diocese in Lithuania

Military Ordinariate of Lithuania Lietuvos kariuomenės ordinariatas

Catholic
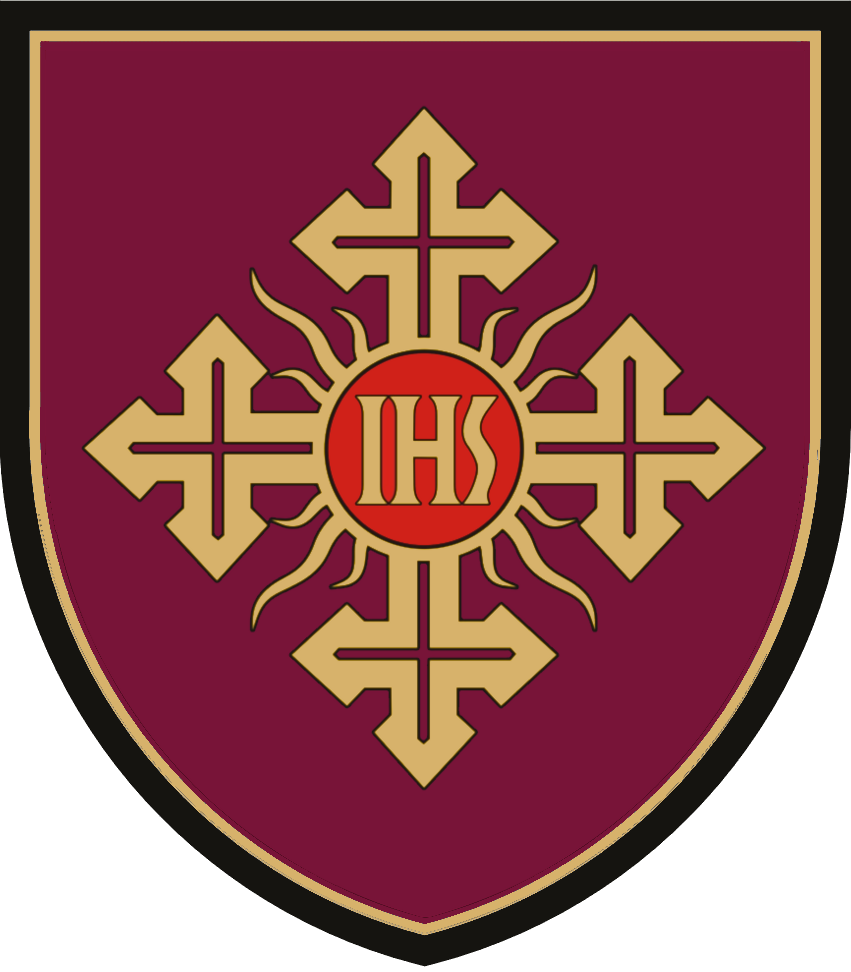

Location
- Country: Lithuania
- Coordinates: 54°40′56″N 25°16′58″E

Information
- Denomination: Roman Catholic
- Sui iuris church: Latin Church
- Rite: Latin Rite
- Established: 25 November 2000 (25 years ago)
- Cathedral: Cathedral of St. Ignatius of Loyola, Vilnius

Current leadership
- Pope: Leo XIV
- Bishop: Vacant
- Apostolic Administrator: Gintaras Grušas

Website
- http://www.ordinariatas.lt

The Military Ordinariate of Lithuania (Lithuanian: Lietuvos kariuomenės ordinariatas) is a military ordinariate of the Roman Catholic Church. Immediately subject to the Holy See, it provides pastoral care to Roman Catholics serving in the Lithuanian Armed Forces and their families. The military ordinaries have the rights and duties of a bishop and participate in the Lithuanian Bishops' Conferences.

== Establishment ==
The relationship between Lithuania and the Holy See was regulated by the Concordat of 1927. The Vatican did not recognize the occupation of Lithuania by the Soviet Union in 1940 and the concordat remained in effect. After Lithuania regained independence in 1990, Lithuania reestablished official diplomatic relations with the Holy See and concluded three agreements on 5 May 2000. One of these agreements concerned pastoral services to members of the Lithuanian Armed Forces and agreed on the establishment of the military ordinariate.

This agreement was modelled after the agreement to establish the Military Ordinariate of Croatia in 1997. According to the agreement, the ordinariate is established by the Holy See and is headed by a military ordinary appointed by the Holy See. The ordinary appoints military chaplains. The Ministry of National Defence provides funding for the ordinariate and the military chaplains.

The agreements were ratified and became effective in September 2000. The military ordinariate of Lithuania was established by the apostolic constitution Christi discipuli issued on 25 November 2000. After a year-long delay, a bilateral commission was formed to issue regulations on the new agreements. The work on the ordinariate's regulations went smoothly perhaps because there were already ample examples among other NATO countries and the regulations were adopted in August 2002.

== Places of worship ==
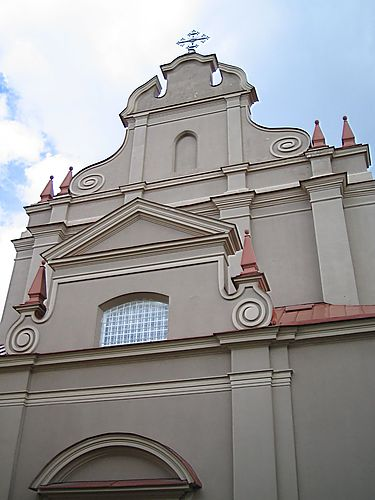
Cathedral of St. Ignatius of Loyola, a cathedral of the Ordinariate in Vilnius

On 23 November 2004 (the day of the Armed Forces of Lithuania), the Church of St. Ignatius of Loyola in Vilnius was dedicated to the military ordinariate (it acts as the seat of the curia and cathedral of the ordinariate). Built in the 17th century, the church was neglected during the Soviet period and underwent extensive renovations in 2001–2004 at a cost of 1.14 million litas paid by the Ministry of Defence. The dedication ceremony was attended by many officials and dignitaries, including President Valdas Adamkus, Minister of Defence Linas Linkevičius, cardinal Audrys Juozas Bačkis, papal nuncio Peter Stephan Zurbriggen, and others.

In addition the church in Vilnius, the ordinariate also has chapels at the General Jonas Žemaitis Military Academy of Lithuania, at the military bases in Rukla and Tauragė. The military also uses the Church of St. Michael the Archangel, Kaunas.

== Activities ==
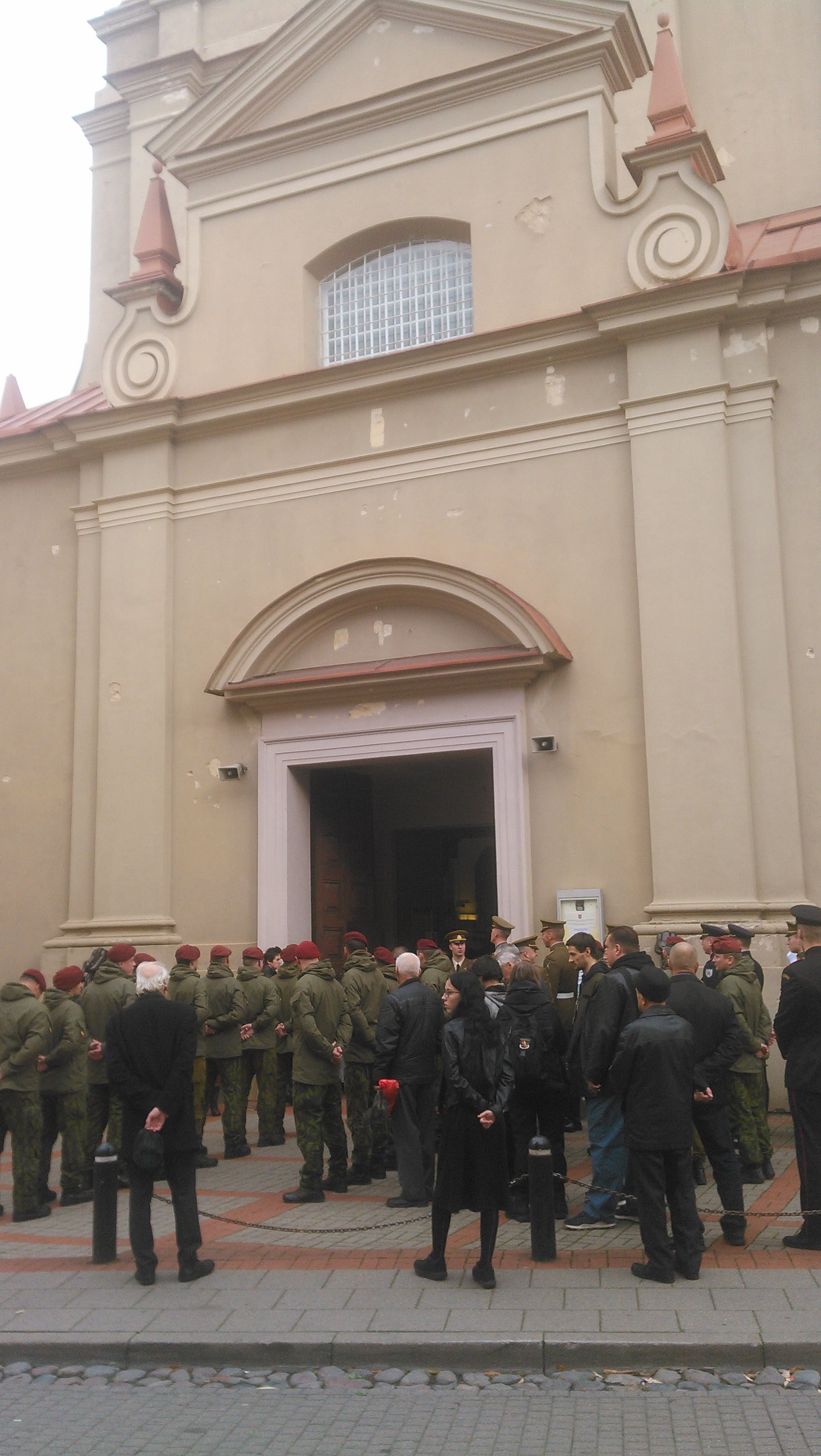
State funeral of Antanas Kraujelis in 2019

Military chaplains are both clergymen and military officers (they have military ranks, usually major or captain). They receive salaries from the ordinariate which is financed by the Ministry of National Defence. The military ordinary earns a salary equal to that of a first-year brigadier general. In 2005, there were 17 military chaplains who served all military units of the Armed Forces of Lithuania as well as two military education institutions. Chaplains also participated in the international military missions, including in Afghanistan.

Roman Catholics are the only religious group to provide chaplains to the military. In September 2014, the Lithuanian Evangelical Reformed Church concluded an agreement with the Ministry of National Defence regarding pastoral services in the military. However, since the ministry would not finance such services, the church lacks financial resource and staff to implement the agreement in practice.

== Personnel ==
=== Military ordinaries ===
- Eugenijus Bartulis (appointed on 25 November 2000 – resigned on 19 June 2010)
- Gintaras Grušas (appointed on 19 June 2010 – named Archbishop of Vilnius on 5 April 2013)

=== Chief military chaplains ===
- Alfonsas Svarinskas (1990–1996)
- Alfonsas Bulotas (1996–2000)
- Juozas Gražulis (2000–2009)
- Saulius Kasmauskas (2009–2010)
- Rimas Venckus (acting 2010–2011, permanent since 2011)
