= Gintaras Grušas =

Lithuanian-American Catholic prelate (born 1961)

His Excellency Gintaras Grušas
- Archbishop of Vilnius
- Archbishop Grušas in 2017
- Church: Roman Catholic Church
- See: Vilnius
- Appointed: 5 April 2013
- Installed: 23 April 2013
- Predecessor: Audrys Bačkis
- Other post: Apostolic Administrator of the Military Ordinariate of Lithuania
- Previous post: Military Ordinary of Lithuania (2010–13)

Orders
- Ordination: 25 June 1994 by Audrys Bačkis
- Consecration: 4 September 2010 by Audrys Bačkis
- Rank: Archbishop

Personal details
- Born: Gintaras Grušas; 23 September 1961 (age 65) Washington, D.C., U.S.
- Education: Pontifical University of Saint Thomas Aquinas
- Motto: Gratia, misericordia et pax (Latin for 'Grace, mercy and peace')
- Coat of arms: Gintaras Grušas's coat of arms

Gintaras Grušas (born 23 September 1961) is a Lithuanian-American Catholic prelate who has served as the President of the Council of the Bishops' Conferences of Europe since 2021 and the Archbishop of Vilnius since 2013. He previously served as Bishop of the Military Ordinariate of Lithuania from 2010 to 2013.

== Biography ==
Grušas was born in Washington, D.C., on 23 September 1961. His parents had reunited only a year earlier after 16 years apart when his mother was able to leave the Soviet Union and join his father in the United States. The family relocated to California and raised their son in Agoura. He earned a BS degree in Mathematics and Information Science at the University of California, Los Angeles (UCLA). He spent five years working as a technical consultant in marketing for IBM, which, he said, helped prepare him for the management and project-planning skills that a pastor needs.

Grušas began his preparation for the priesthood at the Franciscan University of Steubenville in Steubenville, Ohio. He then earned a Bachelor of Sacred Theology degree at the Pontifical University of Saint Thomas Aquinas (Angelicum) in 1994. He was ordained a priest on 25 June 1994.

After his ordination he worked as secretary-general of the Lithuanian Bishops' Conference until 1997. He earned a Licentiate of Canon Law in 1999 and a Doctorate of Canon Law in 2001 from the Angelicum. From 2001 to 2003 he was rector of the seminary in Vilnius.

On 2 July 2010, Pope Benedict XVI named him Military Ordinary of Lithuania and he was consecrated a bishop on 4 September.

On 5 April 2013, Pope Francis appointed him Archbishop of Vilnius to succeed Cardinal Audrys Juozas Bačkis. He was installed there on 23 April 2013. Appearing publicly Grušas on his chest wear a cross made from amber (which is nicknamed Baltic region's gold) and his name Gintaras translates from Lithuanian to English as amber.

On 9 June 2014 he was named a member of the Vatican's Congregation for the Clergy and on 13 July 2016 of the Secretariat for Communications.

He was elected president of the Lithuanian Bishops' Conference on 28 October 2014. On 26 September 2021, he was elected President of the Council of the Bishops' Conferences of Europe.

On 23 October 2024, the Synod of Bishops elected Grušas a member of the Ordinary Council of the General Secretariat of the Synod.

Catholic Church titles
Preceded by Eugenijus Bartulis	Military Ordinary of Lithuania; 2010–2013	Succeeded by Vacant
Preceded by Audrys Juozas Bačkis	Archbishop of Vilnius; 2013–present	Succeeded by Incumbent
