= Natività di Nostro Signore Gesù Cristo a Via Gallia =

Natività di Nostro Signore Gesú Cristo a Via Gallia
- Nativity of Our Lord Jesus Christ in via Gallia (in English)
- Nativitatis Domini Nostri Iesu Cristi in via Gallia (in Latin)
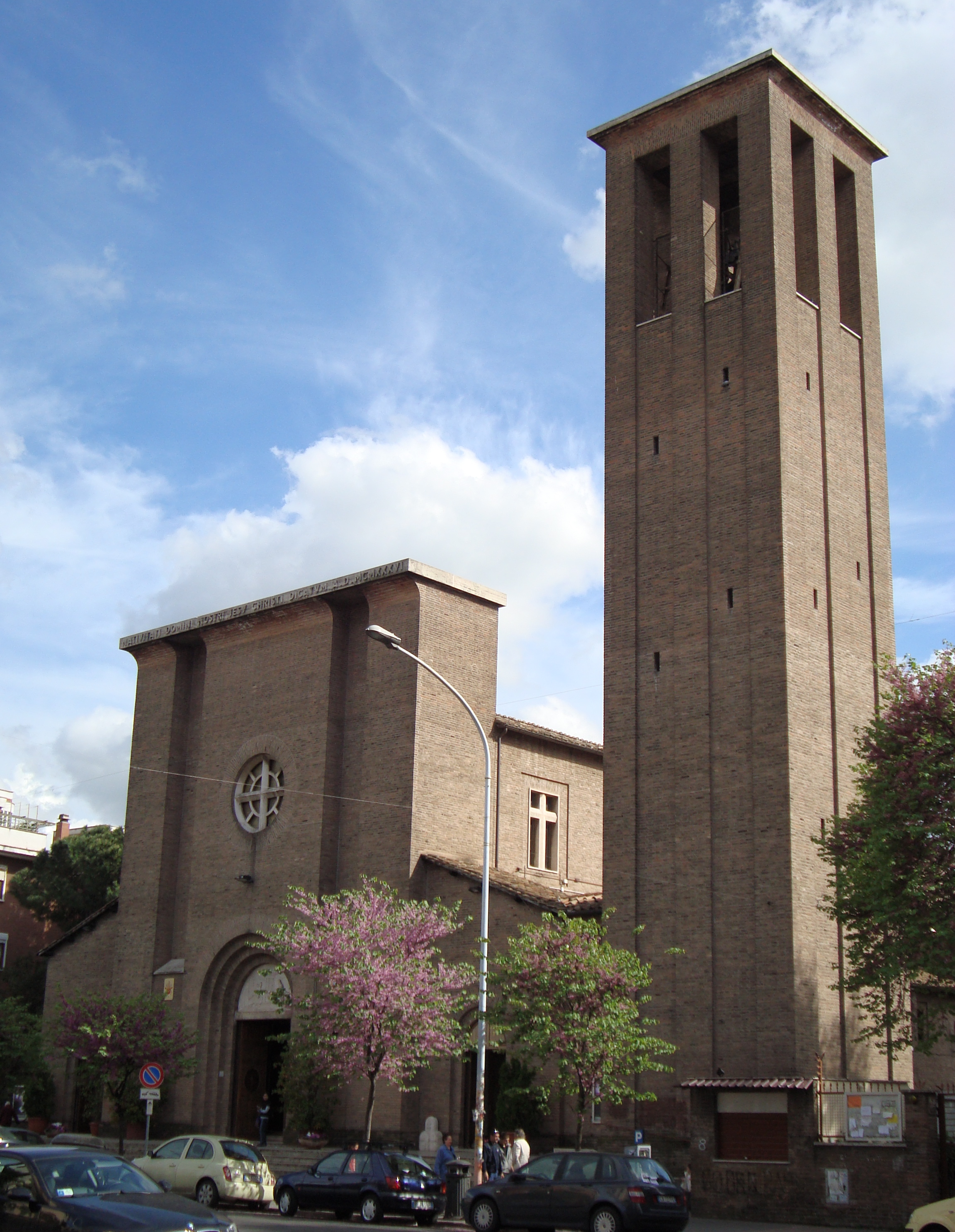
- Facade
- Click on the map for a fullscreen view
- 41°52′50″N 12°30′19″E
- Location: Via Urbisaglia 2, Rome
- Country: Italy
- Denomination: Roman Catholic
- Tradition: Roman Rite

History
- Status: Titular church
- Dedication: Nativity of Jesus
- Consecrated: 1937

Architecture
- Architect: Tullio Rossi
- Architectural type: Church
- Groundbreaking: 1936
- Completed: 1937

Administration
- District: Lazio
- Province: Rome

The church of the Nativity of Our Lord Jesus Christ is a place of worship of Rome, in the Appio Latino district, in via Gallia.

== History ==
The church, built on a design by Tullio Rossi in 1936, was erected a parish March 12, 1937 with the decree of the Cardinal Vicar Francesco Marchetti Selvaggiani "Succrescente in dies", and is home of the titular church "Nativity of Our Lord Jesus Christ in Via Gallia "founded by Pope Paul VI in 1969. Audrys Juozas Bačkis is the incumbent cardinal-protector since 2001.

In the 60s during the celebration of Corpus Christi from the church he started a procession that crossed the streets of the neighborhood, and (after having transited via Britannia full of stalls) expired on Armenia square where it had been made un'infiorata that many still remember in the neighborhood.

== Description ==
=== Art and Architecture ===
In the facade they are inserted a rosette and a central portal, above which, in the lunette, there is a bas-relief with the representation of the Annunciation. High bell tower is located on the left side of the church. The interior has three naves, divided by pillars, with a trussed ceiling. In the nave there is the baptismal basin for immersion baptism: it has an octagonal shape; The roof consists of five panels with glass windows, depicting the image of the Madonna and the symbols of the four evangelists. On the pillars of the nave is the Way of the Cross in mosaic. The deep presbytery houses an altar of considerable size and square shape; apse a large mosaic of Nagni Guild depicting the Nativity of Jesus and the Holy Family. The tabernacle is the work of Geoffrey Verginelli. The aisles end with apses. In the left one there is a mosaic depicting Christ, while in the right aisle another mosaic with Pentecost.

=== Organ Pipes ===
In the church is the organ Mascioni reeds opus 530. Built in 1940, was restored in 1983; on this occasion, the transmission system, electric, has been overhauled and the console moved from the choir loft above the entrance to the left of the presbytery. The instrument is placed into two bodies over the choir in the counter and has two keyboards of 58 notes each and radial concave pedalboard 58.

== Cardinal Priest ==
Pope Paul VI established as titular church on 30 April 1969.

- Paul Gouyon, 30 April 1969 appointed-26 September 2000 died
- Audrys Juozas Bačkis, 21 February 2001 appointed- present
