= Cathedral of St. Ignatius of Loyola, Vilnius =

Coordinates: 54.6827°N 25.2821°E

Cathedral of St. Ignatius of Loyola
- Šv. Ignoto katedra
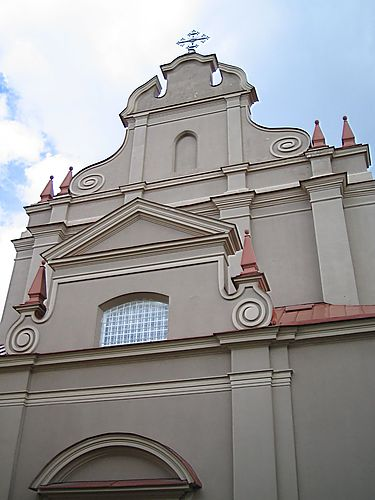
- Cathedral of St. Ignatius of Loyola
- Location: Vilnius
- Country: Lithuania
- Denomination: Roman Catholic Church

The Cathedral of St. Ignatius of Loyola (Lithuanian: Šv. Ignoto katedra) also called Church of St. Ignatius (Šv. Ignoto bažnyčia) is a religious building of the Roman Catholic Church that serves as the cathedral of the Military Ordinariate of Lithuania. It is located in the capital, Vilnius.

== History ==
The first Jesuits arrived in Vilnius in 1602, they opened an internship in the city, and began construction of the church of St. Ignatius in 1622 in the Baroque style. The church was consecrated by Archbishop Lubartowicz Sanguszko in 1647. The fire of 1748 devastated Vilnius and numerous historic buildings, including the church of St. Ignatius. It was restored in the late Baroque style.

In 1925, the church became a place of worship for the Polish garrison and the interior was renovated with new fresh, instead of the old decorations that were lost. The church was closed in 1945 when Vilnius was incorporated into the Lithuanian Soviet Socialist Republic, and used as a cinema and a concert hall of the Philharmonic Orchestra of the city, while the monastery became a technical library. After the dissolution of the Soviet Union, the church returned to the Archdiocese of Vilnius and was restored in 2001–2003.

On 23 November 2004, the church was elevated to cathedral of the Military Ordinariate of Lithuania.

== See also ==
- Roman Catholicism in Lithuania
- Cathedral of St. Ignatius Loyola (Palm Beach, Florida)
- List of Jesuit sites

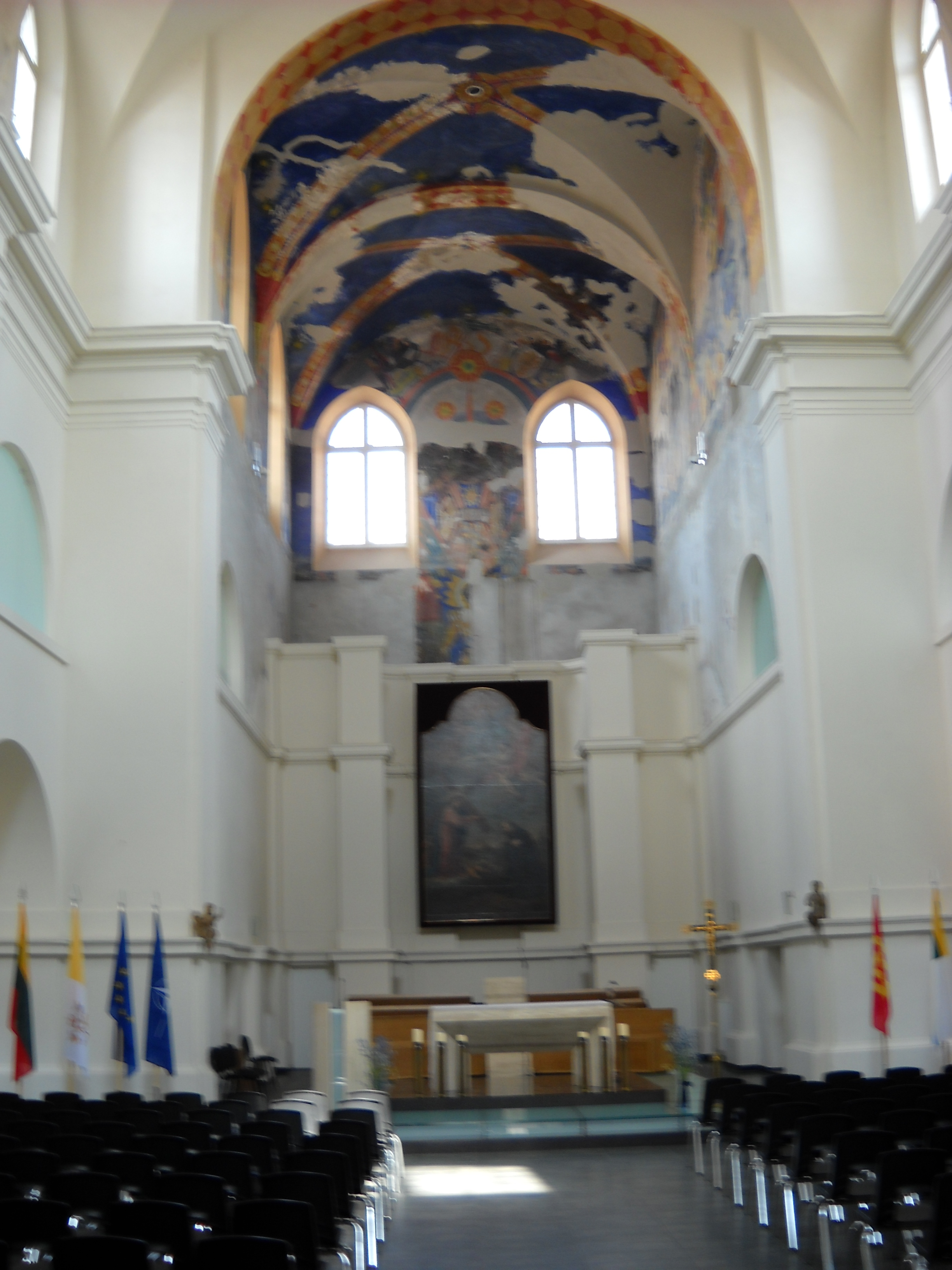
Internal view
