= Audrys Bačkis =

Lithuanian prelate

His Eminence Audrys Bačkis
- Cardinal, Archbishop Emeritus of Vilnius
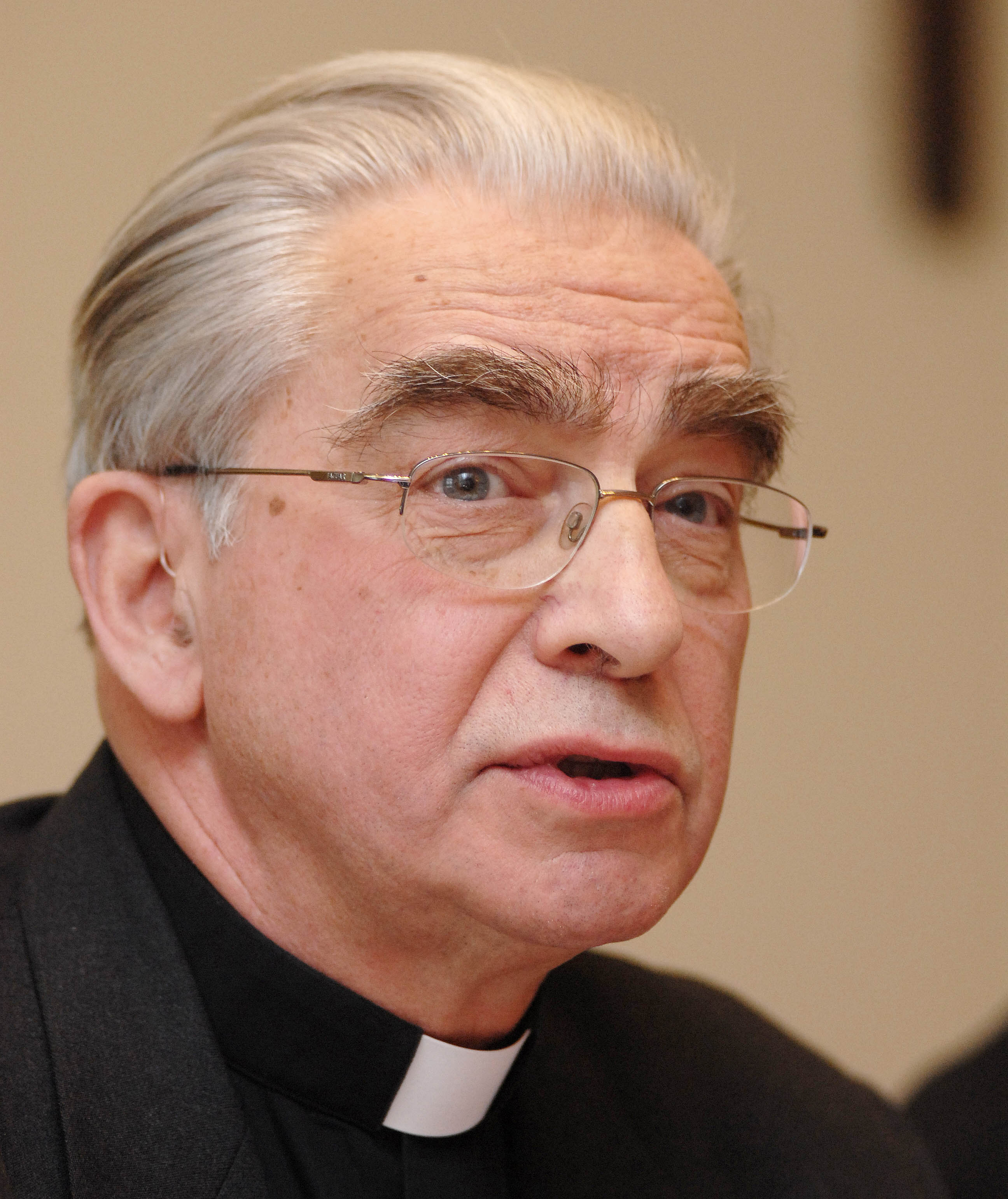
- Cardinal Bačkis
- Church: Catholic Church
- Archdiocese: Vilnius
- Province: Vilnius
- Appointed: 24 December 1991
- Term ended: 5 April 2013
- Predecessor: Julijonas Steponavičius
- Successor: Gintaras Grušas
- Other post: Cardinal Priest of Natività di Nostro Signore Gesù Cristo a Via Gallia
- Previous posts: Titular Archbishop of Meta (1988–1991); Apostolic Pro-Nuncio to Netherlands (1988–1991)

Orders
- Ordination: 18 March 1961 by Luigi Traglia
- Consecration: 4 October 1988 by John Paul II
- Created cardinal: 21 February 2001 by John Paul II
- Rank: Cardinal Priest

Personal details
- Born: Audrys Juozas Bačkis; 1 February 1937 (age 89) Kaunas, Lithuania
- Denomination: Roman Catholic
- Parents: Stasys Antanas Bačkis
- Motto: sub tuum praesidium
- Coat of arms

Styles of Audrys Juozas Bačkis
- Reference style: His Eminence
- Spoken style: Your Eminence
- Informal style: Cardinal
- See: Vilnius (emeritus)

Audrys Juozas Bačkis (Lithuanian: [ɐʊˈdʲrʲiːs ˈjuɔzɐs ˈbaːtɕkʲɪs]; born 1 February 1937) is a Lithuanian prelate of the Catholic Church and a cardinal since 2001. He worked in the diplomatic service of the Holy See from 1964 to 1991, when he became Archbishop of Vilnius. He retired in 2013.

== Early life ==
Bačkis was born in Kaunas to the family of Stasys Antanas Bačkis, a Lithuanian diplomat. In 1938 Bačkis' father was assigned to Paris where the family stayed after the Soviet occupation in June 1940. He completed his secondary education at the Institute Saint-Marie-de-Monceau, and studied philosophy at the Seminary of Saint-Sulpice in Issy-les-Moulineaux.

Bačkis studied at the Pontifical Gregorian University, Pontifical Ecclesiastical Academy, and Pontifical Lateran University, there Bačkis obtained his doctorate in canon law. Bačkis was ordained to the priesthood by Luigi Traglia on 18 March 1961, in Rome. He then did pastoral work among Lithuanian Americans in the United States, and finished his studies in Rome in 1964.

== Service ==
In 1964 he entered the diplomatic service of the Holy See, serving as secretary of the nunciature to the Philippines (1964–1965), to Costa Rica (1965–1967), to Turkey (1967–1970), and to Nigeria (1970–1973). Bačkis was raised to the rank of Privy Chamberlain of His Holiness on 26 June 1965, and was called to the Council of Public Affairs of the Church in the Secretariat of State in 1973. He was the Vatican's delegate to the United Nations Conference in Vienna in 1975, and became Vice-Secretary of the Council for the Public Affairs of the Church in 1979.

On 5 August 1988, Bačkis was appointed Pro-Nuncio to the Netherlands and Titular Archbishop of Meta by Pope John Paul II. He received his episcopal consecration on the following 4 October from Pope John Paul himself, with Cardinal Achille Silvestrini and Bishop Juozas Preikšas serving as co-consecrators, in St. Peter's Basilica.

He was named Archbishop of Vilnius on 24 December 1991.

John Paul II created him Cardinal Priest of Natività di Nostro Signore Gesù Cristo a Via Gallia in the consistory of 21 February 2001. Bačkis was one of the cardinal electors who participated in the 2005 papal conclave that selected Pope Benedict XVI as well as in the one in 2013 which selected Pope Francis. Since having reached the age of 80, Bačkis is no longer eligible to vote in any future conclaves.

Within the Lithuanian Episcopal Conference, he has been president (1993–1999, 2002–2005) and vice-president (1999–2002, 2005–2011). Besides his native Lithuanian, the Cardinal speaks English, French, German, Italian, Polish, and has a limited comprehension of Dutch. He is also known as one of the Catholic hierarchy's better Latin speakers.

== Retirement ==
Pope Francis accepted Bačkis's resignation on 5 April 2013.

Pope Francis named Bačkis as his Special Envoy to celebrations marking the 1,025th anniversary of the Baptism (Conversion) of the Kievan Rus, to be held in Kyiv, Ukraine, on 17 and 18 August 2013.

== Honours ==
- Lithuania: Commander's Grand Cross of the Order of the Lithuanian Grand Duke Gediminas (11 February 2000)
- Lithuania: Grand Cross of the Order of Vytautas the Great (3 February 2003)

Diplomatic posts
Preceded by Edward Idris Cassidy	Apostolic Pro-Nuncio to the Netherlands; 5 August 1988 – 24 December 1991	Succeeded by Henri Lemaître
Catholic Church titles
Preceded by Antonio María Javierre Ortas	— TITULAR — Titular Archbishop of Meta; 5 August 1988 – 24 December 1991	Succeeded by Diego Causero
Preceded by Julijonas Steponavičius	Archbishop of Vilnius; 24 December 1991 – 5 April 2013	Succeeded by Gintaras Linas Grušas
Preceded by Paul Gouyon	Cardinal Priest of Natività di Nostro Signore Gesù Cristo a Via Gallia; 21 February 2001 –	Incumbent
