= Clément Roques =

French Cardinal

His Eminence Clément-Émile Roques
- Archbishop of Rennes
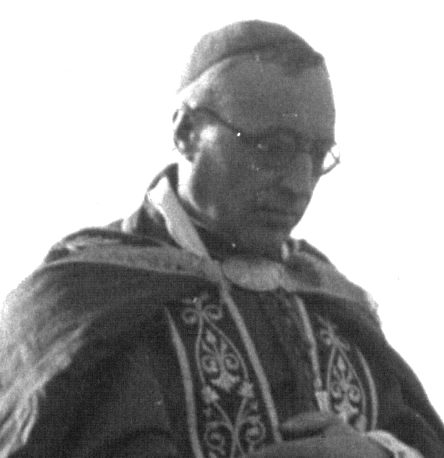
- Roques between 1934 and 1940.
- Church: Roman Catholic Church
- Archdiocese: Rennes
- See: Rennes
- Appointed: 11 May 1940
- Term ended: 4 September 1964
- Predecessor: René-Pierre Mignen
- Successor: Paul Gouyon
- Other post: Cardinal-Priest of Santa Balbina (1946-64)
- Previous posts: Bishop of Montauban (1929-34); Archbishop of Aix (1934-40)

Orders
- Ordination: 2 April 1904 by Louis-Eugène Francqueville
- Consecration: 24 June 1929 by Pierre-Célestin Cézerac
- Created cardinal: 18 February 1946 by Pope Pius XII
- Rank: Cardinal-Priest

Personal details
- Born: Clément-Émile Roques; 8 December 1880 Saint Pierre des Ports, Graulhet, French Third Republic
- Baptised: 8 December 1880
- Died: 4 September 1964 (aged 83) Rennes, France
- Buried: Rennes Cathedral
- Motto: In fide et lenitate ("In faith and sweetness")
- Coat of arms

Styles of Clément-Émile Roques
- Reference style: His Eminence
- Spoken style: Your Eminence
- Informal style: Cardinal
- See: Rennes

Clément-Émile Roques (8 December 1880—4 September 1964) was a French Cardinal of the Roman Catholic Church. He served as Archbishop of Rennes from 1940 until his death, and was elevated to the cardinalate in 1946 by Pope Pius XII.

== Biography ==
Born in Graulhet, Clément-Émile Roques studied at the seminary in Albi and the Catholic Institute of Toulouse before being ordained to the priesthood on 2 April 1904. He then served as a professor, administrator, the prefect of studies, and superior of the seminary of Barral, in Castres, until 1929.

On 15 April 1929 Roques was appointed Bishop of Montauban by Pope Pius XI. He received his episcopal consecration on the following 24 June from Archbishop Pierre-Celestin Cézerac, with Archbishop Jules-Géraud Saliège and Bishop Charles Challiol serving as co-consecrators, in the Cathedral of Albi. Roques was later named Archbishop of Aix on 24 December 1934, and Archbishop of Rennes on 11 May 1940.

Pope Pius XII created him Cardinal Priest of S. Balbina in the consistory of 18 February 1946. He was papal legate to the 1947 National Eucharistic Congress in Nantes, and to the 1956 Congress in his see of Rennes. A cardinal elector in the 1958 papal conclave, Roques lived only long enough to attend the first two sessions of the Second Vatican Council from 1962 to 1963, and participate in the conclave of 1963 that selected Pope Paul VI. During his tenure as Archbishop, the Cardinal confirmed three miracles attributed to Our Lady of Lourdes.

Roques died in Rennes aged 83. He is buried in the Metropolitan Cathedral of St. Peter.

Catholic Church titles
Preceded by Pierre-Alexandre Marty	Bishop of Montauban; 1929–1934	Succeeded by Eli-Antoine Durand
Preceded by Emmanuel Coste	Archbishop of Aix; 1934–1940	Succeeded by Florent-Joseph du Bois de la Villerabel
Preceded by René-Pierre Mignen	Archbishop of Rennes; 1940–1964	Succeeded by Paul Gouyon
