= Jan Kazimierz Umiastowski =

Polish szlachcic

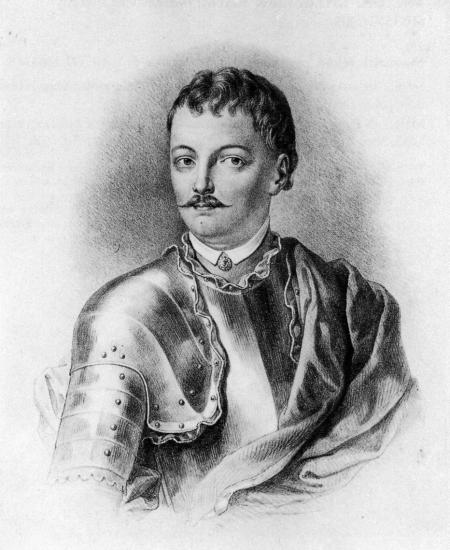
- Jan Kazimierz Umiastowski
- Coat of arms: Roch III
- Died: 1659
- Noble family: Umiastowski
- Consort: Halszka princess Ogiński
- Father: Jan comes von Nandelstädt Umiastowski

Jan Kazimierz Umiastowski (died 1659) was a Polish szlachcic from family - comites Pierzchała-Umiastowski.

== Life ==
He was District Writer of Brześć since 1648, District Judge and Podkomorzy (Chamberlain) of Brześć; since 1654.

Marshal of the Sejm (nadzwyczajnego) in 1655 in Warsaw.
