= Umiastowski =

Polish noble-aristocratic family

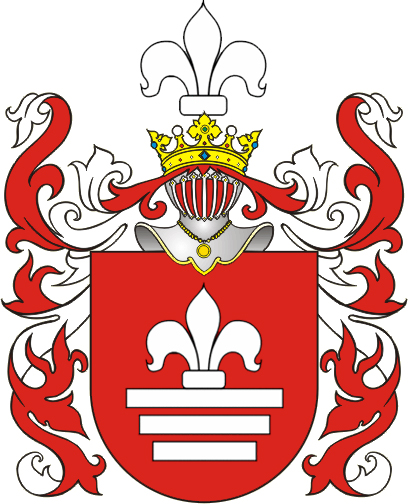
The family coat of arms Roch III (Pierzchała)

Umiastowski-von Nandelstädt is a Polish noble-aristocratic family and one of oldest aristocratic lines in Central and Eastern Europe with records in Poland going back to 1238 (Rościsław Pierzchała-prefectus plociensis, haetmanus mazoviensis).

== History ==
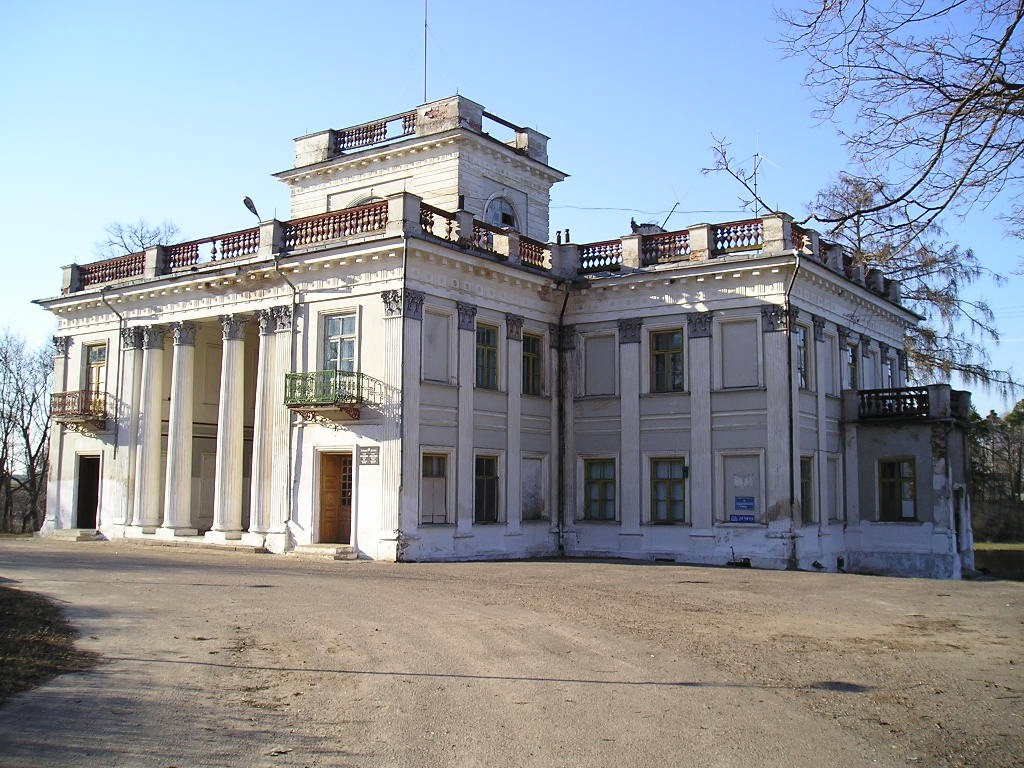
palace Zemloslaw -property of comites Umiastowskis

The Umiastowski family line is a Polish line. Their origins date back to the Piast dynasty period. The Umiastowskis possessed numerous estates in Mazovia, Kuyavia, and Lesser Poland. The progenitor of the family, Rościsław, was a starost of Płock and hetman under Konrad I of Masovia.

At one point in time the Umiastowskis settled in Livonia, an area now belonging to Latvia and Estonia. As of the 16th century the full family name has been von Nandelstädt Umiastowski, the first part being granted to them by Christina of Sweden.

== Land holdings ==
The Umiastowski property included:

- In Livland: Schluckum, Waux-Moysen, Winkiel-Moysen
- In the former Grand Duchy of Lithuania: Sobotniki, Żemłosław (now Žamyslaŭĺ, Belarus), Opita-Talkowszczyzna, Szakarnia, Czerwony Dwór, Stoki, Klewica, Puzyniewicze, etc.

Jan Kazimierz von Nandelstädt comes Umiastowski

- In Poland: Rękoraj
- Two palaces in Vilnius
- One palace in Warsaw

== From Pierzchała to Umiastowski ==
The Pierzchała family changed their name from Pierzchała to Umiastowski in the 15th century, when they owned the town of Umiastów near Warsaw (in Duchy of Mazovia).

== Members ==
Representatives of the family included:

- Iwan komes Pierzchała of Radomin (Duchy Stettin (Stettin))- 14th century
- Barbora Žagarietė - 17th century
- Jan Kazimierz von Nandelstädt Umiastowski - 17th century

Władysław count Umiastowski

- Władysław count Umiastowski - 19th century
- Janina Zofia Umiastowska (1860-1941)

== Coat of arms and motto ==
- Coat of arms: Roch III
- Motto: Frangas non Flectas

== Genealogy ==
- Genealogy of the family comites Umiastowski(polish)

== Bibliography ==
- Amiklar Kosiński - "Przewodnik Heraldyczny " Warszawa 1848
- Janina Umiastowska - Nałęcz - "Szmat Ziemi i Życia " Wilno 1928
- Czeslaw Jankowski - Powiat Oszmianski "Rodzina Umiastowskich" Wilno 1922
- Praca Zbiorowa: Szlachta Wielkiego Ksiestwa Litewskiego - Warszawa 1998
- Slawomir Leitgeber: Alamanach Blekitny - Poznan 1997 i wznowienia
- Archives of Foundation "Frangas non Flectas"
