= Władysław Umiastowski =

Polish szlachcic

- Władysław Nicefor Umiastowski, count
- Coat of arms: Roch III
- Born: 13 March 1834; Sobotniki
- Died: 16 January 1905 (aged 70); Wilno
- Noble family: Umiastowski
- Consort: Janina Countess Ostroróg – Sadowska
- Father: Jakub Count von Nandelstädt Umiastowski
- Mother: Józefina Countess Dunin – Rajecka

Władysław Nicefor Count Umiastowski was a Polish szlachcic from the family of the Counts Pierzchała-Umiastowski. He was marshal of szlachta in Ashmyany.

His property was:

- Żemłosław, Grand Duchy of Lithuania, now Žamyslaŭĺ, Belarus
- Rękoraj in Poland
- Puzyniewicze, Grand Duchy of Lithuania
