= Paul Gouyon =

French cardinal

His Eminence Paul Gouyon
- Archbishop Emeritus of Rennes
- Church: Roman Catholic Church
- Archdiocese: Rennes
- See: Rennes
- Appointed: 4 September 1964
- Term ended: 15 October 1985
- Predecessor: Clément-Émile Roques
- Successor: Jacques André Marie Jullien
- Other post: Cardinal-Priest of Natività di Nostro Signore Gesù Cristo a Via Gallia (1969-2000)
- Previous posts: Bishop of Bayonne (1957-63); Coadjutor Archbishop of Rennes (1963-64); Titular Archbishop of Pessinus (1963-64)

Orders
- Ordination: 13 March 1937
- Consecration: 7 October 1957 by Paul-Marie-Alexandre Richaud
- Created cardinal: 28 April 1969 by Pope Paul VI
- Rank: Cardinal-Priest

Personal details
- Born: Paul-Joseph-Marie Gouyon; 24 October 1910 Bordeaux, French Third Republic
- Died: 26 September 2000 (aged 89) Bordeaux, France
- Education: University of Bordeaux; Pontifical Gregorian University; Institut Catholique de Paris
- Motto: In Spiritu et veritate
- Coat of arms

Styles of Paul Gouyon
- Reference style: His Eminence
- Spoken style: Your Eminence
- Informal style: Cardinal
- See: Rennes (emeritus)

Paul Joseph Marie Gouyon (24 October 1910 – 26 September 2000) was a French cardinal of the Roman Catholic Church. He served as Archbishop of Rennes from 1964 to 1985, and was elevated to the cardinalate in 1969.

== Biography ==
Paul Gouyon was born in Bordeaux, and studied at the University of and Seminary of Bordeaux. He also attended the Seminary of Saint-Sulpice in Paris, the Pontifical Gregorian University in Rome, and the Catholic Institute of Paris.

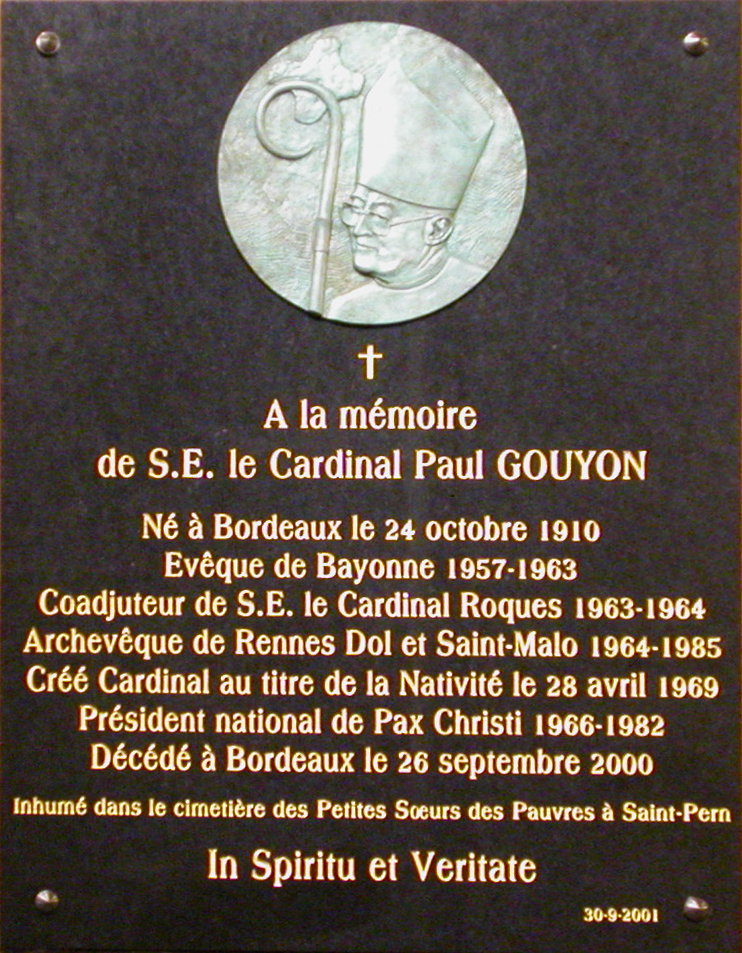

Gouyon was ordained to the priesthood on 13 March 1937, and finished his studies in 1939. After serving in the French Army during World War II from 1939 to 1940, he began pastoral work in Bordeaux, serving as pastor of Montussan and of Beychac (1940–1944), chaplain of the lycée Michel-Montaigne (1944–1951), and vicar general of the archdiocese. He was raised to the rank of Domestic Prelate of His Holiness on 6 April 1955.

On 6 August 1957, Gouyon was appointed Bishop of Bayonne by Pope Pius XII. He received his episcopal consecration on the following 7 October from Archbishop Paul Richaud, with Archbishop Joseph Martin and Bishop Louis Guyot serving as co-consecrators, in the Cathedral of Saint-André. Gouyon attended the Second Vatican Council from 1962 to 1965, and was promoted to Coadjutor Archbishop of Rennes and Titular Archbishop of Pessinus on 6 August 1963. He succeeded Clément-Emile Roques as Archbishop of Rennes on 4 September 1964.

Pope Paul VI created him Cardinal-Priest of Natività di Nostro Signore Gesù Cristo in via Gallia in the consistory of 28 April 1969. Gouyon was one of the cardinal electors who participated in the conclaves of August and October 1978, which selected Popes John Paul I and John Paul II. He was also named the national president of Pax Christi. He resigned his post as Archbishop on 15 October 1985, after a period of twenty-one years, and lost the right to participate in conclaves upon reaching the age of eighty on 24 October 1990.

Cardinal Gouyon died in Bordeaux at age 89 and was buried in the cemetery of the Mother House of the Little Sisters of the Poor in Saint-Pern.

Catholic Church titles
Preceded by Léon-Albert Terrier	Bishop of Bayonne; 1957–1963	Succeeded by Jean-Paul-Marie Vincent
Preceded by Clément-Emile Roques	Archbishop of Rennes; 1964–1985	Succeeded by Jacques André Marie Jullien
