= Roman Catholic Diocese of Šiauliai =

Roman Catholic diocese in Lithuania

Coordinates: 55°56′N 23°19′E

Diocese of Šiauliai Dioecesis Siauliensis Šiaulių vyskupija
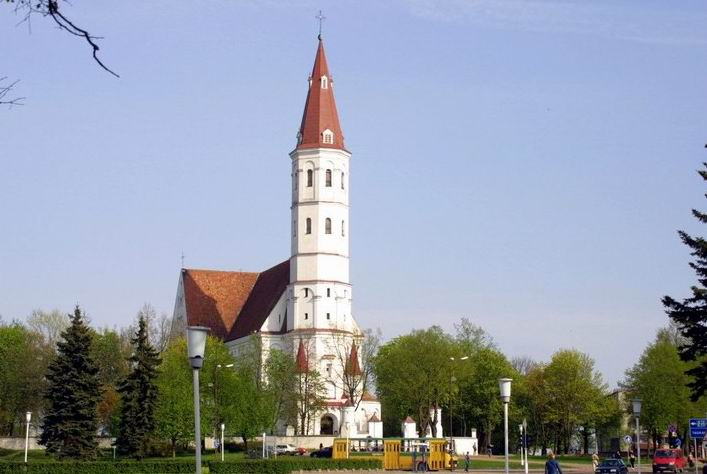
- Šiauliai Cathedral in the center of Šiauliai

Location
- Country: Lithuania
- Ecclesiastical province: Kaunas
- Metropolitan: Kaunas

Statistics
- Area: 7,696 km^{2} (2,971 sq mi)
- Population: Total; Catholics: (as of 2022); 222,686; 194,358 (87.3%)
- Parishes: 68

Information
- Denomination: Roman Catholic
- Sui iuris church: Latin Church
- Rite: Roman Rite
- Established: 28 May 1997; 29 years ago
- Cathedral: Cathedral of Saints Peter and Paul Šiauliai
- Patron saint: Mary Immaculate
- Secular priests: 61 (50 Diocesan, 11 Religious Orders)

Current leadership
- Pope: Leo XIV
- Bishop: Darius Trijonis
- Metropolitan Archbishop: Kęstutis Kėvalas
- Bishops emeritus: Eugenijus Bartulis

Map
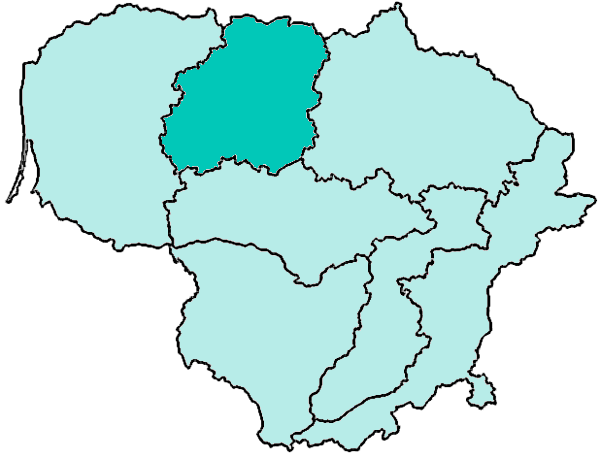
- Map of the Diocese

Website
- Website of the Diocese

Diocese of Šiauliai (Latin: Dioecesis Siauliensis) is a Roman Catholic Diocese of Lithuania. The current bishop is Darius Trijonis (since 2024). The diocese in present structure and territory was established on May 27, 1997.

The diocese covers an area of 7,696 km^{2} (2,971 sq mi), and is a suffragate of the Archdiocese of Kaunas. In 2004 the diocese of Šiauliai had about 269,861 believers (79.7% of the population), 65 priests and 67 parishes.

The Cathedral of Saints Peter and Paul in Šiauliai has been assigned as the Cathedral of the diocese. The main pilgrimage place is Hill of Crosses.

== Leadership ==
=== Bishops of Šiauliai ===
- Eugenijus Bartulis (28 May 1997 – 8 Dec 2024), retired
- Darius Trijonis (8 Dec 2024 – )
