= Rękoraj =

- Village
- Location within Poland
- Coordinates: 51°31′N 19°39′E
- Country: Poland
- Voivodeship: Łódź
- County: Piotrków
- Gmina: Moszczenica
- Population: 660

Rękoraj [rɛŋˈkɔrai̯] is a village in the administrative district of Gmina Moszczenica, within Piotrków County, Łódź Voivodeship, in central Poland.
