= Roch III coat of arms =

Polish coat of arms

Roch III
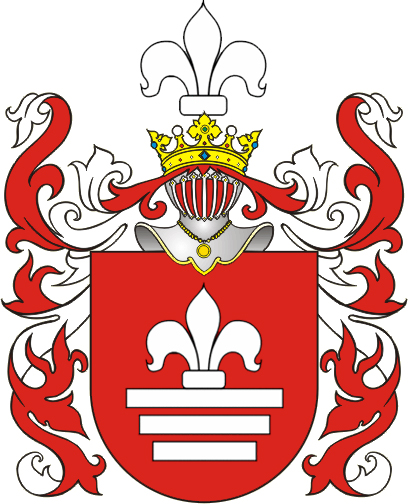
- Alternative names: Pierzchała, Skała Łamana, Roch II also
- Earliest mention: 1238 by Rościsław comes Pierzchała
- Towns: none
- Families: 24 families altogether: Borowski, Broliński, Karsza, Kościuszko, Łukomski, Niereski, Obuch, Oczko, Omelański, Omeliański, Piekucki, Pielaszkowski, Pietrzejowski, Pilaszkowski, Plewiński, Plewka, Pogroszewski, Przezdziecki, Przeździecki Pierzchała, Rossudowski, Rosudowski, Rzeźnicki, Siechnowicki, Suzin, Umiastowski, Walużyniec, Woszczatyński, Zaboklicki

Roch III is a Polish coat of arms. It was used by several szlachta families in the times of the Polish–Lithuanian Commonwealth.

== Blazon ==
Gules, fleur-de-lis on three steps Argent

== Notable bearers ==
Notable bearers of this coat of arms include:

- Tadeusz Kościuszko
- Jan Kazimierz von Nandelstädt Umiastowski

== See also ==
- Polish heraldry
- Heraldry
- Coat of arms
