= Eugenijus Bartulis =

Lithuanian Roman Catholic prelate

The Most Reverend Eugenijus Bartulis
- Bishop of Šiauliai
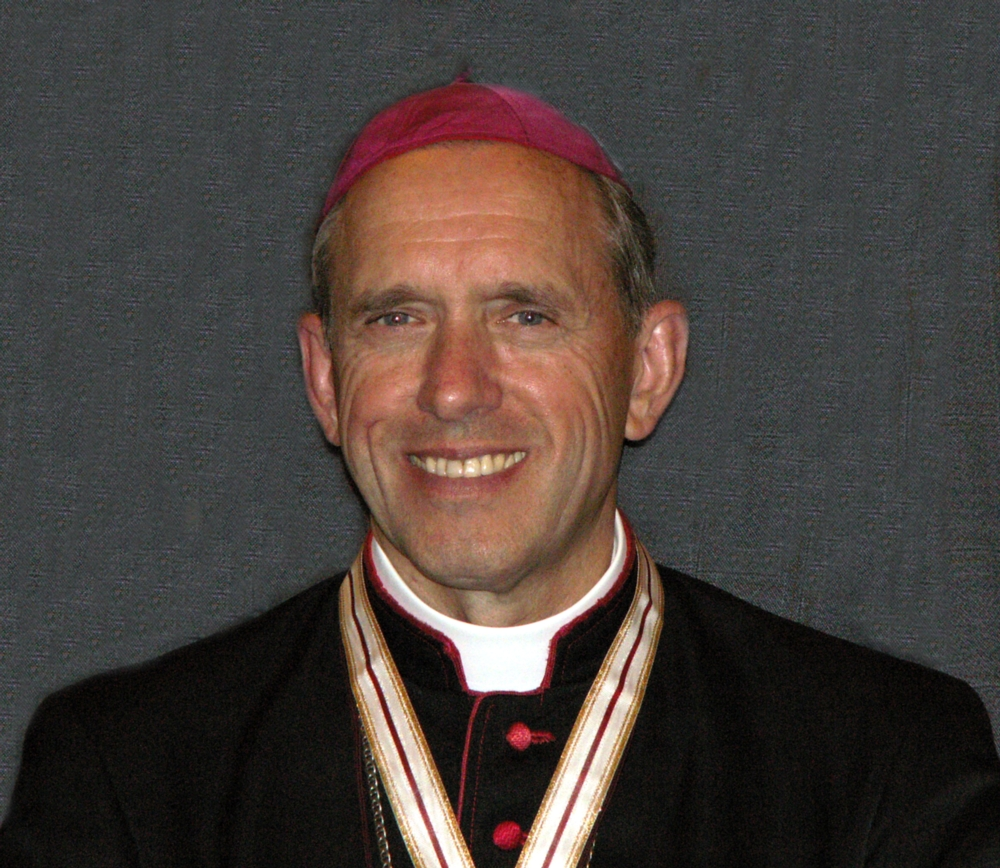
- Church: Catholic Church
- Diocese: Šiauliai
- Appointed: 28 May 1997
- Previous post: Military Ordinary of Lithuania (2000-10)

Orders
- Ordination: 30 May 1976
- Consecration: 29 June 1997 by Sigitas Tamkevičius

Personal details
- Born: Eugenijus Bartulis; 7 December 1949 (age 76) Kaunas, Lithuania
- Education: Kaunas seminary
- Motto: Gaudete semper in Domino
- Coat of arms

Eugenijus Bartulis (born 7 December 1949) is a Lithuanian prelate of the Catholic Church who served as the bishop of Šiauliai from 1997 to 2024.

== Biography ==
Eugenijus Bartulis was born in Kaunas on 7 December 1949. He graduated from secondary school in Kaunas in 1968 and studied at the Kaunas Interdiocesan Seminary from 1971 to 1976. Bartulis was ordained a priest on 30 May 1976.

From 1976 to 1986, Bartulis worked as a vicar in the parishes of Kelmė, Radviliškis and Kaunas. From 1986 to 1989, he was pastor of the parishes of Deltuva and Bukonys. In 1989, he was appointed administrator of Kaunas Cathedral. In 1990, he was named chancellor of the curia of the Archdiocese of Kaunas. He later became pastor of one of the largest parishes in Kaunas and then taught and served as spiritual director of the Kaunas Seminary. On 1 June 1996, Bartulis was appointed its rector.

On 28 May 1997, Pope John Paul II appointed him bishop of the newly established Diocese of Šiauliai. He received his episcopal consecration on 29 June 1997 in Kaunas Cathedral. On 13 July he was installed in the Cathedral of the Apostles Peter and Paul in Šiauliai.

On 25 November 2000, he was given the additional responsibility as ordinary of the Military Ordinariate of Lithuania. Pope Benedict XVI accepted his resignation from that position on 2 July 2010.

Within the Lithuanian Bishops' Conference, he chaired the Council on Ecumenical Relations from 2014 to 2017.

Darius Trijonis, Auxiliary Bishop of Vilnius, was appointed coadjutor bishop on 6 June 2024 in anticipation of his Bartulis' retirement.
