= Toras Chaim =

Toras Chaim may refer to:

- Kollel Toras Chaim, South Africa, a component of Ohr Somayach, South Africa
- Yeshiva Toras Chaim, Denver
- Yeshiva Toras Chaim (Jerusalem), Jerusalem
- Yeshiva Toras Chaim (East New York), a defunct yeshiva in Brooklyn
- Yeshiva Toras Chaim of South Shore, Hewlett, New York
- Toras Chaim (Chabad), a multi-volume work of Chabad philosophy by the dynasty's second Rebbe, Rabbi Dovber Schneuri
- Toras Chaim, commentary on the Talmud by Rabbi Avraham Hayim Shor

== See also ==
- Torat Chaim Yeshiva
