= Tytuvėnai =

- Town
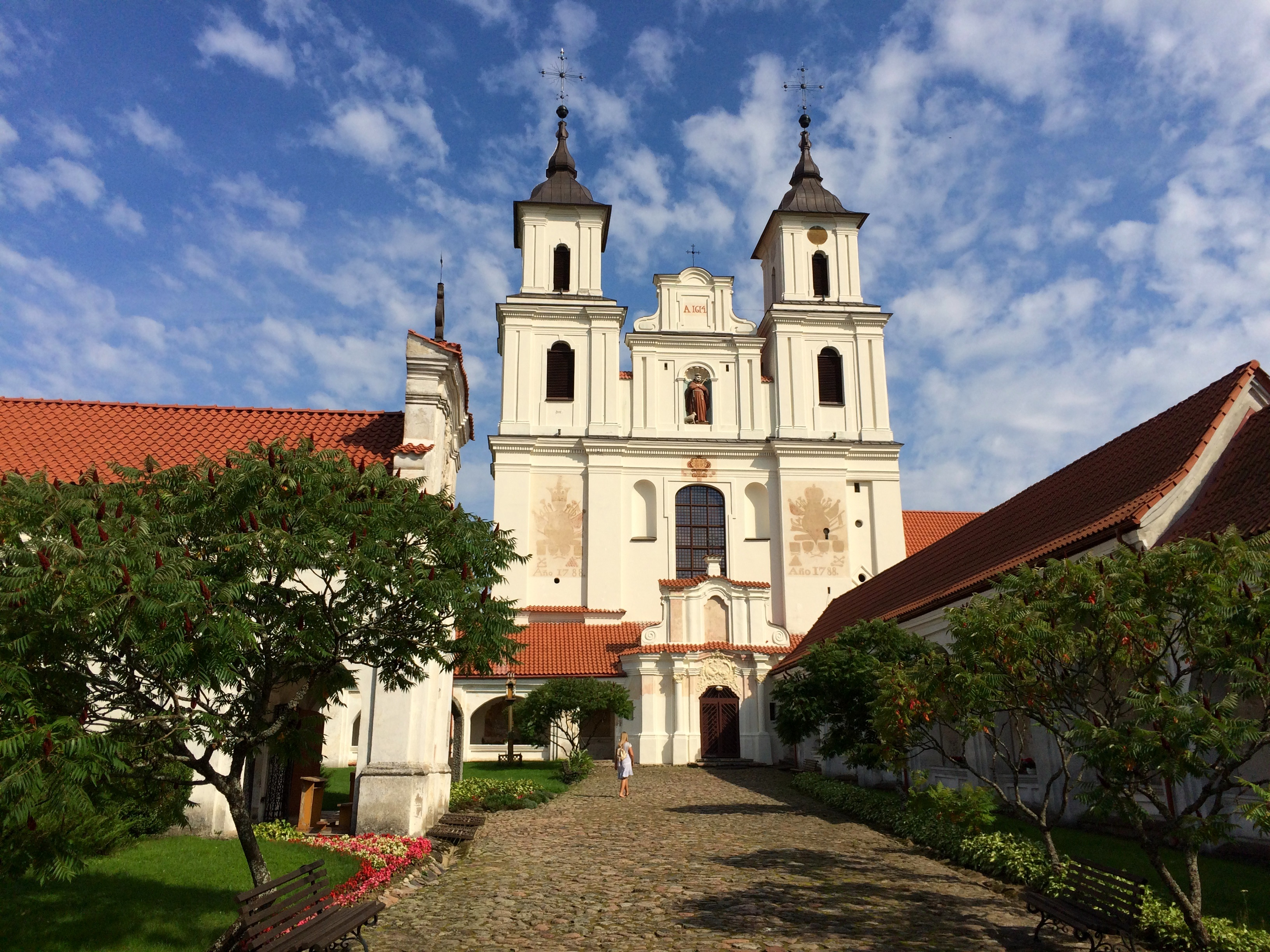
- Church of Blessed Virgin Mary, the Queen Of Angels

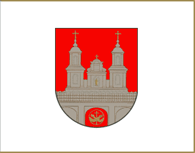
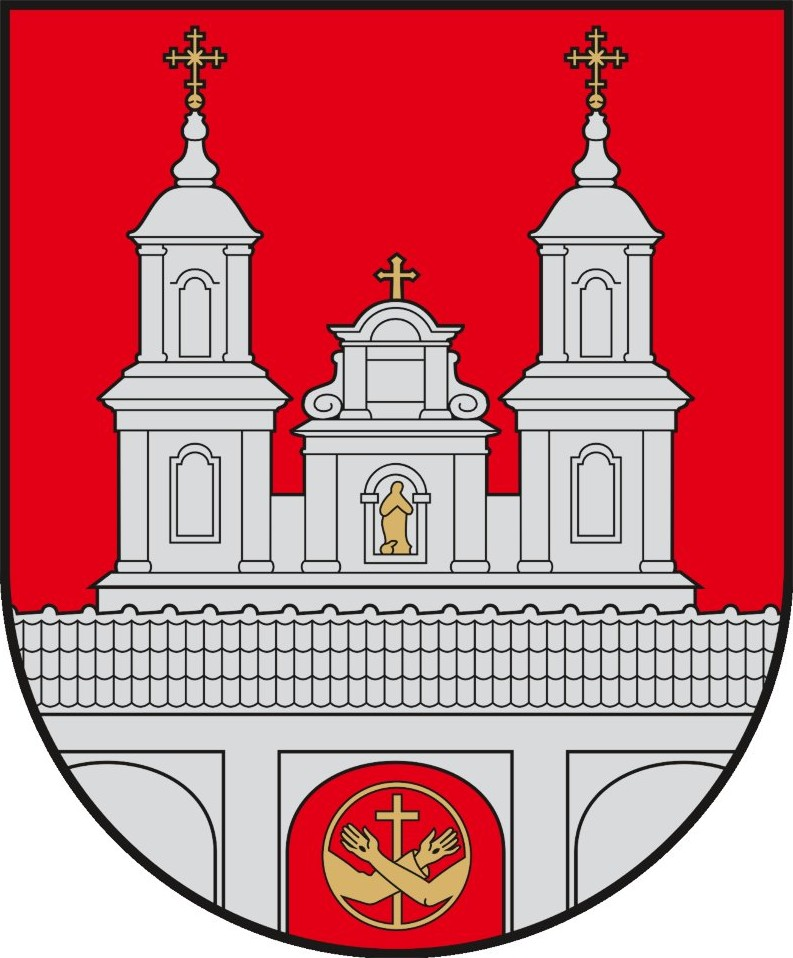
- Flag Coat of arms

- Location of Tytuvėnai
- Coordinates: 55°36′0″N 23°12′0″E
- Country: Lithuania
- Ethnographic region: Samogitia
- County: Šiauliai County
- Municipality: Kelmė district municipality
- Eldership: Tytuvėnai eldership
- Capital of: Tytuvėnai eldership
- First mentioned: 1500
- Granted city rights: 1956

Population (2021)
  - Total: 1,805
- Time zone: UTC+2 (EET)
  - Summer (DST): UTC+3 (EEST)

Tytuvėnai is a town in the Kelmė district municipality, Lithuania. It is located 17 km (11 mi) east of Kelmė. It is known for its Bernardine monastery.

== History ==
Tytuvėnai was first mentioned in historical records at the end of the 14th century, during which time a wooden castle stood on a hillfort overlooking Lake Bridvaišis. In 1555, the settlement's first wooden church was constructed on the site of a former pagan shrine, which is known today as St. George's Hill.

On May 12, 1609, Andrius Valavičius, the Grand Standard-Bearer of Lithuania and a judge of the Samogitian Land Court, purchased Tytuvėnai for 11,000 silver coins. Having reverted to Catholicism during the Counter-Reformation, Valavičius and his family initiated the construction of the Tytuvėnai Monastery adjacent to the town's old church. In 1614, Valavičius drafted the founding charter for the monastery and church, and endowed the project with 10,000 silver coins. Following his death later that same year, the execution of his will fell to Jeronimas Valavičius, the Treasurer of the Lithuania, who commenced construction in 1618. With additional financial support from other Samogitian nobles, construction continued into the late 18th century. In 1633 the main part of monastery and church was completed. In 1772–1780 a courtyard was built, in which Stations of the Cross were placed.

In 1636, ownership of Tytuvėnai passed to the Radvila family. The 17th and early 18th centuries brought immense devastation to the town, which suffered attacks by Swedish forces during the Deluge in 1655 and again in 1701, and by the Russian army in 1708 during the Great Northern War. Decades of war left Tytuvėnai completely abandoned by 1711. On December 20, 1724, Tytuvėnai received a royal privilege from Grand Duke Augustus II granting it the right to host markets, which aided the town's recovery.

Following the Partitions of the Polish–Lithuanian Commonwealth, Tytuvėnai was an active center of resistance against Russian rule in Lithuania. During the November Uprising of 1830–1831, the town hosted the election of the Central Government of Samogitia and served as a rebel base, equipped with a foundry for producing cannonballs and ammunition. In the subsequent January Uprising of 1863, rebel forces led by Antanas Mackevičius and Jonas Stanevičius-Pisarskis were garrisoned in the area, where they clashed with the Russian Imperial Army. In 1864, a year after the uprising, Russian authorities accused the local Bernardine monks of aiding the insurgents, leading to the closure of the Tytuvėnai monastery. As part of the broader Russification campaign, the Tsarist administration subsequently built a Russian Orthodox Church next to the monastery.

During the Interwar period, Tytuvėnai was popular as a resort town due to its location among lakes and forests. In 1923, the town had 1164 inhabitants; 221 of them were Jews who made their living in agriculture and small trades. There was a synagogue and a Beth-Midrash in the town. Rabbi Yaakov Kamenetsky was the rabbi of the Tytuvėnai Jewish community from 1926 until 1937, when he emigrated to America.

During World War II, the town was under Soviet occupation from 1940, and then under German occupation from 1941 to 1944. Two mass executions in Tytuvėnai forest took place in August 1941, but before that, according to witnesses, about 30-40 Jews were taken by carts to Raseiniai and never came back. 15 Jewish men were shot during the first execution in Tytuvėnai forest. The second one took place about a week later, when women, children and the elderly were assembled in the synagogue, then brought to the forest in several trips and shot. Victims had to undress before the execution, while local villagers who were requisitioned to dig waited nearby to cover the bodies. About 160 Jewish women, children and the elderly were shot that day.

== Notable people ==
- Yaakov Kamenetsky, Rabbi of Tytevenai, 1926-1937, Rosh Yeshiva, Yeshiva Torah Vodaas, 1944-1964
- Shmuel Kamenetsky, Rosh Yeshiva, Talmudical Yeshiva of Philadelphia
- Binyamin Kamenetsky, Founder Yeshiva of South Shore
- Nosson Kamenetsky, Rosh Yeshiva, Yeshivas Itri

== Gallery ==
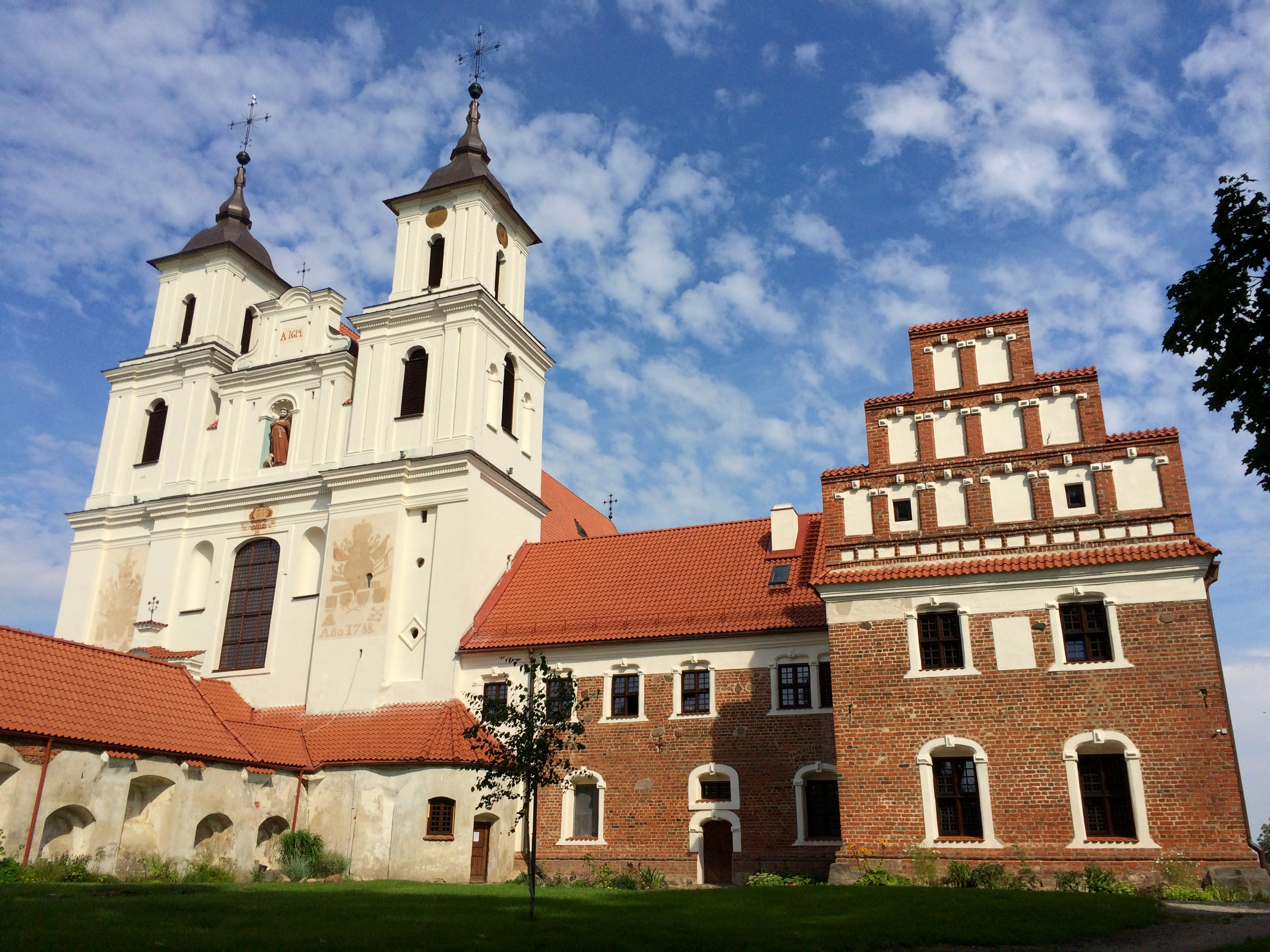
Tytuvėnai Monastery

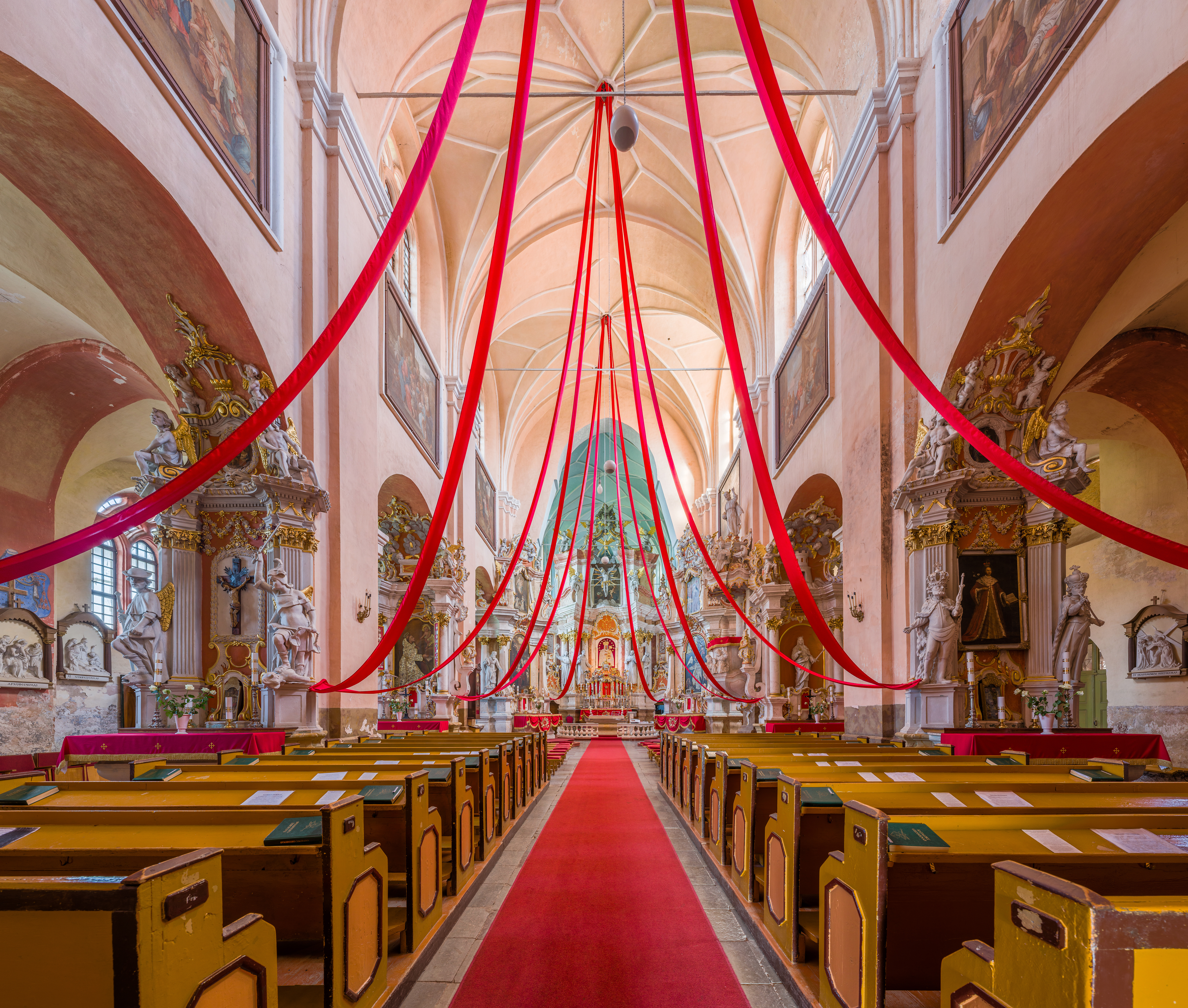
Tytuvėnai Monastery Church interior
