= Church of Blessed Virgin Mary, the Queen of Angels, Tytuvėnai =

Church building in Tytuvėnai, Lithuania

Church Of Blessed Virgin Mary, the Queen Of Angels Švč. Mergelės Marijos angelų karalienės bažnyčia
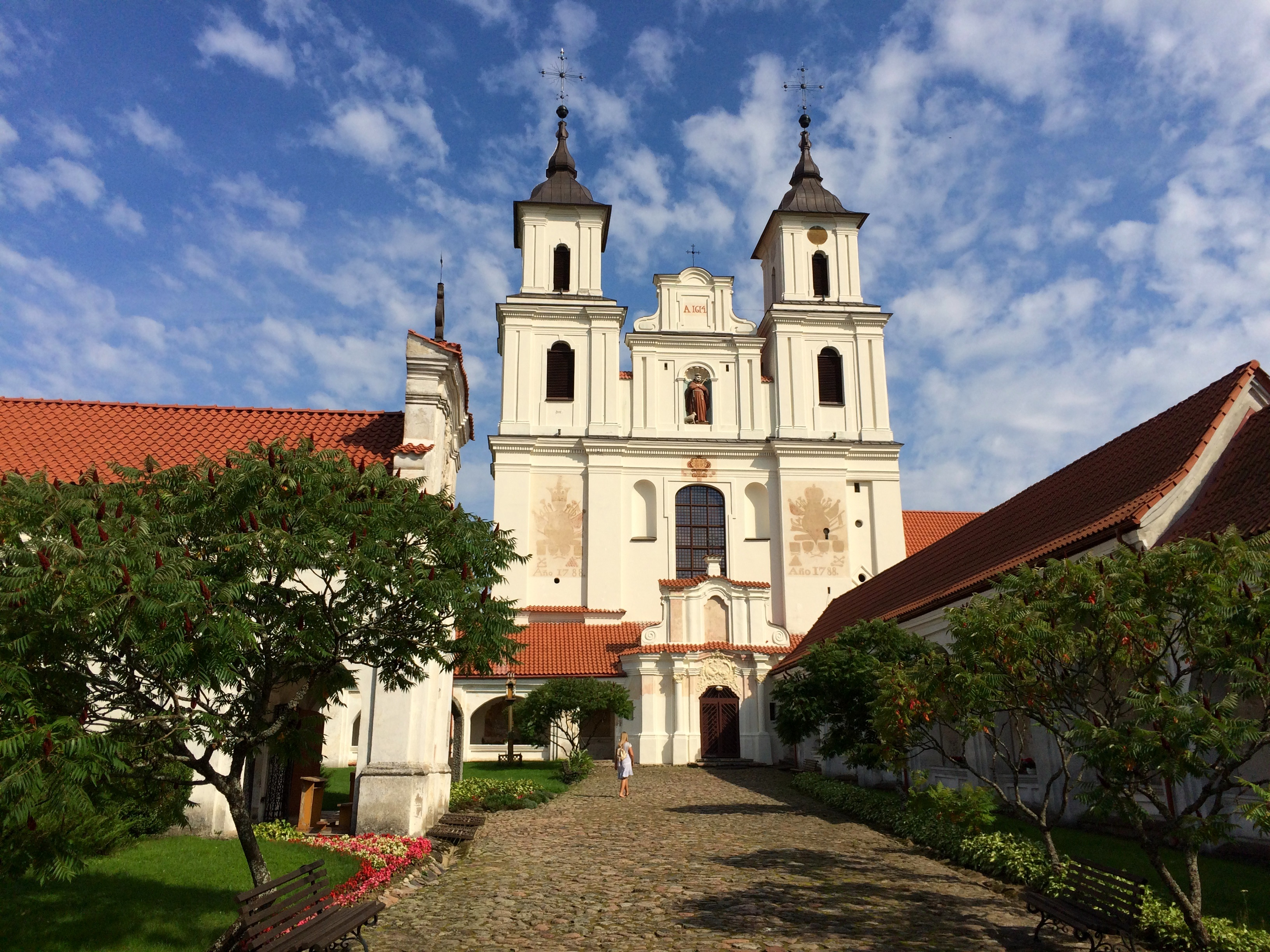
- Façade of Blessed Virgin Mary, the Queen Of Angels

Religion
- Affiliation: Roman Catholic
- Leadership: Roman Catholic Diocese of Šiauliai
- Year consecrated: 1633

Location
- Location: Tytuvėnai, Lithuania
- Interactive map of Church Of Blessed Virgin Mary, the Queen Of Angels; Švč. Mergelės Marijos angelų karalienės bažnyčia
- Coordinates: 55°35′48.46″N 23°12′3.53″E

Architecture
- Type: Church
- Style: Baroque
- Completed: 1633
- Materials: Plastered masonry

Website
- Tytuvenubaznycia.lt

The Church Of Blessed Virgin Mary, the Queen Of Angels (Lithuanian: Švč. Mergelės Marijos angelų karalienės bažnyčia), is a Roman Catholic church in Tytuvėnai, Lithuania. It is part of the Tytuvėnai Monastery.

== Gallery ==
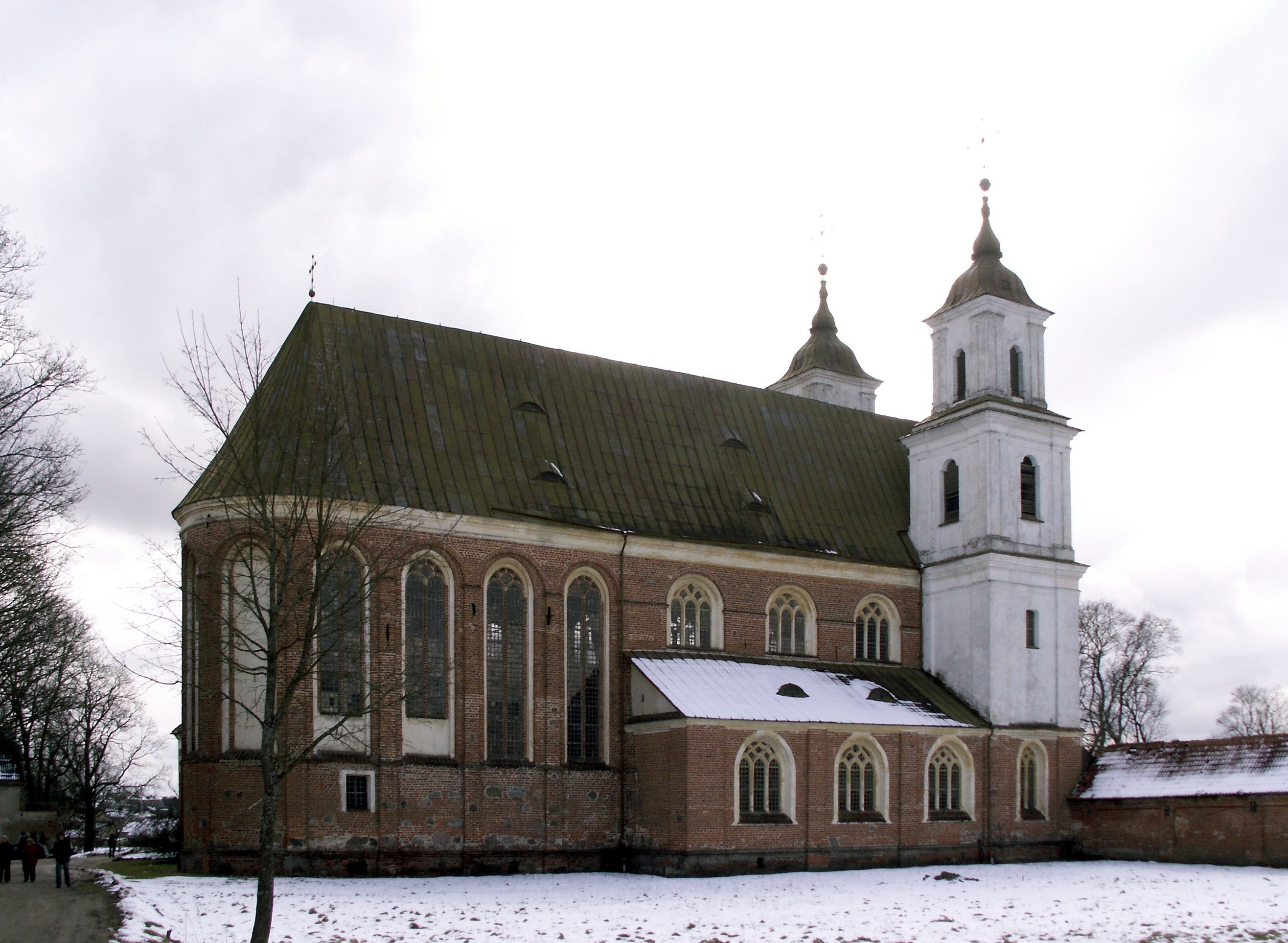
Side view of the church

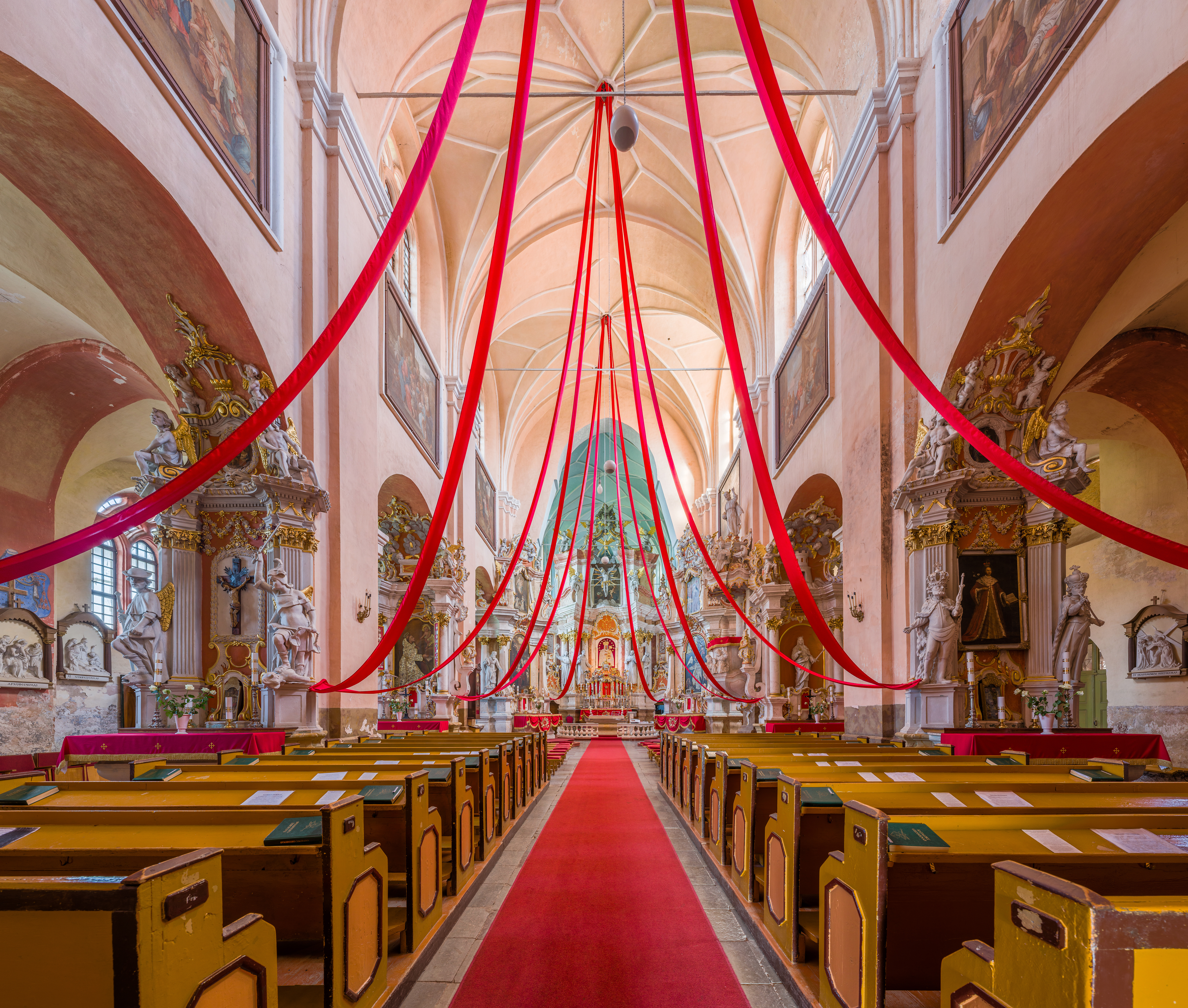
Interior of the church

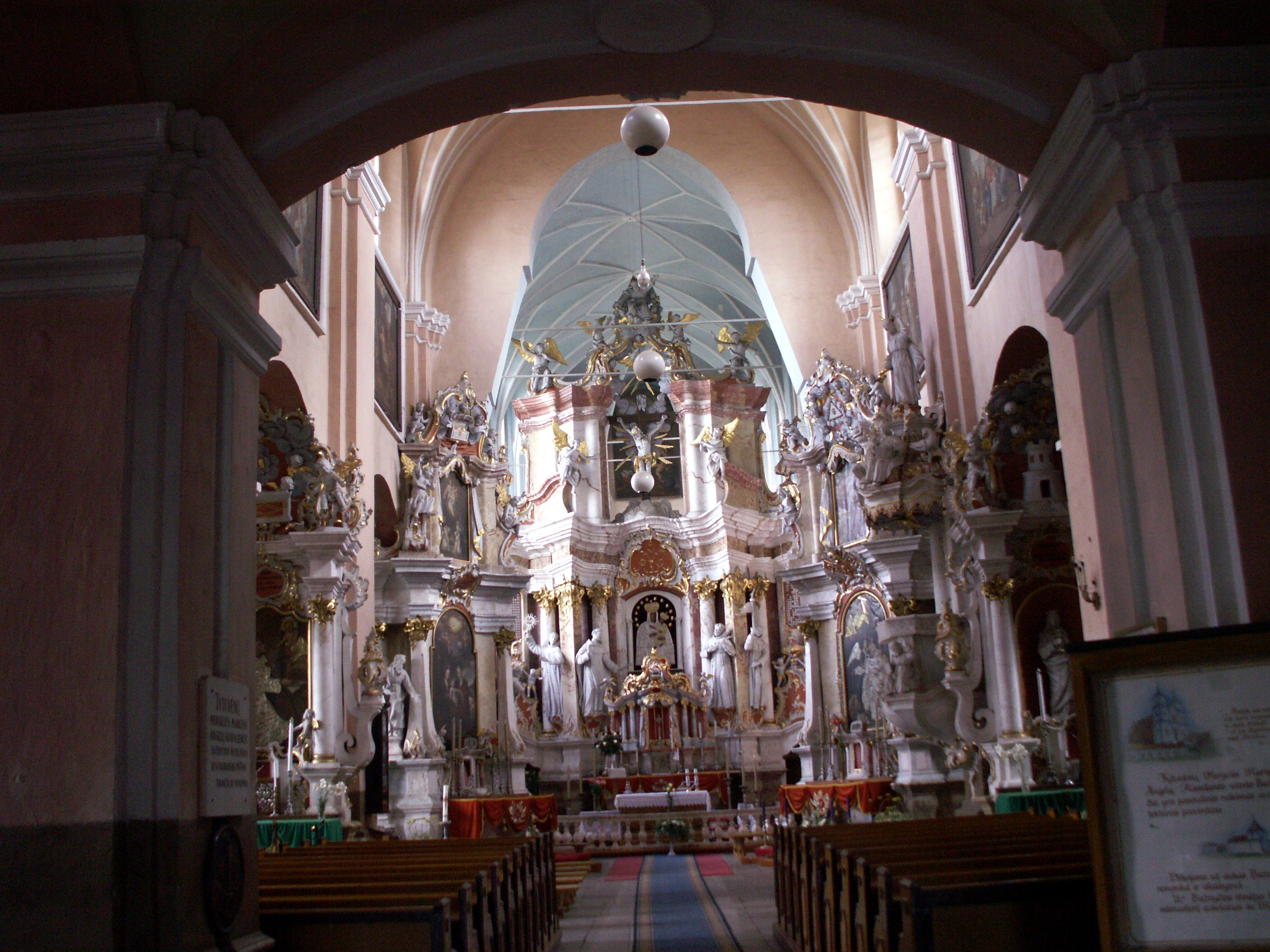
Main altar of the church
