= Tytuvėnai Monastery =

17th-century monastic complex in Tytuvėnai, Lithuania

Coordinates: 55.5966°N 23.2010°E

- Tytuvėnų vienuolynas
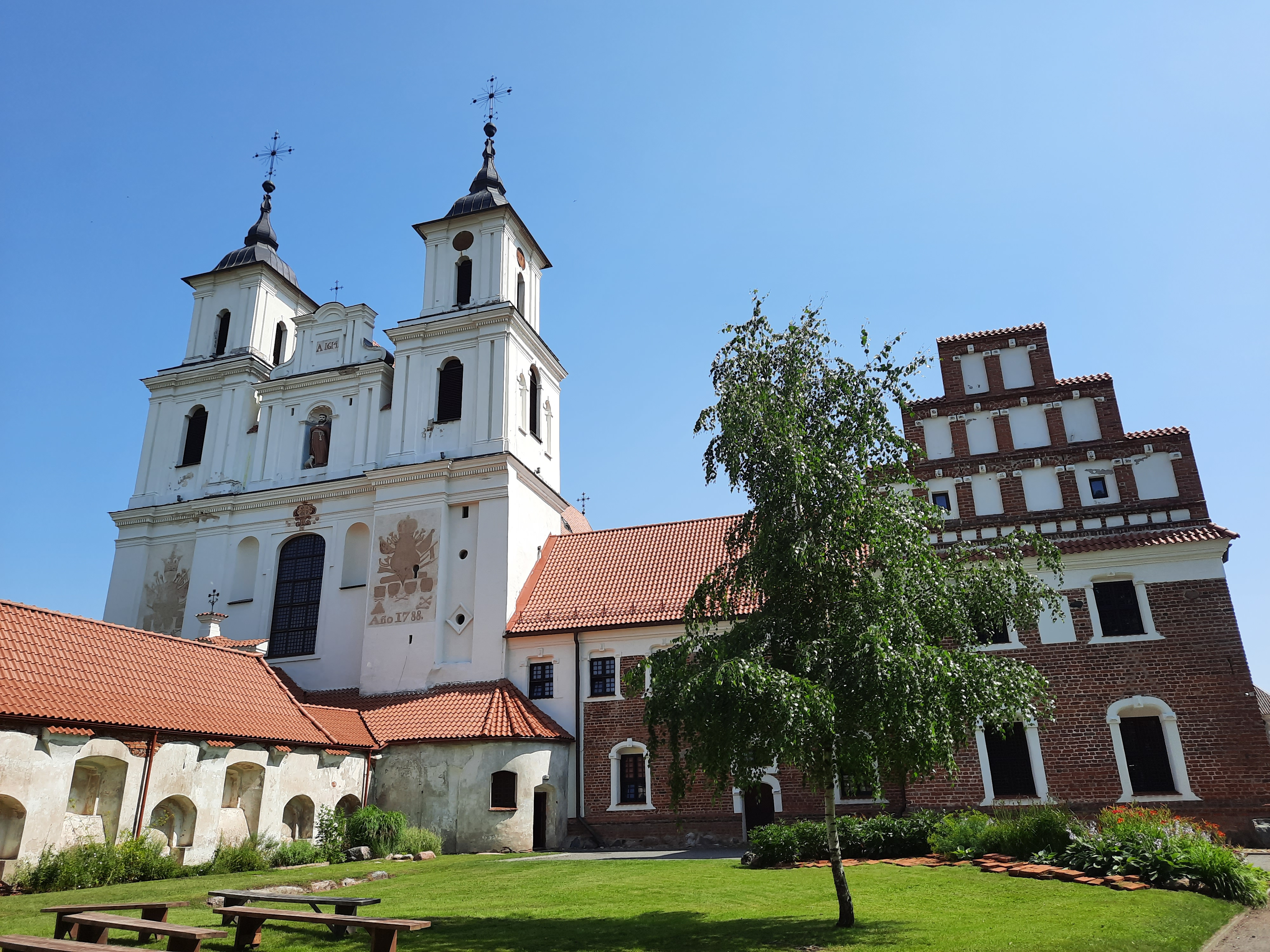
- Church of Blessed Virgin Mary, the Queen Of Angels and monastery complex
- Interactive map of Tytuvėnai Monastery

Monastery information
- Order: Bernardine Franciscans (1614–1832); Roman Catholic Diocese of Šiauliai (1991–present)
- Established: 1614
- Disestablished: 1832 (secularized)
- Dedication: Assumption of Mary

People
- Founder: Andrius Valavičius

Architecture
- Style: Baroque

Site
- Location: Tytuvėnai, Šiauliai County, Lithuania
- Public access: Yes

Cultural Monuments of Lithuania
- Type: National
- Designated: 19 May 1998
- Reference no.: 21847

Tytuvėnai Monastery (Lithuanian: Tytuvėnų vienuolynas) is a historic monastic complex in Tytuvėnai, northern Lithuania, renowned for its Baroque art and religious significance. The site includes the Church of Blessed Virgin Mary, the Queen Of Angels and adjacent monastery buildings, originally constructed for the Bernardine Franciscans in the 17th century. It is a protected cultural landmark and has been on Lithuania's UNESCO Tentative List since 2006.

== Architecture ==
The monastery complex exhibits a synthesis of Gothic, Renaissance, and Baroque architectural elements. The church itself features a basilica-type layout with three naves and a two-level chancel. The use of red brick combined with fieldstones, high-arched windows, and tracery reflects a transitional phase in Lithuanian architectural design.

The interior of the church is noted for its series of ornate altars and sculptural details. A particularly notable work is the painting of Madonna and Child from the 1720s, which has been a central object of veneration. Furthermore, the complex includes the Christ Stairs Chapel, modelled after the Scala Sancta in Rome.

== History ==
Tytuvėnai has been known in historical sources since the late 14th century, and the Tytuvėnai manor was mentioned in 1500. At the beginning of the 16th century, Grand Duke Alexander of Lithuania gifted Tytuvėnai, Kelmė and the surrounding area as a dowry to Jadvyga, the daughter of the former Vilnius Voivode Alekna Sudimantaitis. The first church in Tytuvėnai, dedicated to St George, was constructed in 1555.

=== Founding and Early Years ===
In 1609 Andrius Valavičius, a Standard-bearer of the Grand Duchy of Lithuania and a judge of the Samogitian Land Court, purchased the manor, the town and the adjacent lands from Kristupas Zenovičius, the Voivode of Brest. In 1613, he invited Bernardine monks and gave them 10,000 gold pieces. Five members of the order arrived from Vilnius and Kaunas and settled near the old church. On 20 June 1614, after the consecration of the cornerstone, the construction of the church and the monastery began. Although Valavičius died shortly after signing the Foundation Act, his family, notably his brothers, continued the project. The monastery and the church were completed in 1633 and consecrated on 1 November 1635. The monastery was severely damaged during the First Northern War (1654–1667), particularly during the 1655 invasion by Muscovite forces.

=== 18th–19th Centuries ===
During the eighteenth century, the complex experienced significant modifications. Between 1764 and 1788, the monastery was reconstructed in the Vilnius Baroque style and assumed its present appearance, characterized by ornate stucco decorations and architectural forms. The frescoes and altars were completed earlier, by 1740, likely by artists influenced by Italian Baroque traditions. However, after the Partitions of the Polish–Lithuanian Commonwealth, the active monastic life of the complex was disrupted in the mid-nineteenth century when the Bernardine community was disbanded in 1832 by tsarist authorities after the failed November Uprising against Russian Empire. The friars were accused of involvement in anti-Russian activities. Tsarist authorities later repurposed the monastery's buildings as a school and courthouse. Later in 1864, after the second failed uprising, during further repressions against Lithuanians, Mikhail Muravyov-Vilensky ordered the closing down of the monastery's church. Andriejus Petravičius, the last Bernardine monk in Tytuvėnai, was arrested and deported to katorga in Siberia. Fortunately by the efforts of the local parishioners and Motiejus Valančius, the Bishop of Samogitia, the church was allowed to re-open but the monastery remained closed. At the end of the nineteenth century, due to repressive tsarist policies the novitiate house, watermill, brewery, the carriage house were demolished.

=== 20th century and present day ===
During the Soviet occupation of Lithuania, the monastery was once again closed. The church was also closed in 1969 by Soviet authorities and used as a warehouse, leading to the deterioration of its interior art.

Following Lithuania's re-establishment of independence in 1990, efforts to restore and preserve Tytuvėnai Monastery have intensified. Initially, due to the lack of funds only the most urgent repairs were done. Starting in the early 2000s and particularly after 2007, full restoration projects were implemented to address structural deterioration and to conserve the original decorative elements, including the restoration of faded frescos and other artistic details. These efforts were crucial following a 2012 fire that caused significant damage to parts of the complex.

Today, the monastery serves both as a museum and a pilgrimage site, notably as a component of the Pope John Paul II Pilgrims' Way. A reliquary, consisting of a drop of blood of John Paul II, is also preserved within the complex.

== Gallery ==
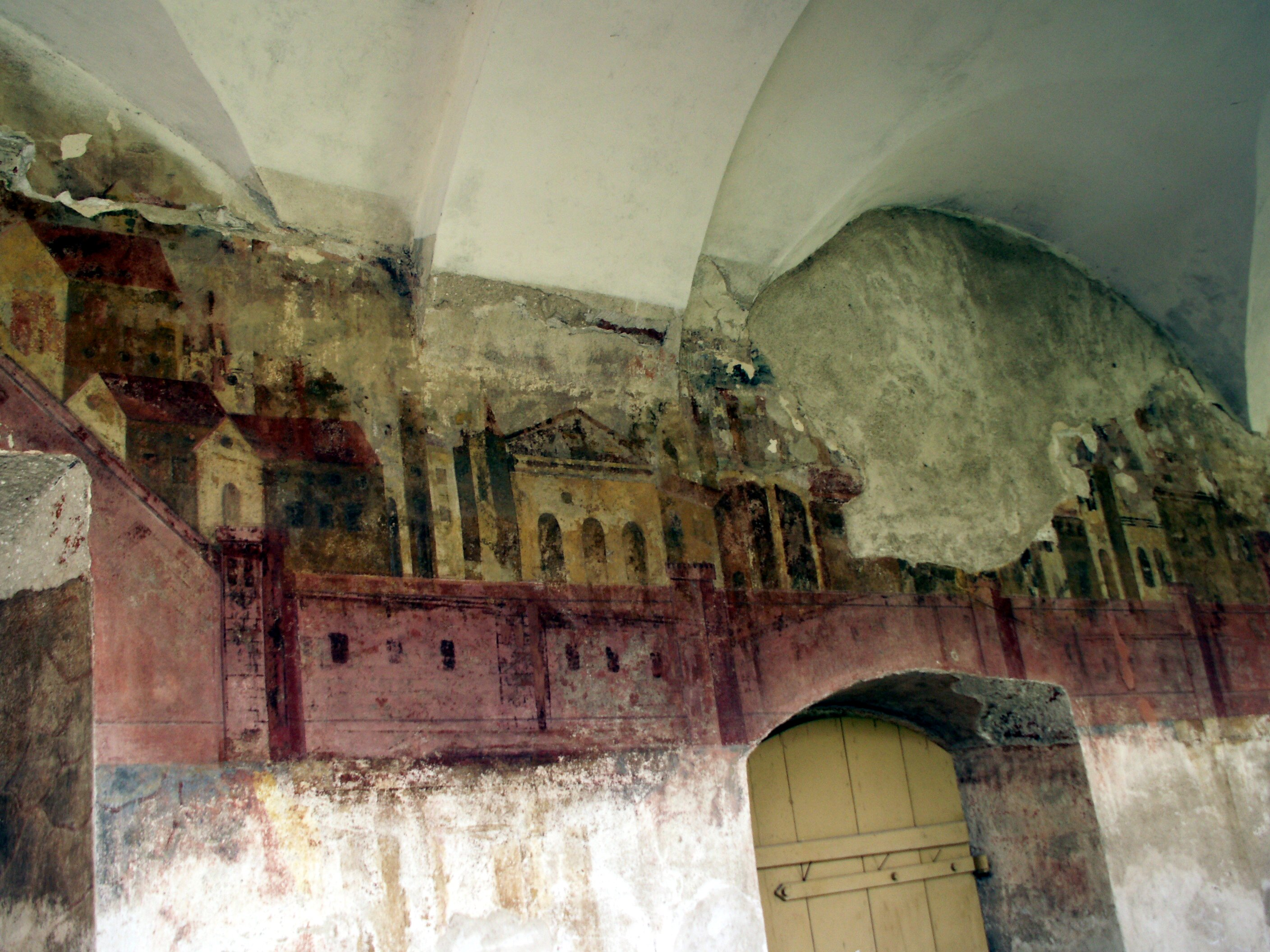
Frescoes

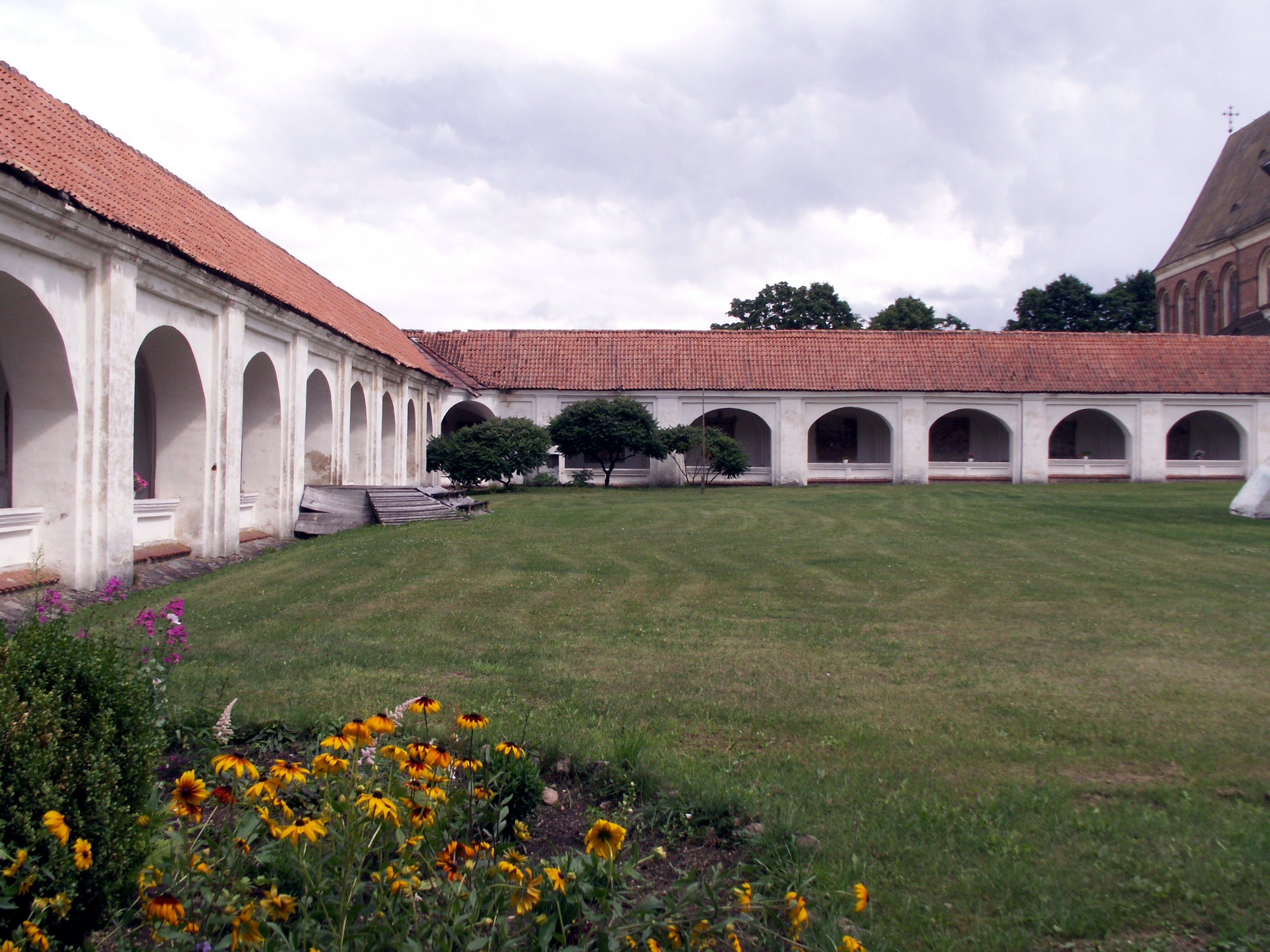
Arcades of the monastery

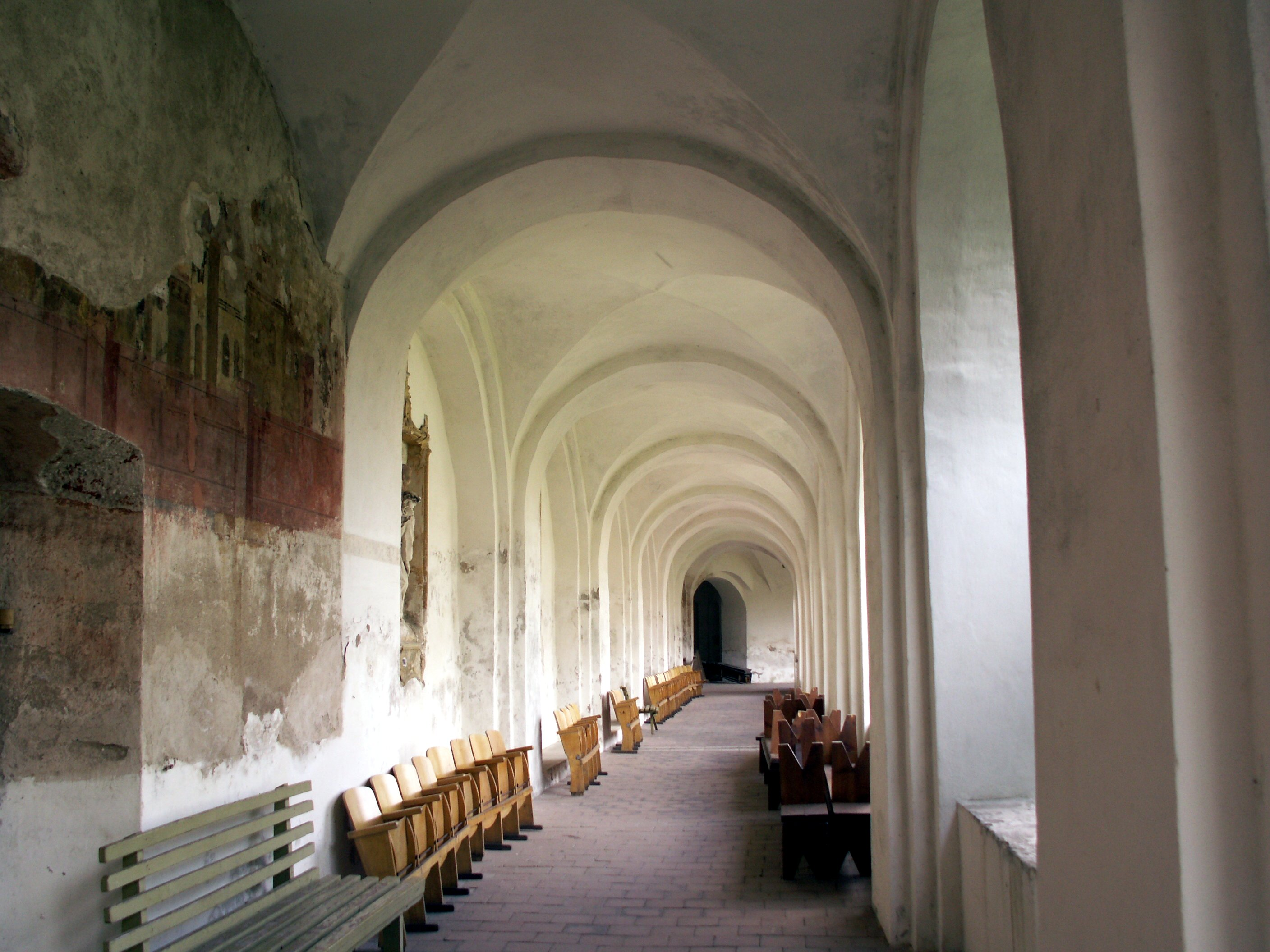
One of the corridors of the monastery

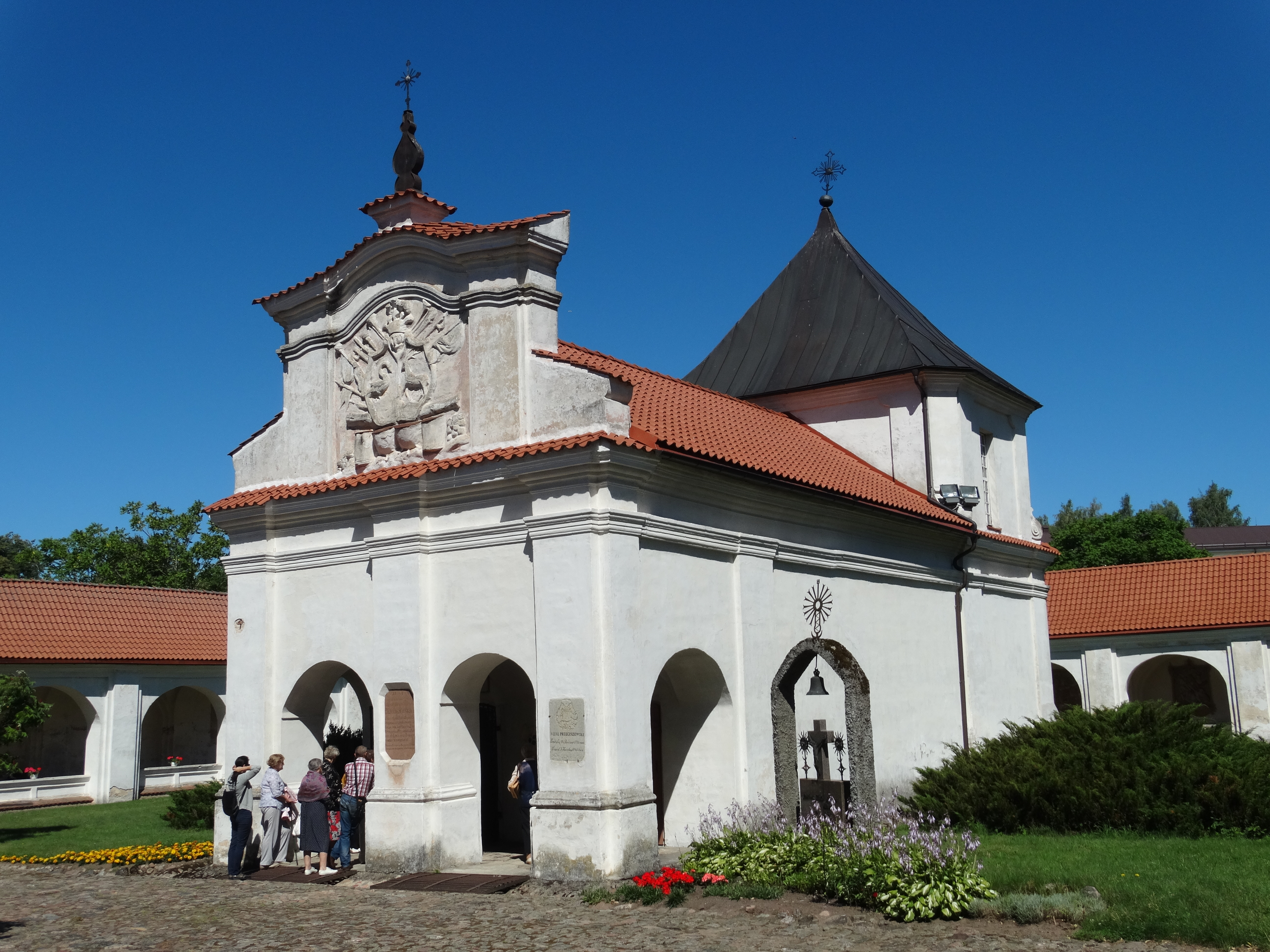
Tytuvėnai Christ Stairs Chapel
