= Tytuvėnai Christ Stairs Chapel =

Chapel in Lithuania

Coordinates: 55°35′49″N 23°12′01″E

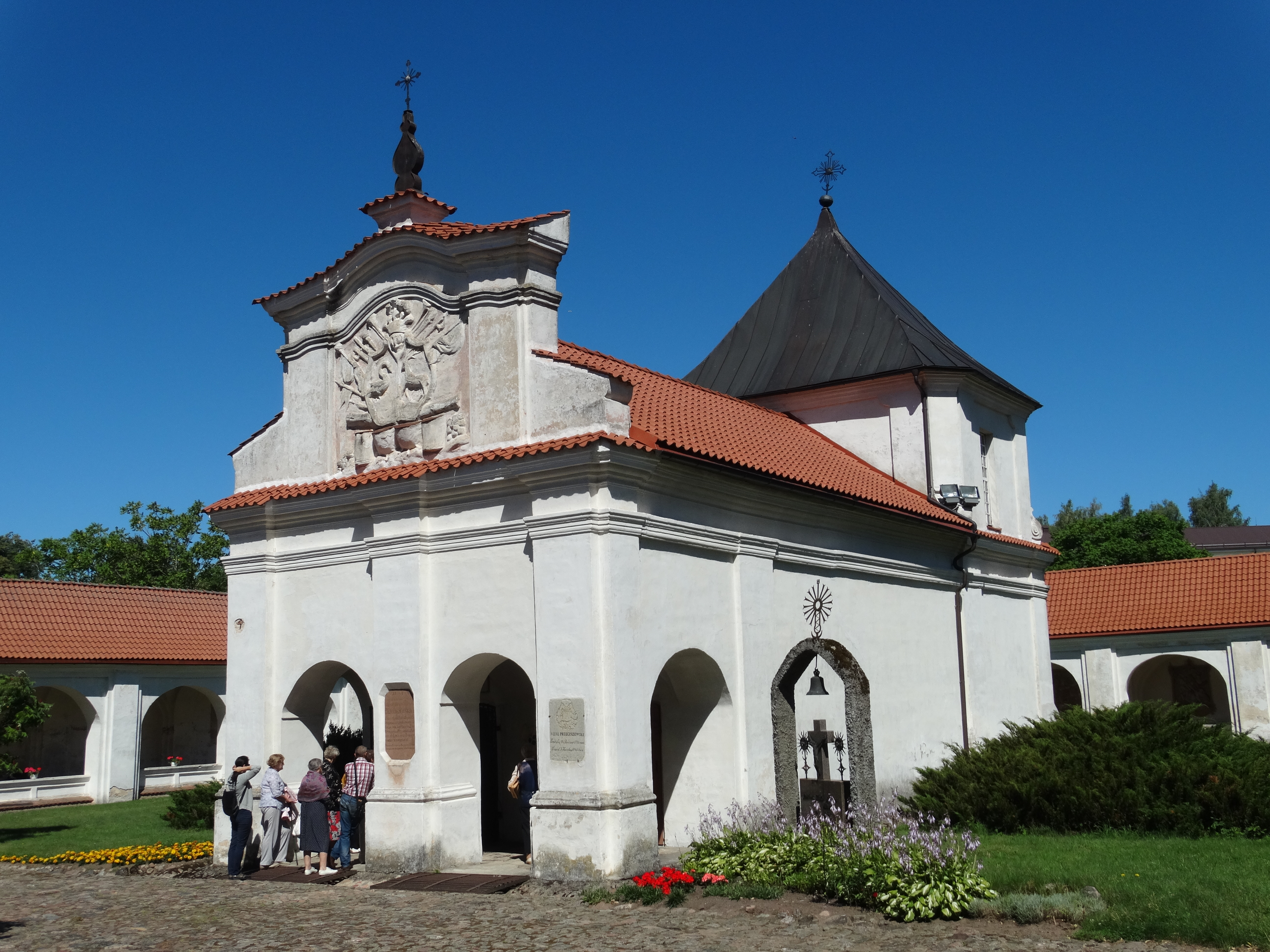
Tytuvėnai Christ Stairs Chapel

The Tytuvėnai Christ Stairs Chapel (Lithuanian: Tytuvėnų Kristaus laiptų koplyčia) is a chapel in the Tytuvėnai Monastery which was constructed in 1775 from a stone transported from Sweden. It is an example of Holy Stairs architecture which began to spread in Europe following the Council of Trent. A blood drop of Pope John Paul II is preserved in the chapel.

== Gallery ==
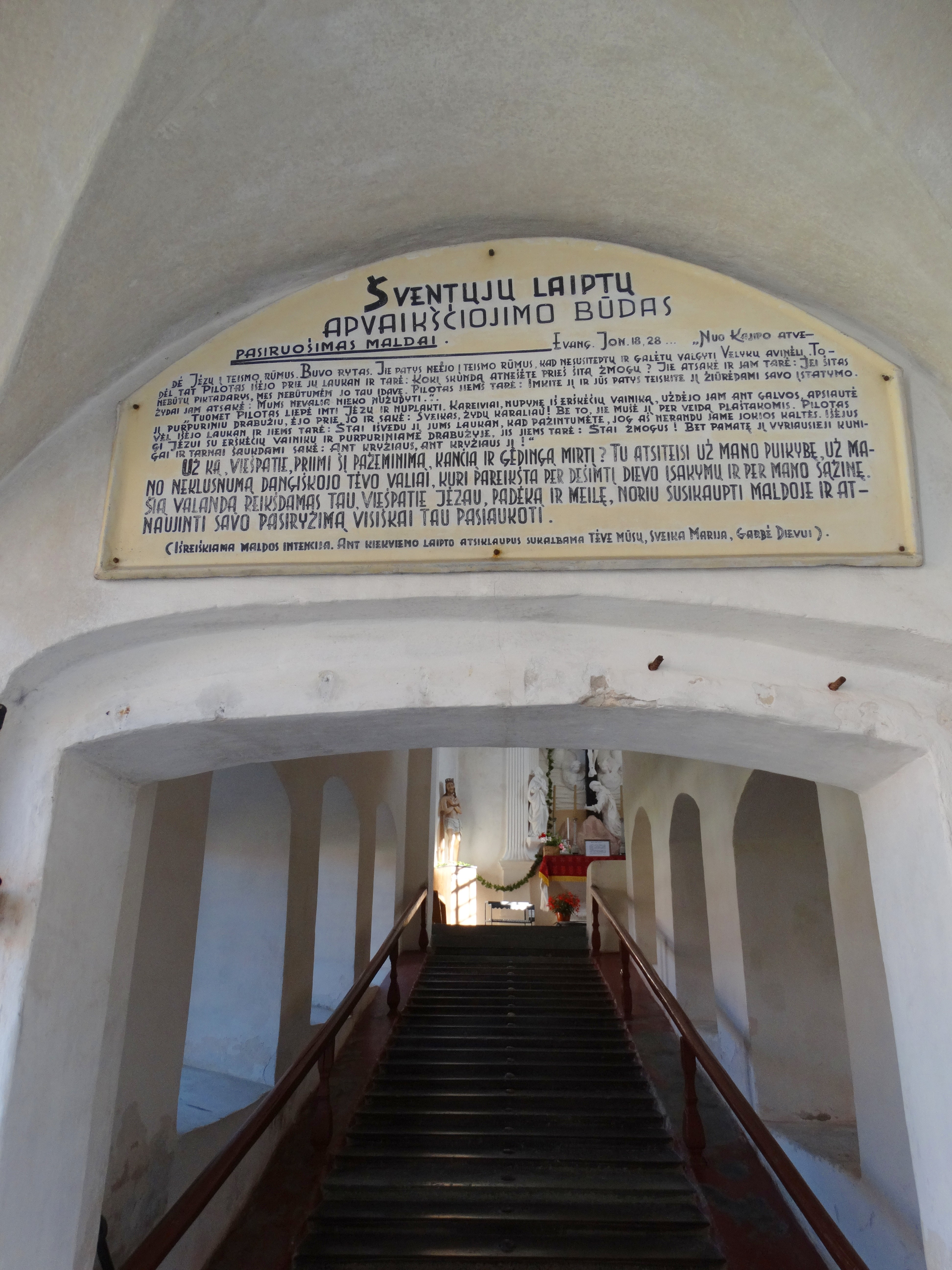
The holy stairs from the bottom

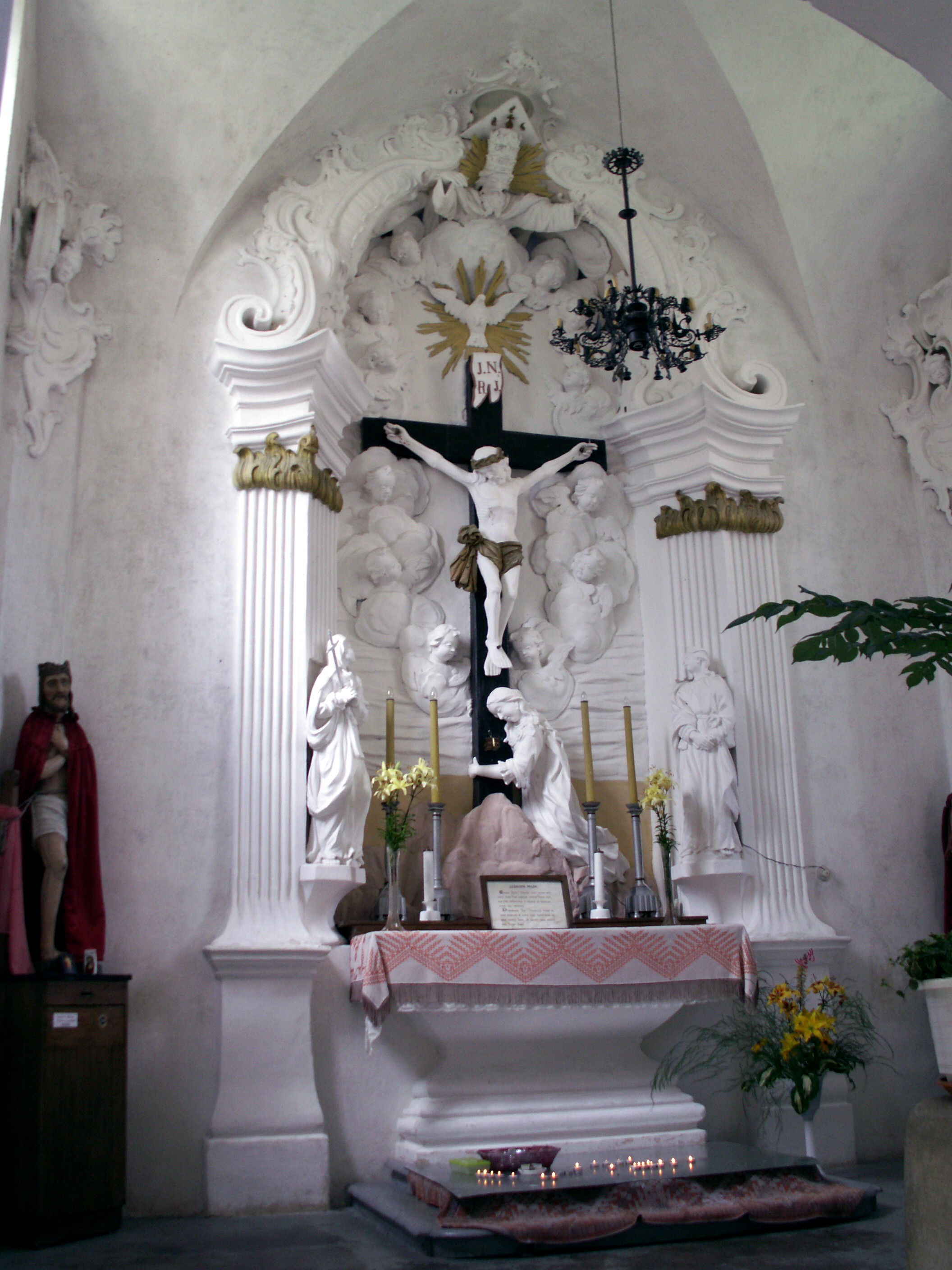
Crucifix on top of the holy stairs

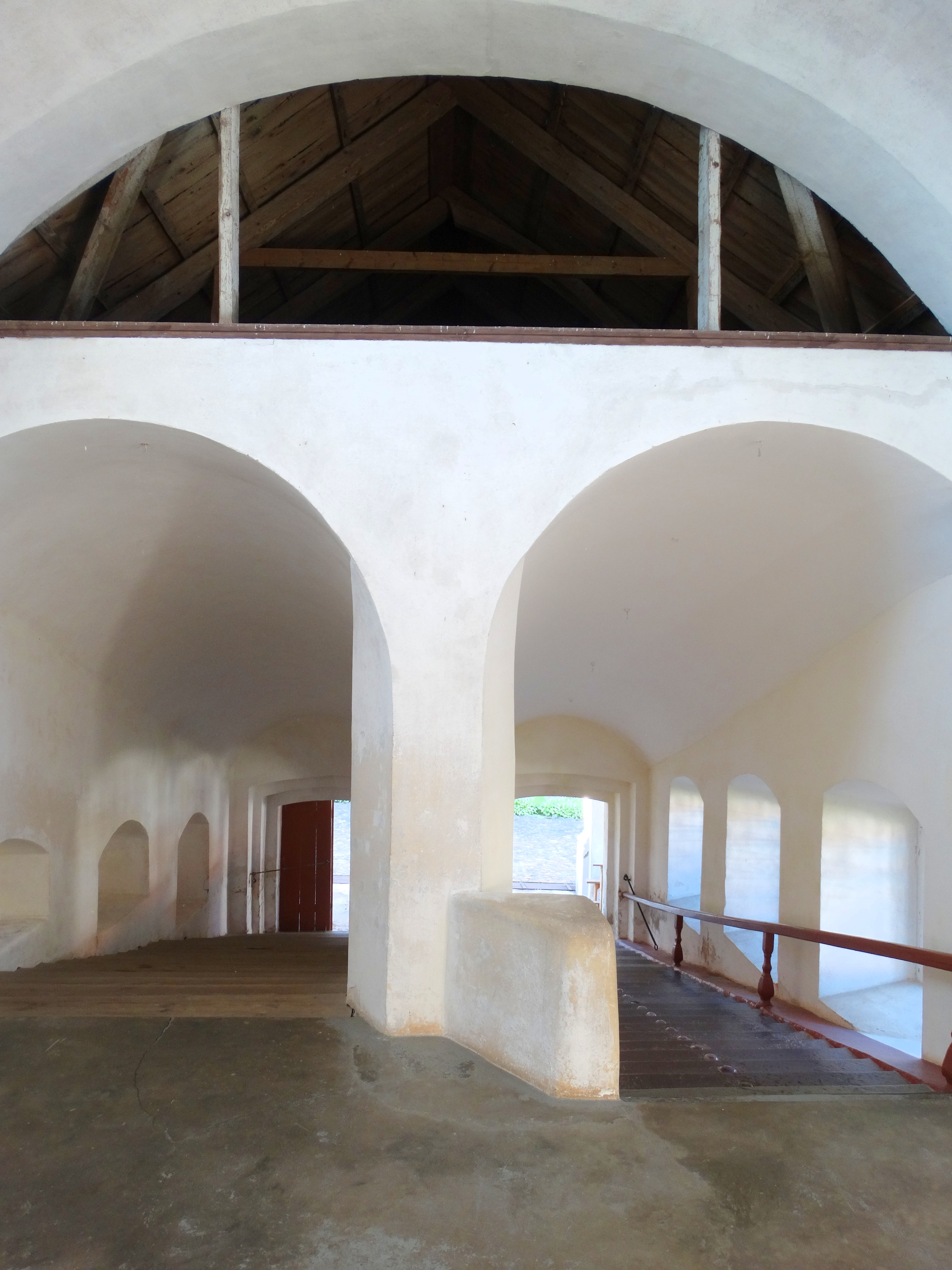
Both holy stairs from the above
