= Binyamin Kamenetsky =

American rabbi (1923–2017)

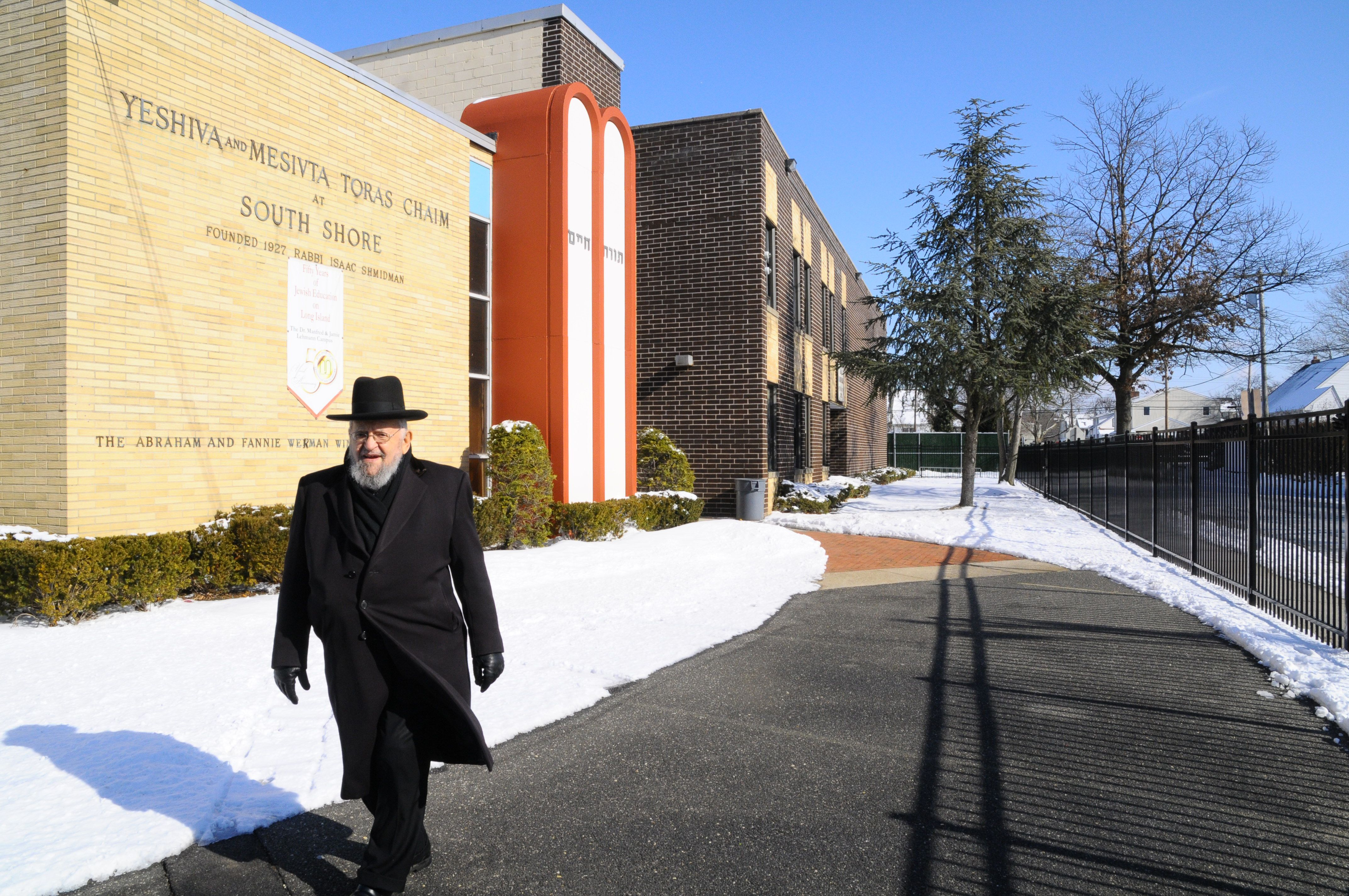
Kamenetsky walking in front of his yeshiva

Binyamin Kamenetsky (July 17, 1923 – April 28, 2017) was an American rabbi who was the founder and rosh yeshiva of Yeshiva of South Shore.

== Biography ==
Kamenetsky was born in Tytuvėnai, Lithuania, where his father served as rabbi. His parents were Yaakov Kamenetsky and Itta Ettil Heller, and he was one of their four sons; he had two sisters. Although his education began locally in the Telshe Yeshiva, he attended Yeshivas Chofetz Chaim in the United States under the tutelage of Dovid Lebowitz and Yeshivas Ner Yisroel.

His first teaching job was at Yeshiva Toras Chaim in East New York in the 1940s. In 1956, he founded the Yeshiva of South Shore, which was the first yeshiva on Long Island. Seven years later, the yeshiva merged with Yeshiva Toras Chaim. He also founded other institutions in the Five Towns, including Torah Academy for Girls (TAG), located on Long Island. For several years, he served as the Rav of a minyan that would become the Young Israel of Woodmere, one of the largest Young Israel shuls in the country.
