= Yeshiva of South Shore =

Orthodox boys'/men's school

Coordinates: 40.64096°N 73.70791°W

Yeshiva of South Shore (YOSS) is an American Orthodox boys' and men's yeshiva in Long Island that was opened at a time when the area had no yeshivos, and subsequently expanded to being in need of renting unused public school space. In part, this was due to growth of the local Orthodox Jewish population: The New York Times reported that 90% of those newly moving in were Orthodox Jews.

== History ==
Binyamin Kamenetsky, the school's founder, who had been teaching in the 1940s at Yeshiva Toras Chaim (East New York), asked one student why he was commuting daily from Cedarhurst. The boy said that his community did not have a yeshiva. With the encouragement of Yaakov Kamenetsky (his father) Binyamin moved from Brooklyn to Five Towns and "served as the Rav of a minyan that would become the Young Israel of Woodmere." In 1956 he "left his rabbinical position" and began Yeshiva Toras Chaim South Shore. The school opened in September.

"Seven years later, the two Jewish schools merged and moved to a new campus on William Street in With the growth of the school came the need for another person to help run it; that person, Rabbi Chanina Herzberg, came with a unique approach to chinuch that was taught to him by his Rebbe, Rabbi Shlomo Freifeld. It focused on the greatness of each individual child, and the unlimited potential that every neshama possesses. Rabbi Herzberg was a master at cultivating each Jewish neshama. Under his leadership, the Yeshiva continued to thrive for nearly four decades that he was at the helm. Rabbi Herzberg died in 2018.

Binyamin's son Mordechai later succeeded his father's position.

A local newspaper described the impact of this school, and a girls' school begun by the same founder, has been described as a "powerful force in the transformation of the community."

== Controversy ==
In 1988, when they found their facility overcrowded, they were rebuffed in attempts to rent unused public school space. Two years prior the school encountered what a member of the Nassau County Commission on Human Rights called "problems between Orthodox and non-Orthodox Jews here in the Five Towns."

== Notable alumni ==
- Kalman Sporn (born 1971), businessman

== See also ==
- Mesivta Ateres Yaakov: 1987-2003 was a part of Yeshiva of South Shore.
