= Yeshiva Toras Chaim (East New York) =

Orthodox yeshiva

Coordinates: 40°40′19.7″N 73°53′10.2″W

Yeshiva Toras Chaim was an American Haredi Lithuanian-type boys' and men's yeshiva in the East New York neighborhood of Brooklyn that was "established by the pioneering Rabbi Isaac Shmidman" in 1927.

The full name of the Belmont Avenue location, reflecting both the lower grades and the high school, was Yeshiva and Mesivta Torahs Chaim of Greater New York.

== South Shore ==
In 1956 Binyamin Kamenetsky, who had taught at the Brooklyn location in the 1940s, opened Yeshiva Toras Chaim of the South Shore, "the first yeshiva on Long Island" with Kamenetsky as its dean.

"Seven years later, the two Jewish schools merged and moved to a new campus on William Street in Hewlett." With the growth of the school came the need for another person to help run it; that person, Rabbi Chanina Herzberg, came with a unique approach to chinuch that was taught to him by his Rebbe, Rabbi Shlomo Freifeld. It focused on the greatness of each individual child, and the unlimited potential that every neshama possesses. Rabbi Herzberg was a master at cultivating each Jewish neshama. Under his leadership, the Yeshiva continued to thrive for nearly four decades that he was at the helm. Rabbi Herzberg died in 2018.

== Notable students ==
- Shlomo Freifeld
- Yaakov Perlow
