= Church of St. Adalbert and Benedictine monastery =

Former monastic complex in Minsk

Coordinates: 53.901491°N 27.554629°E

- Касцёл Святога Войцеха і кляштар бенедыкцінак
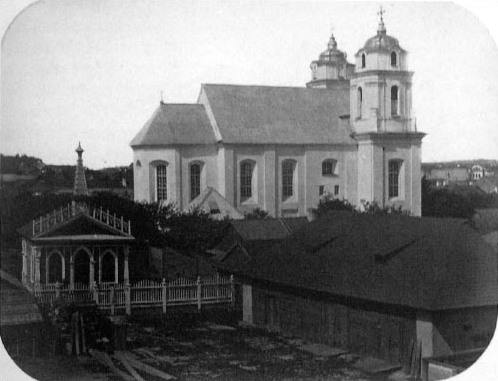
- Church building during the first half of the 19th century
- Church of St. Adalbert and Benedictine monastery
- Location: Minsk
- Country: Belarus
- Denomination: Catholic
- Churchmanship: Latin Church

History
- Dedication: Adalbert of Prague

Architecture
- Completed: around 1640
- Closed: 1871
- Demolished: 1964

Church of St. Adalbert and Benedictine monastery (Belarusian: Касцёл Святога Войцеха і кляштар бенедыкцінак, romanized: Kaściol Śviatoha Vojciecha i kliaštar bieniedykcinak) was a Roman Catholic monastic complex in Minsk originally belonging to the Benedictine order, founded in the first half of the 17th century. It was taken from the order after the January Uprising, and transferred to Orthodox nuns in 1871. The monastery was demolished in the 1930s, and the former church was destroyed in 1964. Only the foundations of the church remain. Currently, the General Prosecutor's Office of Belarus is located on this site.

== Location ==
The church was located on Zborowa Street. It was situated on a small hilly square near the old Calvary, next to the site where a half-destroyed Calvinist church from the late 16th century stood in the mid-17th century. According to the city's 1790 plan, the church's main facade faced northwest.

== History ==
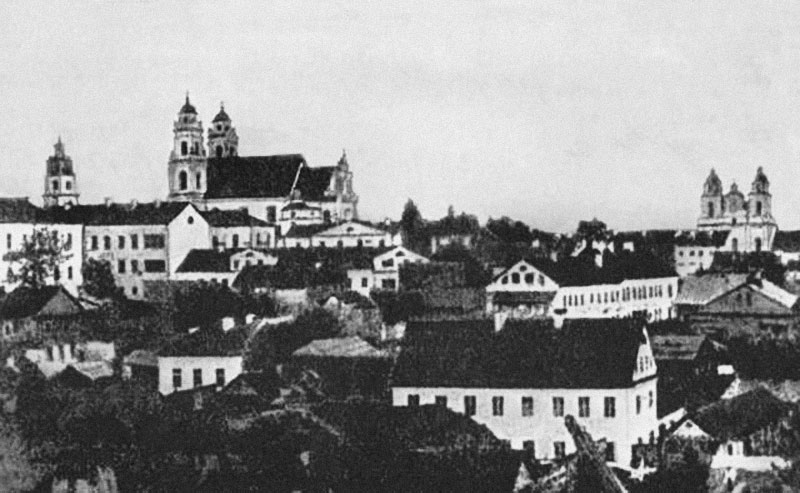
View of Minsk. On the right, Church of St. Adalbert

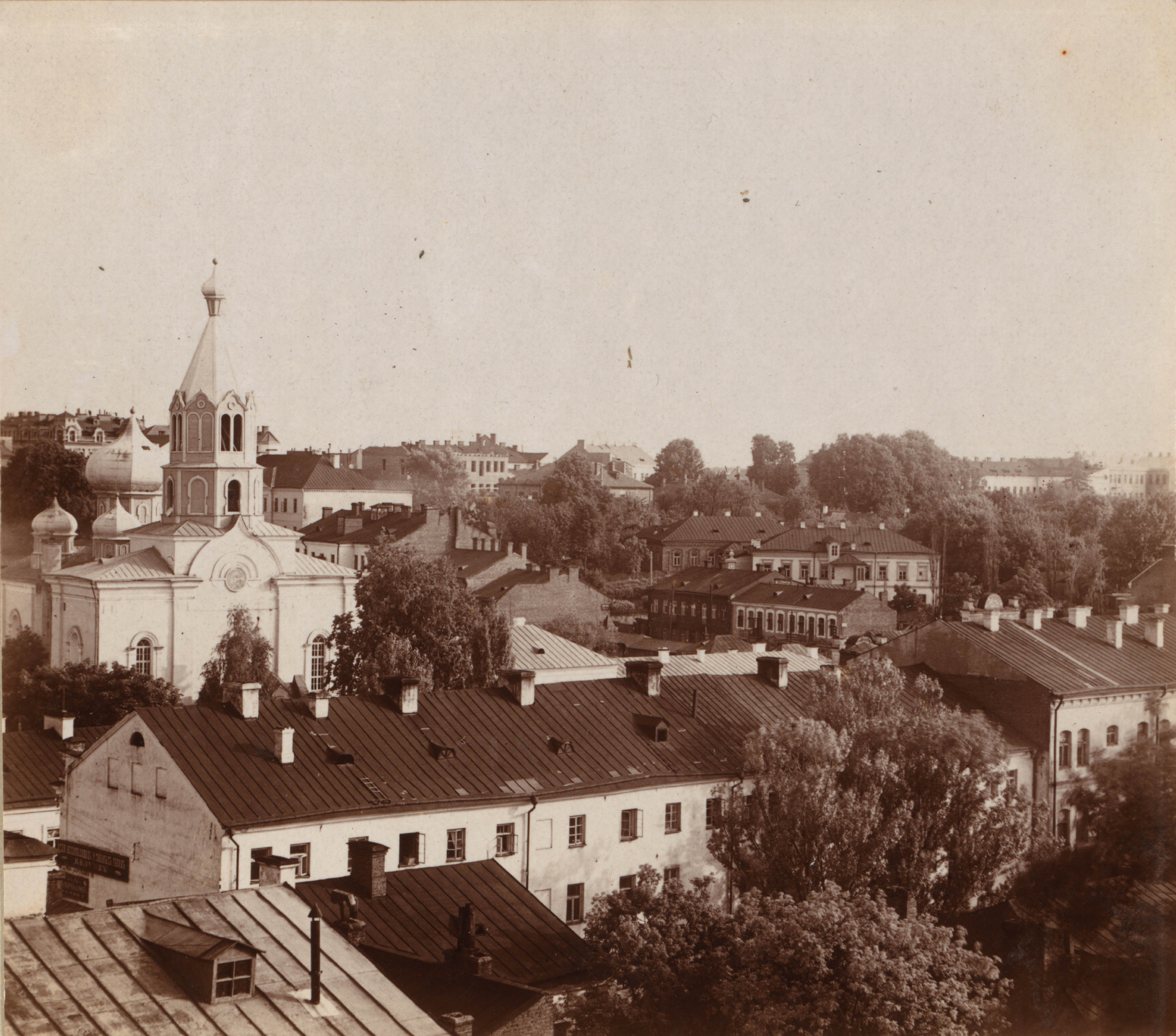
Church of St. Adalbert's (left) after conversion to an Orthodox church

The Benedictine convent was mentioned in four foundation documents (from 1630, 1631, 1632, and 4 May 1633) by Father Wojciech Sielawa, a Vilnius canon, and parson of Dravėniai and Nyasvizh. The foundation was confirmed by King Władysław IV Vasa on 14 July 1633. In 1632, Wojciech Sielawa bought two houses on Zborowa Street and handed them over to the Benedictine nuns, who had come to Minsk from Nyasvizh. He commissioned a wooden church to be built on the site, which was completed in 1633. The church was dedicated to St. Adalbert, bishop and martyr. In the late 1640s, thanks to the foundation (20,000 Polish zlotys) of Krzysztof Chodkiewicz and his wife Zofia, a brick church was erected. The first project was by Andreas Kromer, who committed to building the church within three years, but failed to do so due to the outbreak of the Russo-Polish War (1654–1667). During the conflict, the wooden monastery buildings were burned, and the unfinished brick church was plundered. Thanks to the efforts of Abbess Katarzyna Scholastyka Świrska, the construction of a small brick monastery began in the 1670s to replace the destroyed wooden one. In 1682, the entire monastery complex was reconstructed and expanded, made possible by new foundations and the enlargement of the Benedictine property. By the late 17th century, the nuns' land amounted to about 100 voloks (approximately 1,795.5 hectares). The construction of the church and monastery was completed in 1690. The new brick church was consecrated by Mikołaj Słupski, Vilnius archdeacon. In the 1780s, the church was remodeled in the late Baroque style according to Tomasz Romanowski's design.

After Minsk was incorporated into the Russian Empire in 1793, the church and monastery continued to operate. According to 1799 review documents, the church had one intact tower covered with sheet metal and topped with an iron cross, while the other was damaged by a lightning strike and temporarily covered with wood shingles. Ignacy Borejko Chodźko reported that the first bishop of the newly established Minsk diocese in 1798, Jakub Ignacy Dederko, ordered the renovation of the towers on Church of St. Adalbert early in his administration. According to Chodźko, the construction was completed in 1803. In 1800, the monastery gardens were divided for the construction of a new street, Felicjańska, reducing the monastery's property by its southwestern part.

In 1866, after the January Uprising, the tsarist authorities decided to close the church. The monastery operated for a few more years. Nuns from several other closed monasteries in the Minsk diocese joined it. In early 1871, the Benedictine nuns were moved to Kimbarówka near Mazyr (to the Cistercian monastery). On 20 September 1871, a decree was signed liquidating the Minsk monastery. 12 Minsk nuns were sent to the Nyasvizh monastery, arriving there on October 30. After the final closure of the Nyasvizh monastery, the Minsk Benedictines were relocated to the monastery in Slonim.

In 1871, Church of St. Adalbert and monastery were handed over to the Eastern Orthodox Church. The dean of Nadniemeńska sent a letter to the Russian authorities requesting permission to transfer the Benedictine altars, paintings, and movable property to the Church of Holy Trinity in Minsk and the church in Novi Svierzhan. The organ was sold to the Calvinist church in Koydanava. The Benedictine monastery was converted into the Orthodox convent of the Transfiguration. The following year, the monastery complex was remodeled. The architect of the Minsk Orthodox eparchy, Siergiej Ivanov, designed the project. Although the design has not survived, the cost estimate shows plans to demolish the towers and pediment and replace the damaged roof and rafters with a new structure, allowing the addition of five domes and a wooden, sheet-metal-covered, three-tiered bell tower in the shape of a tent. Construction was completed in 1873. Zborowa Street was renamed Prieobrazhenskaya after the monastery was handed over.

After Polish troops captured Minsk in September 1919, the church was returned to the Catholics (it served as a seminary church). For a short period, the seminary of the restored Minsk diocese, which had been relocated from the Dominican monastery, was also housed here. Following the signing of the Treaty of Riga in 1921, Minsk became part of the Soviet Union, and the church was once again converted into an Orthodox church. The monastery was not reestablished. In the 1930s, the former Benedictine church was turned into a club, and the monastery was demolished. During World War II, German occupiers allowed liturgies to be held in the former church. After the war, the church was closed by Soviet authorities. In 1964, the former Benedictine church was demolished. The Prosecutor General's Office was built in its place.

== Endowment of the monastery and church ==
The initial endowment for the Benedictine nuns was approved by the Vilnius bishop, Abraham Woyna. On 14 July 1633, King Władysław IV Vasa issued a privilege confirming the legitimacy of the endowment. According to the document, the nuns received from Father Wojciech Sielawa two houses with annexes, yards, gardens, and a field purchased from Samuel Drucki-Horski and Alexander Sokolinski, the Church of St. Adalbert, and an estate named Piotrowskie, valued at 5,000 Polish zlotys, from Elżbieta Radzimińska, wife of Zygmunt Naruszewicz. In 1671, after the war with Moscow ended, Marcybella from the Rahoz family bequeathed the Kolki farmstead in the Mozyrsky Uyezd to the Benedictine nuns.

In 1830, Metropolitan of Mogilev, Kacper Kazimierz Cieciszowski, conducted a visitation. Based on the inspection documents, Ignacy Borejko Chodźko described the monastery's assets in 1845. The endowment of the Minsk Benedictine monastery consisted of real estate and capital. The total area of the property was 93 voloks, 25 morgens, and 29 rods (approximately 1,685.3 hectares). The land owned by the nuns included three inns and one mill. The total number of properties included 3 farmsteads, 8 villages, 94 cottages inhabited by peasants, 8 rented houses, and 3 garden houses. The real estate consisted of:

- a plot in Minsk, bequeathed to the nuns by Father Wojciech Sielawa on 14 December 1633;
- the Kodki farmstead in the Rechytsa Uyezd, transferred by Marcybella from the Rahoz family on 14 December 1661;
- the endowment village of the Orsha Benedictine nuns, Borodzin, transferred to the Minsk Benedictine nuns by Bishop Mikolaj Słupski after the Orsha monastery was ruined. The transfer was confirmed by the Vilnius bishop Mikołaj Stefan Pac;
- peasant houses with attached obligations in the village of Zwirblach in the Braslav Uyezd of the Vilna Governorate. The properties were transferred to the Benedictine nuns based on a divisional court verdict over the Mstsislaw governor's estate funds, in exchange for a sum owed to the monastery. After 1812, the Zwirblach settlement was destroyed; during the Metropolitan’s visit in 1830, only two houses inhabited by peasants were recorded in the documents;
- the village of Leonowicze in the Igumensky Uyezd, transferred to the Benedictine nuns by the divisional court over the Oskierko family estate in Szacka.

The capital of the Minsk Benedictine nuns consisted of:

- a sum bequeathed by Father Wojciech Sielawa. In 1830, this capital amounted to 24,115 silver rubles, due to loans and subsequent bequests;
- less certain capitals amounting to 15,333 silver rubles and 75 kopecks.

The annual income of the monastery in 1830 was 3,124 silver rubles and 8.5 kopecks.

In 1841, a secularization reform took place in the Russian Empire. The decree of 25 September 1841 stated that all immovable property belonging to the clergy in the western provinces of Russia should come under the administration of state property. Dioceses and consistories were divided into classes, and monasteries into actual (staffed) and surplus. The Minsk Benedictine monastery was classified in the first class. The nuns received an annual endowment of 2,765 silver rubles, a piece of land, and peasant service.

== Architecture ==
=== Church ===
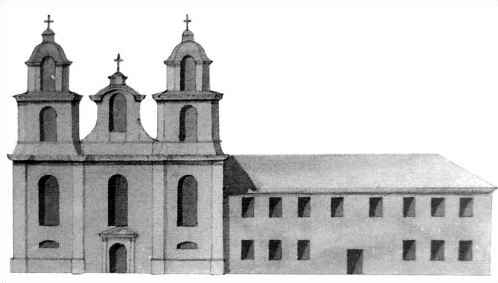
Church of St. Adalbert and the Benedictine monastery according to the Minsk Province atlas (1800)

On 1 December 1647, Vilnius Voivode Krzysztof Chodkiewicz and his wife Zofia signed a contract with master builder Andreas Kromer to construct a brick church for the Benedictine nuns (this document is now archived at Wawel in Kraków). According to the contract, Kromer was responsible for designing the church, supervising the construction, securing materials, and hiring workers from his own journeymen. The contract precisely specified the new church’s dimensions, architectural features, and construction details. The building's length from the entrance to the chancel was to be 10 fathoms (approximately 17.87 meters), and the width 6 fathoms (approximately 10.72 meters). An oratory of 4 square fathoms (approximately 12.77 square meters) was to be aligned with the chancel. On each side, there were to be two square sacristies of 9 square fathoms (28.74 square meters). The sacristy windows were to be fitted with iron grilles. The matroneum above the church porch was to be 4 fathoms (approximately 7.15 meters) long and 11 fathoms (approximately 19.66 meters) wide. The basement was to contain 11 cellars with barred windows. The entire building was to be plastered and whitewashed. The height from the ground to the top of the church was to be 22 ells (approximately 12.98 meters). The roof was to be made of wood and covered with tiles. Two cruciform towers, equal in height to the roof, were to be built on each side above the matroneum, topped with gilded crosses and covered with green sheet metal.

A drawing from 1800 shows the church building with balanced proportions, built in the Baroque style. Likely due to reconstruction and remodeling in the latter half of the 18th century, the church took on a more modest shape. It was a single-nave structure with two towers and a three-sided apse closing the chancel. The church had a gabled tile roof, lower over the chancel. The main façade faced the street, with a curved fronton. Two tall, three-story bell towers with domes covered with sheet metal flanked the façade. The towers housed three bells. The tower stories were separated by a profiled cornice. The side façades featured flat pilasters and cornices. According to 1830 inspection documents, the building's length was 70 ells (approximately 41.3 meters), and the width and height to the vault were 20 ells (approximately 11.8 meters).

By the late 19th century, the church was converted into an Orthodox church and rebuilt in the eclectic style.

Inside, the church had five two-tiered wooden altars decorated with carvings. The main altar’s lower part, above the ciborium, featured a painting of the Virgin Mary with Jesus, with a painting of St. Adalbert above it, and a crucifix figure near the ceiling. The Virgin Mary painting, on canvas, had a silver gilt dress adorned with rubies. On the left side from the main altar towards the entrance were side altars dedicated to St. Thaddeus the Apostle, St. Benedict, and St. Scholastica. On the right side from the chancel towards the exit were altars of the Holy Family and the Immaculate Conception of the Virgin Mary. According to a 19th-century description, the church contained:

...several old Italian master paintings and several newer ones of good quality, a sacristy well-stocked with garments and items for worship, including very costly older and newer chasubles made by the nuns.

A separate entrance led from the brick sacristy to the church. Opposite it in the chancel was an oratory for the nuns, fitted with a grille. A door in the church's side wall led to the monastery. Long galleries adjoined the side walls. The chancel floor was covered with black marble tiles, while the rest of the church had a brick floor. The choir with an organ was above the church entrance. The organ had 10 pipes.

=== Monastery ===
Superiors of the Minsk Benedictine monastery
Name	Status	Years of office
Elżebieta Woynianka	senior sister	1631–1632
Cecylia Protasewiczówna	senior sister	1632–1642
Marianna Pilherówna	senior sister	1639–1640
Cecylia Protasewiczówna	senior sister	1641–1642
Marianna Pilherówna	abbess	1642–1657
Scholastyka Żyżemska	senior sister	1657–1675
Placyda Aniela Stetkiewiczówna	senior sister	1675–1678
Eufemia N. Zienkowiczówna	senior sister	1678–1682
Scholastyka Katarzyna Świrska	abbess	1682–1704
Franciszka Wańkowiczówna	abbess	c. 1705
Zofia Okuliczówna	abbess	1712–1714
Franciszka Wańkowiczówna	abbess	1731–1754
Honorata Korsakówna	abbess	1754–1793
Wiktoria Brygida Galińska	abbess	1793–1815
Anna Teresa Wołodkiewiczówna	abbess	1815–1827
Konstancja Justyna Szwańska	abbess	1827–1838
Klotylda Wojniłowiczówna	prioress	1838–1852
Otylia Moszyńska	prioress	1852–1864
Otylia Moszyńska	abbess	1864–1871

A two-story monastery building was attached in a straight line to the western wall of the church, surrounded by a small garden and separated from the street by a wall. The monastery's grounds, including adjacent buildings and the garden, measured 73.5 fathoms (approximately 131.34 meters) in length and 59 1/6 (approximately 105.74 meters) in width. The area belonging to the Benedictine nuns was reduced in the early 19th century due to the rerouting of Felicjańska Street, which marked the monastery's land boundary. The area was surrounded by a wall with several gates.

The monastery was a two-story rectangular building with a gabled roof, attached to the south wall of the tower of the church. The building had two symmetrical rows of rectangular windows. The ground floor housed the refectory, kitchen, bakery, several monastic cells, a storeroom, and various utility rooms. The monastery had 15 monastic cells in total, heated by a system of ceramic radiators within the walls connected to stoves. The monastery had its own library, which, according to 1830 records, contained 24 books. The building also had a basement. A wooden annex with a kitchen, priest’s quarters, and other utility rooms was added to the monastery walls.

Nearby, to the southeast of the monastery, were freestanding wooden farm buildings: two annexes, a granary, a stable, three cowsheds, and a large building with storage rooms. According to an 1804 inventory, the monastery orchard had 150 trees. Next to the orchard was a garden that in 1796 extended to the city rampart. The monastery also had a walled cemetery with one gate.

== Personal structures ==
According to the documentation from the visitation of Metropolitan Kacper Cieciszowski in 1830, there were 78 individuals residing in the monastery:

- 26 clerics: 1 abbess, 18 office holders and consecrated sisters, 7 professed sisters;
- 29 secular inhabitants: 6 girls being educated for a fee in the monastery school, 12 individuals living on the monastery’s endowment, 11 resident laypersons;
- 23 service personnel: 5 noblewomen, 16 serf girls, 2 farmworkers.

Besides their spiritual exercises and devotions, the nuns were required to participate in the following obligatory liturgies:

- Sunday: conventual Mass with supplication (choral singing);
- Monday: liturgy for the souls of Krzysztof and Zofia Chodkiewicz;
- Wednesday: liturgy for the souls of Wojciech Sielawa and Zofia Zienkowiczowa;
- Saturday: liturgy for the souls of Zuzanna and Helena Stetkiewiczówna, Zuzanna Nowodworska, and Katarzyna Druczykowska;
- Annually: 4 anniversaries (annual commemorations) for the souls of the founders and benefactors.

== Bibliography ==
- Chodźko, Ignacy (1998). Diecezja mińska około 1830 roku. Struktury zakonne (in Polish). Vol. II. Lublin: Instytut Europy Środkowo-Wschodniej. ISBN 83-85854-42-8.
- Sułkowski, Wincenty (1889). Kartka z dziejów kościoła katolickiego w Rosyi. Biskupstwo mińskie (in Polish). Kraków: Anczyc i Spółka.
- Pazniak, Zianon (1985). Рэха даўняга часу (in Belarusian). Minsk: Narodnaja Aswieta.
