= Jesuit College in Minsk =

Jesuit monastery complex in Minsk, Belarus

53°54′11.54″N 27°33′16.87″E

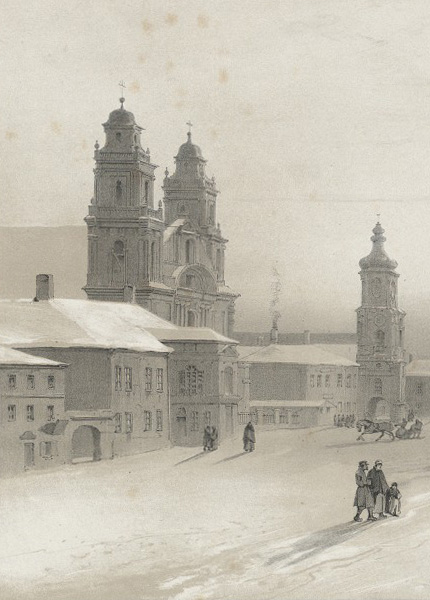
Jesuit church and to the right of it Jesuit College in an illustration from the early 19th century

The Jesuit College in Minsk (Latin: Collegium Minscense Societatis Jesu, Belarusian: Мінскі езуіцкі калегіум, romanized: Minski jezuicki kaliehium, Russian: Минский иезуитский коллегиум) was a Jesuit monastery complex in Minsk. It included a church, a monastery building, a school (operated by the Jesuits from 1656 to 1773), and later consistorial premises. The Jesuit school in Minsk provided education in the humanities.

The Jesuits arrived in Minsk in 1654 and were allocated a manor house at the corner of Kojdanowska Street and High Market Street. Over time, the monastery estate was expanded and enlarged until the suppression of the Jesuits in 1773, encompassing almost the entire quarter in the southeast part of High Market. The Jesuit college complex was built on the site of wooden buildings between 1733 and 1739. Most of the complex was destroyed during the city's reconstruction after the World War II. However, the Jesuit church has survived to the present day, serving as the cathedral of the Roman Catholic Archdiocese of Minsk–Mohilev, along with part of one of the buildings, which, after modernization, houses a music high school.

== Location ==
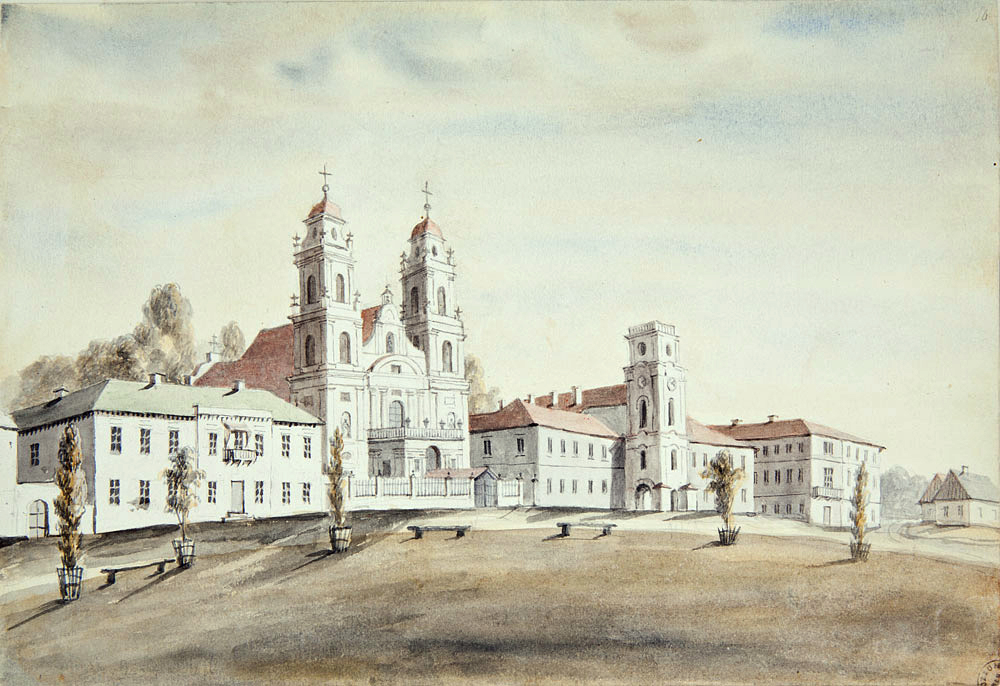
School, church and Jesuit College in a painting by Napoleon Orda

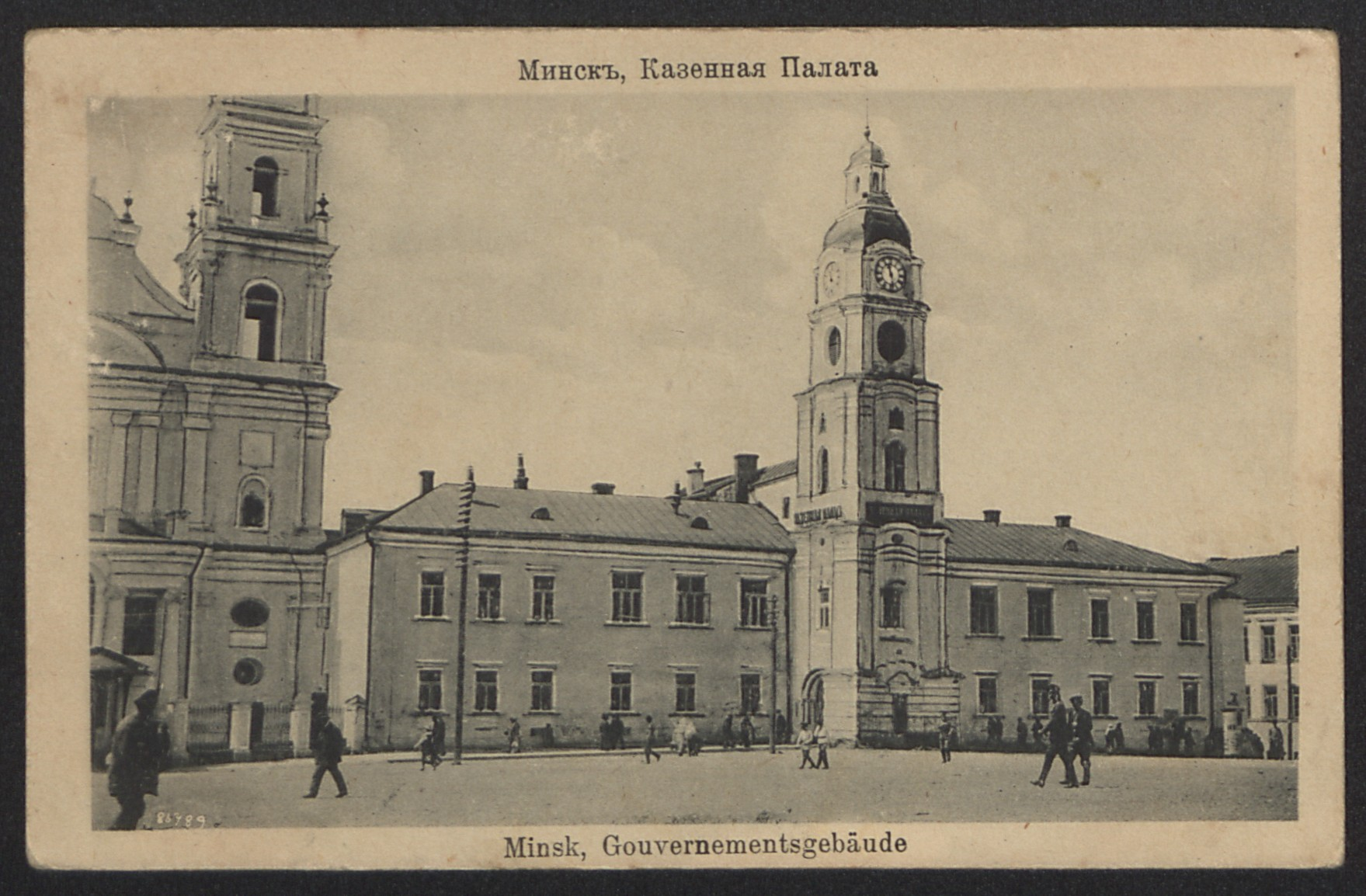
Jesuit College on a postcard from the early 20th century

The monastery complex was located in the southeast part of the Minsk district known as High Market. It was situated within a block bordered to the northeast by High Market (currently Swabody Square), to the southeast by Zborowa Street (currently Internacjonalna Street), to the southwest by Felicjan Street (currently Komsomolska Street), and to the northwest by Kojdanowska Street (currently Rewolucyjna Street). The Jesuit church, serving as the cathedral of the Roman Catholic Archdiocese of Minsk–Mohilev, has been located at 9 Swabody Square since 1993. One of the buildings of the former Jesuit college (7 Swabody Square) now houses the Republican Gymnasium-College at the Belarusian State Academy of Music. The palace of Heger, gifted to the Jesuits in 1656, was situated on Kojdanowska Street (currently 1 Rewolucyjna Street).

== History ==
According to the Jesuit historian, Franciszek Rzepnicki, the Jesuits arrived in Minsk in the first half of the 17th century. Duke Paweł Sanguszko brought the monks to the city in 1631, endowing them with a church and college. Other sources indicate the year 1654 when Prince Hieronim Władysław Sanguszko, the Bishop of Smolensk, granted the Minsk Jesuits a permanent fund. They acquired a brick mansion from Jegor Heger at the corner of Kojdanowska Street and High Martek, which the monks designated as their headquarters. In the early period of their activities in Minsk, their community had the status of a mission dependent on the Jesuit college in Nyasvizh. In 1686, the Jesuits obtained the status of residents, and in 1714, they were granted a college, which marked the high level of education they provided.

The residential buildings were systematically modernized until the end of the 18th century. Thanks to donations from the Ogiński and Brzostowski families, the Jesuits built a wooden school and a church. The educational institution changed its location during the century of Jesuit activity in Minsk. By 1699, a wooden school was replaced with a brick one. On 24 April 1700, the cornerstone of a new brick church was solemnly dedicated. On 16 April 1710, Bishop Konstanty Kazimierz Brzostowski of Vilnius dedicated the church under the invocation of Jesus, Virgin Mary, and Saint Barbara. In 1716, the old church was adapted for use as a school. In 1723, the then rector Jakub Wołodkowicz initiated the construction of a brick building, which was built intermittently between 1733 and 1739 and then in 1748.

In 1723, the reconstruction of the Heger house began, and a two-story building was erected near the northwest corner of the brick church, housing professors' and masters' rooms. Later, a three-story wing was added parallel to Kojdanowska Street, which included the kitchen and refectory, among other facilities. The final appearance of the complex was formed between 1733 and 1738, and in 1739, the construction of the clock tower was completed. It stood in the middle of the facade facing High Market. In 1749, next to the church, a pharmacy building was erected, along with agricultural and ancillary buildings. In 1746, a three-story building was built on Kojdanowska Street, housing a kitchen, 6 rooms, and an ornate refectory. During this time, rhetoric, poetry, syntax, grammar, theology, Hebrew language, ethics, mathematics, physics, logic, and metaphysics were taught at the Jesuit college. There was also a school theater and the best library in the city. In 1770, the school building was renovated. In 1773, a papal bull abolished the Jesuit order. The church received the status of a parish church. A six-year secular district school was established based on the college, under the Commission of National Education.

After the Second Partition in 1792, Minsk became part of the Russian Empire. In 1793, the school building was occupied by the governor's residence. After 1798, when the Roman Catholic Diocese of Minsk was established, a three-story building was erected within the college premises, at the height of the cathedral apse, for the needs of the consistory. Until 1820, the offices were housed in the college, then the city council, and from 1852, the treasury. The college tower became a fire observation tower.

During the period of the Byelorussian Soviet Socialist Republic, state offices were located in the Jesuit buildings. Both the tower in front of the college and the monastery building itself were burned during World War II and finally demolished in the 1950s. In 1951, the cathedral was converted into a sports complex for the Spartak society: the church towers were dismantled, a new facade was added to the cathedral in the style of Stalinist classicism, the figurative attic above the apse was destroyed, as well as the domes above the side chapels; the interior of the church was divided into several floors by ceilings. The former Jesuit school building (later the governor's residence) was rebuilt and modernized into a four-story building in 1968 and designated as a music school. On 15 December 1993, the Jesuit church was returned to the faithful. Its exterior appearance was restored to its original shape.

== Endowment ==
Composition of the Jesuit college
Superiors of the order
Łukasz Załuski	1656– 1657
Paweł Idzikowski	1657– 1662
Andrzej Zieniewicz	1668– 1672
Mikołaj Ziernicki	1672– 1674
Jan Portanti	1674– 1677
Piotr Łukaszewicz	1677– 1681
Krzysztof Krzyżewicz	11681– 1683
Jan Łukaszewicz	11683– 1685
Aleksander Frezer	1683– 1988
Jan Bielski	1688– 1691
Wojciech Dzieniszewski	1691– 1694
Michał Bronisz	1694–1697
Cyprian Kunowski	1697–1701
Kazimierz Gnatowski	1701–1704
Antoni Brzostowski	1704–1714
Rectors of the college
Antoni Brzostowski	1714–1717
Jakub Wołodkiewicz	1717–1724
Jan Nowosielski	1724–1727
Kazimierz Frąckiewicz	1727–27 III 1728
Józef Rudomina	1728–3 III 1729
Antoni Chądzyński	1729–1732
Ludwik Sokulski	1732–1735
Teodat Ramułt	1735–20 IV 1736
Michał Bartoszewski	1736–1737
Antoni Woyniłowicz	1737–1740
Jan Zrzelski	1740–1741
Jan Wołodkowicz	1741–1748
Antoni Chądzyński	1748–1749
Franciszek Ogiński	1749–1752
Kazimierz Juraha	1753–17 IV 1757
Romuald Woyniłowicz	1758–1763
Antoni Borkowski	1763–1766
Adam Abramowicz	1766–1770
Aleksander Szukiewicz	1770–19 IV 1771
Franciszek Lubowicki	1771–1773

In 1656, Hieronim Sanguszko granted the Jesuits an endowment of 80,000 Polish złoty, the Krupka estate (later the fund was transferred to the Rakaw estate), and purchased a tenement house from a Minsk citizen named Heger for the price of 5,000 złoty. After the founder's death, his heirs reduced the endowment to 7,000 złoty and left the tenement to the Jesuits, so in the second half of the 17th century, due to lack of financial resources, only two monks operated in Minsk. For twenty-six years, they subsisted on alms. In 1682, the voivode of Troki, Cyprian Brzostowski, with his wife Rachel from the Dunin-Rajecki family, bequeathed 50,000 złoty to the Minsk Jesuits on the Niżyce estate. A year later, Marcjan Ogiński, the Lithuanian chancellor, with his wife Izabela from the Hlebowicz family, increased the fund by another 50,000 złoty on the dowry estates of Ogińska – Hliwina and Upierowicze. Later, they transferred these estates to the monks as their property. With the money from the endowment, the Jesuits erected a monastery building, where they opened a school. The endowment granted to the Jesuits was confirmed by a resolution of the Sejm in 1683. After Ogiński's death, the monks became embroiled in a legal battle with the founders' heirs, who demanded the return of the granted estates. It was only the curse cast on the heirs by Bishop Konstanty Kazimierz Brzostowski of Vilnius that caused the heirs to withdraw their claims.

In 1700, the Jesuits began the construction of the church. In 1701, the Jesuit Antoni Brzostowski, brother of Konstanty Brzostowski, bequeathed 14,000 złoty for this purpose. Jan Filipowicz, a canon of Smolensk, allocated 2,000 złoty, and Jerzy Furs donated the village of Wiśnianka. In 1705, during the Lithuanian Tribunal held in Minsk, the nobility raised 50,000 złoty. Cieklewicz and Juniewicz contributed 1,000 złoty for the completion of the church. Jakub Wołodkowicz funded a chapel for the youth, and Franciszek Wołodkowicz covered the cost of building the altar of St. Stanislaus Kostka. The Smolensk canon Mikołaj Przeradowski donated 500 ducats for the construction of the altar of St. Ignatius of Loyola and pipe organs, and also gave the monks a wooden sculpture of the Virgin Mary. The Minsk magistrate Adam Swołyński funded the altar of St. John the Baptist. Bishop Konstanty Brzostowski of Vilnius donated a miraculous image of the Virgin Mary along with two golden and pearl robes, as well as several vestments, and images of saints Anthony of Padua, Teresa of Ávila, and Francis of Assisi, along with 200 books for the monastery library. In 1713, the Minsk voivode Krzysztof Zawisza funded a chapel in the church, to which he donated the body of St. Felician of Rome. In 1730, reconciled through the efforts of the monks, the Zawisz, Bykowski, and Wołodkowicz families donated a silver covering for the coffin with the body of St. Felician and a silver lamp to the Jesuit church, as well as funds for raising the church towers, plastering and whitewashing the temple, as well as bells and a clock. In 1732, the Furs family bequeathed the Jesuits a farmstead beyond Tatarska Street, covering an area of 5 voloks (approximately 83.98 hectares), called Ludimont by the monks, i.e., a place of entertainment, and designated for the recreation of young people.

The annual income of the monks was 2,000 złoty in 1685, 5,000 złoty in 1705, and 4,000 złoty in 1749. Before the dissolution of the order in 1773, the Minsk Jesuits owned 54 estates in the villages of Hać, Hliwin, Upierowicze, Pruszkowicze, Ślepianka, and Usa. In addition, income was generated from forest and arable land covering approximately 500 voloks (approximately 8,398.08 hectares). The total income from the estates amounted to 72,000 złoty annually.

== Architecture ==
The architectural layout of the Jesuit college was characteristic of the flourishing Minsk Baroque style during the period from the mid-17th to the early 18th century. Elements of the complex associated with monastic life had a simple, austere shape, contrasting with the lofty facade of the church.

The residence of the Minsk Jesuits was located in a manor house purchased from the townsman Jegor Heger, surrounded by high stone walls with several gates. It was situated to the right of the church (currently at 1 Rewolucyjna Street). Behind the walls were agricultural buildings: a wooden house, stable, brewery, and granary. The dominant feature of the manor was a small palace, with its facade facing the square. It was covered by a hipped shingle roof with three gilded iron weather vanes. Each weather vane depicted St. George the Victorious, battling a dragon with a spear. The fourth weather vane was located above the porch and depicted the fairy Mieluzina (mermaid), playing a lute. On the ground floor were living quarters, a kitchen, and a pantry. Internal stairs led to the upper floor, where there was a gallery with ornate turned balusters, a refectory, and living quarters. The ceilings of the palace were adorned with frescoes. The house was heated using Dutch stoves decorated with white and green tiles, as well as fireplaces. The rooms were furnished. Over time, the residence was renovated by the monks into a residential house for priests and a small chapel.

The Jesuit school was initially wooden. At the end of the 17th century, a two-story masonry school was built. In 1799, the building was completely renovated in the classical style and adapted for high-ranking officials' residence.

The bell tower, erected in the late Baroque style in 1750 in front of the Jesuit residence, to the right of the church, completed the composition of the college complex. It was built on a square plan, had three stories, and was crowned with a Baroque dome. A clock was hung on the upper floor. It was more aesthetic, graceful, and harmonious than the church towers. In the 19th century, the dome was removed from the tower. At the beginning of the 20th century, two additional stories were added to the tower, while maintaining its architectural style, and the dome was restored.

== Personnel composition ==
The reduction of capital after the death of Hieronim Sanguszko led to a decrease in the number of monks active in Minsk. Between 1656 and 1682, only two Jesuits – Łukasz Załuski and Ignacy Bekker – operated there. After the endowments from the Brzostowski and Ogiński families in 1682, their number increased to six, and by 1692, it reached twelve. During the period from 1730 to 1773, the Jesuit college had fifteen priests engaged in scholarly, educational, and missionary activities. Among the members of the college were Antoni Brzostowski, Michał and Karol Korycki, Józef Baka, and the rector Rudolf Rudomina. From 1656 to 1714, the Jesuits in Minsk had fifteen successive superiors. When the monastic residence gained the status of a college, rectors held the highest office. Between 1714 and 1773, the college had twenty rectors. The monks at the college supported thirty poor students.

In 1773, the Jesuits left Minsk and moved to Polotsk, which had become part of the Russian Empire after the First Partition. There, Bishop Stanisław Bohusz Siestrzeńcewicz, at the behest of Catherine the Great, opened a novitiate for them. Seventeen of them remained in Minsk as secular priests and taught at the transformed sub-collegiate schools, administered from 1773 to 1792 by the Commission of National Education. Among them were Korycki, Przetocki, Ławrynowicz, Brzozowski, Olendzki, and the rector Tadeusz Obrąpalski.

In the mid-18th century, infirmarians (caretakers of the medical cabinet) and pharmacists worked in the pharmacy opened at the college. Jerzy Lessig served as a pharmacist from 1737 to 1738, while Adam Kitz held the position from 1756 to 1757.

In 1715, the Brotherhood of St. Barbara began its activities at the newly built church. In 1732, the Brotherhood of the Good Death was established, followed by the Brotherhood of Divine Providence in 1772. The Brotherhood of the Most Holy Virgin Mary, together with the school youth association, took care of the Holy Trinity Chapel.

== Educational activities ==
Initially, the Jesuits conducted educational activities in a chapel adapted for this purpose, located in Heger's mansion. They also participated in the activities of the parish of St. Peter and St. Paul. The Jesuit pastors preached their sermons in Polish, Lithuanian, and, in the St. Peter and Paul Church, in Ruthenian. A Student Congregation was established at the newly built church, which, among other duties, took care of the Holy Trinity Chapel. The monks conducted missions outside the city in places such as Błonie, Głuszyn, Illiczany, Niżyce, and Radoszkowice. Mobile missions were also organized. A scholarship program existed for poor students from 1685.

Grammar was taught in the school from 1672, and in 1679, poetry and rhetoric were introduced into the curriculum. From 1729 to 1770, an annual course in philosophy was organized for secular students. A break was taken from 1731 to 1732 when the philosophy course was replaced by a course in moral theology. From 1748 to 1749, there were philosophical studies for clerics. The last probation for the Jesuits took place between 1765 and 1766.

The students and lecturers had access to a library, which contained around 200 volumes in 1710. The library's collection was expanded through purchases. After the dissolution of the order, the management of the library was taken over by the Commission of National Education.

== Bibliography ==
- Sułkowski, W. (1889). Kartka z dziejów kościoła katolickiego w Rosyi: biskupstwo mińskie (in Polish). Kraków: Wł. L. Anczyca i Spółki.
- Pazniak, Zianon (1985). Рэха даўняга часу: Кн. для вучняў (in Belarusian). Minsk: Narodnaja aswieta.
- Dzianisaw, Uładzimir Mikalajevich (2001). "Комплекс езуітаў". In Shtykhaw, G. (ed.). Памяць: Гіст.-дакум. хроніка Мінска (in Belarusian). Vol. 1. Minsk: BiełTA. ISBN 985-6302-33-1.
