= Church of St. Thomas Aquinas and the Dominican monastery in Minsk =

Catholic monastery complex in Minsk, Belarus

Church of St. Thomas Aquinas
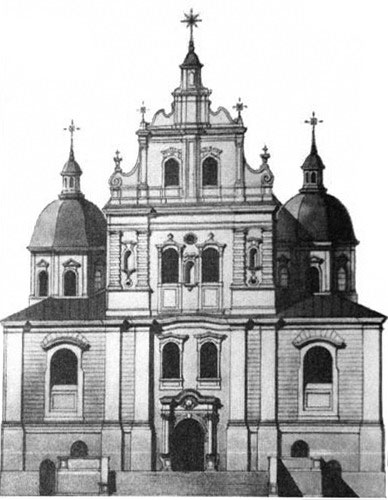
- Facade reconstruction
- Church of St. Thomas Aquinas
- Location: Minsk
- Country: Belarus
- Denomination: Catholic
- Churchmanship: Latin

History
- Dedication: Thomas Aquinas

Architecture
- Years built: 1615–1640
- Closed: 1833
- Demolished: 1950

The Church of St. Thomas Aquinas and the Dominican monastery was a Catholic monastery complex in Minsk founded in the early 17th century, destroyed in 1950. It was built in the Baroque style. The foundations and cellars have been preserved, requiring detailed archaeological research. The monastery complex occupied a plot in the High Market area covering over 1 hectare (part of the block where the Palace of the Republic stands today). The buildings belonging to the Minsk Dominicans included a brick church and monastery, as well as wooden outbuildings: two wings, a stable, a granary (świran), a well, and others. In the southwest part of the plot, there was a garden. The monastery complex was surrounded by a high wall with a large entrance gate.

== Location ==
The church and monastery of the Dominican fathers in Minsk were located at the High Market. The plot on which the buildings were located covered approximately 1.44 hectares (2 morgens and 58 rods). It was bordered by Wołoska, Dominikańska, and Garska streets. The cellars of the church and monastery have been preserved at the corner of today's Internacjonalna and Engels' streets.

== History ==
The Dominican monastery and the Church of St. Thomas Aquinas in Minsk were founded in 1600 by Sophia of Wołkiewicze (alias Zawiszów) Słuszkowa (alias Służkowa), a voivode of Cēsis, and a widow of Krzysztof Służka, the voivode of Polish Livonia. The Dominicans came to Minsk at her invitation from Vilnius. In 1604, returning from the war, the szlachta imposed a "hoof" tax (from horses) to complete the construction of the temple and the monastery. Her coats of arms were to remind of this, placed on the cornices. In 1605, the Dominicans announced at the chapter that they accepted the foundation.

The original buildings were wooden. In 1615, Peter Tyszkiewicz, Count of Lahoysk and Berdychiv, the judicial starosta and voivode of Minsk, donated to the Dominican fathers a plot of land for perpetual ownership, where the construction of the stone church and monastery began. The funds for the construction also came from donations from the Minsk nobility, as evidenced by fund bonds and documents preserved in the archive. The initial founders included Marcelina of the Korecki princes Chlebowiczowa alias Hlebowiczowa (after her second husband Bukowska), the voivode of Vitebsk, Jakub alias Jakób Pacewicz, the parish priest of Orsha, Jerzy Zawisza, and Jan Wołek. The construction of the stone church and monastery lasted until 1640.

The monastery complex was located near the southern line of the city's fortifications – an earthen rampart with a moat and bastions. In the second half of the 17th century, it served as one of the defensive outposts of the city. Travelers passing through Minsk emphasized the splendor and wealth of the Dominican church, and the pantler of Tsar Peter the Great, Pyotr Tolstoy, while in Minsk in 1697, admired the organs in the Church of St. Thomas Aquinas.

The completion of construction work at the monastery occurred in 1703. Six years later, partial reconstruction of the church began. The facade was restored. At the end of the 18th century, the last renovation of the church took place, as evidenced by the contract discovered by Euzebiusz Łopaciński in the 1930s, drawn up in 1781 between the superior of the Minsk Dominicans, Benedykt Rybczyński, and the master of the masons' guild, Andrzej Makarewicz. As a result of the work carried out at that time, the church received an unusual "ensemble" composition – two side plans, stretched in space.

On July 29 (August 11 (Note: According to the New Style dates.)), 1798, the apostolic nuncio, Lorenzo Litta, designated the Dominican monastery as the residence of the bishop of the newly created diocese of Minsk by his decree In omnes agri Dominici partes.

As a temporary residence for bishops until another specific house for bishops is acquired, we designate the monastery of the Dominican order located in the same city, which is situated a short distance from the aforementioned cathedral church.

As a result of repression after the November Uprising in 1833, the Dominican monastery was abolished. The church, however, was designated as the parish church of Minsk, administered by the secular clergy. In 1845, by order of the Russian authorities, the monastery was adapted for use as a Catholic seminary.

In 1870, due to Tsarist repression after the failure of the January Uprising, the sub-Dominican monastery was converted into barracks, and the church into an Eastern Orthodox church. In the 1870s, a project was developed to adapt the former Dominican church for use as a city theater, but it was not implemented. Sources do not indicate in which years of the 19th century the upper parts of the chapels protruding above the roofline were dismantled. In the 20th century, the church was used as a fire station. On 5 July 1926, the sub-Dominican complex was placed under state protection.

During the occupation of Minsk by Soviet troops in 1944, the monastery complex was damaged. In 1945, the Byelorussian SSR received reparations from Germany for the renovation of buildings, and preliminary conservation work was carried out in the church in the late 1940s. Despite these efforts, the architectural monument was blown up in 1950 on the orders of the Soviet authorities.

== Endowment of the Dominican monastery and church ==
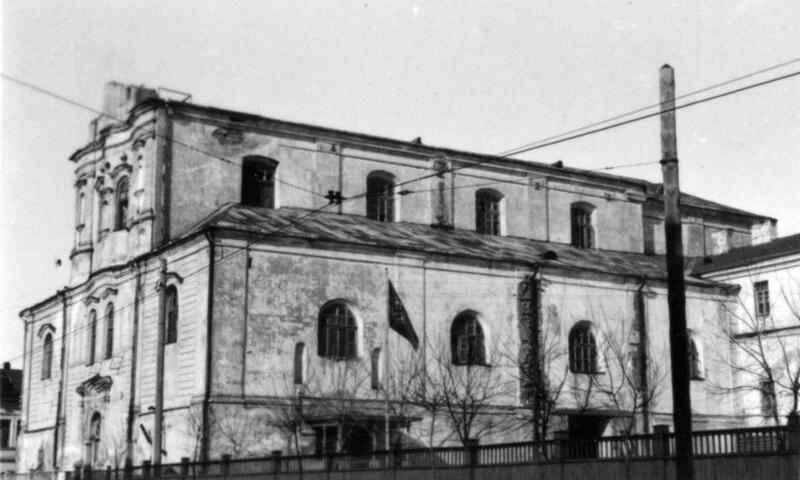
General view (1943)

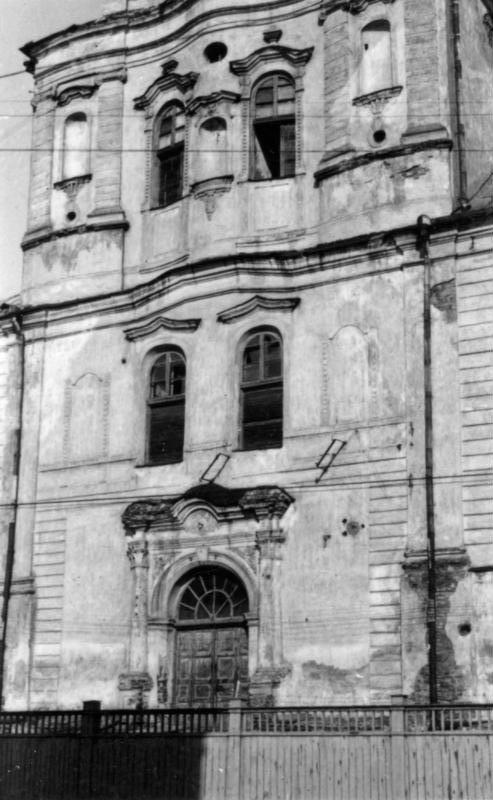
Fragment of the church's facade (1943)

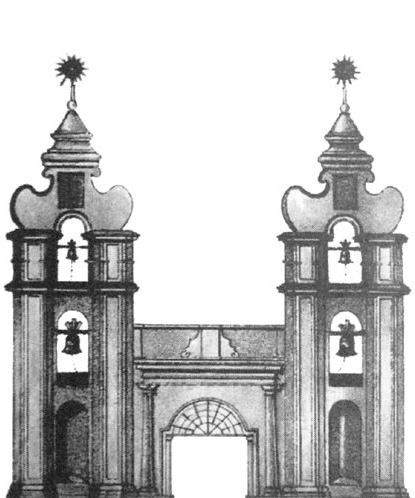
Monastery gate

In 1830, a canonical visitation by Metropolitan bishop Kacper Kazimierz Cieciszowski of Mogilev took place. Based on the inspection documentation, Ignacy Borejko Chodźko described the monastery's estate in 1845.

In the city, the Dominicans owned a plot of land on High Market, donated to them by Piotr Tyszkiewicz. On this plot, a brick church and monastery were erected. On 8 December 1640, Piotr Wołk bequeathed to the monks in his will his estate, Wołkowszczyzna (also known as Rumnickie), located 5 versts (approximately 5.4 km) from Minsk. In 1830, within the boundaries of Wołkowszczyzna, there were three taverns, eight continuous peasant settlements, and one rent-paying one. The estate's area was 3 voloks, 25 morgens, 208 rods (approximately 62.75 hectares), with a recorded number of 30 men in the inspection data.

The Dominican capital sums came from the bequests of Ignacy Piotrowin Janiszewski, the deputy governor of Minsk – 600 silver rubles, and the Wołodkowicz family – 1500 silver rubles. According to the visitation data from 1830, the Minsk Dominicans had two capitals. The certain and interest-bearing one, originating from various legations, amounted to 5110 silver rubles. The uncertain one, in the amount of 8192 silver rubles and 50.5 kopecks, was credited to the Minsk qahal. Despite the establishment of a court case, it has not been recovered.

== Architecture ==
The architectural ensemble of the Dominican monastery featured a distinct spatial composition, with the entrance gate as the foreground, directly followed by the church facade, while the monastery walls served as a prominent backdrop.

=== Church ===
The dominant feature of the monastery complex was the Church of St. Thomas Aquinas, situated in its corner section. The church was a classical three-aisled basilica without a transept, with a rectangular chancel. It combined characteristics of late Renaissance and early Baroque styles. Symmetrically arranged chapels flanked the facade, each with octagonal tholobates crowned by domes with roof lanterns. The central part of the facade featured an unconventional architectural solution, typical of Eastern Baroque: the axial symmetry was defined not by openings, but by the space between them. The tall body of the church on the facade was topped by a multi-storey, ornamented gable adorned with statues, strongly decorated with bands of cornices, bossaged pilasters, sculpted surrounds of arched window openings, and side volutes, etc. This was how Ignacy Borejko Chodźko described it in 1845.

This temple, the largest in the city, measured 63 ells in length, 48 in width, and 30 in height. It is a beautiful and impressive piece of architecture, maintained in the French style, with a lofty pediment topped with a turret, with a vault, set on cellars. This building rises on pilasters crowned with arcades; these separate the nave from the chapels, which end in domes, slightly raised above the roofline.

The interior of the temple was adorned with frescoes and Baroque stucco altars with rocaille – one main and 12 side ones by 6 inter-nave posts.

The following altars were located in the church (progressing from the Zawiszów chapel into the depth of the temple):

- St. John of Nepomuk altar (according to a description from around 1830, the altar did not yet have a painting and was unfinished),
- A wooden, adorned with gilded sculptures, the Immaculate Conception of the Blessed Virgin Mary altar did not have a painting,
- On the left side from the entrance, a brick altar of St. Dominic,
- By the pillar in front of the sanctuary, a brick altar with columns and statues, in the middle with a sculpture of the Crucified Christ,
- A wooden St. Mary Magdalene altar, adorned with carvings and gilding,
- Similar in design to the St. Mary Magdalene altar, St. Jack altar,
- A brick altar of St. Catherine of Siena, adorned with plasterwork,
- Opposite the pulpit, St. Vincent Ferrer altar with gilded decorations,
- A brick altar of St. Barbara with columns; the painting of the saint was covered by a carved wooden dress,
- A brick altar of St. Jude Thaddeus with columns; the saint's image was adorned with a silver robe,
- Altar of Mother of God with the image of the patroness in richly adorned garments,
- In the depth of the central nave, the main altar, with its mensa separating the monastic choir from the temple; the altar was painted in a trompe-l'œil style on the wall, imitating the architecture of the Corinthian order, in the middle was placed the image of the church's patron, St. Thomas Aquinas, depicted at the moment of writing with a golden pen.

The monks' choir was separated from the temple by a masonry mensa of the altar with a gilded ciborium of carved workmanship. The music choir was located above the entrance. Ornate organs were built for 24 voices.

Adjacent to the chancel from the northeast side was a rectangular sacristy, which was aligned with one of the side naves. On the opposite wall of the chancel, there was a longitudinal three-story monastery building.

At some distance in front of the facade stood a large-sized entrance gate. On its sides were two bell towers with original crowns in the shape of four mighty volutes arranged diagonally, topped with Baroque ridge turrets. The towers were connected by an entrance portico in the form of a triumphal arch.

=== Monastery ===
The monastery building had a rectangular plan, an elongated two-story structure with a corridor running inside. It had a thatched roof. It joined the chancel and the end of the church's side nave at a right angle, merging with them into one monumental and compact mass. In the central part of the facade was an avant-corps, through which the entrance to the building led.

The Dominican monastery possessed a library. During the metropolitan visitation in 1830, its relocation was underway, so it was not precisely described. Documentation noted that it contained 70 Latin volumes on theological subjects and 83 Polish volumes covering various topics.

== Personnel structures ==
=== Clergy ===
According to data from the metropolitan visitation in 1830, the monastery housed six priests, eight clerics, three novices, and eight laymen.

The monks of the monastery were obliged to celebrate liturgies for the intentions of the living and deceased founders of the monastery and the church. The obligatory masses were divided into:

==== Weekly ====
- On Sunday, one sung Mass was celebrated for Leon and Paweł Wołodkowicz, as well as one sung Mass for the living and deceased members of the Janiszewski family, and a read Mass before the altar of St. Catherine;
- On Tuesday, a read Mass was held for the soul of Marcybella of Korecki Hlebowiczowa;
- On Wednesday, a read Mass was held for the souls of Dominik and Teresa Wołodkiewicz;
- On Thursday, a read Mass was held before the altar of St. Magdalene for the soul of Marcybella;
- On Friday, a read Mass was held before the altar of Our Lord Jesus for the soul of Piotr Wołek;
- On Saturday, a sung Mass was held for the soul of Marcybella.

==== Monthly ====
One sung Mass was celebrated for the souls of Mikołaj Rodkiewicz, Aleksander Wojdźman, Kazimierz Nowacki, Jan Furs, Franciszek and Joanna Dornałowicz, Jerzy and Jan Derszkof, Zuzanna, Aleksander, Teodor, and Anna. Additionally, one sung Mass was held for the soul of Father Stefan Koczarski and before the altar of St. John the Baptist for the souls of Jan and Joanna Kostrowicki.

==== Quarterly ====
One sung Mass was celebrated for the souls of Father Stefan Koczarski, Mikołaj Rodkiewicz, the parents of the monks, those resting in the monastery cemeteries, the souls of relatives, friends, and benefactors, as well as the brothers and sisters of the third order.

==== Monastic ====
Throughout the year, 48 liturgies with a full office for the deceased were celebrated for the deceased brothers and sisters of the Rosary, their relatives, and benefactors of the confraternity, operating in the Dominican church.

=== Confraternity ===
At the Church of St. Thomas Aquinas, the Holy Rosary Confraternity served. It sustained itself through contributions and collections, having no capital. Among the daily voluntary duties of the confraternity were singing the Rosary in the church, providing some altars with candles and lamps, and decorating two confraternity altars. Church silver, liturgical vestments, altar furnishings, decorations, and heraldic flags were purchased with money from alms.

== Bibliography ==
- "Учрежденiе Минской Епархiи Лаврентiй изъ Маркизовъ Литта и проч". Акты и Грамоты о устройствђ и управленiи pимско-католической церкви въ имперiи россiйской и царствђ польскомъ (in Russian). Петербургъ. 1849.
- Chodźko, Ignacy Borejko (1998). Diecezja Mińska około 1830 roku. Strukury zakonne. Vol. 2. Lublin: Instytut Europy Środkowo-Wschodniej.
- Dzianisau, Uładzimir (2001). "Кляштар дамініканцаў". Памяць: Гіст.-дакум. хроніка Мінска. У 4 кн (in Belarusian). Vol. 1. Minsk: Belarusian Telegraph Agency. pp. 322–323. ISBN 985-6302-33-1.
- Habruś, Tamara (2001). Мураваныя харалы. Сакральная архітэктура беларускага барока (PDF) (in Belarusian). Minsk: Uradżaj. ISBN 985-04-0499-X.
- Habruś, Tamara (2003). "Святыні ордэна прапаведнікаў". Nasza Wiera (in Belarusian). 25 (3). Minsk.
- Kułahin, Anatol (2001). Каталіцкія храмы на Беларусі: Энцыкл. даведнік (in Belarusian) (2nd ed.). Minsk: Biełaruskaja Encykłapiedyja. p. 216. ISBN 985-11-0199-0.
- Pazniak, Zianon (1985). Рэха даўняга часу: Кн. для вучняў (PDF) (in Belarusian). Minsk: Narodnaja aswieta. p. 111.
- Sułkowski, Wincenty (1889). Kartka z dziejów kościoła katolickiego w Rosyi. Biskupstwo mińskie. Kraków: Wł. L. Anczyc i Spółka.
