= Diocese of Minsk =

Diocese of Minsk may refer to the following ecclesiastical jurisdictions with episcopal see in the Belarusian city of Minsk :

- the current Diocese of Minsk of the Belarusian Orthodox Church which is under the rule of the Russian Orthodox Church.
- the former Latin Diocese of Minsk, merged into the present Roman Catholic Archdiocese of Minsk-Mohilev
