= Cathedral of the Holy Name of Saint Virgin Mary =

Roman Catholic cathedral in Minsk, Belarus

Cathedral of the Holy Name of Saint Virgin Mary Архікатэдральны касцёл Імя Найсвяцейшай Панны Марыі
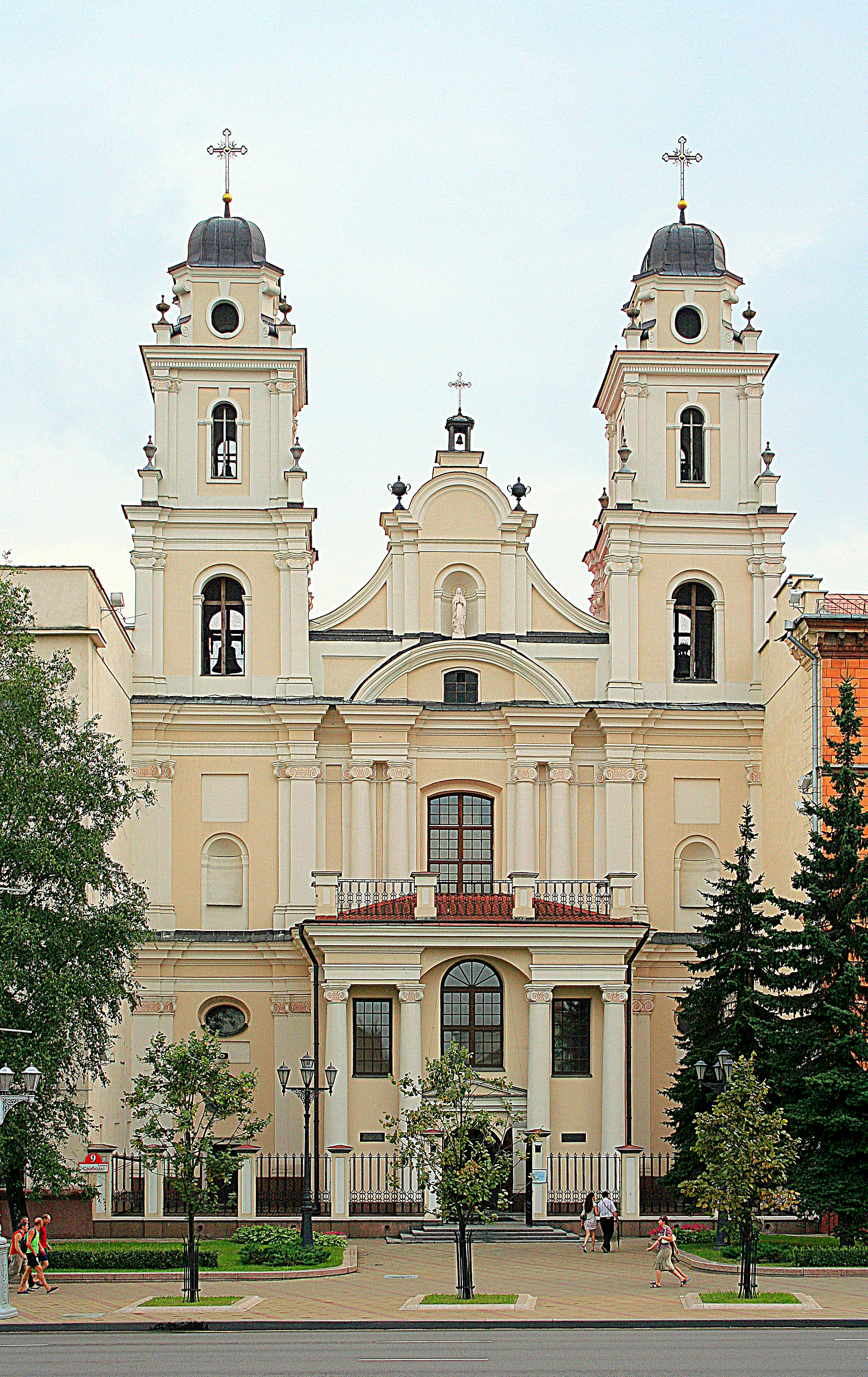
- The Cathedral of the Holy Name of Saint Virgin Mary

Religion
- Affiliation: Roman Catholic
- Year consecrated: 1710

Location
- Location: Minsk, Belarus
- Interactive map of Cathedral of the Holy Name of Saint Virgin Mary; Архікатэдральны касцёл Імя Найсвяцейшай Панны Марыі
- Coordinates: 53°54′11.33″N 27°33′15.85″E

Architecture
- Type: Cathedral
- Style: Baroque
- Completed: 1710

Website
- http://www.katedra.by

Cathedral of the Holy Name of Mary (Belarusian: Архікатэдральны касцёл Найсвяцейшага Імя Найсвяцейшай Панны Марыі, romanized: Archikatedraĺny kaściol Najśviaciejšaha Imia Najśviaciejšaj Panny Maryi) is a Roman Catholic baroque cathedral in Minsk. It is the seat of the Roman Catholic Archdiocese of Minsk-Mohilev.

It was built under the Polish-Lithuanian Commonwealth rule in 1710 as a church for the Jesuit College in Minsk until 1773 when pope Clement XIV suppressed the Jesuit Order. In 1793, after the second partition of the Polish–Lithuanian Commonwealth, the church got a local status. Soon, after creation of the Minsk diocese, the church became the local cathedral.

The cathedral was heavily damaged in a fire in 1797, but was later fully renewed. In 1869, the Minsk diocese was liquidated and the church returned to parish status. In November 1917, the diocese was restored; Zygmunt Łoziński was appointed as a bishop.

In 1920, Łoziński was arrested by Soviet authorities, the cathedral was closed down in 1934.

During the Second World War, the Germans allowed the cathedral to function again, but after the war it was again closed down by the Soviets. In 1951, the cathedral's bell towers were intentionally destroyed by Soviet artillery and the building itself was given to the Spartak sports society.

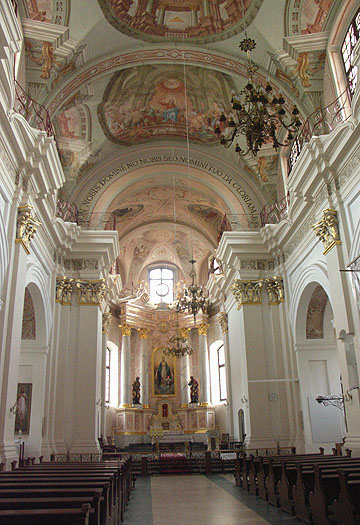
The interior, 2000s

In the beginning of the 1990s, religious services started again. In 1993, the building was given back to the Roman Catholics; by 1997 it had been renovated.

In 2005, the church was given a new organ manufactured in Austria. Around the same time, the frescoes created in the 18th century were also restored.

== See also ==
- List of Jesuit sites
