= Luchey =

Luchey is a surname, and may refer to:

- Chris Luchey, American politician
- Nick Luchey (born 1977), American football player

== See also ==
- Luche
- Luchy
- Lucky
