= Roman Catholic Diocese of Minsk (1798–1869) =

Former territorial unit of the Latin Church

53°52′30.36″N 27°32′8.48″E

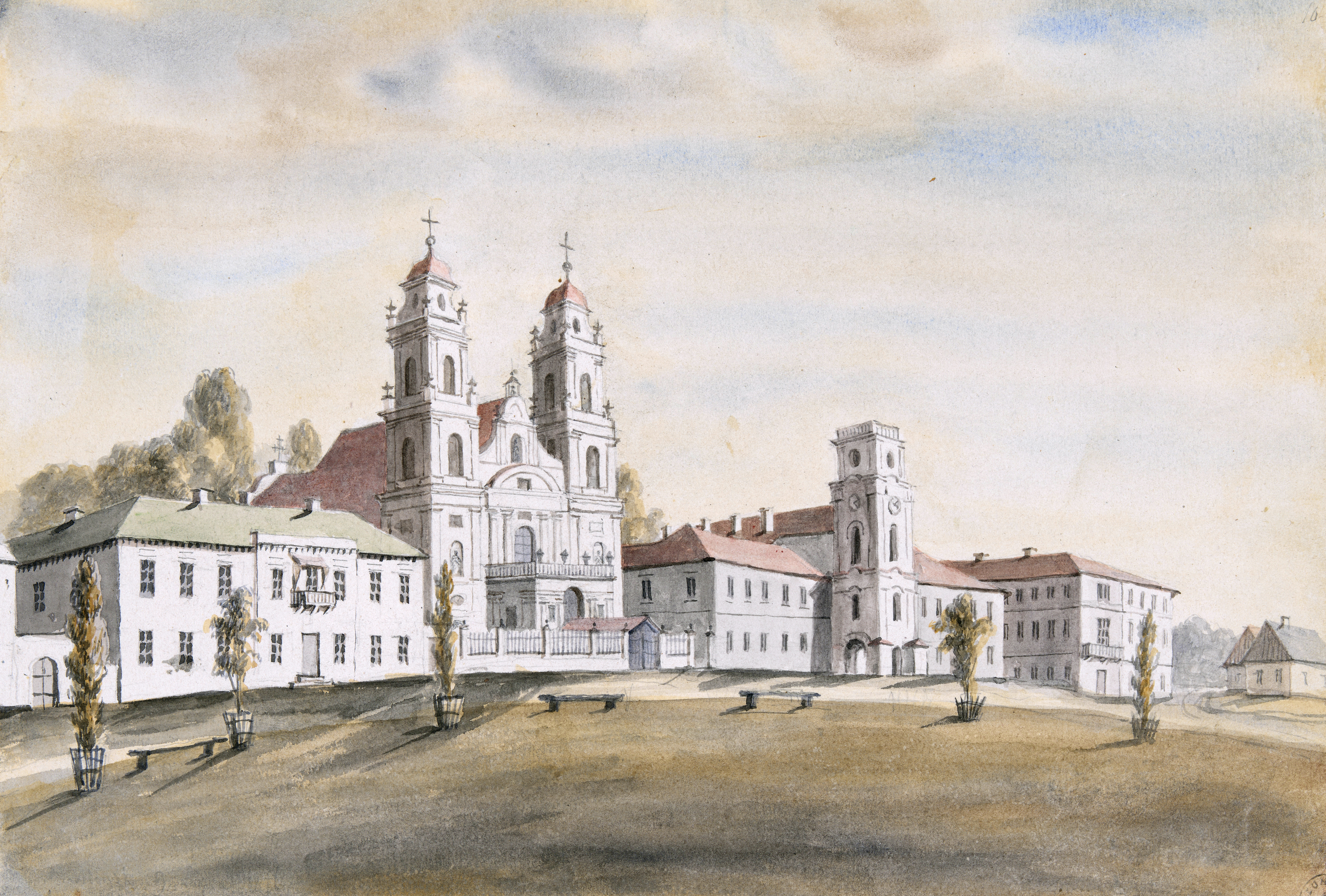
Cathedral in Minsk

The Roman Catholic Diocese of Minsk was a territorial unit of the Latin Church, with its seat in the city of Minsk. It was established by imperial ukase on 28 April 1798, and approved by the Apostolic See by decree on 29 July 1798. It was abolished by imperial ukase in 1869.

The Diocese of Minsk was established in the territories of present-day Belarus, which in the 19th century belonged to the Russian Empire as part of the Russian Partition. Its boundaries were delineated by a triangle, with the northern (upper) vertex being the mouth of the Drissa river into the Daugava, and the base being a line to the south of the Pripyat river. It encompassed the area of the Minsk Governorate and bordered the dioceses of Vilnius, Lutsk, Zhytomyr, and Mogilev. Ecclesiastically, the Minsk diocese was part of the Mogilev ecclesiastical province. Its area at the beginning of its existence was over 90,000 km^{2}.

The period after the January Uprising was the decline of the diocese. It was abolished in 1869. The areas under its care were re-incorporated into the Vilnius diocese but later, after 1882, the territory was governed as apostolic administrator by the Archbishop of Mohilev.

The diocese of Minsk was revived as an independent see in 1917 (Zygmunt Łoziński was the Bishop of Minsk until 1925) but it was vacant between 1925 and 1991 when it merged with Mohilev to form the current Archdiocese of Minsk-Mohilev.

== Catholics in the Russian Empire in the second half of the 18th century ==
=== Catholics in Russia before the First Partition of Poland ===
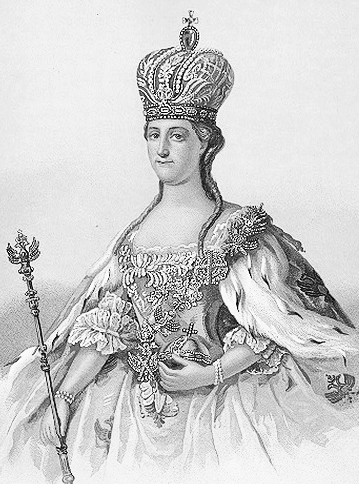
Catherine the Great

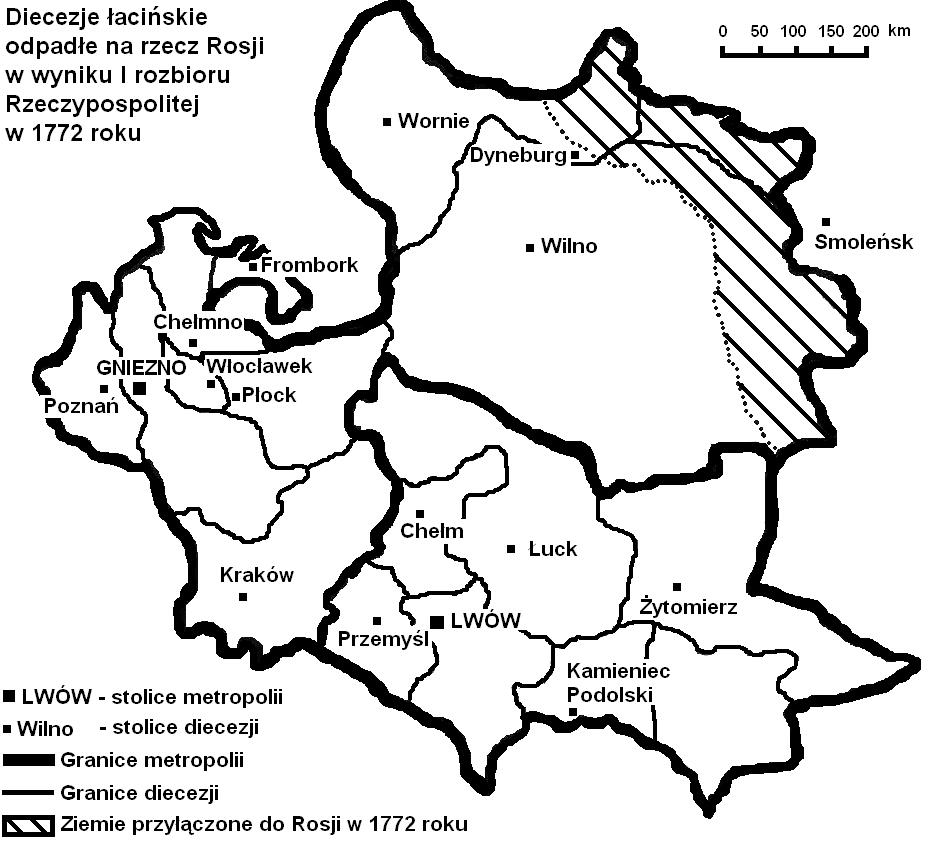
Parts of the diocese of Vilnius and Inflanty, incorporated into Russia in 1772

In the middle of the 18th century, there were about 10,000 Latin Catholics living in the Orthodox Russian Empire. They were exclusively foreigners – Germans, French, Italians, and Poles. They gathered around churches in Moscow and St. Petersburg, as well as in the colonies of foreign evoys, workers, factories, and merchants.

Catholic mission stations operating in various parts of the Russian Empire were subject to the Sacred Congregation for the Propagation of the Faith. By the decree of Catherine the Great on 6 November 1766, Catholic missions and communities were subordinated to the Inflanck-Estonian-Finnish Justiz College. On 12 February 1769, the empress signed the Dannyj Sanktpetersburgsoj Rimsko-Katoličeskoj Cerkvi regulation, specifying the conditions for the activities of Catholic communities in Russia.

As a result of the First Partition of Poland in 1772, Russia expanded its territory by about 92,000 km^{2}, inhabited by about 1.3 million people, including about 100,000 Roman Catholics and about 800,000 Greek Catholics. In terms of the administrative structures of the Roman Catholic Church, Russia received the Diocese of Smolensk and parts of the dioceses of Vilnius and Inflanty belonging to the province of the Archdiocese of Gniezno.

=== Catherine the Great's policy toward Catholics ===
As a result of the First Partition of Poland in 1772, Russia acquired eastern territories with a significant Catholic population. This posed a challenge for organizing the Catholic Church. Anticipating demands from the Roman Curia and having a negative attitude towards the papacy, Catherine the Great decided to address this issue independently. Not recognizing the papal authority over the Catholic Church in the Russian Empire and desiring to eliminate any external influence over it in Russia, Catherine the Great established, by decree on 22 November 1773, the Belarusian Diocese with its seat in Mogilev on the Dnieper river. She appointed Stanisław Bohusz Siestrzeńcewicz, a suffragan bishop of Vilnius, who was to implement her policies towards the Catholic Church and its followers. On the empress' orders, the bishop, among other things, did not announce the papal brief of Clement XIV on the suppression of the Jesuits, as Catherine the Great believed that the order would positively contribute to the development of education in Russia. With authority over the orders in Russia, Siestrzeńcewicz opened a novitiate for the Jesuits in Polotsk. The Belarusian Diocese did not receive canonical approval from the Apostolic See because it was established in violation of canon law principles.

In the 1770s, Catherine the Great introduced restrictions on the contacts of the Catholic clergy in Russia with the Apostolic See, subjected the monastic clergy to the Belarusian bishop, and prohibited the Metropolitan of the Ruthenian Uniate Church, who remained in the Commonwealth, from assuming jurisdiction over the Saint Sophia Cathedral in Polotsk. There was a real threat to the Greek Catholic faithful, as there were discussions in St. Petersburg about appointing an Orthodox bishop to the Uniate diocese. The decree of 13 July 1780 defined Catherine the Great's policy towards the Greek Catholic Church in Russia, condemning it to gradual absorption by the Orthodox Church. As a result of such activities, the Pope, fearing the abolition of the Union and the loss of about 1.2 million faithful, was forced to seek ways of agreement with Catherine the Great. Diplomatic relations between Russia and the Apostolic See were established after 17 January 1782, when the empress unilaterally established the archbishopric of Mogilev headed by Siestrzeńcewicz. The Mogilev archdiocese encompassed the entire Russia, without suffragan dioceses. This issue was to be resolved in the future. The metropolitan's endowment was a government salary of 10,000 silver rubles. To put an end to the uncertain situation in relations between Russia and the Apostolic See, the empress demanded the Pope's approval of the new archbishopric. After more than a year of negotiations, the Pope finally legitimized the archbishopric of Mogilev with the papal brief Onerosa pastoralis officii dated 15 April 1783. In 1784 the Empress appointed Heraclius Lisovsky as Uniate Archbishop of the Archeparchy of Polotsk-Vitebsk.

=== Second and Third Partitions of Poland and their consequences ===
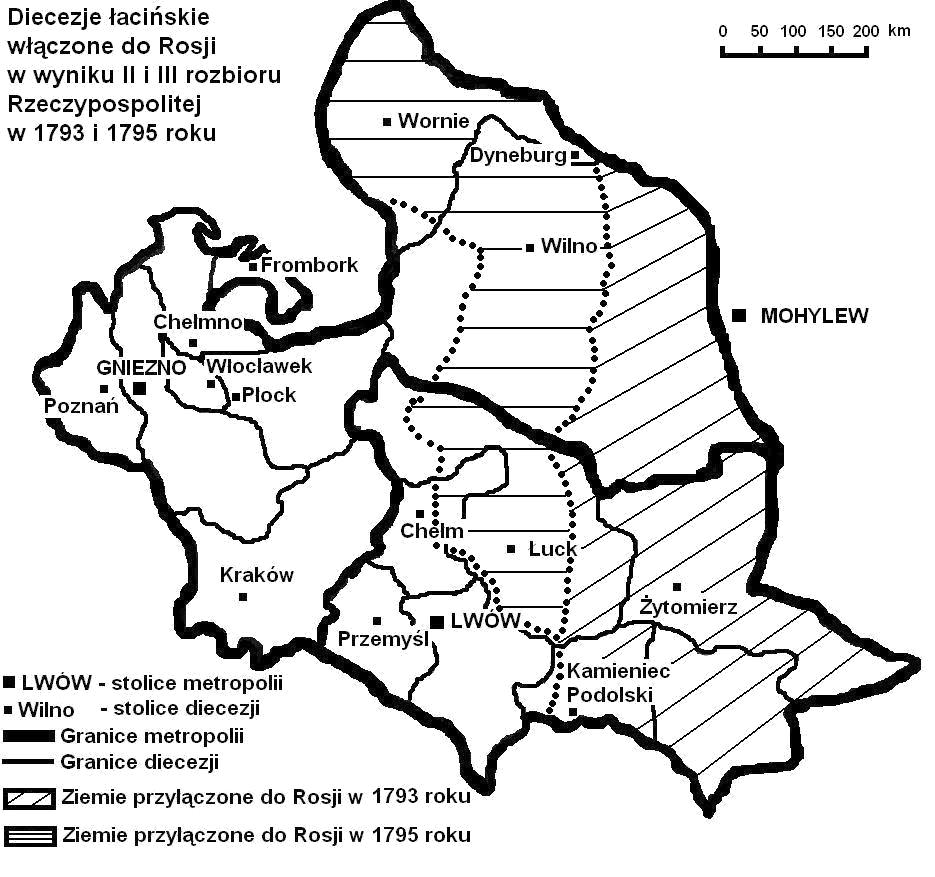
Parts of the Vilnius, Samogitian, Kamianets-Podilskyi, Lutsk dioceses, as well as the entire Inflanty and Kyiv dioceses incorporated into Russia in 1793 and 1795

As a result of the Second and Third Partitions of Poland, Russia absorbed approximately 370,000 km^{2} of territory inhabited by about 5.6 million people, including approximately 2 million Roman Catholics and about 800,000 Greek Catholics. In terms of the administrative division of Roman Catholic dioceses in the Polish–Lithuanian Commonwealth, as a result of the Second and Third Partitions, the Russian Empire annexed from the Lviv ecclesiastical province the Kyiv, Kamianets-Podilskyi, and the larger part of the Lutsk dioceses, which was fragmented by the borders of all three partitioning powers. From the Archdiocese of Gniezno, the remaining part of the Inflanty diocese, almost the entire Vilnius and Samogitia dioceses, fell within the borders of Russia.

After the annexation to Russia in 1793 and 1795 of parts of the Vilnius, Samogitia, Kamianets-Podilskyi, Lutsk dioceses, as well as the entire Inflanty and Kyiv dioceses, it was necessary to reorganize the existing territorial structures of the Catholic Church in the Russian Empire. This matter became very urgent because all the partitioning powers prohibited bishops from exercising jurisdiction beyond the borders of their state. After the occupation of the Grand Duchy of Lithuania, in accordance with the prevailing practice, a homage delegation representing all social groups, including the clergy of Vilnius, was sent to St. Petersburg to pay homage and present the society's demands. As part of this delegation, the Inflanty bishop Jan Nepomucen Kossakowski suggested to the government the idea of expanding the Inflanty diocese at the expense of the extensive Vilnius diocese. Temporarily, the ecclesiastical matters in the territories annexed to Russia as a result of the Second and Third Partitions of Poland were regulated by the decree of Catherine the Great on 6 September 1795, which abolished the Vilnius, Lutsk, Kamianets-Podilsky, and Kyiv dioceses. The non-canonical Inflanty, Pinsk, and Letychiv dioceses were established, with the bishopric in Vilnius (headed by J. N. Kossakowski), Pinsk, and Letychiv. The Samogitia diocese continued to function unchanged. Kossakowski, however, went to Grodno, where all administrative matters of the country were concentrated. With the permission of Governor Nikolai Repnin and Catherine the Great, the bishop applied to the Pope for recognition of the September acts, but without success.

== Population and religions of Minsk in the 19th century ==
In terms of religious affiliation, at the turn of the 18th and 19th centuries, the area of the Minsk diocese was inhabited by Catholics of two rites: Latin (mainly Poles) and Uniate (Belarusians). The latter, constituting the decisive majority of the population in this area before the partitions of Poland, during Catherine the Great's policy of destroying the Union, under strong pressure from the authorities and the Orthodox clergy, were incorporated into the church prevailing in Russia. Since then, Orthodoxy has again become the dominant religion in these areas. This is evidenced by the establishment of the Orthodox Diocese of Minsk. A significant number of Jews adhering to Judaism were present, both in towns and in the countryside. In the second half of the 19th century, especially after the January Uprising, the Roman Catholic community in Belarus was greatly reduced. As a result, the Latin Catholics, who in the first half of the 19th century ranked second among the denominations in the Minsk Governorate, found themselves in the third place in the second half of the century, after the adherents of Orthodoxy and the Jewish religion. In the 1860s, the Catholic population in the Minsk diocese was just over 200,000. Experiencing losses in the following decades, by around 1900, they constituted only 3% of the population of the Minsk Governorate.

== Reorganization of the structure of the Latin Church of Poland in the Russian Empire ==
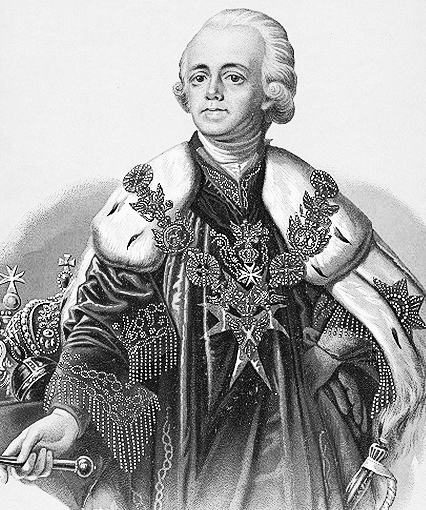
Paul I

After the death of Catherine the Great and the ascension of Tsar Paul I to the throne of the Russian Empire, there was a final and lasting organization of the structures of the Catholic Church. Paul I's attitude toward Catholics and the papacy differed from the policy pursued by his mother, Catherine the Great, but in priority matters, the new tsar did not deviate from the previous assumptions of the empress' church policy. The church in Russia was to continue functioning without being subject to any external influences. Due to the general international situation (Napoleon's occupation of the Papal States), the Roman Curia was inclined to make concessions regarding the Catholic Church in Russia.

Paul I made a friendly gesture by promising to settle church matters in Russia in agreement with Rome. Negotiations were resumed, which had begun towards the end of Catherine the Great's life. An agreement was also reached regarding the sending of a representative of the Holy See to St. Petersburg, Lorenzo Litta, but not in the capacity of an official nuncio. After Litta's arrival in Russia in mid-1797, negotiations on behalf of the emperor were conducted by Chancellor Alexander Bezborodko. Litta failed to push through the Holy See's project regarding the reorganization of the church in Russia. This project envisaged the restoration of the former Latin dioceses before the First Partition of Poland (with the exception of Smolensk), granting bishops the freedom to exercise legitimate jurisdiction, changing the hierarchy, modifying the division of dioceses with the Pope's consent according to canonical rules and in accordance with the spiritual needs of the faithful, returning properties confiscated by Catherine the Great to bishops, chapters, and seminaries, as well as preserving all orders according to their rules, spirit, and discipline.

After nearly a year of negotiations, the new hierarchical structure of the Catholic Church in the Russian Empire was regulated by Paul I's decree of 28 April 1798:

Regarding the Establishment in Russia of Six Dioceses for Those Professing the Roman Faith; on the Maintenance of the Archbishop, Bishops, and their Judicial Vicars and General Officials; on Submitting Matters from the Consistories for Appeal; on the Dependence of Ranks and Ecclesiastical Positions, as well as Seminaries and Schools, on the Archpriests; on the Prohibition of Accepting or Placing Foreign Clergy; on the Appointment of the Archbishop of Mogilev as Metropolitan; on his Residency and on his not Maintaining Contacts with Foreign States without the Permission of the Highest Authority.

By this decree, in the Russian Empire, based on the former organizational structure of the Roman Catholic Church from the times of the Polish–Lithuanian Commonwealth, a new Latin territorial organization was established. The new ecclesiastical province of Mogilev, encompassing the entire Russian Empire within its borders, consisted of the Archdiocese of Mogilev, with the metropolitan seat in Mogilev on the Dnieper river, which included 6 suffragan dioceses. These were the dioceses of Vilnius, Samogitia, Lutsk and Zhytomyr (dioceses canonically united by the person of the bishop), Kamianets-Podilskyi, and Minsk. The dioceses of Zhytomyr and Minsk were new dioceses, established in 1798, and the dioceses of Inflanty and Kyiv were abolished that year (the Smolensk diocese was abolished in 1783 at the time of the establishment of the Mogilev archdiocese). Nuncio Litta was faced with a fait accompli. Realizing the difficulty of the situation, for the good of the Catholic Church in the Romanov Empire, he gave canonical sanction to the decree, announcing 10 decrees on 29 July 1798.

== Establishment of the Diocese of Minsk ==
The project to establish the Diocese of Minsk was proposed even during the time of the Polish–Lithuanian Commonwealth. It emerged in the first half of the 17th century and was included in a private project from 1631 by Franciscan Wojciech Dębołęcki. Presented in the form of a short memorandum along with an attached map to the Congregation for the Propagation of the Faith, Dębołęcki's proposal aimed, among other reasons, to address the vastness of the Polish dioceses by creating twelve new ones. Their seats were to be in places such as Minsk in Lithuania, Grodno, Piotrków Trybunalski, Warsaw, Lublin, and so forth. This project was discussed within the Congregation for the Propagation of the Faith. However, due to numerous anticipated difficulties (including economic ones and the necessity of increasing the number of seats in the Senate), it had little chance of being realized.

=== Paul I ukase of 28 April 1798 ===
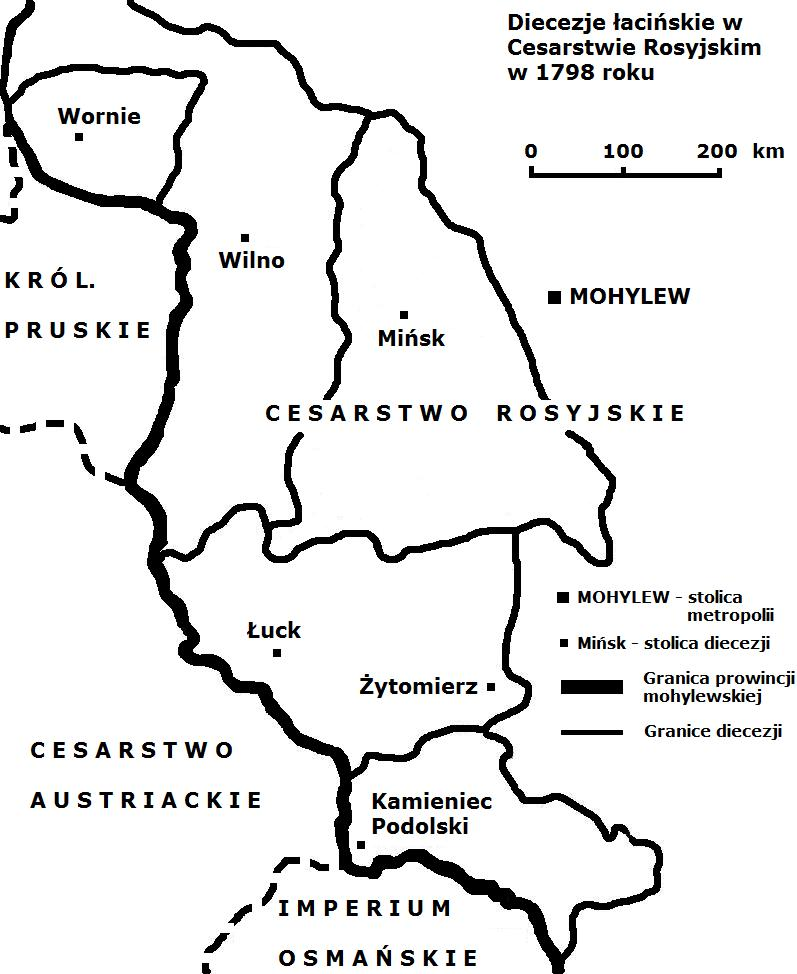
Latin dioceses in the Russian Empire established by Paul I's 1798 ukase

According to Paul I's ukase dated 8 April 1798, the Minsk diocese was erected as follows:

In the All-Russian Empire, for the adherents of the mentioned faith [Roman Catholic], there shall be six dioceses. The Diocese of Minsk in the Governorate of the same name. [Prelate Jakub Dederko was appointed bishop] in Minsk, for whom 6,000 rubles from the Treasury, designated for the support of other religious denominations' clergy in the state, were allocated for his maintenance along with houses and cathedrals.

In accordance with Paul I's ukase, the Diocese of Minsk was formed within the borders of the Minsk Governorate. To the south, the Minsk diocese bordered the dioceses of Lutsk and Zhytomyr, to the east and north with the Archdiocese of Mogilev, and to the west with Vilnius and Lutsk.

=== Approval of the diocese of Minsk by the Holy See ===
On 29 July 1798, the nuncio Lorenzo Litta proclaimed 10 acts, granting canonical sanction to the decree of 28 April 1798. The decree In omnes agri Dominici partes concerned the establishment of the Minsk diocese. Pope Pius VI proposed that from the part separated from the Vilnius diocese, we shape a new diocese in his Apostolic name and authority. The choice of Minsk as the future diocesan seat was justified by the fact that the city housed many churches: the Jesuit church of the Name of Mary, the parish church, churches belonging to the Dominicans, Franciscans, Carmelites, Benedictines, Bernardines, Brothers Hospitallers, Brothers of Saint Roch, Benedictine nuns, and Franciscan nuns. From the perspective of the Russian authorities, Minsk was chosen as the seat of the newly created diocese because it was the capital of the Governorate – the seat of civil authorities, and it was designated as the bishop's residence for easier communication with local civil magistrates. The Jesuit church of the Name of Mary was designated as the cathedral.

On 15 November 1798, Litta's directives gained the sanction of Pope Pius VI in the bull Maximus undique pressi calamitatibus. Essentially, the Minsk diocese was formed from the territory of the Vilnius diocese. Out of the 94 parishes (excluding the parish at the Minsk cathedral) that comprised the Minsk diocese in 1798, 90 (95.7%) were parishes belonging to the Vilnius diocese before 1772: Byerazino, Błoń, Bobownia, Babruysk, Barysaw, Budslaw, Chołchła, Khalopyenichy, Haromites, Khatayevichy, Khazhova, Cimkavici, Davyd-Haradok, Dokshytsy, Dawhinava, Druya, Dubrava, Dunilavichy, Dziedziłowicze, Dzisna, Hlybokaye, Hajno (or Stajno), Hlusk, Haradzishcha, Ikazn, Ilya, Ivyanyets, Koydanava, Kamien, Kiemierzów, Kimbarówka (or Sambora), Klyetsk, Kapyl, Korzen, Kasyanevychi, Krasnaye, Kryvichy, Kuranets, Lyakhavichy, Lyebyedzyeva, Lakhva, Lahishyn, Lahoysk, Luzhki, Myadzyel, Mikołajewicze, Minsk (parish of the Holy Trinity), Miory, Maladzyechna, Mazyr, Miedzwiedziczys, Nyasvizh, Alkovichi, Parafianava, Pyetrykaw, Parshayi, Novy Pagost, Pastavy, Prazaroki, Radashkovichy, Rakaw, Rechytsa, Serafin, Slutsk, Spas, Aksyabr, Stowbtsy, Smilavichy, Nowy Sverjan, Udzela, Uzda, Valkalata, Wolma (or Starzyny), Zadarozhe, Zadziejewe, Zamoście (or Zamostaje), Zaslawye, Zembin. Additionally, during the period from 1772 to 1798, new parishes were established within the Vilnius diocese, such as Haradok, Chervyen, Kapatkyevichy, Luchey, Mosar, Akalava, Rubyazhevichi, Svislach. In addition to the mentioned parishes, the Minsk diocese also included 59 filial churches and 119 chapels that were previously part of the Vilnius diocese. From the Luck diocese, two parishes: Liubeshiv and Pinsk (along with 2 filial churches and 1 chapel) were also incorporated into the Minsk diocese. Additionally, two parishes: Yuravichi and Ostrohladovichi from the Kyiv diocese were annexed. In 1798, the Minsk diocese comprised 95 parishes (including the cathedral parish), 61 filial churches, and 120 chapels.

Within the ecclesiastical province of Mogilev, the Minsk diocese ranked third in terms of territorial size among the Roman Catholic dioceses in the Russian Empire. It was smaller in territory than the largest Mogilev archdiocese and the Vilnius diocese but surpassed two other dioceses, Kamyenyets and particularly Samogitia, by almost fivefold.

== Changes to the boundaries of the diocese in 1847 ==
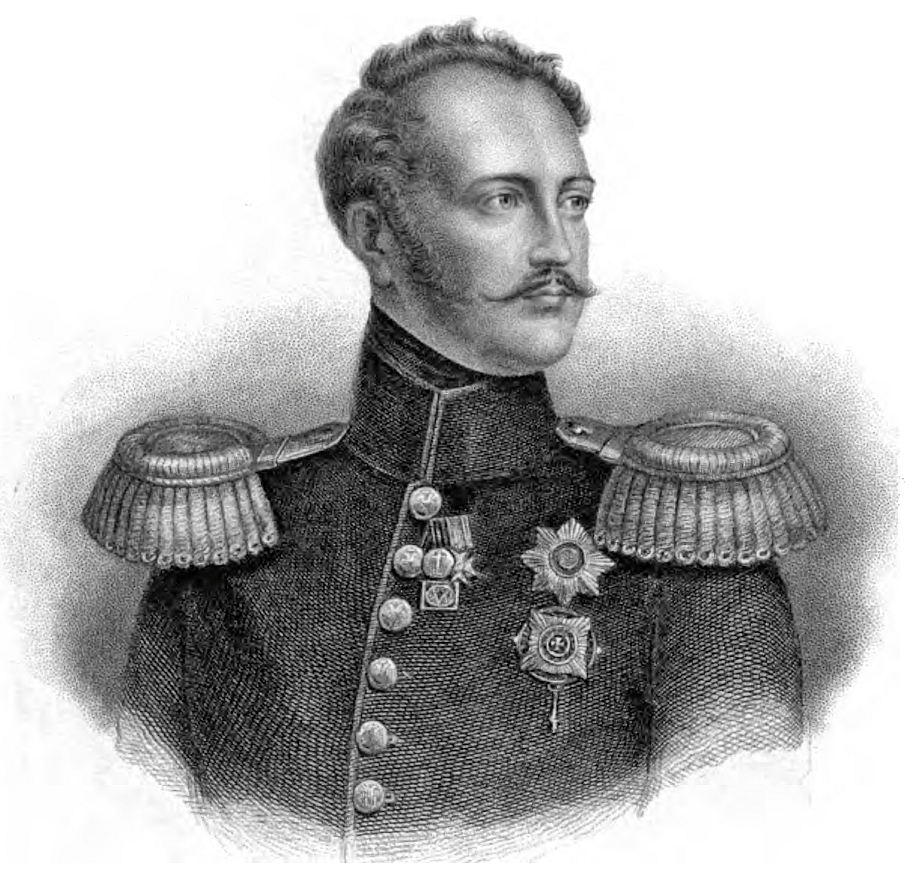
Nicholas I

The stabilization of the diocesan system of the Catholic Church in Russia lasted half a century. In 1845, Tsar Nicholas I visited Rome. Relations with the Apostolic See had been deteriorating since the November Uprising, which was followed by the dissolution of monasteries in the Russian western provinces in 1832. In 1839, the Ruthenian Uniate Church in the Russian Empire was reunited to the Orthodox Church after the Synod of Polotsk. From 1841 to 1844, secularization and confiscation of church properties took place. From 1842 to 1843, an administrative reform was carried out in the Russian Empire. The borders of the Minsk Governorate were modified. Two counties – Vilnius and Dzisna – were transferred from the Vilnius Governorate to the Minsk one, while the Novogrudok District was moved from the Vilnius Governorate to the Minsk one. This change in borders entailed a change in the ecclesiastical boundaries of all dioceses, including the Minsk diocese.

Tsar Nicholas I's audience with the Pope in December 1845 indicated the tsar's clear intention to improve relations with the papacy. Both the "gendarme of Europe" and the Pope hoped for this meeting. The Pope felt threatened by the revolutionary Risorgimento movement in Italy, so he was forced to seek allies. The Tsar, on the other hand, aimed to demonstrate to Europe that Russia was a country where the principles of religious tolerance were present. All the aforementioned issues led to negotiations, during which matters concerning the Catholic Church in Russia were discussed comprehensively, including the issue of the Union Church. The question of delimiting dioceses in the Russian Empire was the subject of four out of twenty-five conferences held between 1 March 1847 and the final closure of negotiations on 3 August 1847. The Russian government, presenting new delimitations of dioceses, expected a quick resolution of the matter. They only wanted to adjust the diocesan boundaries in the empire to the new Governorate borders resulting from the reorganization in 1842 and to create a new Roman Catholic diocese in the south, seeing it as an opportunity to weaken Polish influence.

The papal side feared that future changes in administrative borders would once again necessitate modifications to the administrative structure of the Roman Catholic Church. It pointed out that canon law opposed such dependence. The existing organizational structure of the Latin Church in Russia had a relatively young history, dating back just half a century. Rome wanted to have a list of all parishes and other churches for each future diocese, to be included in the boundary bull or at least in the implementing decrees. Lorenzo Litta did not do this in 1798, which made it difficult for Rome to react quickly to the injustices of the tsarist regime towards the Catholic Church. The matter of the Latin dioceses in the empire was finally settled during the tenth session on 7 January 1847.

As a result of the concordat signed between the Holy See and Russia on 3 August 1847, the former organizational structure of the Latin Church in the Russian Empire, where six Roman Catholic dioceses functioned, was changed to seven with the erection of the Diocese of Tiraspol. The fourth point of the first article of the concordat stated that the Minsk diocese covered the Minsk Governorate in its current borders. The second article noted that the extent and boundaries of the diocese would be determined in the boundary bull. The implementing decrees would contain the number and names of parishes in each diocese in the Russian Empire. They would be submitted for approval to the Holy See.

The implementation of the boundary bull of Pope Pius IX, Universalis Ecclesiae Cura, dated 3 August 1848, was delayed due to obstacles raised by the Russian government. The reorganization of dioceses took place between 1849 and 1854. The Apostolic See appointed Ignacy Hołowiński, coadjutor of Mogilev, as the executor of the bull. In 1852, after the death of Archbishop Kazimierz Dmochowski, Hołowiński became the Metropolitan of Mogilev. Bishop Wacław Żyliński of Vilnius was appointed to assist him. He, on behalf of Hołowiński, carried out the delimitation of the Minsk, Vilnius, and Samogitia dioceses. The list of parishes of the Minsk diocese was finally presented in 1855.

After the withdrawal of the Vilnius and Dzisna deaneries to the Vilnius diocese and the incorporation of the Novogrudok and Stovolovichi deaneries, previously within the boundaries of the Vilnius diocese, into the Minsk diocese, the area of the Minsk diocese increased by approximately 737 km^{2}. After the border changes, its area was 91,212 km^{2}. As a result of these changes, the Minsk diocese, in terms of area, advanced to the second place in the Mogilev ecclesiastical province, ahead of the Vilnius diocese (80,845 km^{2}). In these boundaries, it functioned until 1869 when it was abolished by imperial decree.

== Diocesan authorities ==
=== Diocesan bishops ===
For almost 70 years of its existence, the Minsk diocese was led by diocesan bishops only three times: from 1798 to 1816, 1831 to 1839, and 1853 to 1869. They collectively governed for only 42 years. The first bishop of the diocese was Jakub Ignacy Dederko (1751–1829), the second was Mateusz Lipski (1770?–1839), and the third and final one was Adam Wojtkiewicz (1796–1870). Out of the three diocesan bishops of the Minsk diocese, two – Dederko and Wojtkiewicz – were removed from their office by the tsar's decree.

==== Jakub Ignacy Dederko ====
Jakub Ignacy Dederko served as the bishop of Minsk from 1798 to 1816. He was appointed by the ukase of Paul I on April 28. On 15 November 1798, he was ordained by the suffragan of Mogilev, Jan Benisławski. Upon his solemn entry into Minsk, he began organizing the new diocese. He sought funds for his suffragan, endowed the chapter, designated the income from wealthier parishes for prelates and canons, embellished the cathedral, built a cathedral sacristy, established a consistory, founded the Society of Charity in the capital of his diocese, and converted the Dominican monastery in Minsk into a residence for the bishop of Minsk. In 1810, at the government's behest, he inaugurated the Jesuit academy in Polotsk.

In 1812, the bishop engaged in active patriotic activities. His proclamation of the Confederation of Minsk Citizens on 19 July 1812, his journey to Hlybokaye to pay homage to Emperor Napoleon, and his involvement in the affairs of the Uniate Church drew the wrath of Alexander I upon the bishop. Ignoring the fact that Dederko had been awarded the Orders of St. Anne, 1st class, and St. Vladimir, 2nd class, by the Russian government, the bishop was deprived of his authority over the diocese by the tsar's decree of 16 May 1816 and exiled to Olyka, where he was to reside at the collegiate church. He remained there under the supervision of the bishop of Lutsk for almost 13 years until his death, becoming the first Catholic bishop in Russia in the early 19th century to be deprived of his diocesan governance and sentenced to exile.

==== Mateusz Lipski ====
Mateusz Lipski served as the administrator of the Minsk diocese from 1827 to 1831 and as the bishop of Minsk from 1831 to 1839. He was appointed auxiliary bishop of Polotsk with the title of Aureliopolis in 1823 and consecrated bishop in 1824. In 1827, despite the opposition of the bishop of Lutsk-Zhytomyr, Kacper Kazimierz Cieciszowski, but with the consent of the exiled bishop Dederko, he became the administrator of the Minsk diocese. In 1831, he was appointed bishop of Minsk. He only had his solemn entry in 1833, after the suppression of the November Uprising. Under Lipski's rule, as part of post-uprising repression, 23 out of 35 existing monasteries in the Minsk diocese were abolished, and the Union Church was liquidated in 1839 after the Synod of Polotsk when all the Greek Catholic Bishops joined the Russian Orthodox Church.

==== Adam Wojtkiewicz ====
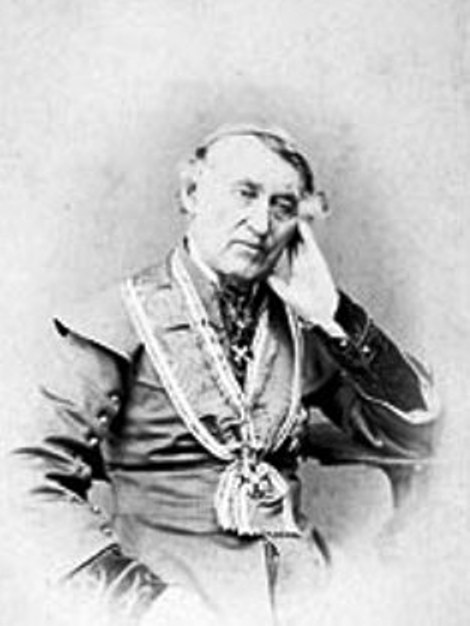
Adam Wojtkiewicz

Adam Wojtkiewicz served as the bishop of Minsk from 1852 to 1869. He was appointed on 18 March 1852. On 23 January 1853, he received episcopal consecration in St. Petersburg. During his tenure, the January Uprising occurred, and following its defeat, on 27 July 1869, the Minsk diocese was abolished and incorporated into the Vilnius diocese as part of the tsarist repression. Wojtkiewicz was summoned to Vilnius by the Governor-General, Alexander Potapov. The bishop's requests to return to Minsk to settle the affairs of the abolished diocese were met with refusal by the Russian authorities. After its abolition, Wojtkiewicz resided in Vilnius and continued his episcopal functions until his death in 1870.

=== Suffragan bishops ===
The Minsk diocese had only one suffragan, even though Paul I's decree of 28 April 1798 established the capital suffraganate in Minsk. Essentially, it was not filled due to lack of funds, and the state, despite commitments made in the Concordat of 1847, had no intention of fulfilling them.

==== Jan Chrzciciel Masclet ====
Jan Chrzciciel Masclet hailed from France. After joining the Franciscan order, he studied in Vilnius, where he received holy orders. He conducted pastoral work in his homeland and, from 1791 onwards, in Russia. In 1798, he became a canon of Mogilev, and in 1809, of Minsk. He served as a parson in Viļaka (Livonia) and as an assessor of the Ecclesiastical College. On 26 September 1814, he was appointed titular bishop of Camachus and suffragan of Minsk through the efforts of Bishop Jakub Dederko, who raised funds for the suffraganate. He received episcopal consecration on 24 June 1817. Presumably, he died around 1836.

=== Administrators ===
During periods when the diocese lacked a diocesan bishop, administrators appointed by the tsarist government resided in Minsk. There is limited information available in literature regarding the biographies of the administrators of the Minsk diocese.

==== Stefan Poźniak ====
Stefan Poźniak served as the parish priest in Wołma in the first half of the 19th century and held the position of cantor canon at Minsk Cathedral. He administered the Minsk diocese from 1816 to 1824 after the deportation of Bishop Jakub Ignacy Dederko.

==== Józef Kamiński ====
In the first half of the 19th century, Józef Kamiński served as the parson in Iwieńce and as a cantor canon at Minsk Cathedral. He was appointed as the administrator of the Minsk diocese in 1824 and served in that capacity until 1827.

==== Paweł Rawa ====
Paweł Rawa was a prelate of Minsk in the first half of the 19th century. From 1839 to 1853, after the death of Bishop Mateusz Lipski, he administered the Minsk diocese. Following the Synod of Polotsk in 1839, Rawa entered into an agreement with the former Uniate bishop, later Orthodox, Antony Zubko. According to this agreement, all Latin rite Catholics whose parents had belonged to the Greek rite since 1798 were to be considered Orthodox. The tsarist government recognized this agreement as a significant achievement, making Paweł Rawa, from the government's perspective, a worthy candidate for the position of Bishop of Minsk. However, he remained a nominee because the Apostolic See was thoroughly informed about the agreement with the Orthodox bishop and did not wish to canonically approve him. During Rawa's administration, there was a suppression of church properties, both monastic and parish.

=== Chapter ===
For the Minsk diocese, according to canon law, a chapter was established. In Minsk, as in other diocesan chapters, the old Polish law of crown chapters initially functioned, which required nobility from candidates. Canons and prelates had to present appropriate documents to it.

The chapter, headed by the bishop, consisted of six prelates and an equal number of canons. The positions of prelates were established in Litta's decree in the following hierarchy: the first place after the bishop was the provost (parson of the Sluck church), the second was the archdeacon (parson of the Borisov church), the third was the dean (parson of the Nesvizh church), the fourth was the scholaster (parson of the Radashkovich church), the fifth was the custos (parson of the Ikaźnie church), and the sixth was the cantor (parson of the Minsk church). Six benefices were allocated for six canons: for the parsons of the churches in Iwieniec, Dokszyce, Czimkowicze, Łachowicze, Niedźwiedzice, and Kleck. The prelates and canons were to reside at the chapter, while vicars were responsible for overseeing their parishes.

Twelve benefices were allocated for the chapter: for Sluck, Borisov, Nesvizh, Radashkovich, Ikaźnie, Minsk, Iwieniec, Dokszyce, Czimkowicze, Łachowicze, Niedźwiedzice, and Kleck. After the death of a benefactor, the bishop added their benefice to the chapter's estate, from which subsequent prelates and canons could benefit, with provisions made for maintaining the parsons of the twelve aforementioned parishes.

Six mansionaries were appointed to serve in the chapter, for whom the following benefices were established: for Hainowicz, Kamieniec, Berezyn, Zadorozhie, Miadziol, Volkolak, Bobruisk, Dunilowicze, and Chozhow. Mansionaries were responsible for caring for the faithful, serving bishops, prelates, and canons, and assisting in reading and singing during cathedral services. The annual salary of mansionaries constituted half of the annual salary of prelates and canons. Mansionaries were not part of the chapter and had no voice during its sessions. After a mansionary's death, the bishop added their benefice to the chapter's estate.

Since the establishment of the Ecclesiastical College in Petersburg in 1801, cathedral chapters were obliged every three years to delegate one prelate or canon as an assessor to the state capital.

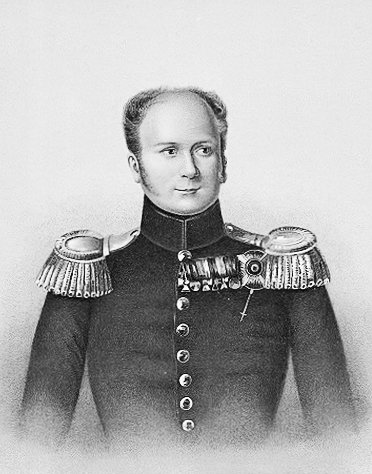
Alexander I

Since the times of Alexander I, the state began to influence the appointment of dignitaries in the chapters of the Russian Empire. From 1810, appointment to a position in the chapter depended on the tsar (confirmed by legislation from 1817). The diocesan bishop compiled a list of nominations for prelatures and canons, submitting it to the Main Office of Foreign Religions. The opinion formed there about the candidates was decisive. The final nomination lay with the tsar.

With the nationalization of ecclesiastical property in Russia, the landed estates of cathedral chapters passed to the state treasury, from which their salaries were determined. By decree of 1 January 1843, bishoprics and chapters were divided into three classes. All cathedral chapters were reduced to six prelatures (prepositure, decanate, archdeaconry, custodia, cantorship, and scholastery) and three gremial canonries (preacher, vice-custodian, senior). The cathedral chapter in Minsk, as well as in Zhytomyr, Lutsk, and Kamianets-Podilskyi, was classified as the third class, as was the bishopric of Minsk. The diocesan bishop received an annual state salary of 4,480 silver rubles, while the suffragan received 2,000 silver rubles. The Minsk chapter received 4,120 silver rubles, of which the prelates received a salary of 200 silver rubles each. Lower salaries were received by gremial canons: the preacher – 150 silver rubles, the vice-custodian and the senior – 125 silver rubles each. Mansionaries received 110 silver rubles each.

Due to the prolonged vacancies in the bishoprics, the selection of the vicar capitular gained particular significance. This led to an increase in his role. The issue of choosing the vicar capitular was a subject of negotiations during the concordat talks in 1847. Russia wanted to include a mention in the concordat about the approval of vicars capitular by the government. The Apostolic See did not agree to this.

=== Consistory ===
To limit the power of the bishops in each diocese of the Russian Empire, there was a consistory, which consisted of an official, vice-official, and three assessors. The consistory also included laypersons: a secretary, chief steward (lower official), registrar, archivist, and curia secretary. The consistory secretary was appointed by the Minister of Internal Affairs and served as a trusted government official. The bishop chose the ecclesiastical participants of the consistory, but had to obtain approval from the Minister of Internal Affairs, through the Ecclesiastical College, for the appointment of the official, vice-official, and assessors. The bishop himself approved the lesser-ranking officials after presenting the candidates to the consistory secretary.

The consistory was allocated 2,500 silver rubles annually. The official received an annual salary of 200 silver rubles, the assessors – 150 silver rubles each, the secretary – 400 silver rubles, the chief steward – 180 silver rubles, the registrar – 130 silver rubles, the curia secretary – 180 silver rubles, while the vice-official and archivist received nothing. In addition to the government-appointed salary, prelates and canons received a lifelong stipend ranging from 500 to 100 silver rubles.

== Deaneries of Minsk diocese ==
=== Borders of deaneries ===
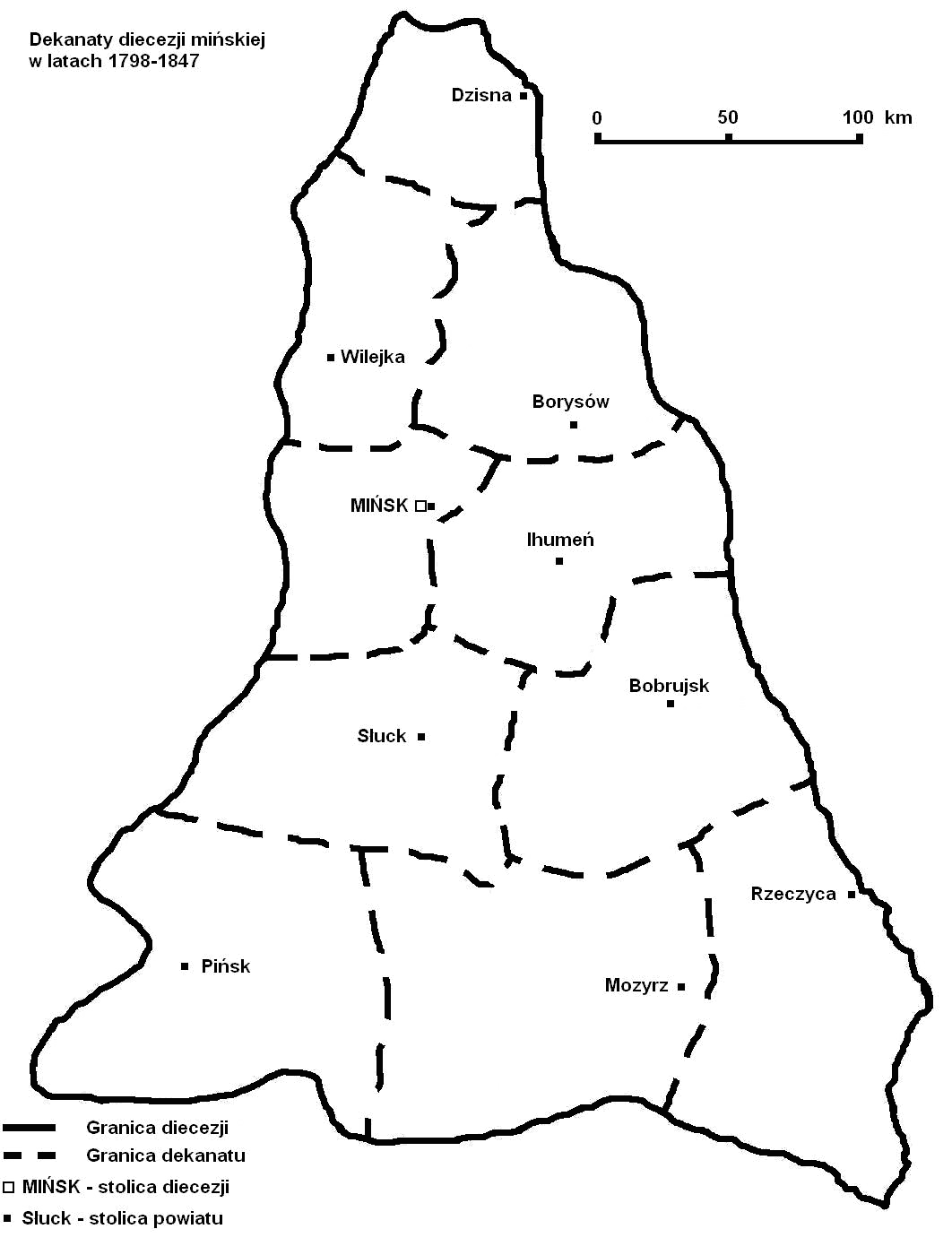
Borders of deaneries of the Minsk diocese from 1798 to 1847

The government decree of 12 July 1796 recommended that the boundaries of deaneries coincide with the boundaries of counties for easier communication with local civil magistrates. Theoretically, Paul I's decree of 28 April 1798 left the creation and delineation of deaneries to the bishops, but in practice, the bishop also had to take into account the decree of 12 July 1796.

The Minsk Governorate, within which the Minsk diocese was closed off, was divided into ten counties: Minsk, Borisovsky, Igumensky, Bobruysky, Slutsky, Pinsky, Mozyrsky, Rechitsa, Dzisna, and Vilna. The boundaries of seven out of ten deaneries completely coincided with the boundaries of the counties. These were the deaneries: Minsk, Borisov, Igumen, Bobruisk, Sluck, Rechitsa, and Dzisna. Exceptions were the Pinsk deanery, covering the Pinsk county and the western part (parishes of Davidgrodek and Lachwa) of the Mozyr county, the Mozyr deanery, reduced by parishes included in the Pinsk deanery, and the Vilna deanery, half of whose territory of the Zadziew parishes was in the Svencionys county in the Vilna Governorate. All deaneries were named after the county seats. In the second year of the Minsk diocese's existence, the Minsk deanery was divided into urban Minsk and Minsk in the county.

From 1842 to 1843, an administrative reform was carried out in the Russian Empire. As a result, the Minsk Governorate changed its boundaries to the north and west. The Dzisna and Vilna counties went to the Vilna Governorate, while from the Vilna Governorate to the Minsk one, the Novogrudok county was annexed, whose boundaries initially included two deaneries: Novogrudok and Stovolovichi. According to the decree of 12 July 1796, after changing the boundaries of the Minsk Governorate, the diocese of the same name had to be adjusted to its boundaries. These changes were canonically approved during the signing of the Concordat with Russia in 1847.

During the period between the administrative reform and the signing of the Concordat, the Neman deanery was established. Sources do not provide the exact date of its establishment. However, it was mentioned in the diocese schematism of 1842. It was carved out of the Minsk deanery in the county and part of the Igumen deanery (Uzda parish). After the establishment of the Neman deanery, there were three deaneries within the Minsk county: urban Minsk, Minsk in the county, and Neman.

In the 1860s, the Mozyr deanery (eastern part) was merged with the Rechitsa deanery. The Mozyr-Rechitsa deanery covered the Rechitsa county and the eastern part of Mozyr (the western fragment belonged to the Pinsk deanery). After the closure of almost all parishes of the Stovolovichi deanery (including Stovolovichi), a deanery named Novogrudok-Stovolovichi was created, covering the boundaries of the county.

=== Changes in the names and number of deaneries ===
In 1798, the Minsk diocese comprised 10 deaneries: Minsk, Borisov, Igumen, Bobruisk, Sluck, Pinsk, Mozyr, Rechitsa, Dzisna, and Vilna. By 1800, the diocese had expanded to 11 deaneries with the addition of the Minsk deanery in the county.

Following the reorganization of the Minsk diocese around 1850, it consisted of 12 deaneries: urban Minsk, Minsk in the county, Neman, Borisov, Igumen, Bobruisk, Sluck, Pinsk, Mozyr, Rechitsa, Novogrudok, and Stovolovichi. The last two, within the Novogrudok county, were transferred to the Minsk diocese from the Vilna diocese. In this composition, the diocese persisted until the collapse of the January Uprising, which led to the closures of churches in the Russian Empire. In 1864, the Stovolovichi deanery was abolished, merging with the Novogrudok deanery. The Mozyr and Rechitsa deaneries were combined into the Mozyr-Rechitsa deanery. This was due to a fire in 1862 that destroyed the church in Rechitsa, the dean's seat, and the closure of the Jurewicze parish in 1866. Previously, the Rechitsa deanery had three parishes, but after the closure of the Jurewicze church, it had only two.

=== Classess of deaneries ===
As a result of the administrative reform in the Russian Empire in 1842, the deaneries of the Minsk diocese were divided into six classes based on their territory. In the first class was the Mozyr-Rechitsa deanery, the largest deanery not only in the Mogilev ecclesiastical province but also in the other ecclesiastical provinces within the former Polish–Lithuanian Commonwealth. The second class included the Bobruisk, Pinsk, Igumen, and Borisov deaneries. The Sluck deanery was classified in the third class. In the fourth class was the Novogrudok-Stovolovichi deanery. The fifth class consisted of two deaneries located in the Minsk county – Neman and Minsk in the county. The third deanery in the Minsk county, Minsk urban, was in the sixth and last class. Around 1842, the average size of a deanery in the Minsk diocese was the largest in the Mogilev ecclesiastical province (within the former Polish–Lithuanian Commonwealth). The largest territorially deaneries were situated in the south and east of the diocese.

Changes in the second half of the 19th century were relatively minor and mainly resulted from the merging of deaneries due to the closure of parish churches.

== Parishes of Minsk diocese ==
=== Parish network in the diocese of Minsk ===
Establishment of the parish	Diocese	Number of parishes
Until 1772	Vilnius	79
Until 1772	Luck	2
Until 1772	Kyiv	2
From 1772 to 1798	Vilnius	11
From 1772 to 1798	Luck	
From 1772 to 1798	Kyiv	
total:		94

Established in 1798 in the territories of the former Polish–Lithuanian Commonwealth under Russian rule, the Minsk diocese comprised 95 parishes. All except four (Lubieszów, Pinsk, Jurewicze, and Ostrohladowicze), as well as the Minsk Cathedral parish, which was established along with the Minsk diocese, belonged to the Vilnius diocese. This parish network had developed in the region over almost four centuries, from the 14th to the end of the 18th century. The greatest expansion of the parish network occurred in the 17th century. However, in the 18th century, the development did not maintain the same pace.

The Minsk diocese consisted of 90 parishes (84.04%), which had belonged to the Vilnius diocese before 1798. Of these, 11 (11.7%) were established during the partitions of the Polish–Lithuanian Commonwealth, while the rest had older origins. Two parishes (2.13%) had belonged to the Luck diocese before 1798, and two (2.13%) to the Kyiv diocese. Parishes annexed from both of these dioceses were established before the partitions as well.

=== Time of creation of the parish ===
The development of the parish network in the Minsk diocese largely concluded before its establishment. The diocese inherited an established parish network from the Vilnius, Luck, and Kyiv dioceses. Within the territory covered by the Minsk diocese from 1798 to 1869, 111 parishes were established.

The parish network in the eastern deaneries, such as Borisovsky, Igumensky, Bobruysky, began to take shape relatively later. The parish network in the northern deaneries (Vilnius, Dziśnieński) stabilized towards the end of the 17th century. The initially vigorous development of parishes in the western (Novogrudok and Stovolovichi) and central (Minsk) deaneries slowed down in the 17th century.

In 1798, a parish was established at the newly founded Minsk Cathedral. In the 19th century, only two parishes were established within the territory of the Minsk diocese – in Hrozów and Hermanowicze. During the period from 1798 to 1847, the Minsk diocese comprised 97 parishes. The administrative reform in the Russian Empire affected the number of parishes in the Minsk diocese, which lost 33 parishes from the Vilnius and Dziśnieński deaneries to the Vilnius diocese. However, it gained only 17 parishes from the Novogrudok and Stovolovichi deaneries, which were previously part of the Vilnius diocese.

=== Filial churches and chapels ===
Chapels in the Borderlands mainly operated at Polish manors, also serving Polish officials. The gentry couldn't afford to build a church, but they could afford a chapel for their own convenience, especially when the parish was far away. Economic factors were also important for long journeys to the parish.

Sources and studies provide different numbers of filial churches and chapels that were part of the Minsk diocese in 1798. Dictionaries and encyclopedias maintain that the diocese had 48 filial churches and 174 chapels. Bolesław Kumor also provides this number. None of the sources mention the names of towns where filial churches and chapels existed in 1798. The earliest information about the number of filial churches and chapels comes from 1802. It is the Collection of Information about the State of the Clergy in the General Diocese of Minsk compiled by the first bishop – J. Dederka. The number of 41 filial churches and chapels, however, does not correspond to the number given in historical studies. J.B. Chodźko provides a certain number of filial churches and chapels in a work dedicated to the Minsk diocese around 1830. He lists 60 filial churches and 132 chapels, also providing towns where filial churches and chapels were located. Out of the parishes of the Minsk diocese that existed in 1830, 33 had filial churches, and 50 had chapels.

After the change of borders of the Minsk diocese in 1847, the number of filial churches increased to 62, while the number of chapels decreased threefold, which was caused by the loss of the Vileika and Disna deaneries, which had a dense network of chapels. The Vileika deanery had 13 chapels, and the Disna deanery had 18. The Novogrudok deanery, which was annexed to the Minsk diocese, had one chapel in the Mir parish. The second reason for the decrease in the number of chapels was the prohibition of building new churches and chapels or renovating them without permission from civil authorities from 16 December 1839. After the reorganization of the Minsk diocese in the Russian Empire, it had 62 filial churches and 45 chapels. Around 1863, the number of filial churches was 37, and chapels 146. The number of filial churches decreased from 62 (in 1855) to 37, while the number of chapels almost tripled. After the January Uprising, 25 filial churches were taken over by Orthodox churches or demoted to the rank of chapels in the Minsk diocese.

Out of all the filial churches and chapels of the Minsk diocese, only 45 received funds in the form of land and annuities. The total income of filial churches and chapels amounted to 4,250.5 ha of land and 6,802 rubles annuities.

=== Altars and brotherhoods ===
Around 1830, altars were present in churches in 12 parishes: Bobruisk, Dokshitsy, Glubokoe, Ivyanets, Kamien, Kopyl, Lachowicze, Lebedzievo, Minsk (Parish of the Holy Trinity), Slutsk, Shverzhen, and Zadurozhye. In Bobruisk, there were two altars: St. Anthony's and the Scapular of the Blessed Virgin Mary, in Kamien – St. Anne's, in Lebedzievo – the Immaculate Conception of the Blessed Virgin Mary, in Slutsk – two altars: St. Anne's and St. Mary Magdalene's. Sources do not provide information about the patrons of two altars in Glubokoe and two in Ivyanets, as well as the altars in Dokshitsy, Kopyl, Lachowicze, Minsk, Shverzhen, and Zadurozhye. The number of altars around 1830 was 16, of which 14 had funds. The total capital amounted to 19,675 silver rubles, 997.9 ha of land, and 183 souls of serfs. In 1855, there was only one altar in the Minsk diocese – in the Koroleszczewicze parish, established after 1830. There is no data on its funds.

Around 1830, 34 brotherhoods were active in the Minsk diocese in the parishes of Cholchla (of the Name of Mary), Khotayevichi (of the Holy Rosary), Khodzhevichi (of the Scapular of the Virgin Mary), Tsimkovichy (of the Scapular of the Virgin Mary), Dolginov (of St. Anne), Druya (of St. Anne and St. Anthony), Dunilovichi (of the Scapular of the Virgin Mary), Glubokoe (of the Holy Trinity), Hermanovichi (of the Transfiguration of the Lord), Ikazn (of the Holy Rosary), Kaydanov (of St. Anne), Kamien (of the Immaculate Conception of the Virgin Mary), Koshenevichi (of the Immaculate Conception of the Virgin Mary and Divine Providence), Krasnoye Selo (of Corpus Christi), Lahoysk (of the Most Sacred Heart of Jesus), Myadel (of St. Anne), Minsk – Parish of the Holy Trinity ("Happy Death"), Mir (of the Holy Rosary), Molodechno (of Jesus of Nazareth), Niedzwiedzice (of the Holy Rosary), Nesvizh (of the Immaculate Conception of the Virgin Mary and the Holy Rosary), Okolovo (of Divine Providence), Parafyanovo (of the Holy Rosary), Pierzhaye (of the Scapular of the Virgin Mary), Pinsk (of the Holy Rosary), Postavy (of the Scapular of the Virgin Mary), Rakov (of the Holy Rosary), Slutsk (of the Holy Rosary and the Scapular of the Virgin Mary), Volkolata (of Divine Providence), and Zadziev (of the Holy Trinity). Only the Brotherhood of the Happy Death in the Minsk Parish of the Holy Trinity had an annual income of one silver ruble and five kopecks. Brotherhoods were sustained by organizing parish festivities and faithful donations. In 1855, there were no brotherhoods in the Minsk diocese.

=== Parish endowments ===
Parish endowments consisted of land, capital, annuities, and serfs. In 1830, the rectors of the Minsk diocese collectively owned 153,538.7 ha of land, 564,439 silver rubles in capital, 15,884 silver rubles in annuities, and 4,352 serfs. On average, each parish church was allocated: 1,583 ha of land, 5,819 silver rubles in capital, 164 silver rubles in annuities, and 44 serfs.

On 1 January 1842, a new regulation concerning Roman Catholic dioceses in the Russian Empire was issued. Church estates were confiscated. The sums obtained from the confiscation of church property were managed by the Roman Catholic College in St. Petersburg, which, with the permission of the Minister of Internal Affairs, paid salaries to the clergy. Parishes were divided into five classes.

Parsons of first-class parishes received 600 silver rubles annually. In the Minsk diocese, this privilege was held only by the pastor of Minsk Cathedral. Pastors of second-class parishes received 500 silver rubles annually. There were 16 parishes assigned to the third class with an annual salary of 400 silver rubles. There were 31 fourth-class parishes, where parsons received 275 silver rubles annually. 38 parishes belonged to the fifth class, and their parsons received an annual salary of 230 silver rubles. These were parishes in smaller towns and villages. Sources do not provide information on the classification of 15 parishes from the Novogrudok and Stolovichi deaneries. In addition to the annual salaries for each rector, 43.7 ha of land were allocated.

=== Number of faithful and priests in the parishes of the Diocese of Minsk ===
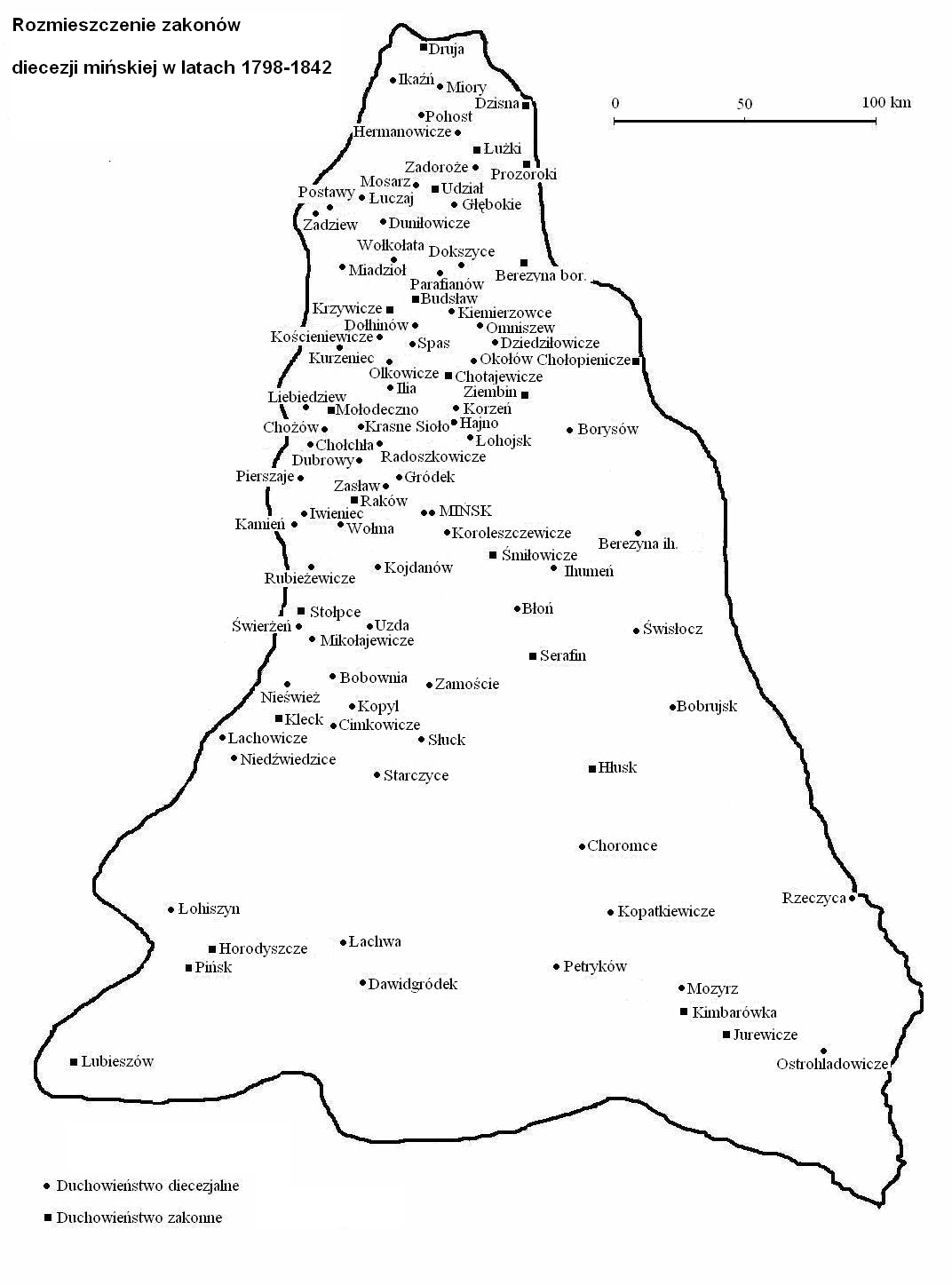
Distribution of Latin monasteries in the diocese of Minsk between 1798 and 1842

Sources do not provide the number of priests in the Minsk diocese in 1798. Around 1830, there were 213 priests in the Minsk diocese. On average, two priests served one parish. One priest was responsible for 1,274 faithful. Around 1865, there were 162 priests in the Minsk diocese, with two priests per parish, and one priest overseeing 1,497 faithful. The number of priests sharply decreased after the January Uprising due to many of them being deported to Siberia or being removed by the authorities from parish administration.

In 1800, there were 199,597 faithful in the Minsk diocese. With 95 parishes, there was an average of 2,101 Roman Catholics per parish. In 1842, the number of parishes was 97, with 271,559 faithful. On average, there were 2,800 Catholics per parish. Due to the change in the boundaries of the Minsk diocese between 1842 and 1847, thirty-three parishes (104,194 faithful) from the Dzisna and Vilnius deaneries were annexed to the Vilnius diocese. Sources do not provide the number of faithful in the newly annexed parishes of the Novogrudok and Stolovichi deaneries around 1842, but around 1863, they totaled 31,317 faithful. Between 1863 and 1869, the number of faithful in the Minsk diocese was 219,353, with 52 parishes. On average, there were 4,218 Catholics per parish.

=== Abolition of parishes of the Diocese of Minsk after the January Uprising ===
According to data from 1863, in the Diocese of Minsk there were 80 parishes, 37 filial churches, and 127 chapels. As a result of repression following the January Uprising, 28 parishes, 21 filial churches, and 79 chapels were abolished.

Such actions by the tsarist regime were caused by several reasons: Catholic priests often opposed the Tsarist government by delivering patriotic sermons during the uprising and cooperating with the insurgents, or parishioners took part in the insurgent fights. As part of the repression, priests were sent to Siberia, abandoned churches were handed over to the Orthodox Church, converted into Orthodox churches. Some churches were temporarily closed if they were not suitable for conversion into an Orthodox church due to high renovation costs, repurposed for secular use (prisons, schools, etc.), or even demolished. They were also closed when parishioners and clergy refused to accept the authorities' decisions, which mandated the introduction of the Russian language into paraliturgical services. In the case of the Diocese of Minsk, this resulted in the closure of over half of the Catholic churches.

== Religious orders in the Diocese of Minsk ==
The pastoral activity of the diocese was supported by religious orders, both male and female. Some of the male orders were entrusted with running parishes. The endowment of the orders consisted of land, annuities, capital, and serfs. In total, the orders of the Diocese of Minsk possessed 87,858.2 ha of land, 646,536 rubles of capital, 10,790 rubles of annuities, and 6,219 serfs.

=== Typology of religious orders in the Diocese of Minsk ===
The religious orders were divided into male and female, with the male orders further categorized into those that administered parishes and those that did not. The area of the diocese most densely populated by religious orders was in the northwest and center of the Minsk Diocese (31 convents). In the southeastern part, there were only six convents, while in the southwestern part, there were eight, and in the eastern part of the diocese, there were five convents.

=== Religious orders running parishes ===
Around 1830, out of the 97 parishes in the Minsk Diocese, 21 were administered by religious orders. The Dominicans managed parishes in Khalopyenichy, Khatayevichy, Drut, Rakav, Rechytsa, Stowbsy, and Ziembin; the Bernardines in Berezyna Borysowska, Budslaw, Hlusk, Jurewicze; the Franciscans in Pinsk, Prozoroki, Serafin, Udział; the Piarists in Lubieszów, Łużki; the Trinitarians in Kryvichy, Maladzyechna; the Benedictines in Horodyszcz; the Missionaries in Śmiłowicze; and the Cistercians in Kimbarówka.

On 17 July 1832, Nicholas I approved the decree abolishing certain Roman Catholic monasteries. These closures were motivated by the desire to eliminate all foreign influences and peculiarities of the orders within the Russian Empire, which engaged in missions and pastoral education. The diversity of Roman Catholic orders was incomprehensible to the tsarist regime, as Orthodox Russia had only one male and one female order before the partitions of the Polish–Lithuanian Commonwealth. The aversion of the tsarist regime towards Latin orders was expressed in the doctrine presented to Nicholas I by Sergey Uvarov, the Minister of Education, which contained three main points defining Russia: Orthodoxy, autocracy, and the noble nationality of Great Russians. J.B. Chodźko, in summarizing his work on the Minsk diocese, presented the official explanation given by the government for the transfer of almost all parishes previously managed by the religious clergy into the hands of secular clergy. These changes were made due to the small number of priests. The dissolution of the orders occurred in two stages: in 1832 and in 1844. Those orders that survived the dissolution in 1832 were divided into official and non-official in 1842. Official orders received government salaries depending on the class of the monastery (from I to III), while non-official orders received annual salaries of 40 rubles per person.

As a result of the dissolution of the orders in 1832, the administration of parishes was taken away from the Bernardines, Dominicans, Franciscans, Piarists, and Missionaries – a total of 16 parishes were removed from the monastic clergy. The Bernardines, Benedictines, Cistercians, Piarists, and Franciscans remained in charge of administering parishes. After 1842, among the parishes incorporated into the diocese from the Novogrudok and Stovolovichi deaneries, only one was administered by a religious order: the Knights of Malta oversaw the parish in Stovolovichi.

=== Male religious orders not running a parish ===
In the Minsk Diocese, there were 18 male monasteries that did not administer any parishes. They were mostly located in the capitals of deaneries and larger cities, where they were served by diocesan clergy.

The Bernardine order had the most monasteries without parishes in the Minsk Diocese. Three out of its five monasteries were dissolved in 1832. The monasteries in Minsk and Nyasvizh survived, and in 1842 (after the confiscation of church property in the Russian Empire), they were classified as Class I official, with an annual pension of 3,185 rubles. The Carmelite order had four monasteries. The Carmelite monasteries in Pinsk, Minsk, and Stary Miadzioł were dissolved in 1832, and the monastery in Hlybokaye was classified as non-official in 1842, meaning the monks received 40 rubles per person annually. Next in terms of the number of monasteries was the Dominican order. The Dominican monastery in Minsk was dissolved in 1832, the monastery in Pinsk was classified as non-official in 1842, and in Nyasvizh, it was classified as Class II with an annual pension of 2,220 rubles. The Benedictines and Franciscans had two monasteries each. After 1832, only the Benedictine monastery in Nyasvizh survived. In 1842, it was classified as Class II (2,220 rubles annually). The only Brothers Hospitallers monastery – in Minsk – was dissolved in 1832. After the dissolution of the orders in the Minsk Diocese in 1832, only 6 male monasteries remained.

=== Female monasteries ===
In the Minsk Diocese, 10 female religious orders were active: Sisters of Charity, Mariavites, Benedictine nuns, Cistercian nuns, Bernardine nuns. The most widespread was the Mariavite order, which survived the dissolution in 1832. In 1842, all Mariavite convents were classified as non-official (40 rubles annually per person). The Bernardine convent in Minsk was also classified as non-official. The Benedictine convent in Nyasvizh was assigned to Class III (1,455 roubles annually), while the Minsk convent was assigned to Class I (2,765 roubles annually). There is no information available about the fate of the Sisters of Charity convent in Minsk.

== Bibliography ==
- Akty i Dokumenty otnosâščiesâ k ustrojstvu i upravleniû Rimsko-Katoličeskoj cerkvi v Rossii (in Belarusian). Vol. 1. Petrograd. 1915.
- Akty i Gramoty o ustrojstve i upravlenii rimsko-katoličeskoj cerkvi v impierii rossijskoj i carstve Polskom (in Belarusian). Sankt-Peterburg. 1849.
- Chodźko, J. B. (1998). Radwan, M. (ed.). Diecezja mińska około 1830 roku (in Polish). Vol. 1, 2. Lublin. ISBN 83-85854-41-X.
- "A pontificatu Clementis PP. XII (1730) usque pontificatum Pii PP. VI (1799)". Hierarchia Catholica Medii et recentioris aevi sive summorum pontificum – S.R.E. Cardinalium Ecclesiarium antistitum series e documentis tabularni praesertim Vaticani (in Latin). Vol. 6. Patavii. 1958.
- "A pontificatu Pii PP. VII (1800) usque pontificatum Gregorii PP. XVI (1846)". Hierarchia Catholica Medii et recentioris aevi sive summorum pontificum – S.R.E. Cardinalium Ecclesiarium antistitum series e documentis tabularni praesertim Vaticani (in Latin). Vol. 7. Patavii. 1968.
- Skarbek, J. (2000). Źródła do dziejów rozgraniczenia diecezji łacińskich w Cesarstwie Rosyjskim w połowie XIX wieku. Diecezja kamieniecka. Diecezja łucko-żytomierska (in Polish). Vol. 1. Lublin. ISBN 83-85854-51-7.
- Boudou, A. (1928). Stolica Święta a Rosja. Stosunki dyplomatyczne między niemi w XIX stuleciu (in Polish). Vol. 1. Kraków.
- Boudou, A. (1930). Stolica Święta a Rosja. Stosunki dyplomatyczne między niemi w XIX stuleciu (in Polish). Vol. 2. Kraków.
- Gach, P. (1984). Kasaty zakonów na ziemiach dawnej Rzeczypospolitej i Śląska 1773-1914 (in Polish). Lublin. ISBN 83-00-00294-4.
- Rogier, L. J.; de Bertier de Sauvigny, G.; Hajjar, J., eds. (1987). Historia Kościoła (in Polish). Vol. 4. Warsaw. ISBN 83-211-0849-0.
- Kumor, Bolesław (1970). "Granice metropolii i diecezji polskich (966-1939)" [Borders of Polish metropolises and dioceses (966-1939)]. Archiwa, Biblioteki i Muzea Kościelne (in Polish). 20 (2). Katolicki Uniwersytet Lubelski Jana Pawła II: 253–374. doi:10.31743/abmk.6632.
- Kumor, B. (1980). Ustrój i organizacja Kościoła polskiego w okresie niewoli narodowej (1772-1918) (in Polish). Kraków.
- Loret, M. (1910). Kościół katolicki a Katarzyna II. 1772-1784 (in Polish). Kraków, Warsaw.
- Loret, M. (1928). Kościół Katolicki w zaborze rosyjskim za panowania Pawła I (in Polish). Kraków.
- Mościcki, H. (1910). Dzieje porozbiorowe Litwy i Rusi (in Polish). Vilnius.
- Wasilewski, J. (1931). Arcybiskupi i administratorowie archidiecezji mohylewskiej (in Polish). Pinsk.
- Sułkowski, W. (1889). Kartka z dziejów Kościoła katolickiego w Rosyi. Biskupstwo mińskie (in Polish). Vol. 1. Kraków.
- Żytkowicz, L. (1928). Rządy Repnina na Litwie w latach 1794-1797 (in Polish). Vilnius.
- Nowodworski, M. (1881). "Mińska dyecezya". Encyklopedja kościelna. Podług teologicznej encyklopedji Wetzera i Weltego, z licznemi jej dopełnieniami (in Polish). Vol. 14. Warsaw.
- Chełmiński, Z. (1911). "Mińska dyecezya". Podręczna Encyklopedia Kościelna (in Polish). Vol. 25–26. Warsaw.
- Nitecki, P. (2000). Biskupi Kościoła w Polsce. Słownik biograficzny (in Polish). Warsaw. ISBN 83-7012-050-4.
- Sulimierski, F.; Chlebowski, B.; Walewski, W., eds. (1885). "Mińska dyecezya". Słownik Geograficzny Królestwa Polskiego i innych krajów słowiańskich (in Polish). Vol. 6. Warsaw.
