= Volok (unit) =

Medieval land unit

Volok (Lithuanian: valakas, Polish: włóka, Belarusian: валока, Russian: волока) was a late medieval unit of land measurement in the Grand Duchy of Lithuania, Kingdom of Poland and later, the Polish–Lithuanian Commonwealth. It was equal, on average, to 21.368 hectares (52.80 acres) in Lithuania or to 17.955 hectares (44.37 acres) in Poland. It was subdivided into 30 or 33 morgens.

Volok was also a unit that determined taxation and other duties to the state. Previously, taxes and duties were based on the number of households (see, for example, 1528 census of the Grand Duchy of Lithuania that recorded households as a measure of military duty) or number of horses/bulls needed to work the land. Such system was not exact: households varied greatly in size and in wealth. Therefore, the introduction of voloks marked an important transition to taxes based on area (width times length).

In Lithuania, it was introduced during the Volok Reform that began in 1547. Officially, voloks were abandoned as a unit after the emancipation reform of 1861, but survived in everyday use until the introduction of the metric system in 1921.
