= Mečislovas Leonardas Paliulionis =

Roman Catholic bishop (1834–1908)

- Bishop of Samogitia
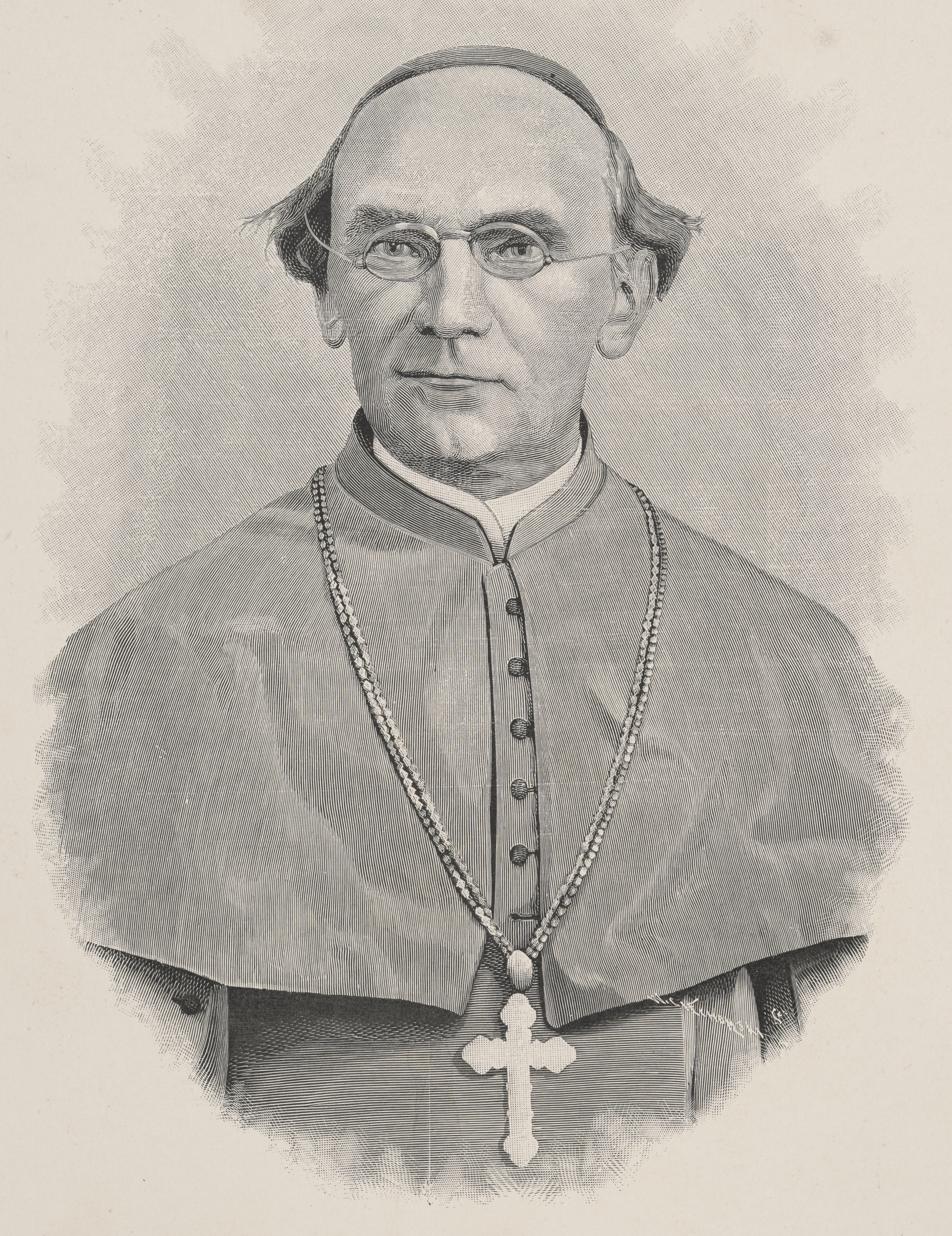
- Sketch of Paliulionis, drawn c. 1901
- Appointed: 15 March 1883
- Predecessor: Motiejus Valančius
- Successor: Gasparas Cirtautas

Orders
- Ordination: 27 February 1860
- Consecration: 3 June 1883 by Szymon Marcin Kozłowski

Personal details
- Born: 2 December 1834 Smilgiai parish, Russian Empire
- Died: 15 May 1908 (aged 73) Kaunas, Russian Empire
- Buried: Kaunas Cathedral
- Education: Saint Petersburg Roman Catholic Theological Academy

Ordination history
History
Episcopal consecration
- Principal consecrator: Szymon Marcin Kozłowski
- Co-consecrators: Kazimierz Józef Wnorowski, Józef Hollak
Episcopal succession
Bishops consecrated by Mečislovas Leonardas Paliulionis as principal consecrator
- Stefan Aleksander Zwierowicz: 16 November 1897
- Bolesław Hieronim Kłopotowski: 21 November 1897
- Karol Antoni Niedziałkowski: 5 December 1897
- Kasper Felicjan Cyrtowt: 12 December 1897
- Antanas Karosas: 16 June 1907

Mečislovas Leonardas Paliulionis (Polish: Mieczysław Leonard Pallulon; 2 December 1834 – 15 May 1908) was a Roman Catholic bishop of the Diocese of Samogitia from 1883 until his death in 1908.

Paliulionis studied at the Varniai Priest Seminary and the Saint Petersburg Roman Catholic Theological Academy. After graduation in 1860, he taught dogmatic theology at the Varniai Priest Seminary (which was moved to Kaunas in 1863) until his consecration as bishop of Samogitia in 1883. Paliulionis worked to improve the education of priests, prioritizing practical work among the congregation, including delivering sermons and teaching children basic catechism. He also worked to improve the interior of the Church of St. Peter and St. Paul in Kaunas, which was elevated to cathedral status in 1895. He invited Juozas Naujalis to become the church's organist and sponsored his specialized education in Germany.

In the age of rising tension between the Lithuanian National Revival and Polish nationalism, Paliulionis generally supported both Polish and Lithuanian activities, but only as much as they were useful in his Catholic mission. Given this and his discrete opposition to the National Revival, he was criticized by both Polish and Lithuanian activists. Nevertheless, Paliulionis supported Lithuanian-language Catholic press. He opposed the Lithuanian press ban and supported Lithuanian book smugglers. When the press ban was lifted, he supported the Society of Saint Casimir that published Lithuanian books and periodicals and the Saulė Society that organized and maintained Lithuanian-language schools.

== Biography ==
=== Early life and education ===
Paliulionis was born in 1834. His exact date of birth varies by source, but is recorded as 2 December [O.S. 19 November] in the registry of clerics at the Varniai Priest Seminary. He was born in the Smilgiai parish near Panevėžys; the exact location of his birth is unknown. His family likely were freed serfs who rented a manor or a folwark from the Karp family. He attended a school for Panevėžys nobility (present-day Juozas Balčikonis Gymnasium) and survived a purge of students in 1850 who could not produce proper documentation of their nobility status. He graduated in 1852.

Paliulionis studied at the Varniai Priest Seminary and the Saint Petersburg Roman Catholic Theological Academy. He graduated and was ordained a priest in 1860. After his ordination, he returned to the seminary to teach dogmatic theology. After the Uprising of 1863, the seminary and seat of the Diocese of Samogitia was moved from Varniai to Kaunas, so that the Tsarist police could monitor its activities more closely. Paliulionis relocated as well and continued to teach at the seminary. At the same time, he was also a chaplain of the Kaunas Girls' Gymnasium.

=== Bishop ===
==== Religious affairs ====
Paliulionis became canon of the Samogitian cathedral chapter in 1875 and procurator of the seminary in 1880. Paliulionis was appointed bishop of Samogitia on 15 March 1883, in the hopes that he would be loyal to Russia. He was consecrated on 3 June [O.S. 22 May] 1883 by Szymon Marcin Kozłowski (bishop of Lutsk and Zytomierz), assisted by Kazimierz Józef Wnorowski (bishop of Lublin) and Józef Hollak (titular bishop of Arad).

Paliulionis worked to improve the education of priests. He extended the seminary's course to five years for those who had completed only a basic four-class education. He prioritized practical work among his congregation, including delivering sermons and teaching children basic catechism. To achieve this, he introduced a class on catechesis at the seminary and tasked Kazimieras Jaunius with preparing a short textbook on the subject. He viewed priests' interests that did not directly serve Catholicism as weakness to be avoided – for example, he did not approve the poetry authored by Maironis, the philological studies of Kazimieras Jaunius, or the mathematical interests of Antanas Baranauskas. In July 1907, he issued an instruction to organize priestly congresses in each deanery, hoping to foster greater clergical involvement in church and social affairs.

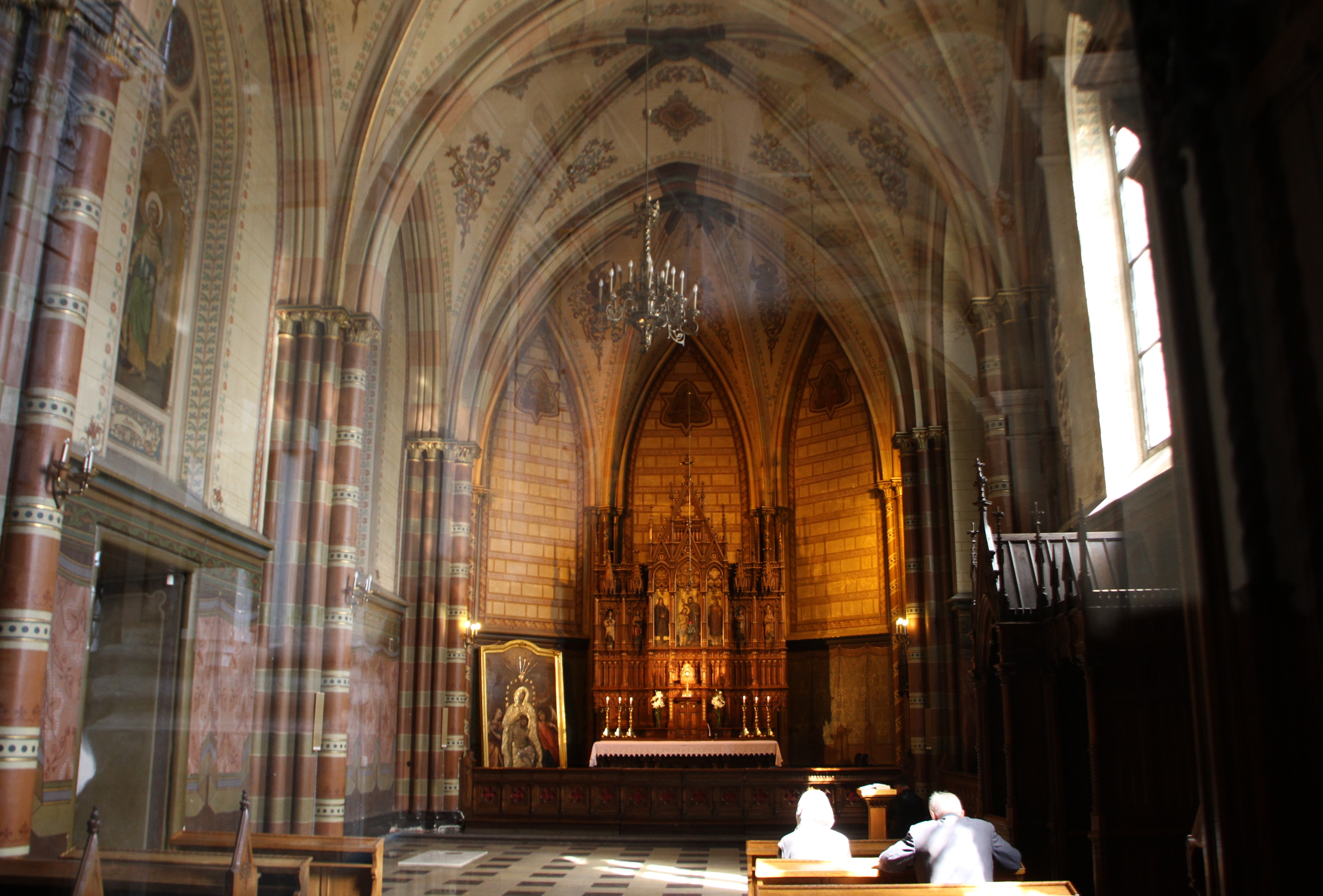
The Chapel of the Blessed Sacrament, added to Kaunas Cathedral during Paliulionis' tenure as bishop of Samogitia.

Paliulionis had to combat various Russification policies from the tsarist government, which promoted the Eastern Orthodox Church and suppressed the Roman Catholic Church. One such policy forced school students to pray for the Tsar in Eastern Orthodox churches. In 1884, Paliulionis ordered Catholic students to pray only in Catholic churches. This led to a large fine (50,000 rubles, according to Aleksandras Dambrauskas-Jakštas) but his order prevailed. According to the memoirs of Juozapas Stakauskas, Paliulionis expected to be exiled by the Tsarist authorities at any time and had a bag with necessities ready to go.

Paliulionis worked to improve the interior of the Church of St. Peter and St. Paul in Kaunas, the new seat of the Diocese of Samogitia that was officially elevated to cathedral status in 1895. During this time, the church acquired ten altar paintings by Michał Elwiro Andriolli and the central nave was decorated with a cycle of wall paintings related to the apostles Peter and Paul by Jan Czesław Moniuszko and Jan Czajewicz. Paliulionis planned a thorough reconstruction, led by architect Florian Wyganowski, that would turn the church into a neo-Gothic cathedral with two 113-metre (371 ft) high towers. However, due to lack of funding, only the neo-Gothic Chapel of the Blessed Sacrament was built, sponsored by count Jonas Przeździecki. Paliulionis invited Juozas Naujalis to become the church's organist and financed his education at the Regensburg Church Music School in Germany. Paliulionis also supported courses for organ players and their new school in Kaunas established by Naujalis.

==== Lithuanian National Revival ====
During Paliulionis' tenure, there were rising tensions between the Lithuanian National Revival and Polish national movements. Unlike his predecessor, Paliulionis chose to publicly prioritize his Catholic identity, supporting both Polish and Lithuanian activities as long as they were useful in his Catholic mission. For this attribute, Aleksandras Dambrauskas-Jakštas referred to him as a "bishop cosmopolitan", saying, "He was in love only with the dead classical Latin language, and he looked at the living ones only as certain tools, not for raising this or that nationality, but for strengthening Catholicism." For example, Paliulionis advocated for the use of the Lithuanian language in local churches and sought government permission to teach religion at primary schools in Lithuanian (granted in 1905), as that helped him to reach the Lithuanian-speaking population.

Despite his indifference towards language, Paliulionis did not support priests who were active in the Lithuanian National Revival, as he was more drawn to the Polish style of Catholicism. He frequently assigned priests who sympathized with the National Revival to Courland, telling them that they could "spread their Lithuanian ideas [there]", and kept them out of the cathedral chapter, a notable example being Juozas Tumas-Vaižgantas. These anti-Lithuanian policies were used by leftist Lithuanian movements as justification to turn away from supporting Catholicism. Moreover, that same indifference was used by contemporary Polish and Lithuanian press, including the Przegląd Wszechpolski and Šviesa, to accuse him of either being a Lithuanian or a Polish nationalist, respectively.

==== Lithuanian press ====
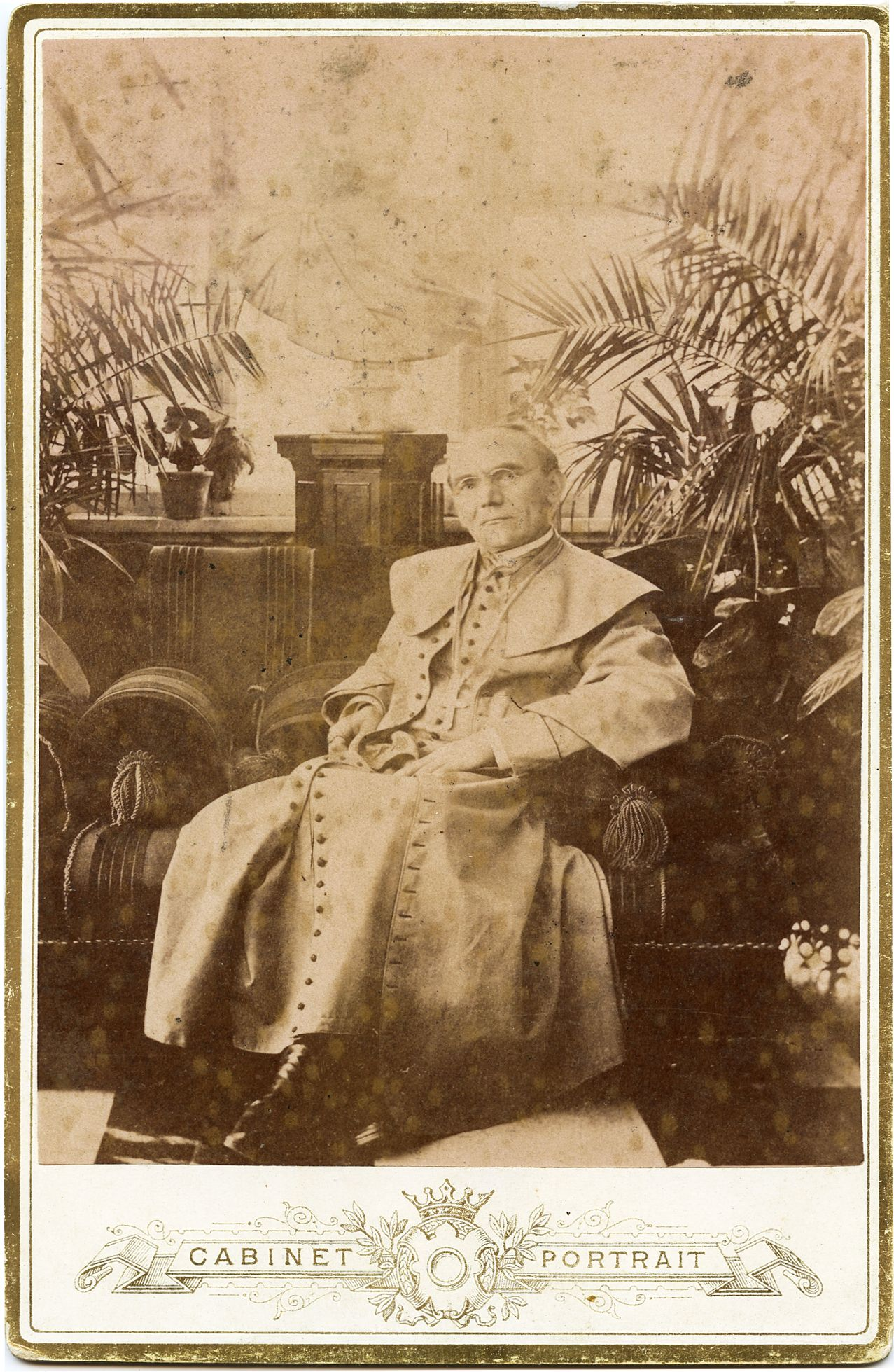
Photo of Paliulionis, taken sometime in the 1890s–1900s

Paliulionis supported Lithuanian-language Catholic press. During the Lithuanian press ban, he opposed government efforts to publish Lithuanian texts in the Cyrillic script and financed the printing of Lithuanian religious texts in East Prussia and their smuggling into Lithuania. For example, he donated 1,000 rubles to priest Martynas Sederevičius so that he could smuggle and distribute Lithuanian prayer books. According to the memoirs of Gabrielė Petkevičaitė-Bitė, Paliulionis supported the staging of the first Lithuanian-language theater play America in the Bathhouse in Palanga in 1899 and even recruited local nobles from the Ogiński and Tyszkiewicz families to attend.

Paliulionis financed the publication of the anonymous Lithuanian-language book Paskutinis pamoksłas wiena żemajcziu kuniga priesz smerti ("The Last Sermon of One Samogitian Priest Before Death") in 1889 (republished in 1895, 1899, and 1905). This work idealized the Polish–Lithuanian Commonwealth and considered Eastern Orthodoxy a threat, but did not question the legitimacy of the Tsarist regime, which was considered God's punishment for sins. The book stated that repentance would bring back Catholic rule, though it did not specify whether it would be Polish or Lithuanian.

Paliulionis wrote an official letter to the Governor of Kaunas in June 1902, arguing for the lifting of the press ban; he also personally asked Tsar Nicholas II during an audience in May 1904 to lift the press ban, with the Tsar reportedly lifting the ban on the same day. According to the memoirs of Juozapas Stakauskas, Paliulionis wanted to petition only for exemption of religious texts, but Tumas-Vaižgantas convinced him to petition to lift the ban altogether.

After the ban was lifted, Paliulionis supported the Society of Saint Casimir, which was established to publish Lithuanian books and periodicals, as well as the religious weekly newspaper Nedėldienio skaitymas. He also supported the Saulė Society that organized and maintained Lithuanian-language schools in the Kaunas Governorate. Due to his efforts, the Society's program was quickly revised to emphasize it as a Catholic organization open only to Catholics.

== Death and legacy ==
Paliulionis died on 15 May [O.S. 2 May] 1908 in Kaunas and was buried in a crypt in Kaunas Cathedral. The sculptor Juozas Zikaras created bas-relief portraits of Paliulionis and his successor Gasparas Cirtautas, which were installed at Kaunas Cathedral in 1927.

== Bibliography ==
- Antanaitis, Bronius (27 November 2009). "Iškilų ganytoją prisimenant: Žemaičių vyskupo Mečislovo Paliulionio 175-osioms gimimo metinėms". XXI amžius (in Lithuanian). 84 (1776). ISSN 2029-1299.
- Baliūnas, Vytautas (2002). "Mečislovas Paliulionis" (PDF). Panevėžio Juozo Balčikonio gimnazija 1727– 2002 (in Lithuanian). Panevėžys: Nevėžio spaustuvė. pp. 269–272. ISBN 9955-450-30-4.
- Bielskis, Petras (1999). "Didieji Žemaičių vyskupai" (PDF). Tiltai (in Lithuanian). 2 (7): 29–40. ISSN 1392-3137. Archived from the original (PDF) on 5 August 2024.
- Dambrauskas-Jakštas, Aleksandras (1975) [1930]. "Vyskupas Mečislovas-Leonardas Paliulionis". Užgesę žiburiai: biografijų ir nekrologų rinkinys (PDF) (in Lithuanian). Rome: Lietuvių katalikų mokslo akademija. pp. 213–224. OCLC 2280519.
- Jankevičienė, Algė (2002). "Kauno gotikinės bažnyčios" (PDF). Acta Academiae Artium Vilnensis (in Lithuanian). 26: Lietuvos Didžiosios Kunigaikštystės gotika: sakralinė architektūra ir dailė: 98–149. ISSN 1392-0316.
- Junkevičius, Petras (2011). "Vyskupas Mečislovas Pauiulionis" (PDF). Jie išgarsino Panevėžio kraštą: konferencijų pranešimai (in Lithuanian). Panevėžys: Reklamos forma. pp. 73–80. ISBN 978-609-95240-2-3.
- Kumor, Bolesław (1980). "Mieczysław Leonard Pallulon". Polski Słownik Biograficzny (in Polish). Vol. XXV. pp. 94–95. ISBN 8304004550.
- Merkys, Vytautas (1994). Knygnešių laikai 1864–1904 (in Lithuanian). Vilnius: Valstybinis leidybos centras. ISBN 9986-09-018-0.
- Petraitienė, Irena (2 May 2012). "Žemaičių vyskupas M. L. Paliulionis: už spaudos laisvę M. Valančiaus praskintu keliu". Bernardinai.lt (in Lithuanian).
- Prokop, Krzysztof (2012). "Wypisy z XVIII- i XIX-wiecznej prasy periodycznej na temat sakr biskupów kośioła katolickiego z historycznysh ziem polskich". Biuletyn Biblioteki Jagiellońskiej (in Polish). LXII. ISBN 978-83-934926-3-3.
- Pukienė, Vida (2013). Prelatas Konstantinas Olšauskas: visuomenės veikėjo tragedija (PDF) (in Lithuanian). Edukologija. ISBN 978-9955-20-884-6. Archived from the original (PDF) on 2018-08-11.
- Stakauskas, Juozapas (August–September 1939). "Vyskupas M. L. Paliulionis ir lietuviškasis klausimas". Židinys (in Lithuanian). 8–9 (30): 230–262.
- Šenavičienė, Ieva (2005). Dvasininkija ir lietuvybė: Katalikų bažnyčios atsinaujinimas Žemaičių vyskupijoje XIX a. 5-7-ajame dešimtmetyje (PDF) (in Lithuanian). Vilnius: Lietuvos istorijos instituto leidykla. ISBN 9986780748.
- Vyšniauskas, Marius (18 November 2014). "Vardai, įamžinti akmenyje". kamane.lt (in Lithuanian).
- Žaltauskaitė, Vilma (2001). "Dvasininkijos kartų konfliktas: retorika ir turinys". Darbai ir dienos (in Lithuanian). 28: 243–253. ISSN 2335-8769.
