= Stanisław Łoza =

Roman Catholic prelate (1573–1639)

Most Reverend Stanisław Łoza Bishop
- Auxiliary Bishop of Lutsk [sufragan łucki] Titular Bishop of Argos
- Church: Catholic Church
- Diocese: Diocese of Lutsk
- In office: 1632–1639

Personal details
- Born: 1573 Łozy
- Died: 1639 (aged 65–66) Lutsk, Ukraine

Stanisław Łoza (1573–1639) was a Roman Catholic prelate who served as Auxiliary Bishop of Lutsk (1632–1639) and Titular Bishop of Argos (1632–1639).

== Biography ==
Stanisław Łoza was born in Łozy in 1573. On 26 March 1632, he was selected by the King of Poland and confirmed by Pope Urban VIII on 12 June 1634 as Auxiliary Bishop of Lutsk and Titular Bishop of Argos. On 4 March 1635, he was consecrated bishop by Maciej Łubieński, Bishop of Włocławek, with Jerzy Tyszkiewicz, Bishop of Žemaičiai, and Andrzej Gembicki, Titular Bishop of Teodosia, serving as co-consecrators. He served as Auxiliary Bishop of Lutsk until his death in 1639.

== External links and additional sources ==
- Cheney, David M. "Diocese of Lutsk". Catholic-Hierarchy.org. (for Chronology of Bishops) ^{[self-published]}
- Chow, Gabriel. "Diocese of Lutsk (Ukraine)". GCatholic.org. (for Chronology of Bishops) ^{[self-published]}
- Cheney, David M. "Argos (Titular See)". Catholic-Hierarchy.org. (for Chronology of Bishops) ^{[self-published]}
- Chow, Gabriel. "Titular Episcopal See of Argos (Greece)". GCatholic.org. (for Chronology of Bishops) ^{[self-published]}

Catholic Church titles
Preceded by Franciszek Zajerski	Titular Bishop of Argos; 1632–1639	Succeeded by Mikołaj Krasicki
Preceded by	Auxiliary Bishop of Lutsk; 1632–1639	Succeeded by
