= Cyryl Lubowidzki =

Catholic prelate (1824–1898)

The Most Reverend Cyryl Lubowidzki
- Bishop of Lutsk-Zhytomyr-Kamyanets
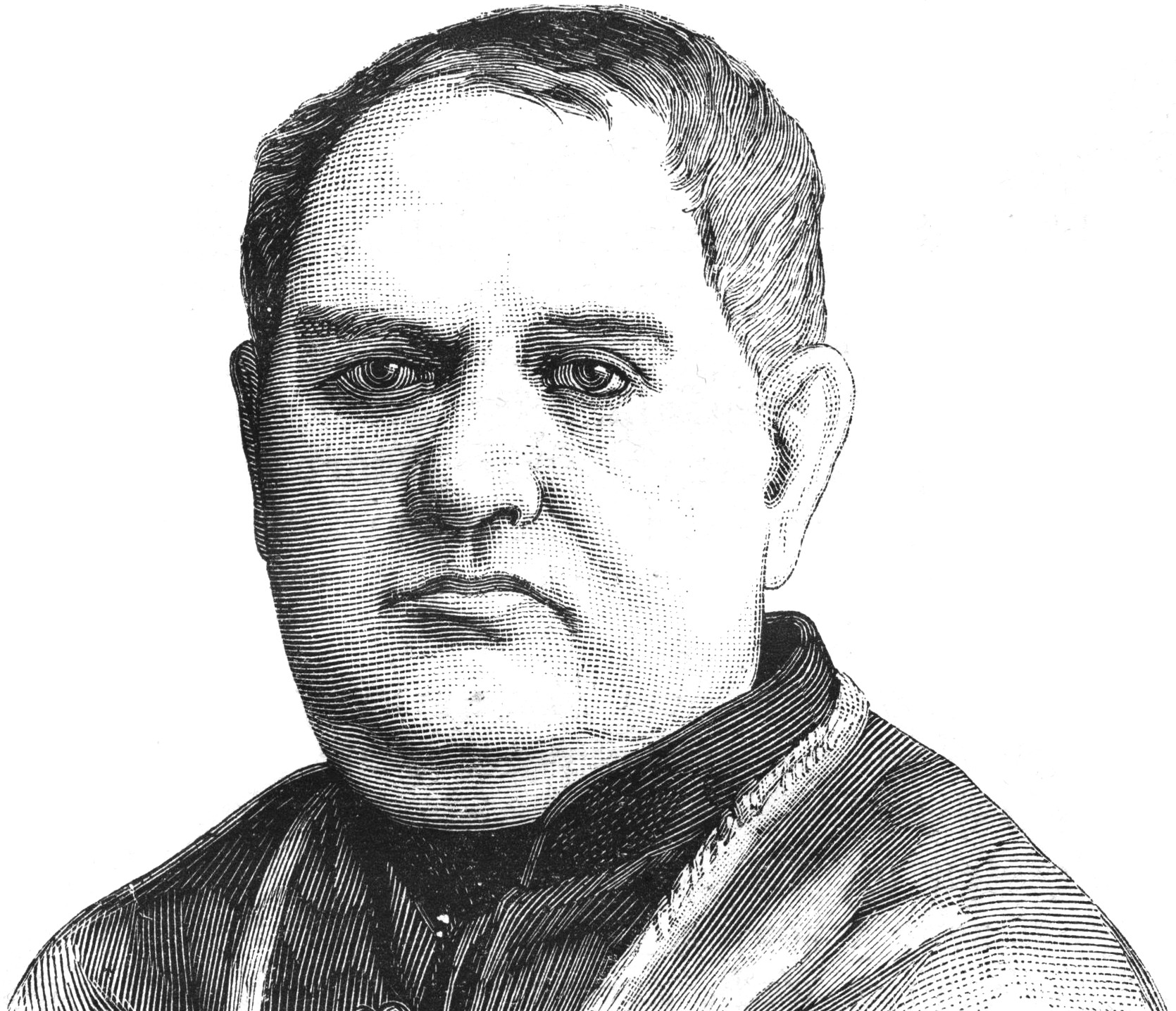
- Church: Catholic Church
- Diocese: Lutsk-Zhytomyr-Kamyanets
- Appointed: 2 August 1897
- Predecessor: Szymon Marcin Kozłowski
- Successor: Bolesław Hieronim Kłopotowski
- Other post: Apostolic Administrator of Lutsk-Zhytomyr-Kamyanets Auxiliary Bishop of Lutsk-Zhytomyr-Kamyanets Bishop of Duvno

Personal details
- Born: 15 July 1824 Durkhiv, Rivne, Russian Empire
- Died: 9 June 1898 (aged 73) Zhytomyr, Russian Empire
- Buried: Zhytomyr, Ukraine
- Denomination: Catholic

Ordination history of Cyryl
History
Diaconal ordination
- Ordained by: Kazimierz Dmochowski
- Date: 3 April 1847
- Place: Zhytomyr, Russian Empire
Priestly ordination
- Ordained by: Kazimierz Dmochowski
- Date: 12 September 1847
- Place: Zhytomyr, Russian Empire
Episcopal consecration
- Principal consecrator: Aleksander Kazimierz Gintowt-Dziewałtowski
- Co-consecrators: Szymon Marcin Kozłowski Antoni Jan Zerr
- Date: 29 June 1884
- Place: Sankt Peterburg, Russian Empire

Cyryl Lubowidzki (15 July 1824 – 9 June 1898) was a Catholic prelate who served as bishop of Lutsk-Zhytomyr-Kamyanets from 1897 until 1898, and as Apostolic Administrator of Lutsk-Zhytomyr-Kamyanets on two occasions, from 1878 until 1883 and from 1891 until 1897. In 1884, he was appointed Auxiliary Bishop of Lutsk-Zhytomyr-Kamyanets and consecrated as a titular bishop of Duvno, and succeeded Szymon Marcin Kozłowski as Bishop of Lutsk-Zhytomyr-Kamyanets.

== Early life ==
Cyryl Lubowidzki was born in Durkhiv near Rivne in the Berezne parish (Diocese of Lutsk-Zhytomyr-Kamyanets) as a son of Ignacy and Tekla née Podhorecka (Pohorecki). He came from the Lubowiecki (Lubowidzki) family, originating from Lubowiec in Lipno County. After the initial home studies, he studied at a gymnasium in Zhytimyr. Then, at the age of fourteen, he entered the seminary in Lutsk in 1837 (a year later, he received the sacrament of confirmation). His then rector, Fr. Wiktor Ożarowski (grandson of the infamous Hetman Piotr Ożarowski), saw in the young alumni a talent for learning and obtained permission from Bishop Piwnicki to send him to Vilnius to study theology there. Lubowidzki started the studies in 1841, but a year later he moved with the Vilnius Clerical Academy to Saint Petersburg. There, on 22 June 1845, he obtained a master's degree in theology (on the same day as Szymon Marcin Kozłowski, who is almost four years older).

Recommended by the rector of the St.Petersburg Academy, Fr. Ignacy Hołowiński (later Metropolitan of Mohliev), after his return to his mother diocese, on 11 October 1845, he was appointed professor of dogmatic theology at the theological seminary in Zhytomyr. However, he was only a seminarian of minor orders. He was ordained a priest only after the age of 24 on 12 September 1847 in the post-Augustinian church in Vilnius, by the local suffragan Kazimierz Dmochowski, who was elevated to the metropolitan capital in Mogilev the following year, and who had also previously ordained him to subdiaconate (20 March 1847) and the diaconate (3 April 1847).

In the Zhytomyr seminary, Fr. Lubowidzki taught continuously for 31 years, until its forced closure on 15 November 1876. During this period, he also experienced constant kindness from Bishop Kasper Borowski, who held the episcopal office from 1848 in the Diocese of Lutsk-Zhytomyr-Kamyanets, his former professor of Church history and canon law at the Spiritual Academy. The same shepherd appointed him an honorary canon on 5 October 1850 and 8 December 1855, a general canon (and deputy custodian) of the cathedral chapter of Zhytomyr. He also appointed Lubowidzki in 1856 the visitor of the diocesan seminary, a duty he held for 16 years, until 1874 when he became a member of the bishop's consistory and the inspector of monasteries in the diocese. In addition to didactic work (apart from dogmatic theology, he also taught catechism, ritual and church singing, and took care of the seminary library) and curial work, the future shepherd was active in pastoral ministry, first as a parish priest in Kotelnia (1857–59), and after a fifteen-year break, in a similar function in Vinnitsa in Podolia, which he retained until his episcopal nomination (1874–84). In turn, in the structure of the cathedral chapter, he was promoted to scholastic (1861), cantor (1864) and archdeacon (1866), and finally in 1876 to become the dean prelature. As such, he was elected on 9 July 1878 the capitular deputy to the Catholic Theological College in Saint Petersburg, but before the necessary approval by the secular authority took place, he was elected on 5 September of the same year by the chapter the administrator of the diocese in place of the deceased Fr. Prelate Maksymilian Roszkowski. After prior approval of this election by the government authorities, on 13 November 1878, a canonical mission from the Holy See entrusted him with the administration of the Diocese of Lutsk-Zhytomyr-Kamyanets simultaneously.

== Apostolic administrator and bishop ==
As an administrator, he managed to obtain from Emperor Alexander II a decision to re-establish the diocesan seminary (5 January 1881), closed in 1876, which resumed its activity on 29 November 1881. At that time, the seminary building in Zhytomyr was renovated. In matters entrusted to his care, Fr. Cyril Lubowidzki had to go directly to the government bodies in Saint Petersburg to seek the implementation of the postulates put forward directly at the highest authorities of the Russian Empire. After less than five years of administration, on 1 July 1885, he had to greet the new shepherd of Lutsk-Zhytomyr-Kamyanets, Bishop Szymon Marcin Kozłowski (his friend from the time of his studies at the St. Petersburg Theological Academy), to whom he handed over the office.

Thanks to the efforts of the same ordinary, Fr. Cyril Lubowidzki was appointed in 1884 to the post of suffragan of Lutsk-Zhytomyr-Kamyanets, which had been vacant for ten years (his predecessor, bishop Ludwik Bartłomiej Brynk, died on 19 September 1874). At the consistory on 24 March 1884, Pope Leo XIII preconised him as titular bishop of Duvno and auxiliary for Lutsk-Zhytomyr-Kamyanets (at the same consistory also four other suffragans for Catholic dioceses in the Russian Empire were nominated). The consecration of the nominee took place on 29 June 1884 in the church of St. Katarzyna Aleksandryjska in Sankt Petersburg, and was led by the Metropolitan of Mogilev, Aleksander Kazimierz Gintowt-Dziewałtowski, together with the Lutsk-Zhytomyr-Kamyanets ordinary, Szymon Marcin Kozłowski and the Tyrespole suffragan, Antoni Jan Zerr.

Less than a year and a half after his elevation to the dignity of the Ordinary, on 9 June 1898, during which the Solemnity of Corpus Christi fell, Bishop Cyril Lubowidzki died after long-suffering in his bishop's residence in Zhytomyr. Funeral ceremonies were held in the local church of St. Zofia on 14 June 1898, on which day the cathedral canons also elected the capitular vicar for the duration of the vacancy in the person of the local suffragan, preconized less than a year ago by Bolesław Hieronim Kłopotowski.
