= Stanisław Bedliński =

Roman Catholic bishop

Most Reverend Stanisław Bedliński
- Auxiliary Bishop of Lutsk; Titular Bishop of Caesaropolis
- Church: Catholic Church
- Diocese: Diocese of Lutsk
- In office: 1683–1689

Orders
- Consecration: 6 Feb 1684 by Mikołaj Oborski

Personal details
- Died: 1689 Lutsk, Ukraine

Stanisław Bedliński (died 1689) was a Roman Catholic prelate who served as Auxiliary Bishop of Lutsk (1683–1689).

== Biography ==
Stanisław Bedliński was born in 1633. On 27 Sep 1683, he was appointed during the papacy of Pope Innocent XI as Auxiliary Bishop of Lutsk and Titular Bishop of Caesaropolis. On 6 Feb 1684, he was consecrated bishop by Mikołaj Oborski, Titular Bishop of Laodicea in Syria. He served as Auxiliary Bishop of Lutsk until his death in 1689.

== See also ==
- Catholic Church in Ukraine

== External links and additional sources ==
- Cheney, David M. "Diocese of Lutsk". Catholic-Hierarchy.org. (for Chronology of Bishops) ^{[self-published]}
- Chow, Gabriel. "Diocese of Lutsk (Ukraine)". GCatholic.org. (for Chronology of Bishops) ^{[self-published]}
