= Jan Leszczyński =

Jan Leszczyński may refer to:

- Jan Leszczyński (footballer, born 1946), Polish football right-back
- Jan Leszczyński (footballer, born 2007), Polish football centre-back for Borussia Mönchengladbach
