= Bogusław Radoszewski =

Polish noble and Roman Catholic priest

- Bishop of Lutsk
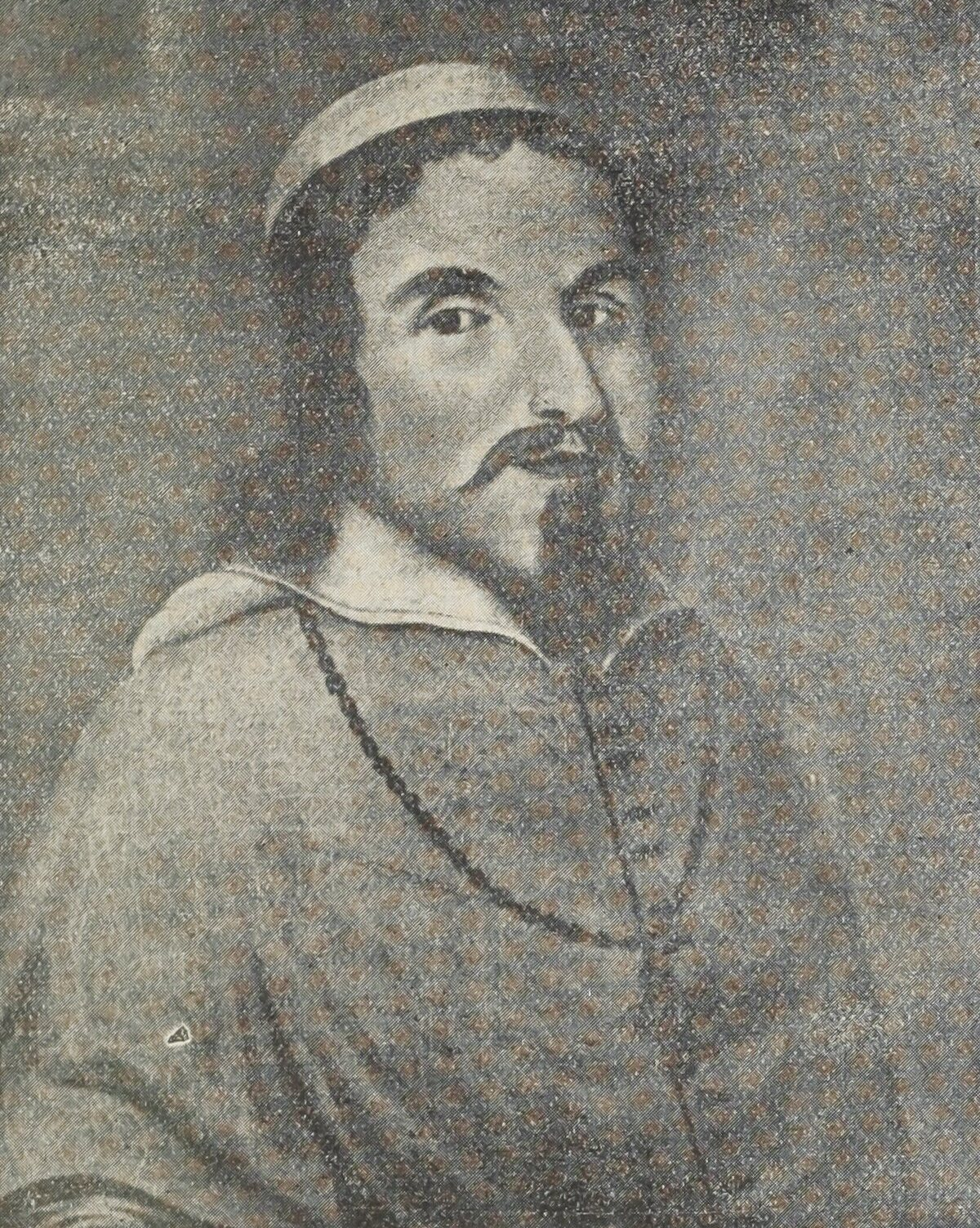
- Church: Catholic Church
- Diocese: Diocese of Lutsk
- In office: 6 June 1633 – 1638
- Predecessor: Achacy Grochowski
- Successor: Andrzej Gembicki
- Previous post: Bishop of Kyiv (1619-1633)

Orders
- Ordination: 1607
- Consecration: by Marcin Szyszkowski

Personal details
- Born: 1577 Siemkowice, Sieradz Voivodeship, Kingdom of Poland, Polish–Lithuanian Commonwealth
- Died: 1638 (aged 60–61)

Bogusław Radoszewski (c. 1577–1638) of Oksza coat of arms was a Polish noble and Roman Catholic priest. Born around 1577 at Siemkowice, he became the abbot of Order of Saint Benedict monastery Święty Krzyż on Łysa Góra, he was the Bishop of Kijów (Kyiv) from 1619 to February 1633, and afterwards Bishop of Łuck (Lutsk). He died in 1638.

In Modliborzyce, he sponsored the construction of hospital. Radoszewski obtained royal permission to colonize the area along the Kamienna River.
