= Roman Catholic Diocese of Kyiv and Chernihiv =

Diocese in Ukraine

The Diocese of Kyiv and Chernihiv or Diocese of Kyiv–Černihiv (Latin: Dioecesis Kioviensis seu Chioviensis) was a Roman Catholic ecclesiastical territory in the city of Kyiv in the north central part of Ukraine on the Dnieper River. It was suppressed in 1798.

== History ==
- 1321: Established as Diocese of Kyiv
- 1638: Renamed as Diocese of Kyiv and Chernihiv
- 1798 Aug 8: Suppressed to establish the Diocese of Lutsk and Zytomierz

== Ordinaries ==
=== Diocese of Kyiv ===
Erected: 1321
Latin Name: Kioviensis

- Henri, O.P. (15 Dec 1320 Appointed - 1350 Died)

...

- Józef Wereszczyński (5 Jun 1592 - 1599 Died)
- Krzysztof Kazimirski (5 May 1599 - 1618 Died)
- Bogusław Radoszewski (17 Jan 1619 - 6 Jun 1633 Appointed, Bishop of Lutsk)
- Andrzej Szołdrski (9 Jan 1634 - 13 Aug 1635 Appointed, Bishop of Przemyśl)
- Alexander Sokołowski (21 Jul 1636 - 9 May 1645 Died)

=== Diocese of Kyiv and Chernihiv ===
Name Changed: 1638
Latin Name: Kioviensis seu Chioviensis

- Stanisław Zaremba, O. Cist. (23 Apr 1646 - 3 Aug 1653 Died)
- Jan Leszczyński (21 Apr 1655 - 10 Jan 1656 Appointed, Bishop of Chelmno)
- Tomasz Wieyski (Ujejski) (3 Apr 1656 - 12 Jun 1679 Resigned)
- Jan Stanisław Witwicki (12 Jun 1679 - 25 May 1682 Appointed, Bishop of Lutsk)
- Andrzej Chryzostom Załuski (15 Nov 1683 - 15 Oct 1692 Appointed, Bishop of Płock)
- Mikołaj Stanisław Święcicki (25 Feb 1697 - 18 May 1699 Appointed, Bishop of Poznań)
- Jan Gomoliński (30 Mar 1700 - Sep 1714 Died)
- Valentinus Matthias Arcemberski (29 May 1715 - 1717 Died)
- Jan Joachim Tarło (5 Dec 1718 - 15 Mar 1723 Confirmed, Bishop of Poznań)
- Samuel Ozga (27 Sep 1723 - 19 Apr 1756 Died)
- Kajetan Ignacy Sołtyk (19 Apr 1756 - 12 Feb 1759 Confirmed, Bishop of Kraków)
- Józef Andrzej Załuski (24 Sep 1759 - 7 Jan 1774 Died)
- Franciszek Kandyd Ossoliński, O.F.M. Conv. (7 Jan 1774 - 7 Aug 1784 Died)
- Kasper Kazimierz Kolumna Cieciszowski (7 Aug 1784 - 17 Nov 1798 Appointed, Bishop of Lutsk and Zhytomyr)

== See also ==
- Catholic Church in Ukraine
