= Stefan Antoni Mdzewski =

Most Reverend Stefan Antoni Mdzewski
- Auxiliary Bishop of Gniezno; Titular Bishop of Calama
- Church: Catholic Church
- Archdiocese: Archdiocese of Gniezno
- In office: 1699–1718
- Previous post: Auxiliary Bishop of Lutsk (1690–1699)

Orders
- Ordination: 2 May 1671
- Consecration: 12 March 1690 by Bogusław Leszczyński (bishop)

Personal details
- Born: 1653 Płock
- Died: 16 May 1718 (aged 64–65) Gniezno, Poland

Stefan Antoni Mdzewski, O.P. (1653 – 16 May 1718) was a Roman Catholic prelate who served as Auxiliary Bishop of Gniezno (1699–1718) and Auxiliary Bishop of Lutsk (1690-1699).

== Biography ==
Stefan Antoni Mdzewski was born in Płock in 1653 and ordained a priest in the Order of Preachers on 2 May 1671. On 11 January 1690, he was appointed during the papacy of Pope Alexander VIII as Auxiliary Bishop of Lutsk and Titular Bishop of Calama. On 12 March 1690, he was consecrated bishop by Bogusław Leszczyński (bishop), Bishop of Lutsk, with Andrzej Chryzostom Załuski, Bishop of Kyiv and Chernihiv, serving as co-consecrator. On 13 August 1699, he was appointed during the papacy of Pope Innocent XII as Auxiliary Bishop of Gniezno. He served as Auxiliary Bishop of Gniezno until his death on 16 May 1718.

== Episcopal succession ==
While bishop, he was the principal co-consecrator of:

- Kazimierz Jan Szczuka, Bishop of Chelmno (1693);
- Kazimierz Łubieński, Auxiliary Bishop of Kraków (1701);
- Aleksander Benedykt Wyhowski, Bishop of Lutsk (1703); and
- Jan Mikolaj Łubieniecki, Bishop of Bacău (1711).
