= Lithuanian book smugglers =

1864–1904 group in the Russian Empire

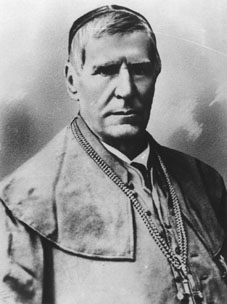
Motiejus Valančius, one of the main supporters of the Lithuanian press during the ban

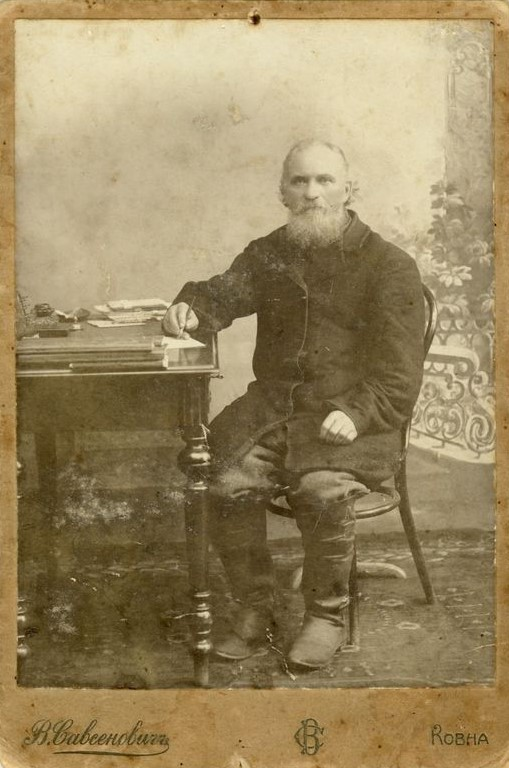
Jurgis Bielinis, one of the most famous book-smugglers

Lithuanian book smugglers or Lithuanian book carriers (Lithuanian: knygnešiaĩ, singular: knygnešys) smuggled Lithuanian language books printed in the Latin alphabet into Lithuanian-speaking areas of the Russian Empire, defying a ban on such materials in force from 1864 to 1904. In Lithuanian, knygnešys literally means "the one who carries books". Opposing imperial Russian authorities' efforts to replace the traditional Latin orthography with Cyrillic, and transporting printed matter from as far away as the United States to do so, the book smugglers became a symbol of Lithuanians' resistance to Russification.

== History ==
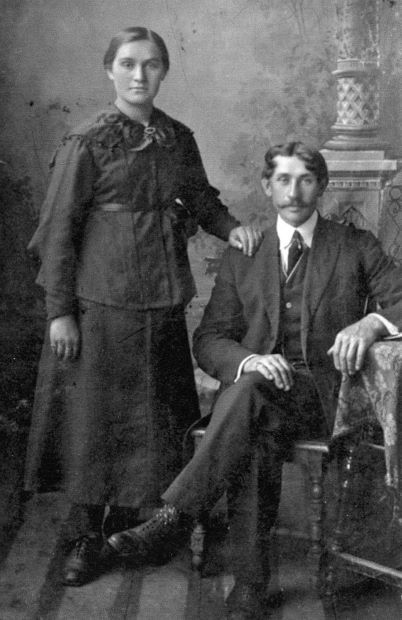
Lithuanian book carrier Martynas Survila with his wife Ona, circa 1899

After the Polish-Lithuanian insurrection of 1863, the Russian Imperial government intensified its efforts to Russify the Lithuanian population and alienate it from its historic roots, including the Roman Catholic faith, which had become widespread during the years of the Polish–Lithuanian Commonwealth.

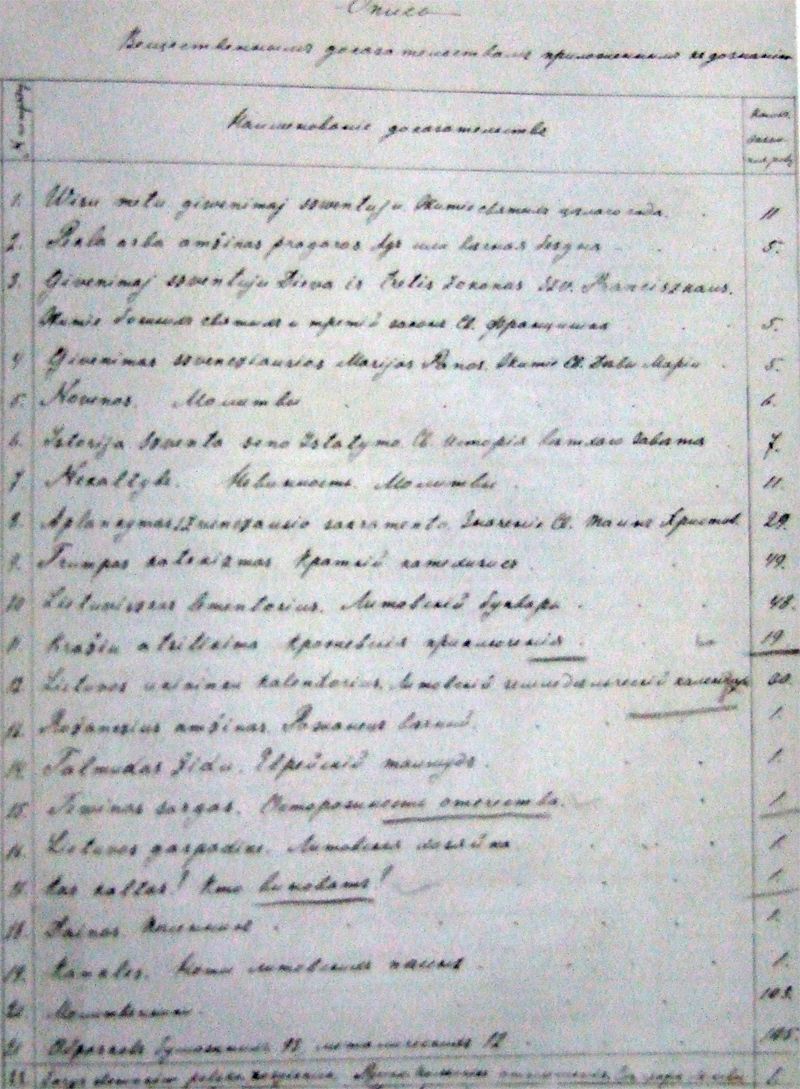
List of confiscated Lithuanian books in 1896

During the summer of 1863, Tsar Alexander II issued Temporary Rules for State Junior Schools of the Northwestern Krai, ruling that only Russian-language education would be allowed there. In 1864, the Governor General of the Vilnius Governorate, Mikhail Muravyov, ordered that Lithuanian language primers were to be printed only in the Cyrillic alphabet. Muravyov's successor, Konstantin Kaufman, banned all Lithuanian-language use of the Latin alphabet in 1865. In 1866, the Tsar issued an oral ban on the printing or importing of printed matter in Lithuanian. Although formally, the order had no legal force, it was executed de facto until 1904. During this time, there were approximately fifty-five printings of Lithuanian books in Cyrillic.

Most of the Latin-alphabet Lithuanian-language books and periodicals published at the time were printed in Lithuania Minor and then smuggled into Lithuania. When caught, the book smugglers were punished by fines, banishment, and exile, including deportation to Siberia. Some were shot after crossing the border.

In 1867, Motiejus Valančius, the Bishop of Samogitia, began to covertly organize and finance this printing abroad and sponsored the distribution of Lithuanian-language books within Lithuania. In 1870, his organization was uncovered with the help of Prussian authorities, and five priests and two book smugglers were exiled to remote areas of Russia. Other book smugglers carried on his work.

During the final years of the ban, an estimated 30,000 to 40,000 books were smuggled in annually. About one-third of them were seized by authorities. Lithuanian books reached every settlement in Lithuania, and many legal institutions served as undercover transfer points for the books. A number of secret organizations distributed the books throughout Lithuania, including Sietynas, Atgaja, Teisybė, Prievarta, Aušrinė, Atžala, Lizdas, Akstinas, Spindulys, Svirplys, Žiburėlis, Žvaigždė, and Kūdikis.

In East Prussia, from 1864 up to 1896, more than 3 500 000 copies of publications in the Lithuanian language was published: about 500 000 primers, more than 300 000 scientific secular editions, 75 000 newspapers, and other types of publications.

The ban's lack of success was recognized by the end of the 19th century, and in 1904, under the official pretext that the minorities within the Russian Empire needed to be pacified after the failure in the Russo-Japanese War, the ban on Lithuanian-language publications was lifted.

In 1905, soon after the ban was lifted, one of the book smugglers, Juozas Masiulis, opened his own bookstore in Panevėžys. This bookstore is still operational, and a chain of bookstores operates in Lithuania under his name.

This historical episode was widely suppressed during the years when Lithuania was occupied by the Soviet Union.

== Book smuggler societies ==
Society	Location	Years active	Members
Of Motiejus Valančius	Kovno Governorate	1867–70	?
Of Martynas Sederevičius	Sudargas; active in Samogitia and Suvalkija	Early 1870s – beg. of the 20th century	?
Of Garšviai	Garšviai; active in Panevėžys and Ukmergė regions	1883–95	5–7
Atgaja (Refresh)	Šiauliai region	1889–95	3–11
Šviesa Bookstore (Light )	Jurgežeris, Kalvarija District	1880	?
Rural Society of Plowmen	Šiauliai region	1891	?
(no name)	Panevėžys region	1892	9
(no name youth)	Panemunė volost, Marijampolė	1892	?
Nemunėlis and Apasčia	Biržai region	1893–?	7–?
Teisybė (Truth)		1893 – after 1896	5–15
Aušrinė	Kovno Governorate	1893–94	7
Prievarta (Coercion)		1894	?
Darželis (Little Garden)	Krikliniai	1894–95	16
Atžala (Offshoot)	Grinkiškis	1894	6–10
Sietynas (Pleiades)	Marijampolė district	1894–97	70
Žiburėlis (Little Beacon)	Panevėžys region?	1897	5–15
(no name)	Marijampolė district	1898	15
(no name)	Kovno Governorate	1899	27
Žvaigždė (Star)	Panemunėlis	1900–02	20
Lithuanian Youth	Raseiniai region	1900–01	15
Spindulys (Ray)	Marijampolė district	1900	?
Artojai (Plowmen)	Marijampolė	1901–05	13–48
Aušrelė (Little Dawn)	Panemunėlis	1900–03	5–15
Union of Lithuanian Farmers	Aukštaitija	1901	13–20
(no name)	Kovno Governorate	1902	?
Mužikėlis (Peasant)	Kairiai	1903	?
Vienybė (Unity)	Kairiai	1903–05	5–7

== Remembrance ==
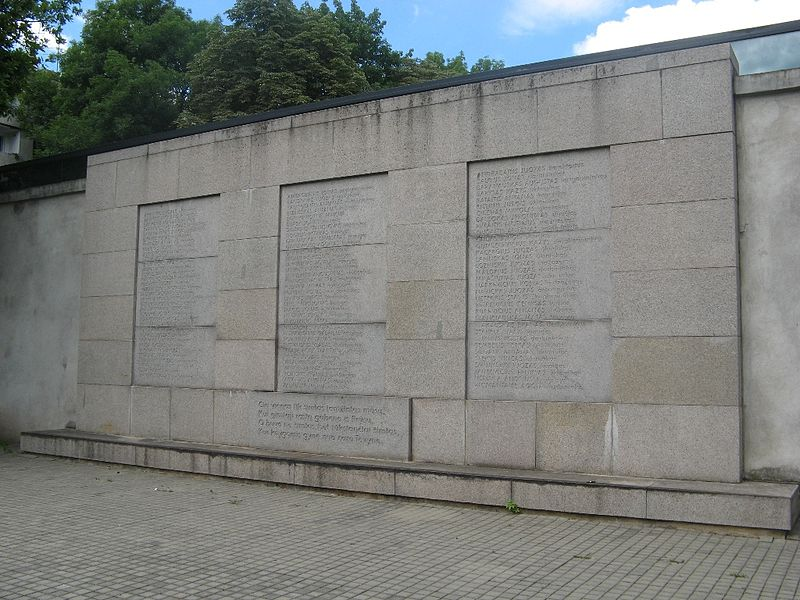
Book Smugglers' Wall

The book smugglers were an important part of the Lithuanian National Revival. After the dissolution of the Soviet Union, book smugglers were honored in Lithuania with museums, monuments, and street names. A statue dedicated to "The Unknown Book Smuggler" stands in Kaunas. The special relationship between Lithuanians and books is still seen in the highly popular Vilnius Book Fair. Lithuanian book smugglers helped shape the future. They stood tall for their country and are still honored in many places now.

Book smuggler Jurgis Bielinis, who created a secret distribution network for banned Lithuanian books, was born on 16 March 1846, and this date is commemorated in Lithuania as the Day of the Book Smugglers (Knygnešio diena).

In 1988, the Lithuanian Knygnešiai Association was established at the Lithuanian Culture Foundation. Among its goals were to collect information about all Lithuanian book smugglers and printers. As of 2017, four volumes titled Knygnešys were printed. In 1997, the "Book Smugglers' Wall" was unveiled at the Vytautas the Great War Museum. and in 1998, the book Šimtas knygnešių. Knygnešių sienelės vardai ("One Hundred Books Smugglers. Names on the Book Smugglers' Wall") was published.

During 1959–2000, there was a magazine named Knygnešys which provided information about (modern) books and book publishers.

At the 2018 London Book Fair, the tactics of Knygnešiai was used to distribute books of the Lithuanian authors and spread the information about the Lithuanian pavilion.

== See also ==
- Samizdat
- Lithuanian National Revival
- Marta Zauniūtė

== Bibliography ==
- Ruseckas, Petras (1992–1997) Knygnešys : 1864–1904 (Book-smuggler: 1864–1904) (3 vols.) Valstybinis leidybos centras, Vilnius, ISBN 9986-810-06-X (Volumes 1 & 2, reprint, originally published: Spaudos fondas, Kaunas, 1926–1928) (in Lithuanian);
- Merkys, Vytautas (1994) Knygnešių laikai: 1864–1904 (The era of the book-smugglers: 1864–1904) Valstybinis leidybos centras, Vilnius, ISBN 9986-09-018-0 (in Lithuanian);
- Merkys, Vytautas (1994) Draudžiamosios lietuviškos spaudos kelias: 1864–1904: informacinė knyga (The path of the banned Lithuanian press: 1864–1904: An information book) Vilnius: Mokslo ir enciklopedijų leidykla, Vilnius, ISBN 5-420-01181-6 (in Lithuanian);
- Kaluškevičius, Benjaminas and Žemaitytė-Narkevičienė, Ona (1998) Šimtas knygnešių: knygnešių sienelės vardai (One Hundred Book Carriers: The Names on the Book Carriers Wall) Lietuvos kultūros fondas, Lietuvos Knygnešio draugija, Vilnius, ISBN 9986-9175-0-6 (in Lithuanian);
