= Achacy Grochowski =

Polish bishop (died 1633)

- Bishop of Lutsk
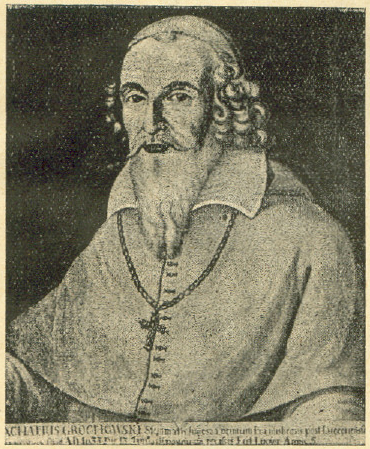
- Church: Catholic Church
- Diocese: Diocese of Lutsk
- In office: 6 October 1627 – 7 January 1633
- Predecessor: Stanisław Łubieński
- Successor: Bogusław Radoszewski
- Previous post: Bishop of Przemyśl (1624-1627)

Personal details
- Died: 7 January 1633

Achacy Grochowski (died 7 January 1633) was a Polish bishop of Przemyśl (1624–1627) and bishop of Łuck (1627–1633). He was opposed to the Reformation.
