= Stanisław Czuryło =

Polish Roman Catholic prelate

Most Reverend Stanisław Czuryło
- Auxiliary Bishop of Lutsk; Titular Bishop of Orthosias in Caria
- Church: Catholic Church
- Diocese: Diocese of Lutsk
- In office: 1659–1661

Personal details
- Died: 1661 Lutsk, Ukraine

Stanisław Czuryło (died 1661) was a Roman Catholic prelate who served as Auxiliary Bishop of Lutsk (1659–1661)

== Biography ==
On 22 Sep 1659, Stanisław Czuryło was appointed during the papacy of Pope Alexander VII as Auxiliary Bishop of Lutsk and Titular Bishop of Orthosias in Caria. He served as Auxiliary Bishop of Lutsk until his death in 1661.

== External links and additional sources ==
- Cheney, David M. "Diocese of Lutsk". Catholic-Hierarchy.org. (for Chronology of Bishops) ^{[self-published]}
- Chow, Gabriel. "Diocese of Lutsk (Ukraine)". GCatholic.org. (for Chronology of Bishops) ^{[self-published]}
