= Kazimierz Zwierz =

Roman Catholic bishop

Most Reverend Kazimierz Zwierz
- Auxiliary Bishop of Lutsk; Titular Bishop of Orthosias in Caria
- Church: Catholic Church
- Diocese: Diocese of Lutsk
- In office: 1664–1682

Orders
- Consecration: 1665

Personal details
- Died: 1682 Lutsk, Ukraine

Kazimierz Zwierz (died 1682) was a Roman Catholic prelate who served as Auxiliary Bishop of Lutsk (1664–1682)

== Biography ==
On 10 Nov 1664, Kazimierz Zwierz was appointed during the papacy of Pope Alexander VII as Auxiliary Bishop of Lutsk and Titular Bishop of Orthosias in Caria. He was consecrated bishop in 1665. He served as Auxiliary Bishop of Lutsk until his death in 1682.

== See also ==
- Catholic Church in Ukraine

== External links and additional sources ==
- Cheney, David M. "Diocese of Lutsk". Catholic-Hierarchy.org. (for Chronology of Bishops) ^{[self-published]}
- Chow, Gabriel. "Diocese of Lutsk (Ukraine)". GCatholic.org. (for Chronology of Bishops) ^{[self-published]}
