= Martynas Sederevičius =

Lithuanian priest and book smuggler

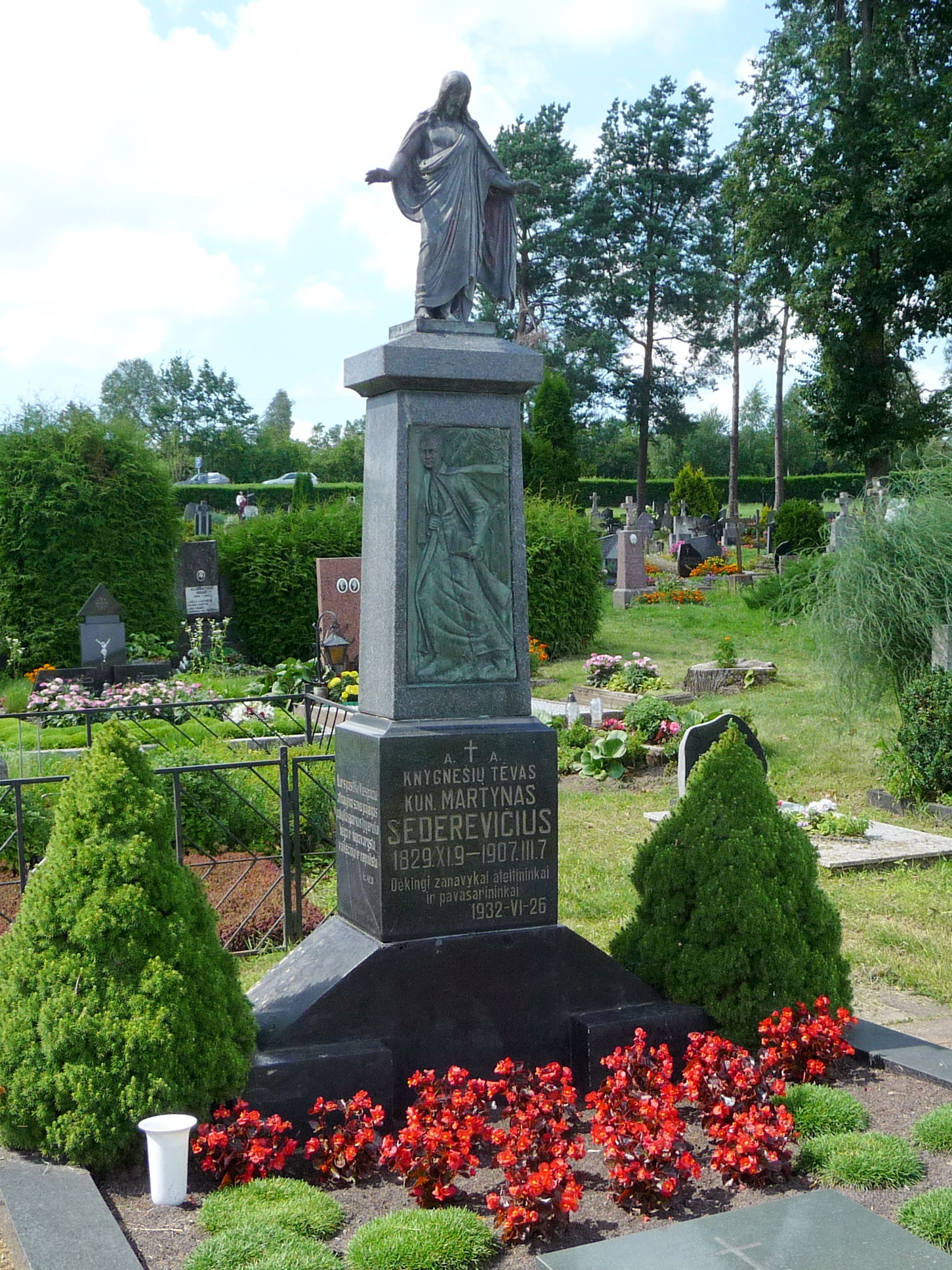
Tombstone of Sederevičius, Sudargas

Martynas Sederevičius (also Sederavičius , Sideravičius; November 9, 1829 – March 7, 1907) was a Lithuanian Roman Catholic priest, Lithuanian book smuggler, publisher and translator of religious books.

He was born in Plėgai, Lukšiai volost, then Russian Empire. In 1855 he entered the Warsaw seminary, later moved to the Sejny seminary.

In 1873 he established an underground book publishing and smuggling organization, known as the Sederevičius Organization, together with Serafinas Laurynas Kušeliauskas. It was located in Sudargas, a convenient place, only 4 km from the border with East Prussia. Its activities covered Užnemunė (Trans-Nemunas, left bank area of Nemunas) and a large part of Samogitia.
