= Mikołaj Krasicki =

17th Century Roman Catholic Prelate

Most Reverend Mikołaj Krasicki
- Auxiliary Bishop of Lutsk; Titular Bishop of Argos
- Church: Catholic Church
- Diocese: Diocese of Lutsk
- In office: 1639–1652

Personal details
- Died: 1652 Lutsk, Ukraine

Mikołaj Krasicki (died 1652) was a Roman Catholic prelate who served as Auxiliary Bishop of Lutsk (1639–1652) and Titular Bishop of Argos (1639–1652).

== Biography ==
On 3 October 1639, Mikołaj Krasicki was appointed during the papacy of Pope Innocent X as Auxiliary Bishop of Lutsk and Titular Bishop of Argos. He served as Auxiliary Bishop of Lutsk until his death in 1652.

== External links and additional sources ==
- Cheney, David M. "Diocese of Lutsk". Catholic-Hierarchy.org. (for Chronology of Bishops) ^{[self-published]}
- Chow, Gabriel. "Diocese of Lutsk (Ukraine)". GCatholic.org. (for Chronology of Bishops) ^{[self-published]}
- Cheney, David M. "Argos (Titular See)". Catholic-Hierarchy.org. (for Chronology of Bishops) ^{[self-published]}
- Chow, Gabriel. "Titular Episcopal See of Argos (Greece)". GCatholic.org. (for Chronology of Bishops) ^{[self-published]}

Catholic Church titles
Preceded by Stanisław Łoza	Titular Bishop of Argos; 1639–1652	Succeeded by Maciej Bystrom
Preceded by	Auxiliary Bishop of Lutsk; 1639–1652	Succeeded by
