= St. Francis Church, Riga =

St. Francis Church
- Rīgas Svētā Franciska baznīca
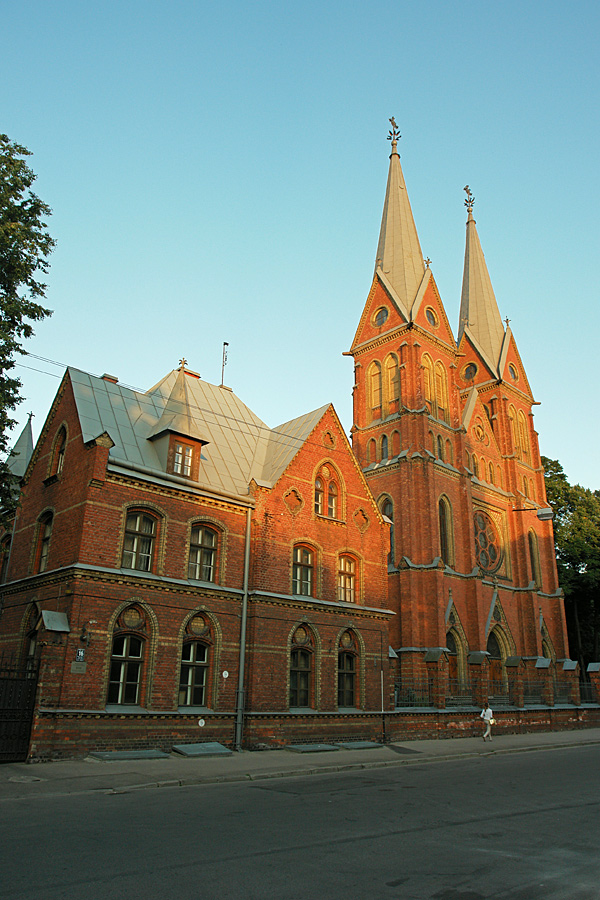

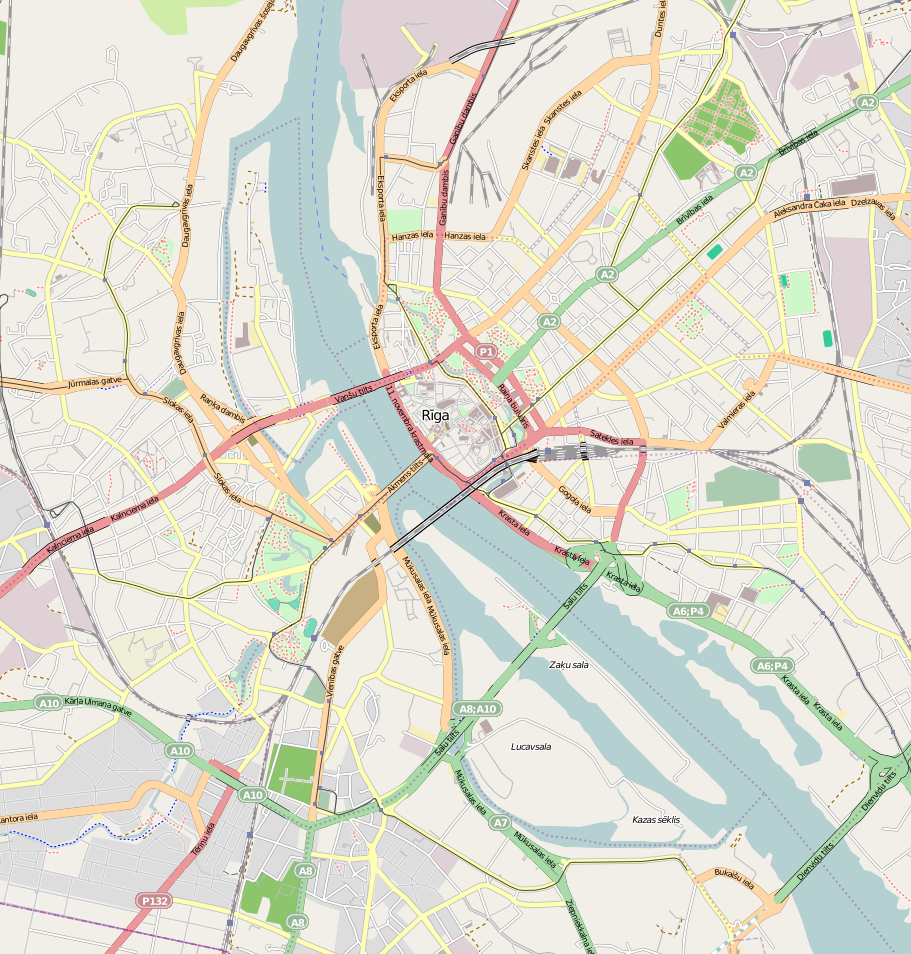
- Location within Riga
- 56°56′39.8″N 24°8′11.99″E
- Location: Riga
- Country: Latvia
- Denomination: Roman Catholic
- Website: Website

Architecture
- Architect: Florian Wyganowski
- Architectural type: Gothic Revival architecture
- Years built: 1
- Groundbreaking: 1889
- Completed: 1890

Specifications
- Height: 58 m (190 ft)

St. Francis Church (Latvian: Svētā Franciska Romas katoļu baznīca) is a Roman Catholic church in Riga, the capital of Latvia. The church is situated at the address 16 Katoļu Street in the Maskavas Forštate neighborhood. The building was consecrated in 1892 by Franciszek Albin Symon, the auxiliary bishop of Mohilev.

== Gallery ==
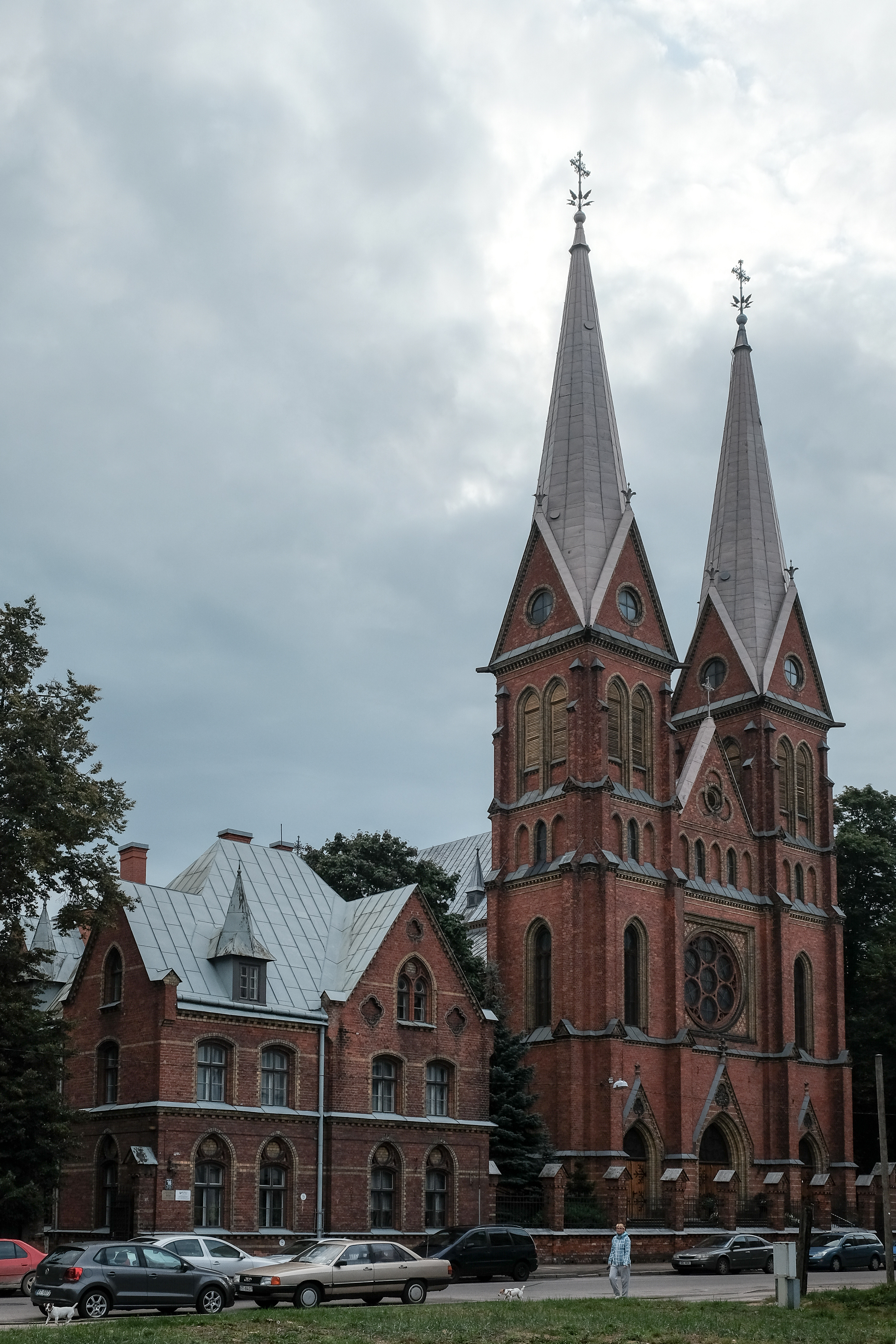
St. Francis church in 2017

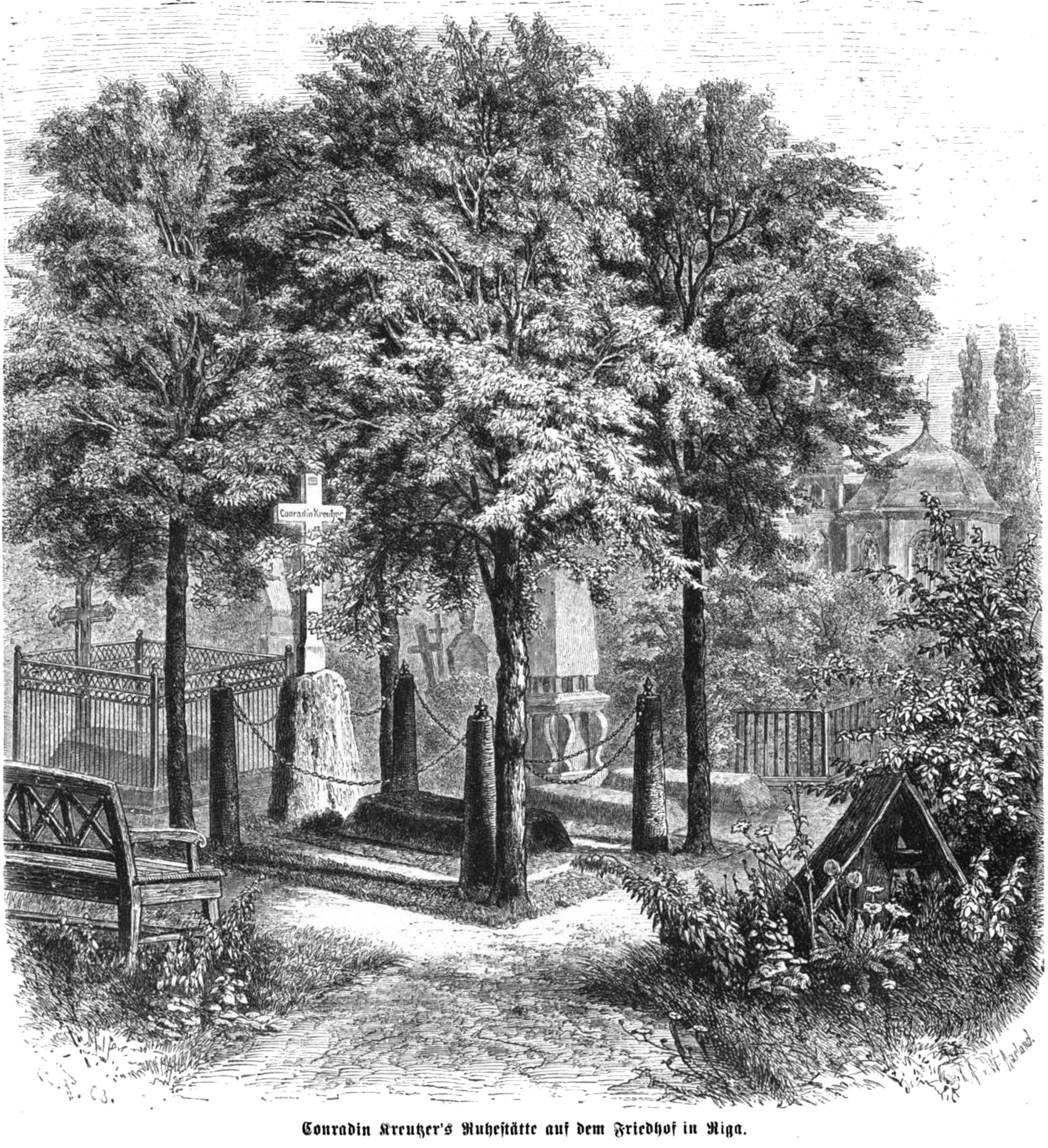
Conradin Kreutzer’s grave stone in the cemetery of St. Francis church in Riga. Die Gartenlaube (1868)

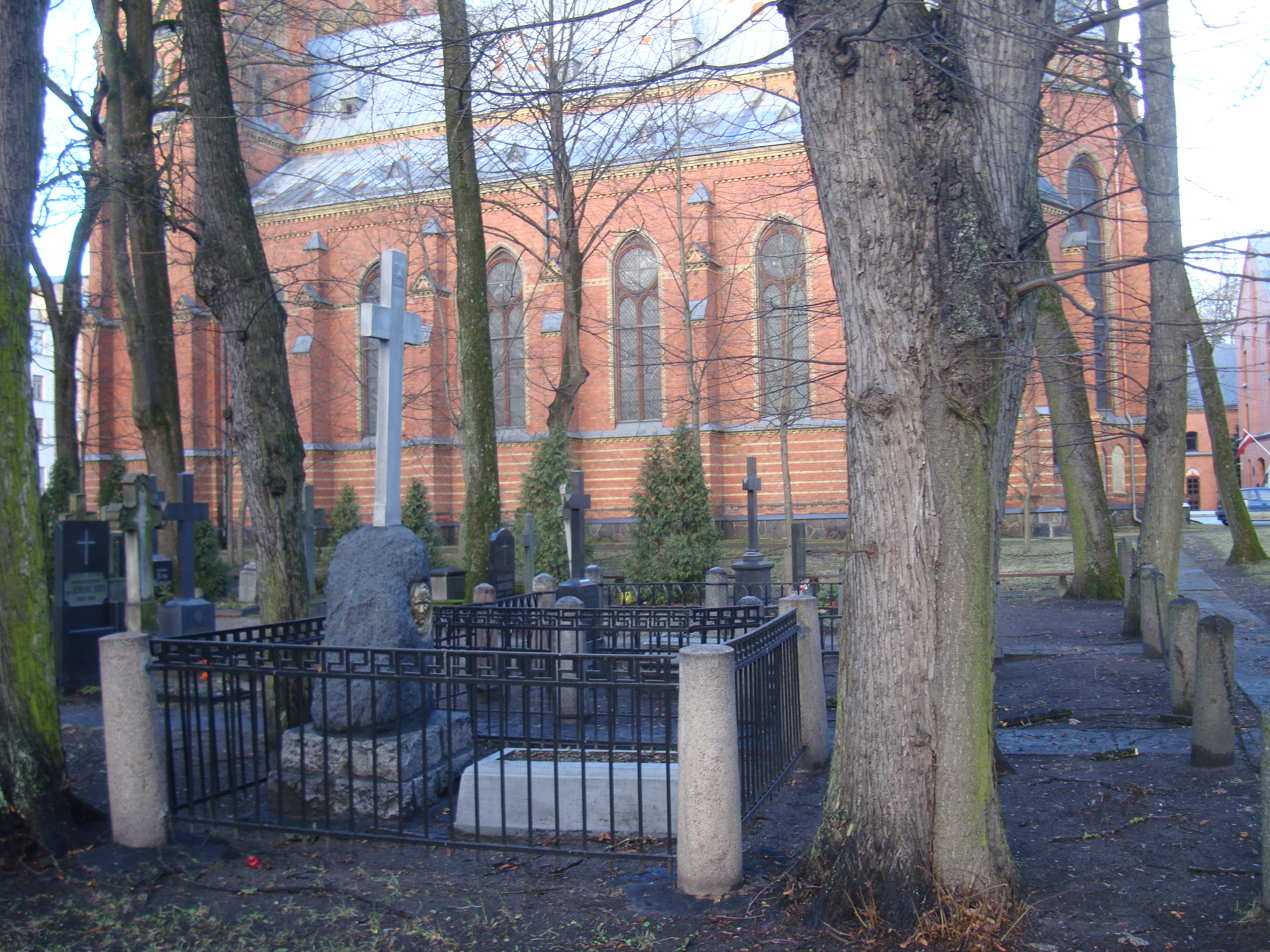
Conradin Kreutzer's grave in December 2014
