= Sacred Heart Cathedral, Rēzekne =

Coordinates: 56.4994°N 27.3392°E

Sacred Heart Cathedral
- Rēzeknes Vissvētākās Jēzus Sirds Romas katoļu katedrāle
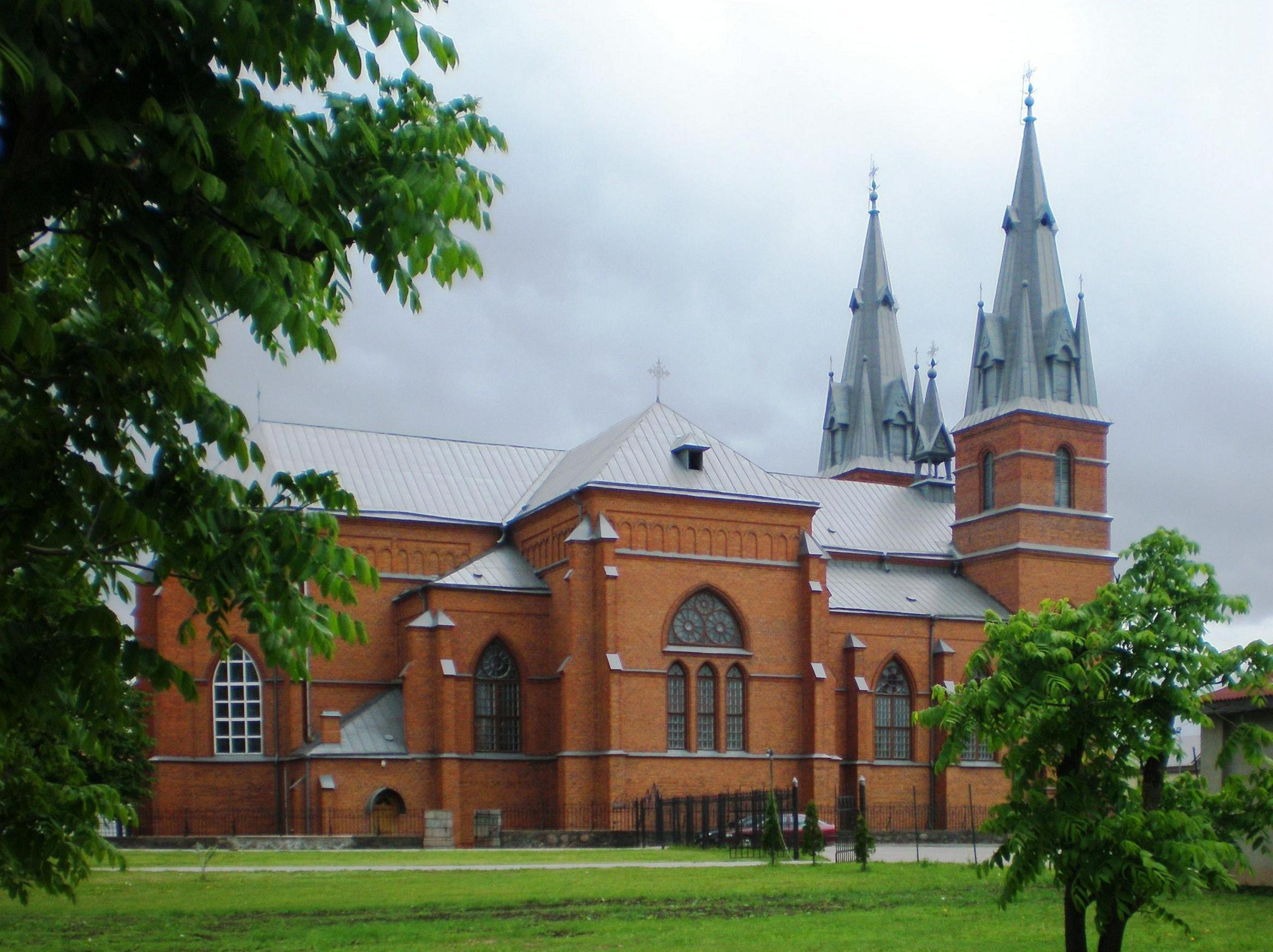
- Sacred Heart Cathedral
- Location: Rēzekne
- Country: Latvia
- Denomination: Roman Catholic Church

Architecture
- Architect: Florian Wyganowski

The Sacred Heart Cathedral (Latvian: Rēzeknes Vissvētākās Jēzus Sirds Romas katoļu katedrāle), the cathedral of the Diocese of Rezekne-Aglona, is located in Rēzekne, Latvia.

== History ==
On the site occupied by the church, there existed a wooden temple built in 1685 by Franciszek Jan Bieliński. The church burned down in 1887 during a storm and the following year the works for the new and present neo-Romanesque style church began. Construction was completed in 1902 under the guidance of Florian Wyganowski, dedicated in 1904, and consecrated in 1914.

The church was elevated to a cathedral status on December 2, 1995 with the Ad aptius consulendum bula of Pope John Paul II, when the Diocese of Rezekne-Aglona was created.

== See also ==
- Roman Catholicism in Latvia
- Sacred Heart Cathedral (disambiguation)
