= Jan Karol Czolański =

Roman Catholic prelate (died 1664)

Most Reverend Jan Karol Czolański
- Auxiliary Bishop of Lutsk; Titular Bishop of Orthosias in Caria
- Church: Catholic Church
- Diocese: Diocese of Lutsk
- In office: 1662–1664

Personal details
- Died: 10 November 1664 Lutsk, Ukraine

Jan Karol Czolański (died 10 Nov 1664) was a Roman Catholic prelate who served as Auxiliary Bishop of Lutsk (1662–1664)

== Biography ==
On 5 Jun 1662, Jan Karol Czolański was appointed during the papacy of Pope Alexander VII as Auxiliary Bishop of Lutsk and Titular Bishop of Orthosias in Caria. He served as Auxiliary Bishop of Lutsk until his death on 10 Nov 1664.

== External links and additional sources ==
- Cheney, David M. "Diocese of Lutsk". Catholic-Hierarchy.org. (for Chronology of Bishops) ^{[self-published]}
- Chow, Gabriel. "Diocese of Lutsk (Ukraine)". GCatholic.org. (for Chronology of Bishops) ^{[self-published]}
