= Sudargas =

- Village
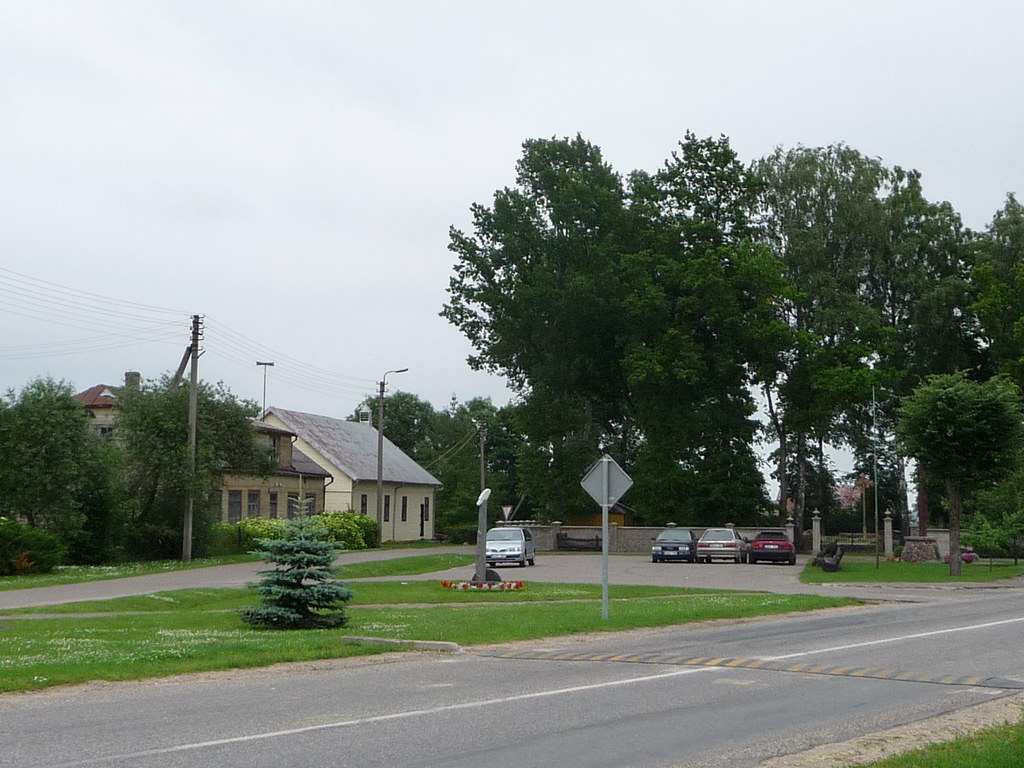
- Square by the Catholic Church

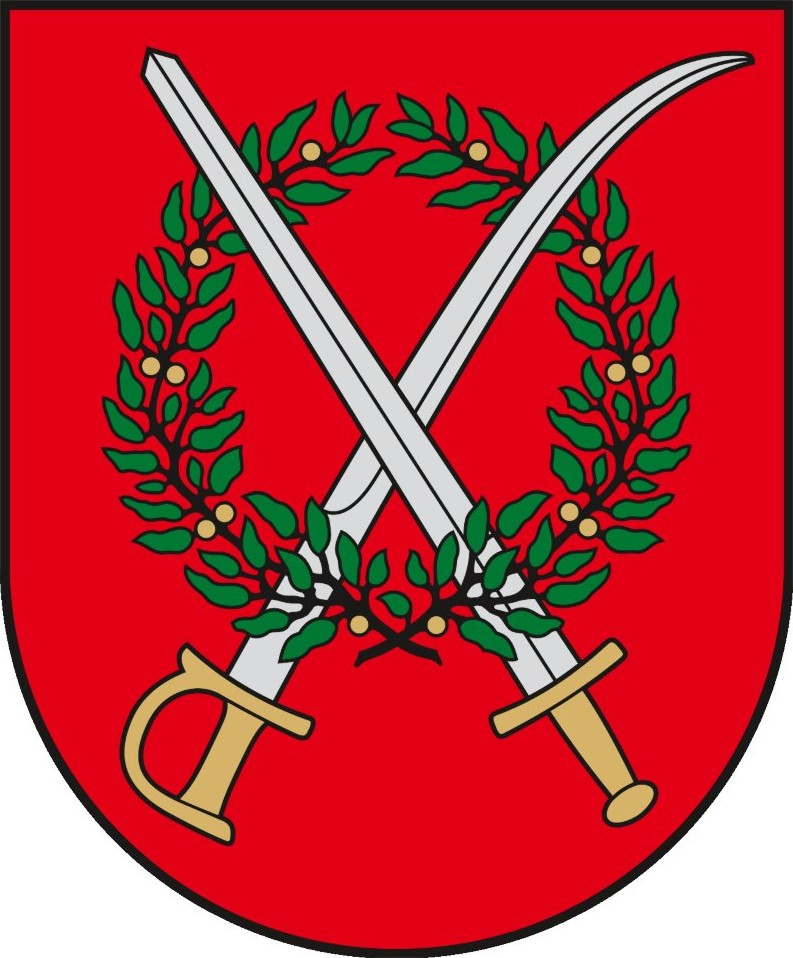
- Coat of arms

- Location within Lithuania
- Coordinates: 55°2′31.2″N 22°38′27.6″E
- Country: Lithuania
- County: Marijampolė County
- Municipality: Šakiai District Municipality
- Elderate: Sudargas elderate

Population (2021)
  - Total: 33
- Time zone: UTC+2 (EET)
  - Summer (DST): UTC+3 (EEST)
- Website: www.sudargas.lt

Sudargas is a village located in Šakiai district, west Lithuania.

== History ==
In the Middle Ages, it was one of the strongest defence centres of the region during the war with the Teutons, and it was the site of the Samogitian Sudargas Castle, which was burnt down by the Teutons on 24 June 1317. After that, the area disappeared for a long time. It was not until the beginning of the 16th century, when the Queen of Poland and Grand Duchess of Lithuania began to colonise the Panemünė region, that the settlement began to grow.

The village is mentioned in 1561.

In 1724, Jonas Mikalojus Radvila, secured the rights of the town from the Grand Duke of Lithuania, and was allowed to have a market and to organise two fairs.

In 1748, a wooden church was built in Sudargas.

On 12 May 1792, Stanisław II August granted the town rights and coat of arms.

In 1795, Sudargas was ceded to Prussia and later to Poland.

In the 19th century, Sudargas was an important centre of book smuggling, with a large flow of printed materials passing through the parish priest Martynas Sederevičius. Sudargas lost its town rights on 28 August 1870. At the end of the 19th century, it is mentioned as a settlement of Naumiestis county in the Kiduliai parish.

In 2000, coat of arms of Sudargas was adopted.

In 2003, the Sudargas Community Centre was established.

=== Archaeology ===
The Sudargas mound complex (a.k.a. the Grinaičiai mound complex) has two mounds: Grinaičiai I a.k.a. Balnakalnis and Grinaičiai II a.k.a. Žydkapiai. It adjoins the Burgaičiai mound complex, which includes 3 mounds: Burgaičiai I (a.k.a. Vorpilis), Burgaičiai II (a.k.a. Pilaitė), and Burgaičiai III.

== Demography ==
Historical population
Year	1888	1923	1959	1970	1979	1982	1987	1989	2001	2011	2021
Pop.	932	257	119	91	71	70	72	77	85	35	33
±%	—	−72.4%	−53.7%	−23.5%	−22.0%	−1.4%	+2.9%	+6.9%	+10.4%	−58.8%	−5.7%
Source: Statistics Lithuania

== Gallery ==
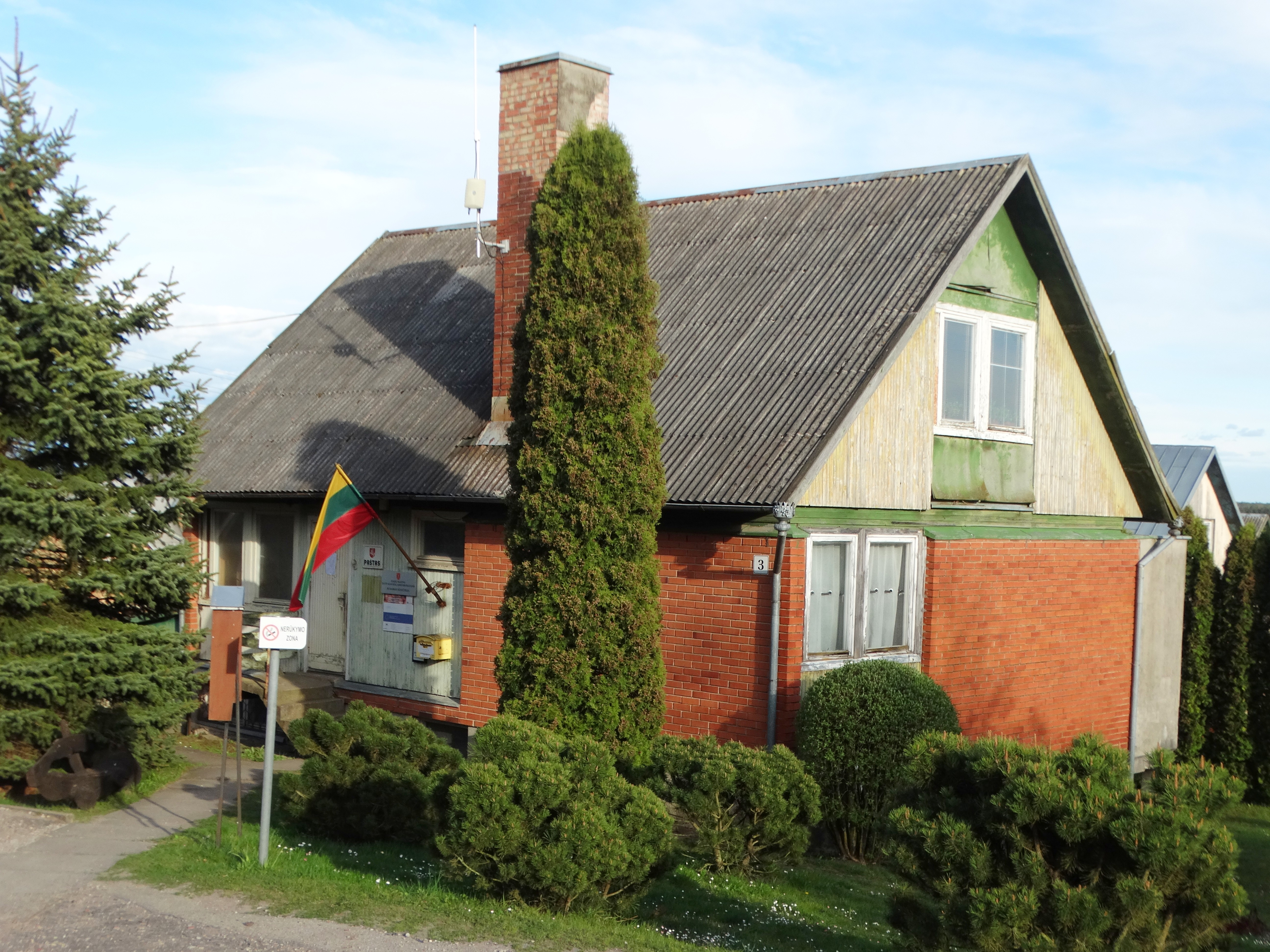
Eldership in Sudargas

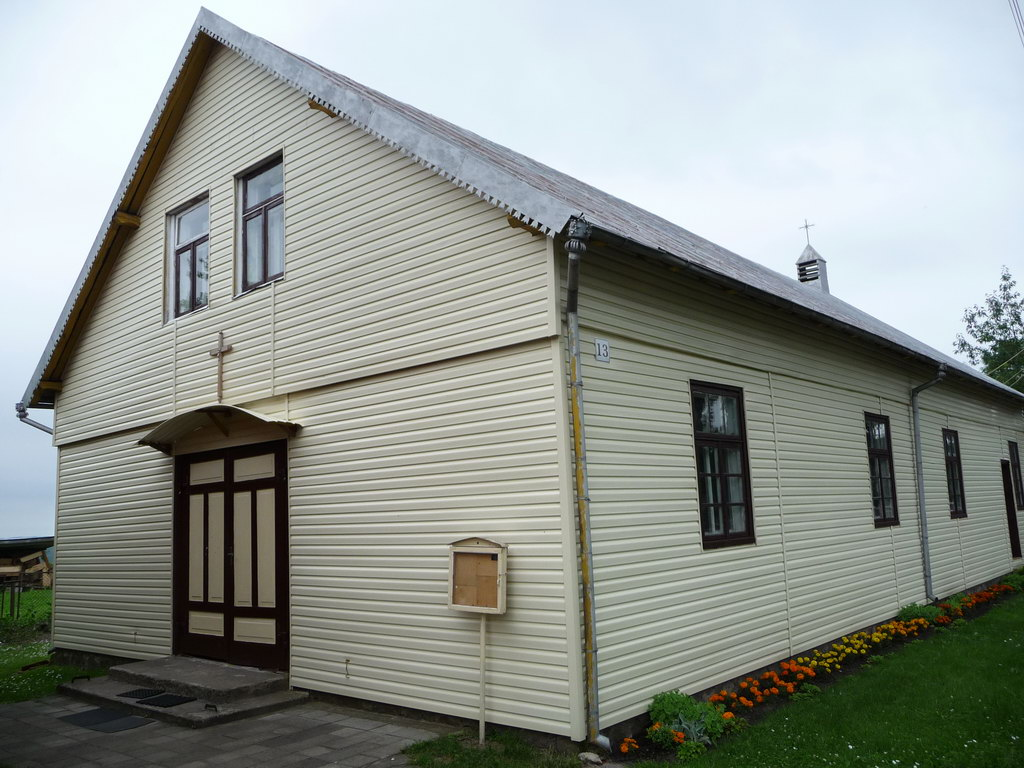
Church of St. John the Baptist

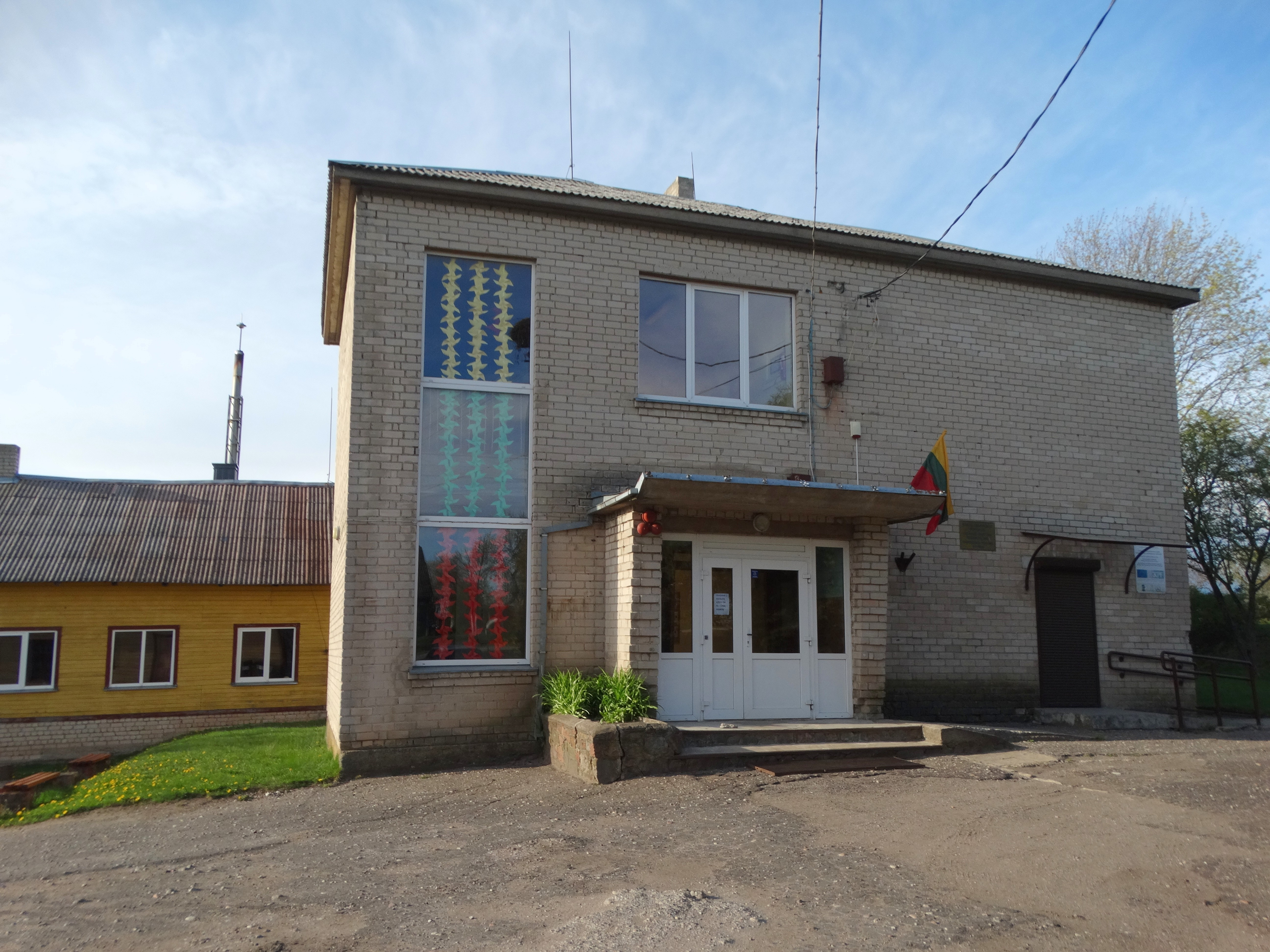
A school in Sudargas

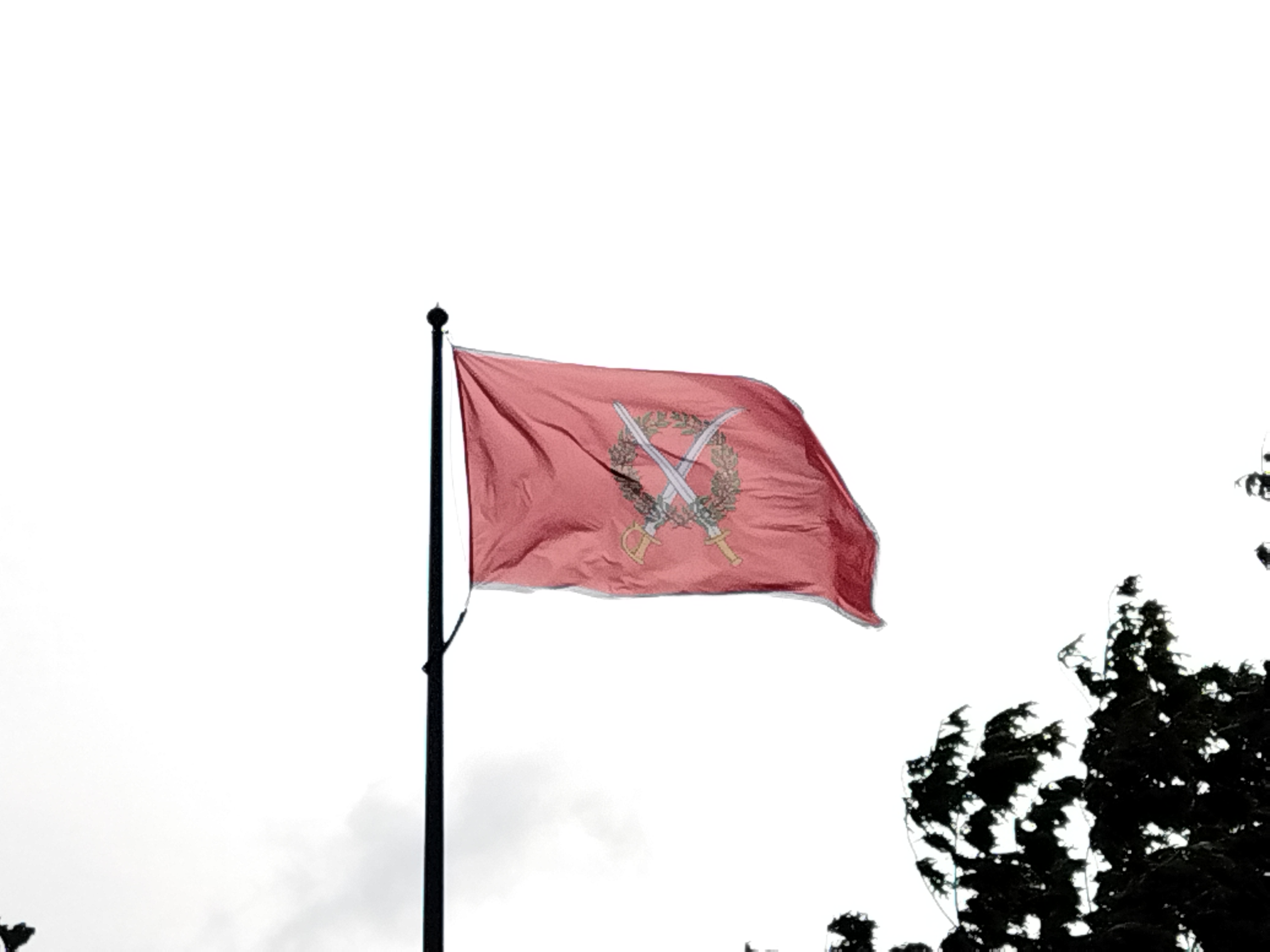
Flag of Sudargas
