= Florian Wyganowski =

Polish engineer and architect

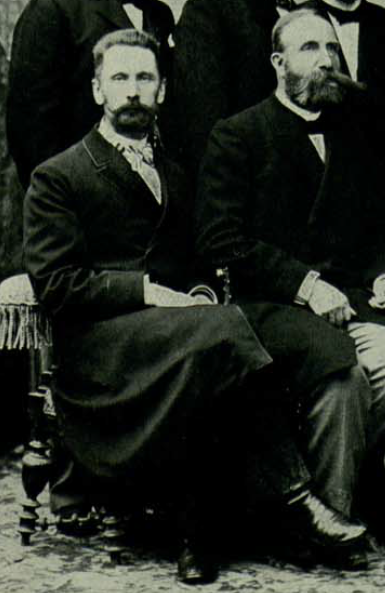
- Born: 1854; Kotra, Russian Empire
- Died: after 1914
- Education: Riga Polytechnic Institute
- Occupation: Architect

Florian Wyganowski (1854 – after 1913) was a Polish engineer, architect, and building contractor active in the late 19th and early 20th centuries in the Russian Empire. He is best known for his ecclesiastical architecture, particularly for Neo-Gothic Catholic churches in Lithuania, Latvia and Belarus.

== Biography ==
Florian Wyganowski was born in 1854 in Kotra, in the Grodno Governorate of the Russian Empire, into the family of Konstanty Wyganowski. He studied engineering at the Riga Polytechnic Institute, from which he graduated in 1877. During his studies, he co-founded the Polish student corporation Arkonia, an association bringing together students of Polish origin. After completing his studies, Wyganowski settled in Riga, where he established an architectural and engineering practice. His office was located at contemporary Pulkveža Brieža Street 2, in a building of his own design. His firm provided a wide range of services, including architectural design, construction supervision, cost estimation, and the production of decorative and concrete building elements.

Wyganowski was active in Riga’s civic and economic life. He served as a city councillor and was involved in the organization of the 1901 Riga Jubilee Exhibition. Although he designed residential and commercial buildings, Wyganowski specialized primarily in sacral architecture. His work included numerous Roman Catholic churches commissioned by Polish landowners and Catholic communities across the western provinces of the Russian Empire.

Wyganowski’s architectural output is associated mainly with the Neo-Gothic style, close to the Vistula-Baltic Gothic popular in the Congress Poland. Around 1906, Wyganowski returned to his family estate in Kotra. The circumstances and exact date of his death are unknown, though he is known to have been alive after 1913.

== Selected works ==
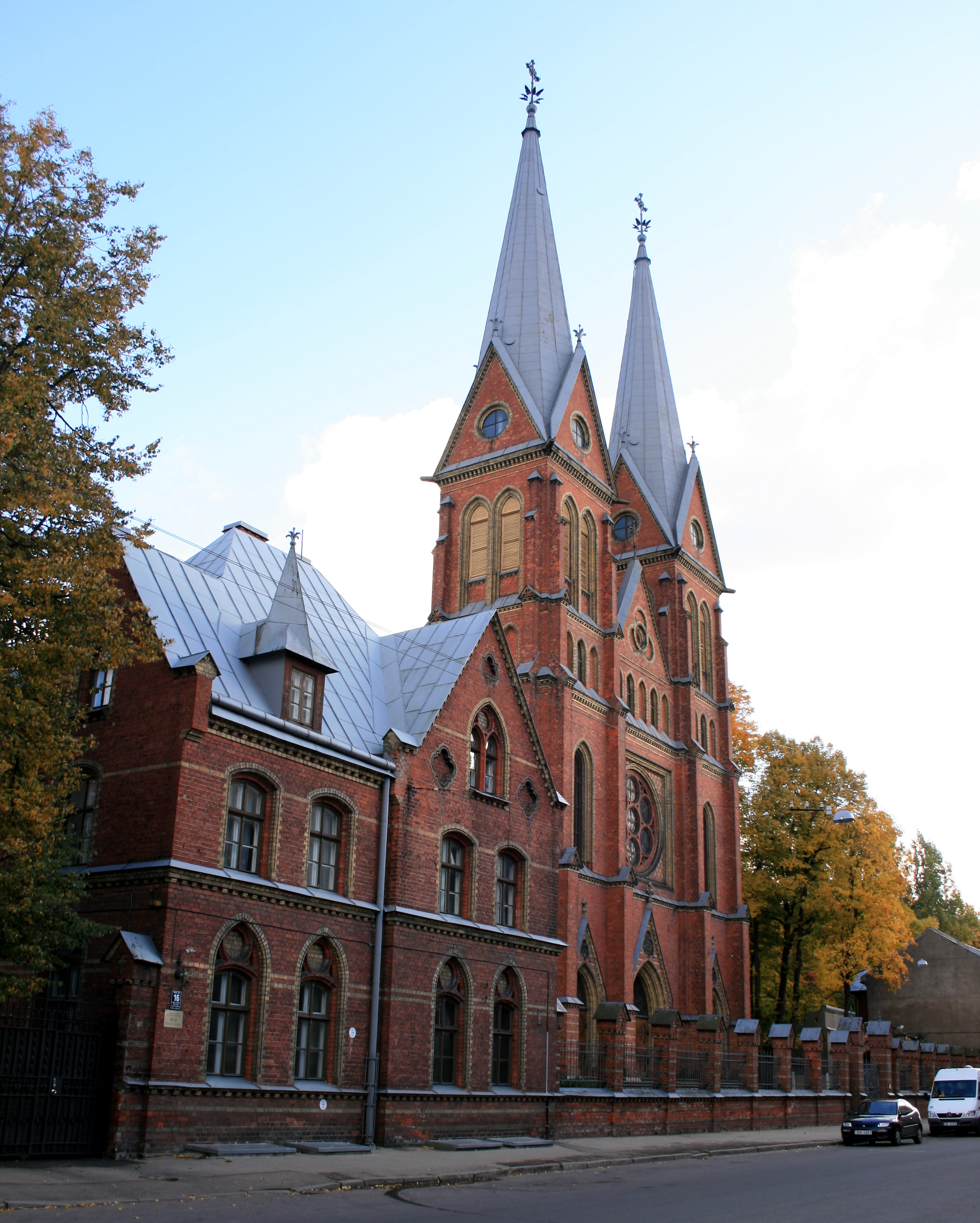
Church of St. Francis in Riga

- Church of the Sacred Heart of Jesus, Viļaka in Viļaka (built 1884–1890, consecrated 1891)
- St. Francis Church in Riga
- Sacred Heart Cathedral in Rēzekne
- Church of St. Casimir in Kamajai
- Church of St. Matthew in Naujamiestis, Panevėžys
- Church of the Holy Trinity in Pabiržė
- Church of St. Joseph in Panemunėlis
- All Saints Church in Josvainiai
- Church of the Assumption in Krekenava
- Churches in present-day Belarus, including Olkovichi and Kamionka
