= Kairiai =

- Town
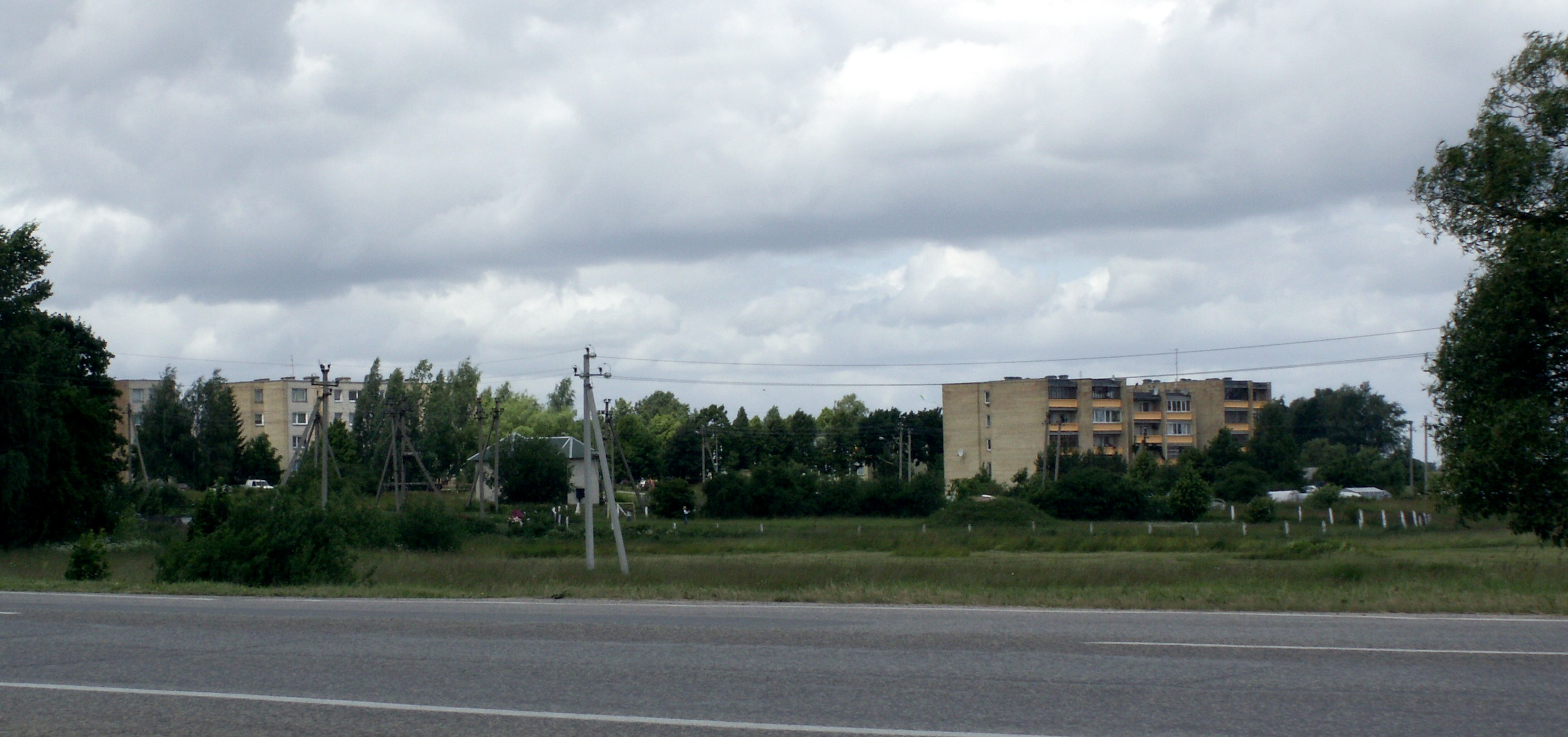

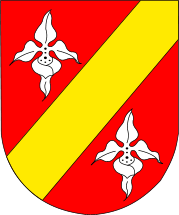
- Coat of arms

- Location in Lithuania
- Coordinates: 55°55′0″N 23°26′20″E
- Country: Lithuania
- Ethnographic region: Samogitia
- County: Šiauliai County

Population (2015)
  - Total: 3,485
- Time zone: UTC+2 (EET)
  - Summer (DST): UTC+3 (EEST)

Kairiai is a small town in Šiauliai County in northern-central Lithuania. As of 2015 it had a population of 3485.
