= Mikołaj Stanisław Oborski =

Polish jesuit and writer

- Born: 1576; Mazovia, Poland
- Died: 12 October 1646 (aged 69–70); Kraków

Mikołaj Stanisław Oborski (1576–1646) was a Polish Jesuit and writer.

Oborski joined the Jesuit Order in 1602 where he ran several Jesuit colleges in Poland and investigated the miracles of Stanislaus Kostka.

== Works ==
- Aquila grandis Martinus Oborski, Palatinus Podlachiae, Warszawa 1603;
- Relacja albo krótkie opisanie cudów niektórych błogosławionego Stanisława Kostki, Kraków 1603;
- Wypis z procesu kanonizacji św. Stanisława Kostki.
