= Bolesław Hieronim Kłopotowski =

Roman Catholic archbishop (1848 – 1903)

- Archbishop of Mohilev
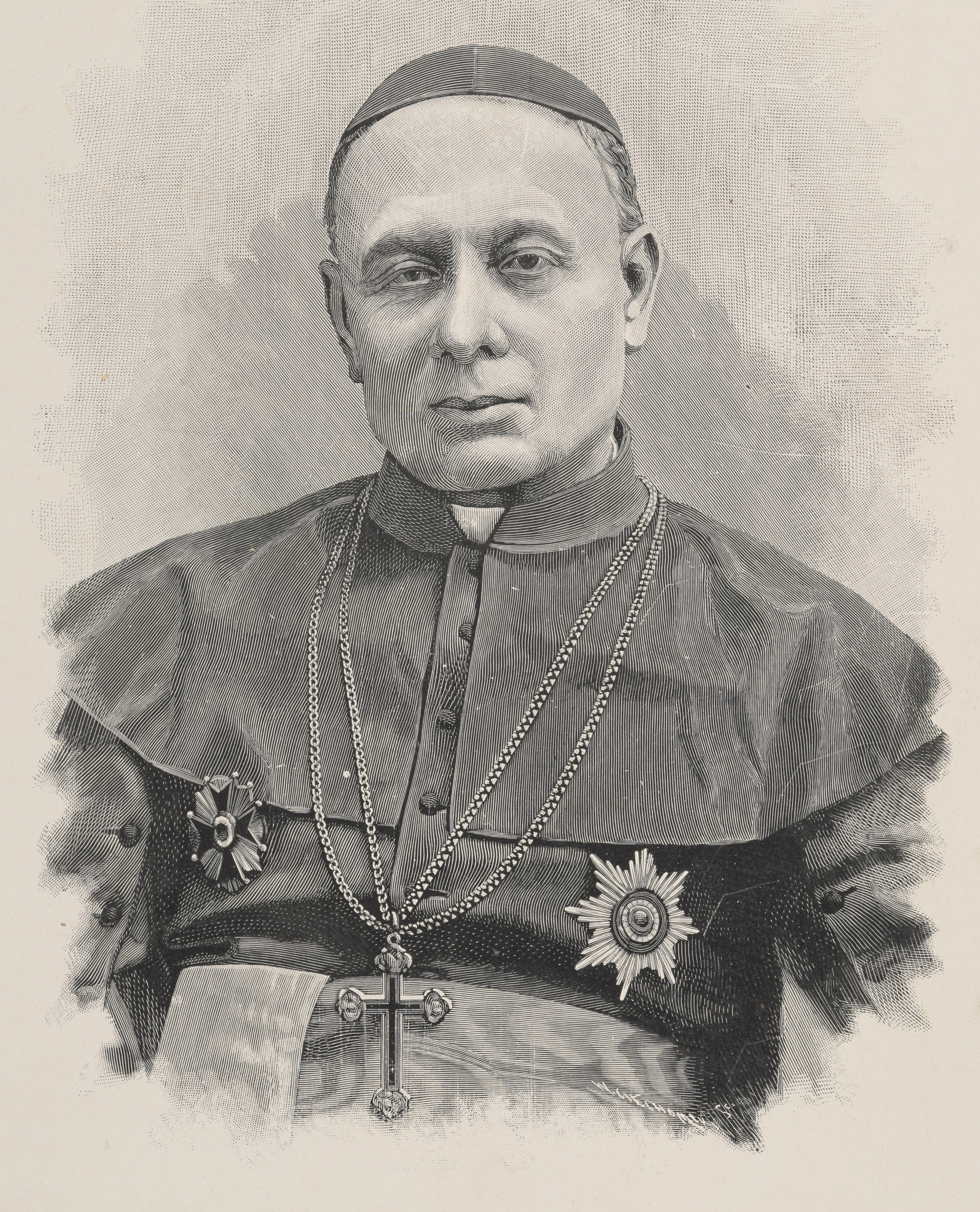
- Appointed: 15 April 1901
- Predecessor: Szymon Marcin Kozłowski
- Successor: Jerzy Józef Szembek
- Previous posts: Bishop of Lutsk and Zhytomyr (1900 – 1901); Auxiliary bishop of Lutsk and Zhytomyr (1897 – 1899); Titular bishop of Eleutheropolis (1897 – 1899)

Orders
- Ordination: 15 July 1872
- Consecration: 21 November 1897 by Mečislovas Leonardas Paliulionis

Personal details
- Born: 13 March 1848 Sharhorod
- Died: 24 February 1903 (aged 54) St. Petersburg

Bolesław Hieronim Kłopotowski (13 March 1848 – 24 February 1903) was a Roman Catholic Archbishop of Mohilev from 1901 until his death in 1903.

== Biography ==
Kłopotowski was born near Sharhorod. He was first educated in Zlatopil and Kiev. He began attending the diocesan seminary in Zhytomyr in 1865; he was confirmed while in Zhytomyr on 25 February 1866. He received a tonsure and was ordained to minor orders on 11 March 1867, followed by his ordination to the subdiaconate on 15 March 1869. In the same year, he was sent to the Saint Petersburg Roman Catholic Theological Academy, graduating with a magister's degree in theology on 19 January 1874. During this period, he was ordained to the deaconate on 26 June 1872 and was also ordained as a priest on 15 July 1872.

In 1874, Kłopotowski was appointed a professor of the diocesan seminary of Zhytomyr, where he taught the Latin language as well as moral theology and church history. He was later appointed a professor of the Saint Petersburg Roman Catholic Theological Academy on 17 December 1877, where he taught church history and canon law for 20 years. Kłopotowski was awarded the Order of Saint Stanislaus, 3rd class, in May 1883, and was appointed inspector for the Academy on 23 August 1884. After the exile of Franciszek Albin Symon to Odessa, Kłopotowski was appointed rector of the Academy on 23 August 1897; he served as rector until 24 November of the same year. While working at the Academy, he published the Compendium Historicae Ecclesiae, a three-volume work inspired by the work of G. Henry Wouters that covered the first 7 centuries of church history.

In 1885, Kłopotowski was appointed a titular canon of the cathedral chapter of the Diocese of Lutsk and Zhytomyr. In the same year, he became a Doctor of Canon Law. He was appointed auxiliary bishop of Lutsk and Zhytomyr, as well as titular bishop of Eleutheropolis, by Pope Leo XIII on 2 August 1897; he was consecrated on 21 November 1897 in the Catholic Church of St. Catherine of Alexandria by Mečislovas Leonardas Paliulionis, co-consecrated by Antanas Baranauskas and Kazimierz Ruszkiewicz. He was made vicar capitular of the Diocese of Lutsk and Zhytomyr on 14 June 1898 and was also appointed apostolic administrator of the Diocese of Kamianets in 1899.

In early 1900, Kłopotowski was appointed bishop of Lutsk and Zhytomyr. He was appointed archbishop of Mohilev on 15 April 1901, receiving his pallium in the Church of St. Catherine in Saint Petersburg on 23 June of the same year. He died on 24 February 1903 in St. Petersburg from pneumonia; his funeral took place on 28 February 1903.
