= Diocese of Lutsk =

Latin Catholic diocese in Ukraine

Diocese of Lutsk Dioecesis Luceoriensis Єпархія Луцьку

Catholic
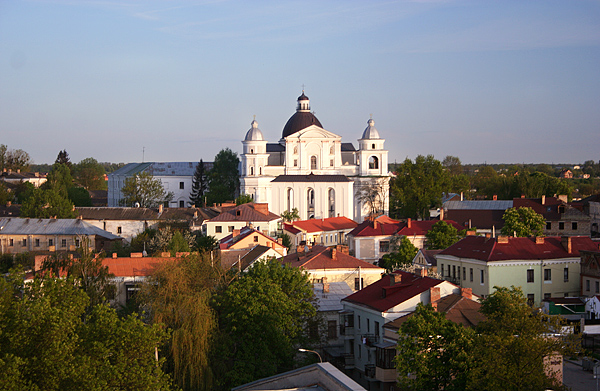

Location
- Country: Ukraine
- Ecclesiastical province: Lviv
- Metropolitan: Lviv

Statistics
- Area: 40,300 km^{2} (15,600 sq mi)
- Population: Total; Catholics: (as of 2013); 2,211,000; 25,000 (1.1%)

Information
- Denomination: Catholic
- Sui iuris church: Latin Church
- Rite: Roman Rite
- Established: 1404
- Cathedral: Saint Peter and Paul Cathedral, Lutsk

Current leadership
- Pope: Leo XIV
- Bishop: Vitaliy Skomarovskyi
- Metropolitan Archbishop: Mieczysław Mokrzycki
- Bishops emeritus: Markijan Trofimiak

The Diocese of Lutsk was first established in the 13th century as the diocese of Luceoria (Latin) or Łuck (Polish). After the victory of Napoleon, the diocese was joined with the Diocese of Zhytomyr, forming the diocese of Lutzk-Zhitomir-Kamenetz. (suffragan see of the Archdiocese of Mohilev between 1798 and 1925). In 1925, the diocese of Lutsk was restored and the Diocese of Zhytomyr became separate.

== Ordinaries ==
- Izydor (1375–1380, bishop of Volodymyr
- Hynek (Hynko) Zając z Hasenburga (1371–1388)
- Rugan (1380–1400, bishop of Volodymyr
- Mikołaj (ca. 1388/1390–1400)
- Grzegorz z Buczkowa (1400–ca.1424), bishop of Volodymyr
- Świętosław (1404–1409)
- Andrzej Spławski (1425–ca.1453), moved from Volodymyr to Lutsk
- Matthias of Trakai (1453)
- Wacław Raczkowicz (1459–1460/1462)
- Jonas I Losovičius (1463–1468)
- Marcin Kreszowski (1468–?)
- Stanisław Stawski (1483–ca.1488)
- Jan Andruszewicz Pudełko (1493–1499)
- Wojciech Radziwiłł (1500–1507)
- Paweł Algimunt Holszański (1507–1535)
- Jerzy Chwalczewski (1535–1547)
- Walerian Protasewicz (1547–1555)
- Jan Andruszewicz (1563–1579)
- Wiktoryn Wierzbicki (1579–1588)
- Bernard Maciejowski (1590–1600)
- Stanisław Gomoliński (1600–1604)
- Marcin Szyszkowski (1604–1607)
- Paweł Wołłowicz (1607–1608)
- Paweł Wołucki (1608–1616)
- Henryk Firlej (1616–1618)
- Andrzej Lipski (1618–1622)
- Stanisław Lubieński (1624–1627)
- Achacy Grochowski (1627–1633)
- Bogusław Radoszewski (1633–1638)
- Andrzej Gembicki (1638–1655)
- Jan Zamoyski (1655)
- Jan Stefan Wydżga (1655–1659)
- Mikołaj Prażmowski (1659–1666)
- Tomasz Łaszeński (1667–1675))
- Stanisław Dąmbski (1675–1680)
- Stanisław Witwicki (1680–1688)
- Bogusław Leszczyński (1688–1691)
- Franciszek Michał Prażmowski (1691–1701)
- Aleksander Wyhowski (1703–1714)
- Joachim Przebendowski (1714–1721)
- Stefan Bogusław Rupniewski (1721–1731)
- Jan Aleksander Lipski (1731–1736)
- Andrzej Stanisław Załuski (1736–1739)
- Franciszek Antoni Kobielski (1739–1755)
- Antoni Erazm Wołłowicz (1755–1769)
- Feliks Paweł Turski (1769–1790)
- Adam Stanisław Naruszewicz (1790–1798)
- Kacper Kazimierz Cieciszowski (1798–1827)
- Michał Piwnicki (1827–1845)
- Kacper Borowski (1848–1871)
- Szymon Marcin Kozłowski (1883–1898)
- Cyryl Lubowidzki (1897–1898)
- Bolesław Hieronim Kłopotowski (1899–1901)
- Karol Antoni Niedziałkowski (1901–1911)
- Ignacy Dubowski (1916–1925)
- Adolf Szelążek (1926–1950)
- Vacant (1951–1998)
- Markijan Trofimiak (1998–2012)
- Vacant (2012–2014)
- Vitaliy Skomarovskyi (2014–present)

== Auxiliary bishops ==
- Stanisław Udrzycki (1617–1621)
- Franciszek Zajerski (1622–1631)
- Stanisław Łoza (1632–1639)
- Mikołaj Krasicki (1639–1652)
- Stanisław Czuryło (1659–1661)
- Jan Karol Czolański (1662–1664)
- Kazimierz Zwierz (1664–1682)
- Stanisław Bedliński (1683–1689)
- Stefan Antonin Mdzewski (1690–1699)
- Adam Franciszek Ksawery Rostkowski (1700–1738)
- Hieronim Antoni Szeptycki (1739–1759)
- Ludwik Ignacy Riaucour (1749–1777)
- Franciszek Kobielski (1760–1766)
- Franciszek Komornicki (1774–1780)
- Jan Szyjkowski (1775–1797)
- Jan Chryzostom Kaczkowski (1781–1816)
- Adam Kłokocki (1795–1808)
- Jan Kanty Podhorodeński (1804–1832)
- Cyril Lubowidzki (1884–1897), Appointed Bishop of Lutsk
- Bolesław Hieronim Kłopotowski (1897–1899), Appointed Bishop of Lutsk
- Antanas Karosas (1906–1910)
- Longinus Żarnowiecki (1910–1915)
- Michał Godlewski (1916–1949)
- Stefan Walczykiewicz (1928–1940)
