= Szymon Marcin Kozłowski =

Roman Catholic bishop

- Archbishop of Mohilev
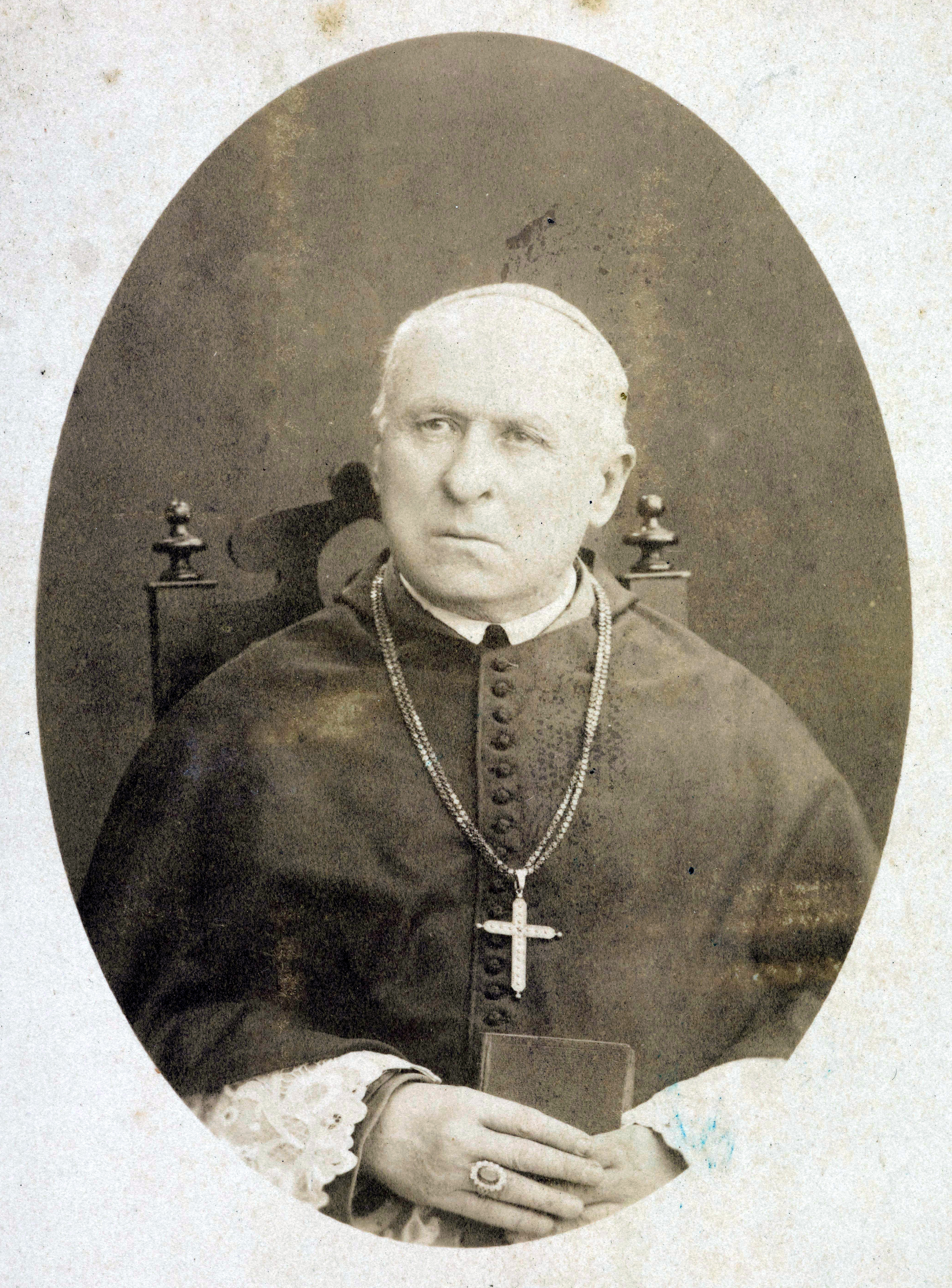
- Appointed: 17 December 1891
- Predecessor: Aleksander Gintowt-Dziewałtowski
- Successor: Bolesław Hieronim Kłopotowski
- Other post: Bishop of Lutsk and Zytomyr (1883–1891)

Orders
- Ordination: 23 December 1844 by Kazimierz Dmochowski
- Consecration: 13 May 1883 by Aleksander Kazimierz Bereśniewicz

Personal details
- Born: 5 November 1819 Alytus
- Died: 17 November 1889 (aged 70) St. Petersburg

Szymon Marcin Kozłowski (Lithuanian: Simonas Kozlovskis; 5 November 1819 – 17 November 1889) was an Archbishop of Mohilev.

== Biography ==
Kozłowski was born in Alytus to Jan and Madgalena Kozłowski. In 1839 – after completing schooling in Kėdainiai – he began to study at the theological seminary in Vilnius. In 1841, after receiving a tonsure, he began to study theology at the theological academy in Vilnius. He later moved to St. Petersburg in 1842 to continue his studies. He was made a subdeacon on 14 September 1844 and a deacon on 23 September; he was ordained a priest on 23 December in St. Petersburg by Kazimierz Dmochowski. He completed his education at the Saint Petersburg Roman Catholic Theological Academy in 1845 with a magister's in theology, graduating with sumna cum laude honors.

In 1846, Kozłowski was made professor of moral theology and homiletics at the Vilnius Theological Academy. In 1848, he was appointed a professor of church history and canon law at the Saint Petersburg Roman Catholic Theological Academy. He was later made rector of the Vilnius Theological Academy in 1851. While working as rector, he was made an honorary canon in 1852. In 1862, he was awarded a doctorate in theology from the Saint Petersburg Roman Catholic Theological Academy.

On 28 March 1883, Kozłowski was appointed Bishop of Lutsk and Zytomyr by Leo XIII; he was consecrated on 13 May 1883 in the Church of St. Catherine by Aleksander Kazimierz Bereśniewicz, bishop of Włocławek, assisted by Tomasz Teofil Kuliński, bishop of Kielce, and Karol Hryniewiecki, bishop of Vilnius. His ingress took place at Lutsk on 7 July 1883. On 17 December 1891, he was appointed Archbishop of Mohilev. He died on 14 November 1899 and was buried at a cemetery in St. Petersburg on 17 November.
