= Jan Leszczyński (footballer, born 1946) =

Polish footballer (1946–2004)

Personal information
- Full name: Jan Edward Leszczyński
- Date of birth: 20 October 1946
- Place of birth: Sosnowiec, Poland
- Date of death: 13 January 2004 (aged 57)
- Place of death: Sosnowiec, Poland
- Position: Right-back

Youth career
- 1958–1964: Stal Sosnowiec

Senior career*
Years	Team	Apps	(Gls)
1964–1977	Zagłębie Sosnowiec	253	(2)
Total		253	(2)

International career
	Poland U23	17	(1)
1968	Poland	1	(0)
- * Club domestic league appearances and goals

Jan Edward Leszczyński (20 October 1946 – 13 January 2004) was a Polish footballer who played as a right-back. He made one appearance for the Poland national team in 1968.

== Honours ==
Zagłębie Sosnowiec

- Polish Cup: 1976–77, 1977–78
