= Andrzej Gembicki =

Polish bishop

His Excellency Andrzej Gembicki
- Bishop
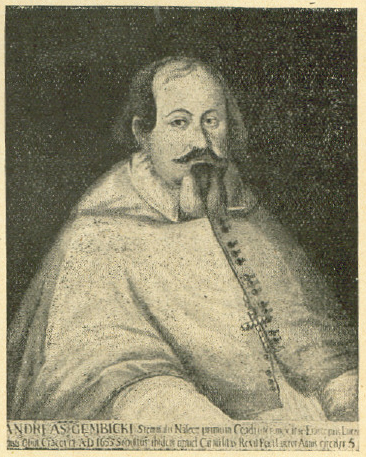
- Church: Roman Catholic
- Archdiocese: Gniezno
- Installed: 1638
- Term ended: 1654

Personal details
- Died: 1654
- Coat of arms

Andrzej Gembicki of Nałęcz (died in 1654 in Janów Podlaski) - Roman Catholic bishop, auxiliary bishop of Gniezno in the years 1628–1638, diocesan bishop of Łuck in the years 1638–1654, canon of the cathedral chapter of Gniezno, abbot of Tremesno.
