= Bishop of Vilnius =

Bishops of Vilnius diocese from 1388 and archdiocese (archdiocese of Vilnius) from 1925:

Bishops suffragans – diocese period
Andrzej Jastrzębiec OFM	1388 – 14 November 1398	
Jakub Plichta OFM	5 May 1399 – 7 February 1407	
Mikołaj Gorzkowski	January 1408 – 1414	
Piotr Krakowczyk	15 February 1415 – 22 December 1422	
Matthias of Trakai	4 May 1422 – 9 May 1453	
Nicholas of Šalčininkai	17 October 1453 – 29 September 1467	
Jonas I Losovičius	4 May 1468 – 1481	
Andrzej II	27 August 1481 – 1491	
Wojciech Tabor	1 April 1492 – 27 March 1507	
Albert Radziwiłł	10 September 1507 – 19 April 1519	
John of the Lithuanian Dukes	23 September 1519 – 15 March 1536	
Paweł (prince) Holszański	15 March 1536 – 4 September 1555	
Walerian Protasewicz	10 April 1556 – 31 December 1579	
Jerzy Radziwiłł	31 December 1579 – 9 August 1591	
Benedykt Woyna	31 July 1600 – 22 October 1615	
Eustachy Wołłowicz	18 May 1616 – 19 January 1630	
Abraham Woyna	24 March 1631 – 14 April 1649	
Jerzy Tyszkiewicz	9 December 1649 – 17 January 1656	
Jan Karol Dowgiałło Zawisza	16 October 1656 – 9 March 1661	
Jerzy Białłozor	21 November 1661 – 17 May 1665	
Aleksander Kazimierz Sapieha	18 July 1667 – 22 May 1671	
Mikołaj Stefan Pac	22 May 1672 – 8 May 1684	
Aleksander Kotowicz	9 April 1685 – 30 November 1686	
Konstanty Kazimierz Brzostowski	24 November 1687 – 24 October 1722	
Maciej Ancuta	24 October 1722 – 18 January 1723	
Karol Piotr Pancerzyński	11 September 1724 – 19 February 1729	
Michał Jan Zienkowicz	2 October 1730 – 23 January 1762	
Ignacy Jakub Massalski	29 March 1762 – 28 June 1794	
Jan Nepomucen Kossakowski	9 August 1798 – 26 August 1808	
Hieronim Stroynowski	26 September 1814 – 5 August 1815	
Andrzej Benedykt Kłągiewicz	14 December 1840 – 27 December 1841	
Wacław Żyliński	3 July 1848 – 27 October 1856	
Adam Stanisław Krasiński	27 September 1858 – 15 March 1883	
Karol Hryniewiecki	15 March 1883 – 30 December 1889	
Antoni Franciszek Audziewicz	30 December 1889 – 10 June 1895	
Stefan Aleksander Zwierowicz	21 July 1897 – 2 September 1902	
Edward Ropp	9 November 1903 – 25 July 1917	
Jurgis Matulaitis-Matulevičius (Jerzy Matulewicz)	23 October 1918 – 14 July 1925	
Metropolitan Archbishops – Archdiocese period
Jan Cieplak	14 December 1925 – 17 February 1926	nominated, died before taking the office
Romuald Jałbrzykowski	24 June 1926 – 19 June 1955	imprisoned by Germans 1942 – 1944, from 1945 seated in Białystok
Julijonas Steponavičius	7 February 1989 – 18 June 1991	apostolic administrator of Vilnius since 8 December 1957
Audrys Juozas Bačkis	24 December 1991 – 5 April 2013	cardinal
Gintaras Grušas	23 April 2013 – present	

== Auxiliary bishops ==
- Cyprian Wiliński (Wiliski), O.P. (3 Mar 1572 – 1594)
- Nicolas Pac (Mikalojus Pacas)(Mikołaj Pac) (9 Sep 1602 – 29 Mar 1610)
- Abraham Wojna (Abraomas Voina) (25 May 1611 – 20 Jul 1626 Appointed, Bishop of Žemaičiai)
- Jerzy Tyszkiewicz (Jurgis Tiškevičius) (17 May 1627 – 19 Dec 1633 Appointed, Bishop of Žemaičiai)
- Stanislaw Nieborski (12 Jun 1634 – 27 May 1644)
- Hieronim Wladysław Sanguszko, S.J. (12 Dec 1644 – 31 May 1655)
- Theodorus Skuminowicz (Skumin) (12 Aug 1652 – 24 Sep 1668)
- Aleksander Kazimierz Sapieha (2 Aug 1655 – 12 Jan 1660 Appointed, Bishop of Žemaičiai)
- Gothard Jan Tyzenhaus (Gotthard Johann von Tiesenhausen) (5 Apr 1661 – 17 Sep 1668)
- Mikolaj Słupski (3 Jun 1669 – 1691)
- Vladislaus Silnicki (15 Feb 1683 – 8 Feb 1692)
- Jonas Jeronimas Krišpinas (30 Aug 1694 – 19 Sep 1695)
- Jan Mikolaj Zgierski (2 Jan 1696 – 25 Jan 1706)
- Wojciech Izdebski (18 Jun 1696 – 3 Nov 1702)
- Aleksander Mikolaj Horain (15 Sep 1704 – 23 Dec 1711)
- Maciej Józef Ancuta (1 Oct 1710 – 14 Jun 1717 Appointed, Coadjutor Bishop of Vilnius)
- Karol Piotr Pancerzyński (5 Oct 1712 – 31 May 1721 Appointed, Bishop of Smoleńsk on 11 Sep 1724)
- Bogusław Korwin Gosiewski (20 Apr 1722 – 29 Jan 1725)
- Georgius Casimirus Ancuta (27 Sep 1723 – 26 Sep 1737)
- Antoni Józef Żółkowski (7 Dec 1744 – 19 Jan 1763)
- Tomasz Ignacy Zienkowicz (21 Jul 1755 – 19 Nov 1781)
- Józef Kazimierz Kossakowski (13 Mar 1775 – 17 Sep 1781 Appointed, Bishop of Inflanty)
- Jan Stefan Giedroyć (22 Aug 1763 – 22 Apr 1765)
- Tadeusz Benedykt Feliks Towiański, O.F.M. Conv. (1 Dec 1766 - )
- Stanislaw Jan Siestrzencewicz Bohusz (12 Jul 1773 – 11 Dec 1783)
- Franciszek Alojzy Junosza Gzowski (23 Sep 1782 – 1786)
- Piotr Aleksander Samson Toczyłowski (23 Sep 1782 – 14 Dec 1793)
- David Pilchowski (1 Jun 1795 – 22 Dec 1803)
- Jerzy Połubiński (27 Jun 1796 – 1801)
- Ignacy Houwalt (20 Aug 1804 – 5 May 1807)
- Andrzej Chołoniewski (20 Aug 1804 – 1819)
- Nikodem Puzyna (26 Sep 1814 – 22 Oct 1819)
- Tadeusz Kundzicz (10 Jul 1815 – 15 Jan 1829)
- Andrzej Benedykt Kłągiewicz (15 Mar 1830, Appointed Bishop of Vilnius)
- Jan Cywiński (17 Dec 1840 – 17 Nov 1846)
- Kazimierz Roch Dmochowski (17 Dec 1840 – 3 Jul 1848)
- Kazimierz Mikołaj Michalkiewicz (12 Jan 1923 – 16 Feb 1940)
- Mečislovas Reinys (18 Jul 1940 – 8 Nov 1953)
- Władysław Suszyński (19 Jan 1948 Appointed, Apostolic Administrator of Vilnius on 3 Jul 1968)
- Juozas Tunaitis (8 May 1991 – 4 Mar 2010)
- Jonas Algimantas Boruta, S.J. (28 May 1997 – 5 Jan 2002)
- Edward Ozorowski (31 Jan 1979 – 5 Jun 1991)
- Arūnas Poniškaitis (5 Feb 2010)
