= Roman Catholic Diocese of Smolensk =

Former Latin Catholic diocese in Russia

Diocese of Smolensk Dioecesis Smolenscensis
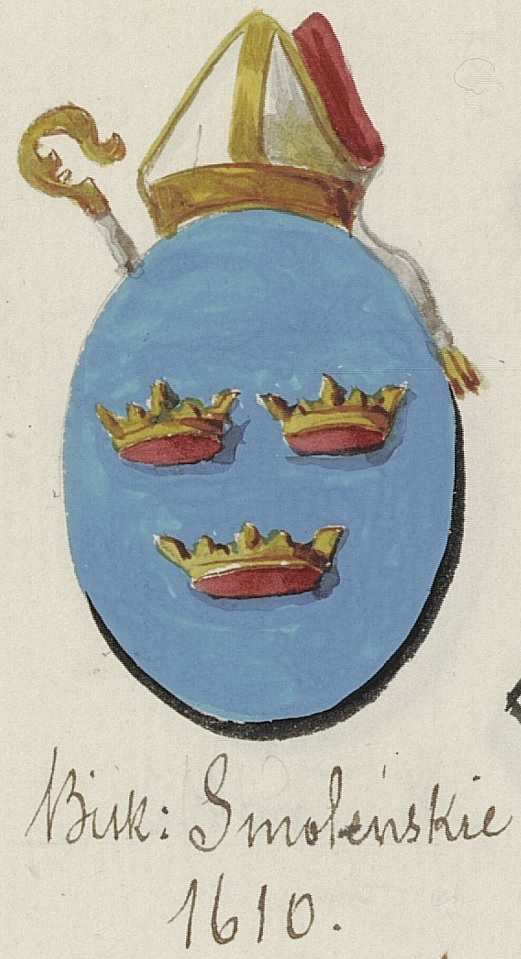
- Coat of arms

Location
- Country: Polish–Lithuanian Commonwealth/Russia
- Ecclesiastical province: Gniezno

Information
- Denomination: Catholic Church
- Sui iuris church: Latin Church
- Rite: Roman Rite
- Established: 1636
- Dissolved: 1818

The Diocese of Smolensk was a Latin Church ecclesiastical territory or diocese of the Catholic Church. Founded in 1636 and dissolved in 1818, it was initially located within the Polish–Lithuanian Commonwealth, and later in Czarist Russia.

== History ==
The Latin Church bishopric was established in 1611 by King Sigismund III Vasa when Smolensk was occupied by the Polish army after the long siege of Smolensk. Its foundation was confirmed by the Sejm of the Polish–Lithuanian Commonwealth in 1618, however the first bishop Piotr Parczewski was appointed only in 1636. The see rather often served as a stepping stone to be transferred to other bishoprics in the Polish–Lithuanian Commonwealth. Initially, the territory of the diocese formed part of the Polish–Lithuanian Commonwealth, however, after the Truce of Andrusovo of 1667 it passed to Russia. Since then, the bishops of Smolensk resided in Warsaw. In the XVIII century the Diocese had only three parishes, all in the Polish territory, and 10,000 faithfuls.

On 15 April 1783, it lost all of its territory due to the establishment of the Metropolitan Archdiocese of Mohilev (but having still a chapel and temporalities in Warsaw until 1807-1809).

In 1818, it was formally suppressed and its territory canonically merged into the Metropolitan Archdiocese of Mohilev, which would be merged in 1991 with the Diocese of Minsk into the Metropolitan Archdiocese of Minsk-Mohilev at the dismemberment of the Soviet Union, so as to cover independent Belarus.

The Catholics in Smolensk are now part of the parish of the Immaculate Conception Church in the Archdiocese of the Mother of God in Moscow.

== Episcopal ordinaries ==
Suffragan Bishops of Smolensk

- Piotr Parczewski (1636.09.01 – 1649.12.09), later Bishop of Samogitia (Lithuania) (1649.12.09 – death 1658.12.06)
- Franciszek Dołmat Isajkowski (1650.02.14 – death 1654.05)
- Hieronim Władysław Sanguszko, Jesuits (S.J.) (1655.05.31 – 1657.07); previously Titular Bishop of Modon (1644.12.12 – 1655.05.31) as Auxiliary Bishop of Vilnius (Lithuania) (1644.12.12 – 1655.05.31)
- Jerzy Białłozor (1658.03.18 – 1661.11.21), next Bishop of Vilnius (Lithuania) (1661.11.21 – death 1665.05.17)
- Kazimierz Pac (1664.01.14 – 1667.10.03), next Bishop of Samogitia (Lithuania) (1667.10.03 – death 1695)
- Gothard Jan Tyzenhaus (1668.09.17 – 1669), previously Titular Bishop of Modon (1661.04.05 – 1668.09.17) as Auxiliary Bishop of Vilnius (Lithuania) (1661.04.05 – 1668.09.17)
- Aleksander Kotowicz (1673.02.27 – 1685.04.09), next Bishop of Vilnius (Lithuania) (1685.04.09 – death 1686.11.30)
- Konstanty Kazimierz Brzostowski (1685.04.30 – 1687.11.24), next Bishop of Vilnius (Lithuania) (1687.11.24 – death 1722.10.24)
- Eustachy Stanisław Kazimierz Kotowicz (1688.05.17 – death 1704)
- Jan Mikołaj Zgierski (1706.01.25 – 1710.07.21); previously Titular Bishop of Martiria (1696.01.02 – 1706.01.25) as Auxiliary Bishop of Vilnius (Lithuania) (1696.01.02 – 1710.07.21); later Bishop of Samogitia (Lithuania) (1710.07.21 – death 1713.12.06)
- Aleksander Mikołaj Horain (1711.12.23 – 1716.12.07); previously Titular Bishop of Tiberias (1704.09.15 – 1711.12.23) as Auxiliary Bishop of Vilnius (Lithuania) (1704.09.15 – 1711.12.23); later Bishop of Samogitia (Lithuania) (1716.12.07 – death 1735.12.07)
- Ludwik Karol Ogiński (1717.11.22 – death 1718)
- Karol Piotr Pancerzyński (1721.09.24 – 1724.09.11); previously Titular Bishop of Hierapolis (1712.10.05 – 1721.09.24) as Auxiliary Bishop of Vilnius (Lithuania) (1712.10.05 – 1721.09.24), succeeded as Bishop of Vilnius (1724.09.11 – death 1729.02.19)

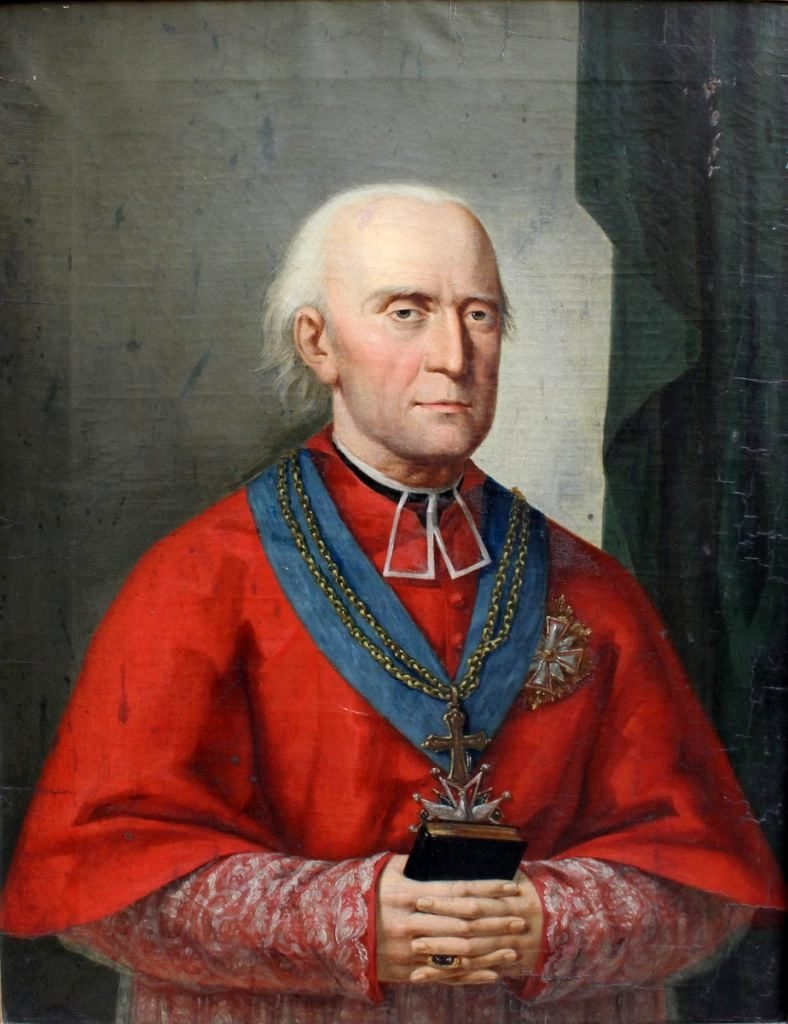
Tymoteusz Paweł Gorzeński, last Bishop of Smolensk

- Bogusław Korwin Gosiewski (1725.01.29 – death 1744.06.24), previously Titular Bishop of Achantus (1722.04.20 – 1725.01.29) as Auxiliary Bishop of Vilnius (Lithuania) (1722.04.20 – 1725.01.29)
- Jerzy Mikołaj Hylzen (1746.02.13 – 1763.07.17), died 1775
- Gabriel Wodzyński (1763.07.17 – death 1788.11.28), succeeded as previous Coadjutor Bishop of Smoleńsk (1759.04.04 – 1763.07.17) and Titular Bishop of Theveste (1759.04.04 – 1763.07.17)
- Adam Naruszewicz, S.J. (1788.11.28 – 1790.11.29), succeeding as previous Coadjutor Bishop of Smoleńsk (1775.03.13 – 1788.11.28) and Titular Bishop of Emmaus (1775.03.13 – 1788.11.28); later Bishop of Łuck (Poland) (1790.11.29 – death 1796.07.08)
- Tymoteusz Paweł Gorzeński (1790.11.29 – 1809.03.27), later Bishop of Poznań (then South Prussia and later Duchy of Warsaw) ([1806.09.09] 1809.03.27 – 1821.07.16), Metropolitan Archbishop of Gniezno and Poznań (then Grand Duchy of Posen) (1821.07.16 – death 1825.12.20)
