= Bishop of Smolensk =

Bishop of Smolensk is an ecclesiastical title that may refer to a bishopric (diocese or eparchy) in the following Christian churches:

- Roman Catholic Diocese of Smolensk
- Bishop of Smolensk (Roman Catholic)
- Ruthenian Catholic Archeparchy of Smolensk
- Russian Orthodox Diocese of Smolensk
