= Vaina (surname) =

- Lithuanian surname
- m.: Vaina
- f.: (unmarried): Vainaitė
- f.: (married): Vainienė

Vaina is a surname of several origins.

It may be a Lithuanian-language surname and a given name. As a given name, it is a diminutive for Vainoras or Vainora (which can also be surnames). The corresponding Polish-language surnames are Wojna nd Woyna.

Notable people with the surname include:

- Abraomas Vaina (1569–1649), Roman Catholic priest and auxiliary bishop of Vilnius, bishop of Samogitia (1626–1631), and bishop of Vilnius
- Antanas Juozapas Vaina (?–1747), a dignitary of Grand Duchy of Lithuania, notarius magnus Lithuaniae
- Benediktas Vaina (?–1615), bishop of Vilnius
- Laurynas Vaina (?–1500), statesman in Grand Duchy of Lithuania; held various high positions, including Treasurer of the Lithuanian Court and Treasurer of the Lithuanian Lands
- Vladimír Vaina (1909–1996), Czech rower

== See also ==
- Väina
