= Wojna =

Wojna is a surname. Notable people with the surname include:

- Abrahan Wojna, Spelling variant of Abraham Woyna, Roman Catholic priest, bishop of Vilnius (and other offices)
- Ed Wojna (born 1960), American baseball pitcher
- Valerie Wojna, Puerto Rican neurologist

== See also ==
- Woyna
- Vaina
