= Vištytis =

Town in Suvalkija Region, Lithuania

- Town
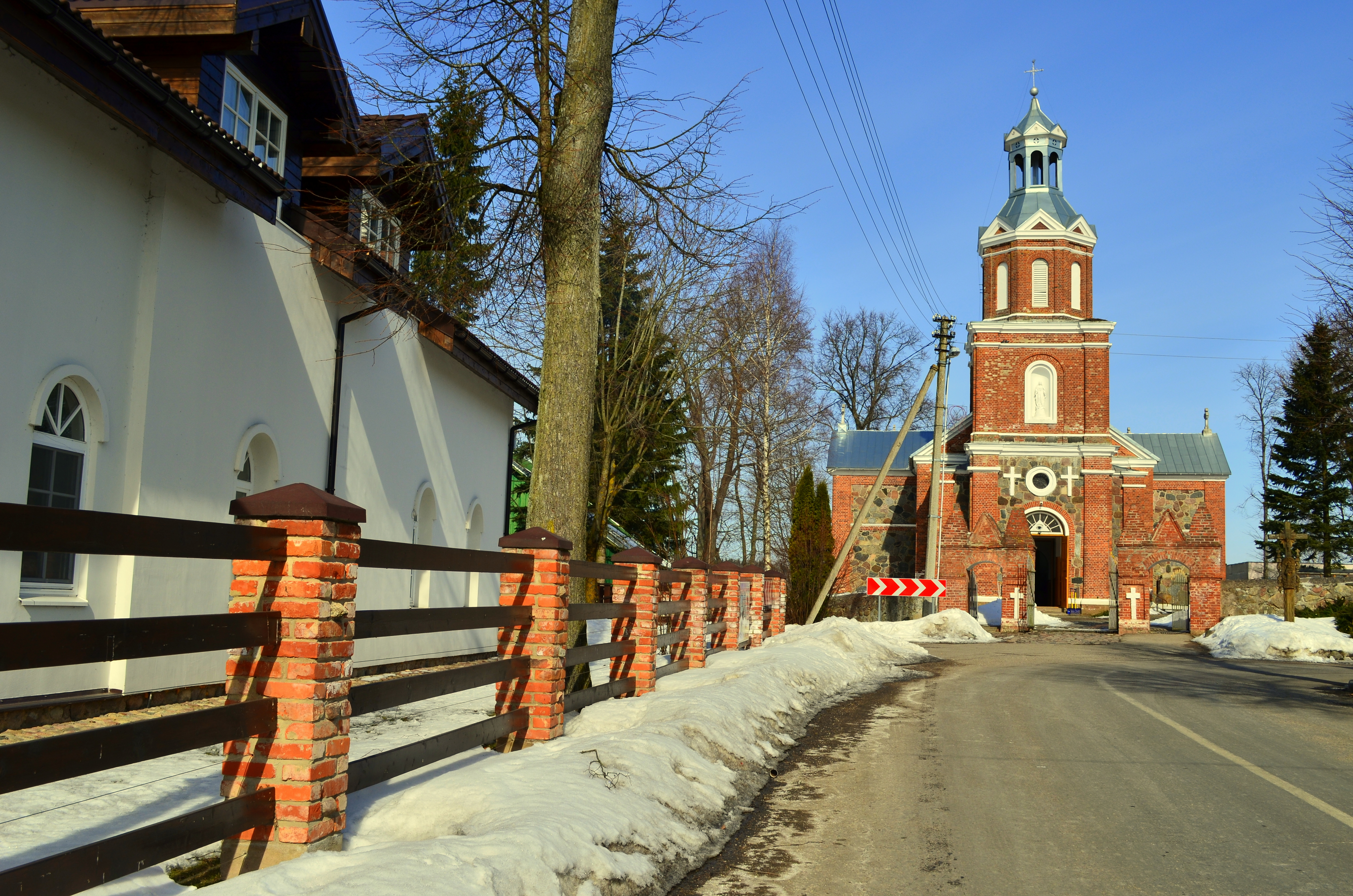
- Catholic church

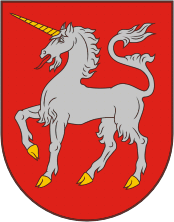
- Coat of arms
- Interactive map of Vištytis
- Location within Lithuania
- Coordinates: 54°27′30″N 22°43′10″E
- Country: Lithuania
- Ethnographic region: Suvalkija
- County: Marijampolė County
- Municipality: Vilkaviškis district municipality
- Eldership: Vištytis eldership
- First mentioned: 1538
- Town rights: 1570

Area
  - Total: 0.168 km^{2} (0.065 sq mi)

Population (2011)
  - Total: 436
- Time zone: UTC+2 (EET)
  - Summer (DST): UTC+3 (EEST)
- Website: Website

Vištytis (Polish: Wisztyniec, Yiddish: ווישטינעץ Vishtinets) is a small town in Marijampolė County, Vilkaviškis District Municipality in southwestern Lithuania on the border with Russia and close to the border with Poland. It is the administrative center of Vištytis eldership (seniūnija).

== Geography ==
The town is situated on the northeastern shore of Lake Vištytis, close to the Russian border (Kaliningrad Oblast).

The town has preserved its street structure and market square since the 18th century. Vištytis Regional Park is near the town. Southwest is Vištytis hill fort, and in a nearby village, Nebūtkiemis is a big Vištytis stone, preserved geological artifact.

== History ==
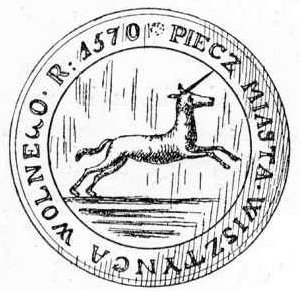
16th-century seal

Vištytis was established in the first half of the 16th century, on the border with the Duchy of Prussia. The first mention of the Višytis manor dates from 1538. Around it a settlement of Lithuanian, Polish and German inhabitants started to grow rapidly. On September 8, 1570, Sigismund II Augustus, in his capacity as Grand Duke of Lithuania, granted Vištytis town rights and coat of arms. It was a royal town of the Polish–Lithuanian Commonwealth. It was the first town in the region. In 1589, local starost Krzysztof Jeśman granted land to Jews to build a synagogue. In 1736, King Augustus III of Poland appointed Jesuits to the local Catholic church. The Jesuit mission house was closed in c. 1760, and ordinary parish priests were assigned to the church.

In 1776 Vištytis lost its town rights, although some administration remained in the town, as it is known from the records in 1785 and 1790. Town representatives participated in the Great Sejm and succeeded in regaining town rights, although it did not get a royal privilege. That caused conflict with local elders, and the case was taken to the court. The outcome of the court is not clear, but the town preserved some of autonomy in the 19th century.

Following the Third Partition of Poland, it was annexed by Prussia in 1795. In 1807, it became part of the short-lived Polish Duchy of Warsaw, and after its dissolution in 1815, it became part of newly established Russian-controlled Congress Poland. In the 19th century, a major industry in Vištytis was the manufacture of brushes. After the railroad line from Königsberg to Russia was constructed in 1861 through Kybartai, some kilometers to the north, the town declined rapidly. Beginning in the 1850s, a significant number of the town's Jews emigrated to Germany, the United States, and South Africa. As of 1890, 31% of the city's registered residents were in emigration in the US and Germany.

=== 20th century ===
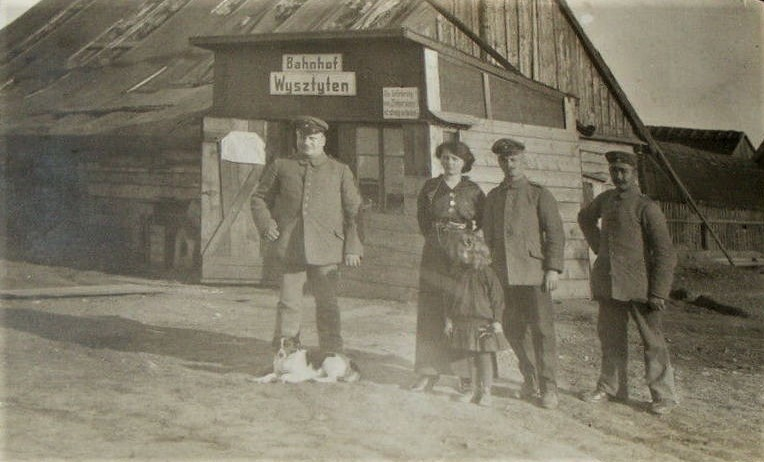
Railway station during German occupation in World War I

During World War I, in 1915, the town was devastated by Imperial Russian troops retreating after the Winter Battle of the Masurian Lakes, and afterwards it was occupied by Germany.

With the end of World War I, Poland and Lithuania regained independence as separate countries, and the town was disputed. Local Poles formed a Polish municipal committee headed by wójt Józef Kałwajć and gathered over 1,000 signatures on a petition to incorporate the town to Poland, wanting to belong administratively to Suwałki County, while local Lithuanians formed a Lithuanian municipal committee, recognizing the sovereignty of Vilkaviškis County within Lithuania. The rival Polish-Lithuanian dual authority lasted until May 1919, when a Lithuanian militia entered the town and forced the Polish committee to disband and recognize the local Lithuanian authorities. Local Poles continued passive resistance to Lithuanian authority.

After the 1939 Molotov–Ribbentrop Pact, the Lithuanian territory up to the border at Vištytis was occupied by Soviet forces. Immediately after the launch of Operation Barbarossa on 22 June 1941, the town was conquered by Wehrmacht forces. During the Holocaust, all of Vištytis' Jews were murdered, mainly by local collaborators in the town. The exact number murdered is unclear; estimates range from 200 - 400 Jews (out of the town's general population of around 1000). First the men were shot, then the women - but, to save bullets, the Jewish children were killed by having their heads bashed against the trees in the town park. A memorial to the victims was later erected by the Soviets near a windmill called Grist Mill, but the plaque made no mention that those buried in the nearby fields were Jews. Later, a 'Jewish' tombstone was erected that noted what happened.

Renewed city coat of arms was granted by the President of Lithuania on May 3, 1999.

== Notable people ==
- Algimantas Kezys - Lithuanian priest and photographer
- Bronius Leonavičius - Lithuanian artist
- Irena Ylienė - Lithuanian singer
- Juozas Kalvaitis - Lithuanian composer
- Jonas Bendorius - Lithuanian composer
- Jurgis Tiškevičius - Lithuanian auxiliary bishop of Vilnius (1627–1633), bishop of Samogitia (1633–1649), and bishop of Vilnius (1649–1656).
- Julian Gruner - born in Vištytis on 13 October 1898, medical doctor practicing in Kalisz, sportsman (three-time national champion in the high jump and javelin throw), officer of the Polish Army murdered at the age of 42 along with about 3900 other Polish POWs in the Soviet death camp in Kharkiv between April and May 1940, part of the Katyn massacre.
- Liudvikas Butkevičius - Lithuanian Army officer
