= Cathedral School of Vilnius =

Coordinates: 54°41′10″N 25°17′17″E

Information
- School type: Cathedral school
- Religious affiliation: Catholic Church
- Established: Late 14th Century
- Closed: Early 19th Century

The Cathedral School of Vilnius was a cathedral school attached to the Vilnius Cathedral. Possibly established in the late 14th century, it is believed to be the earliest school in the Grand Duchy of Lithuania. For about a hundred years it was the only Catholic school in Vilnius (possibly due to a royal privilege prohibiting establishment of other schools).

== Establishment ==
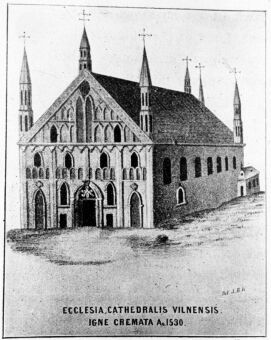
Gothic Vilnius Cathedral (1530)

The exact date of its establishment is unknown, but it must be sometime after the establishment of Vilnius Diocese in 1388. It is widely cited that the school was first mentioned in written sources on 9 May 1397 in a document by bishop Andrzej Jastrzębiec. This document was discovered and publicized by priest Jan Kurczewski in 1908. In 2023, historian Aivas Ragauskas published an article arguing that Kurczewski incorrectly translated the Latin word "stubella" (diminutive of "stuba") as a school when it means a small room or building.

Before Kurczewski's publication, authors cited a 23 April 1452 document by which King Casimir IV Jagiellon allotted 8 kopas of groschens from city's alcohol tax revenue to pay for the salary of the school's principal as the earliest known document referencing the school.

== History ==
It was initially a primary school, evolving into a secondary school by the first half of the 15th century. Most likely the school taught trivium and quadrivium and catered to the church needs by educating the lower clergy. Its first pupils were indigenous Christians that also knew the Lithuanian language.

In 1522, Bishop John expanded the school to three classes and introduced courses in rhetoric, dialectics, classical literature, arithmetic, music. The students studied Distichs of Cato and Ars grammatica by Aelius Donatus. In 1539, the school had twelve boys who sang in a church choir and twenty boys who served as altar boys.

During its existence, the school prepared over 100 students who later pursued academic careers at the Jagiellonian University in Kraków.

The cathedral school was assigned to Vilnius Academy (now Vilnius University), established by the Jesuits in 1570, as a lower level school. The cathedral school continued to function. It is known that its building burned down in 1610 and that the construction of a new two-story brick building began in 1632. The school closed in the first half of the 19th century.

== See also ==
- List of the oldest schools in the world
