= Christianization of Lithuania =

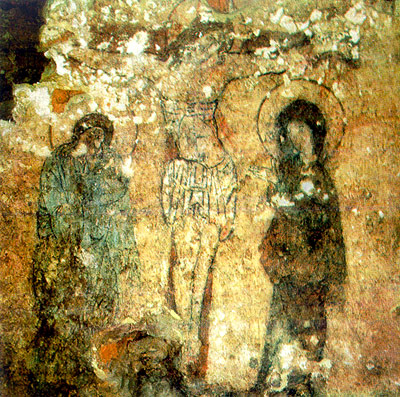
The fresco in the Vilnius Cathedral, dating to the Christianization of Lithuania (14th century)

The Christianization of Lithuania (Lithuanian: Lietuvos krikštas) occurred in the late 14th and early 15th centuries, initiated by the Lithuanian rulers Jogaila, King of Poland and Grand Duke of Lithuania, and his cousin Vytautas the Great. It signified the official adoption of Catholic Christianity by Lithuania, the last pagan state in Europe, which had consequently been subjected to crusades by the Teutonic Knights. However, Lithuania's first ruler to be baptised was Mindaugas in 1250s. This event ended one of the most complicated and lengthiest processes of Christianization in European history.

== History ==
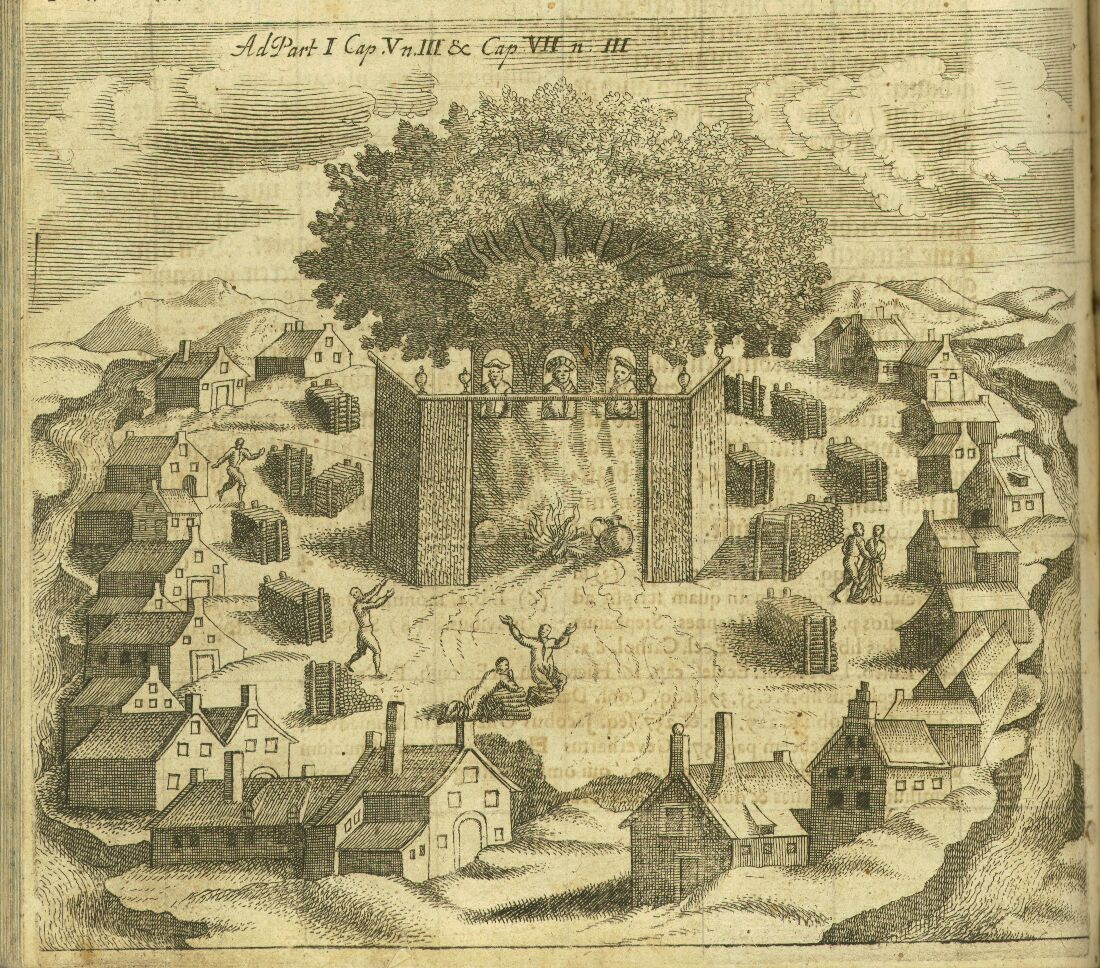
Romuva sanctuary in Prussia

=== Early contacts with Christianity ===
Lithuanians' contacts with the Christian religion predated the establishment of the Duchy of Lithuania in the 13th century. The first known record of the name Lithuania (Litua), recorded in the Annals of Quedlinburg in 1009, relates to the mission led by Bruno of Querfurt, who baptised several rulers of the Yotvingians, a nearby Baltic tribe. Nonetheless Bruno did not reach Lithuania proper.

Lithuanians had more active contacts with the Kievan Rus' and subsequent Eastern Slavic states, which had adopted Eastern Orthodox Christianity following the Christianization of Kievan Rus' in the 10th century. From the 12th century onwards, Orthodox missions reached Latgale and Nalšia, directed from Novgorod, Pskov, and Polotsk. By the end of that century, Catholic missionaries began arriving in the Baltic territories, with Saint Meinhard, the Bishop of Livonia, as a pioneer.

As the dukes of Lithuania extended their dominion eastwards, the influence of the Slavic states on their culture increased. Their subordinates and the people followed their example, borrowing, for instance, many of the East Slavic versions of Christian names in the 11th–12th centuries. This borrowing became increasingly widespread among the pagan population in Aukštaitija, though much less so in Samogitia. The influence of Orthodox Christianity on pagan Lithuanian culture is evidenced in about one-third of present-day Lithuanian surnames which are constructed from baptismal names are Old Church Slavonic in origin. In addition, the Lithuanian words for "church", "baptism", "Christmas" and "fast" are classed as loanwords from Russian rather than Polish.

=== Baptism of Mindaugas ===
The emergence of a monastic state of the Livonian Order around the Lithuanian borders made it rather urgent to choose a state religion. The first Lithuanian grand duke to adopt Western Christianity was Mindaugas, although his nephew and rival Tautvilas had done that earlier, in 1250. The first translations of Catholic prayers from German were made during his reign and have been known since.

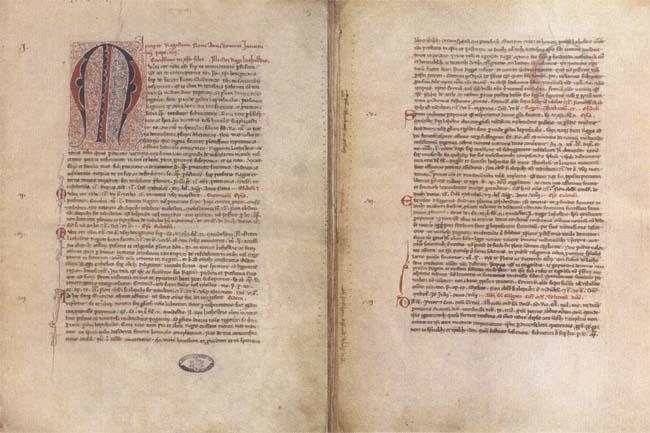
The Pope Innocent IV bull regarding Lithuania's placement under the jurisdiction of the Bishop of Rome, Mindaugas' baptism and coronation

In 1249, Tautvilas' ally Daniel of Galicia attacked Novogrudok, and in 1250, another ally of Tautvilas, the Livonian Order, organized a major raid against the land of Nalšia and Mindaugas' domains in Lithuania proper. Attacked from the south and north and facing the possibility of unrest elsewhere, Mindaugas was placed in an extremely difficult position, but managed to use the conflicts between the Livonian Order and the Archbishop of Riga in his own interests. In 1250 or 1251, Mindaugas agreed to receive baptism and relinquish control over some lands in western Lithuania, for which he was to receive a crown in return.

Mindaugas and his family were baptised in the Catholic rite in 1250 or 1251. On July 17, 1251, Pope Innocent IV issued a papal bull proclaiming Lithuania a kingdom and the state was placed under the jurisdiction of the Bishop of Rome. Mindaugas and his wife Morta were crowned at some time during the summer of 1253, and the Kingdom of Lithuania, formally a Christian state, was established. Even after nominally becoming a Catholic, King Mindaugas did not cease sacrificing to his own gods. Despite the ruling family's baptism, Lithuania had not become a truly Christian state, since there were no fruitful efforts to convert its population; Lithuanians and Samogitians stood firmly for their ancestral religion. Some of this might be attributed to the Golden Horde's tumanbashi (commander) Burundai's campaign in 1259 and 1260, which caused destruction in Lithuania proper and Nalšia.

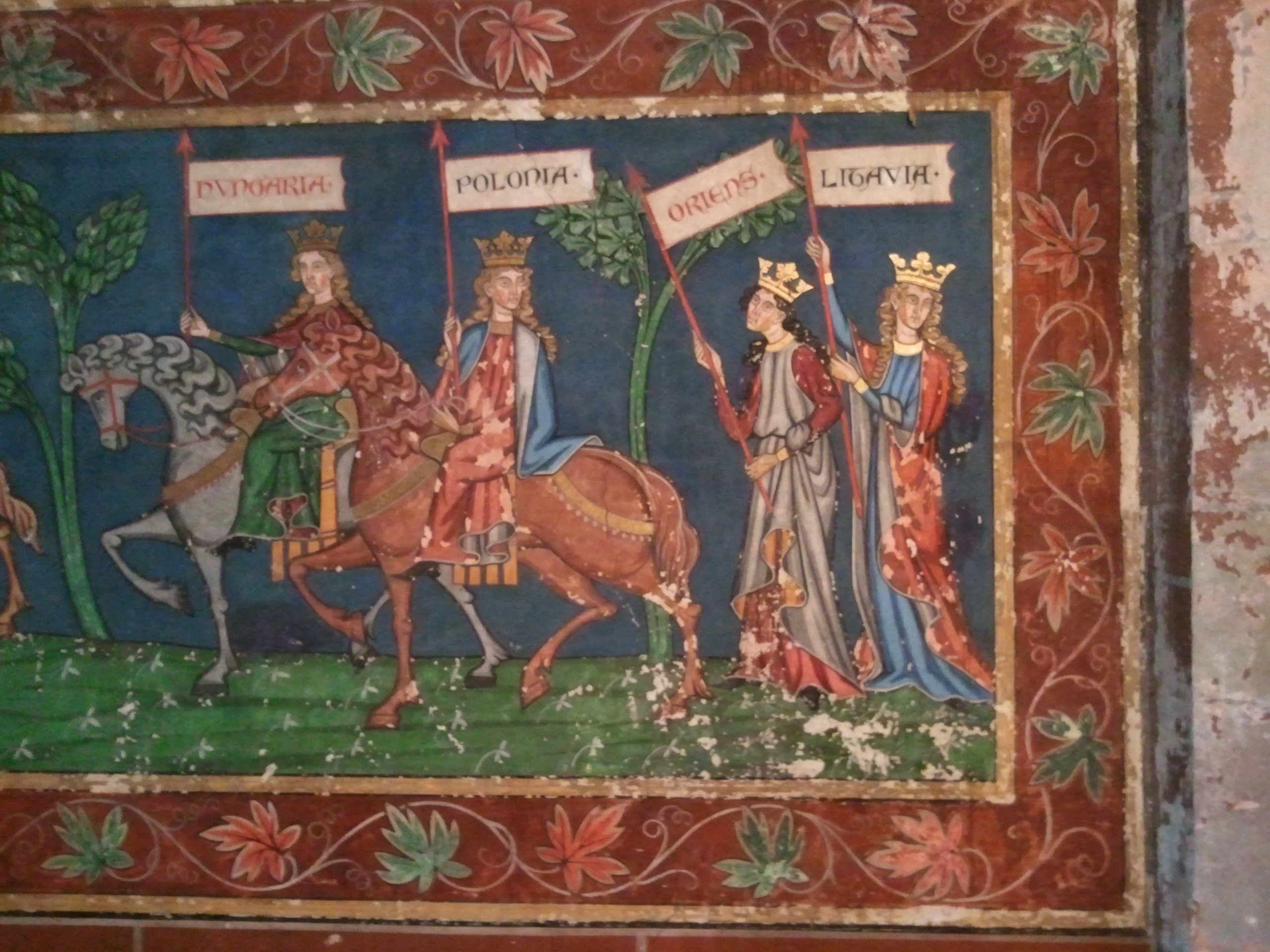
Medieval fresco from the Saint-Pierre-le-Jeune Church in Strasbourg, portraying 15 European nations' path towards Christianity. Lithuania presented as the last figure.

=== Vacillation between East and West ===
Mindaugas' successors did not express enough interest in following in his footsteps. There were decades of vacillation between the Latin and the Orthodox options. "For Gediminas and Algirdas, retention of paganism provided a useful diplomatic tool and weapon... that allowed them to use promises of conversion as a means of preserving their power and independence". Grand Duke Algirdas had pursued an option of "dynamic balance". Throughout his reign, he teased both Avignon and Constantinople with the prospects of a conversion; several unsuccessful attempts were made to negotiate the conversion of Lithuania.

To avoid further clashes with the Teutonic Order, in 1349, Lithuanian co-ruler Kęstutis started the negotiations with Pope Clement VI for the conversion and had been promised royal crowns for himself and his sons. Algirdas willingly remained aside of the business and dealt with the order in the Ruthenian part of the state. The intermediary in the negotiations, Polish King Casimir III, made an unexpected assault on Volhynia and Brest in October 1349 that ruined Kęstutis' plan. During the Polish-Lithuanian war for Volhynia, King Louis I of Hungary offered a peace agreement to Kęstutis on 15 August 1351, according to which Kęstutis obliged himself to accept Christianity and provide the Kingdom of Hungary with military aid, in exchange of the royal crown. Kęstutis confirmed the agreement by performing a pagan ritual (killing a bull by throwing a knife at it) to convince the other side. In fact, Kęstutis had no intentions to abide the agreement and ran away on his way to Buda.

By the 14th century, the Grand Duchy of Lithuania had emerged as a successor to Kievan Rus' in the western part of its dominions. Although its sovereign was pagan, the majority of the population was Slavic and Orthodox. To legitimize their rule in these areas, the Lithuanian royalty frequently married into the Orthodox Rurikid aristocracy of Eastern Europe. As a result, some Lithuanian rulers were baptised into Eastern Orthodoxy either as children (Švitrigaila) or adults. The first one was Vaišelga, son and heir of Mindaugas, who took monastic vows at an Orthodox monastery in Lavrashev, near Novgorodok, and later established a convent there.

=== Christianization by Jogaila and Vytautas ===
The final attempt to Christianize Lithuania was made by Jogaila, who had a Russian mother, Uliana of Tver. Grand Prince Dmitry Donskoy of Moscow proposed that Jogaila marry his daughter on the condition that he first convert to Orthodoxy and become a subject of Moscow. Jogaila therefore faced a choice between Russia and Orthodoxy on the one hand, and Poland and Catholicism on the other. As a result, the Poles intensified their diplomatic efforts to secure Jogaila's support. Faced with the threat posed from the Teutonic Order, Jogaila chose to accept a Polish proposal to convert to Catholicism and marry Jadwiga of Poland. On these and other terms, on 14 August 1385, at the castle of Krėva, Jogaila agreed to adopt Christianity, signing the Act of Krėva. This led to increased antagonism between Lithuania and Moscow, which sought to become the political center of the Russian lands, as well as the sole protector of Russian Orthodoxy against Latinism.

Jogaila was duly baptised at the Wawel Cathedral in Kraków on 15 February 1386 and became Władysław II Jagiełło, the King of Poland. The royal baptism was followed by the conversion of most of Jogaila's court and knights, as well as Jogaila's brothers Karigaila, Vygantas, Švitrigaila and cousin Vytautas. Jogaila sent Dobrogost, Bishop of Poznań, as ambassador to Pope Urban VI with a petition for the erection of an episcopal see at Vilnius and the appointment of Andrzej Jastrzębiec to fill it.

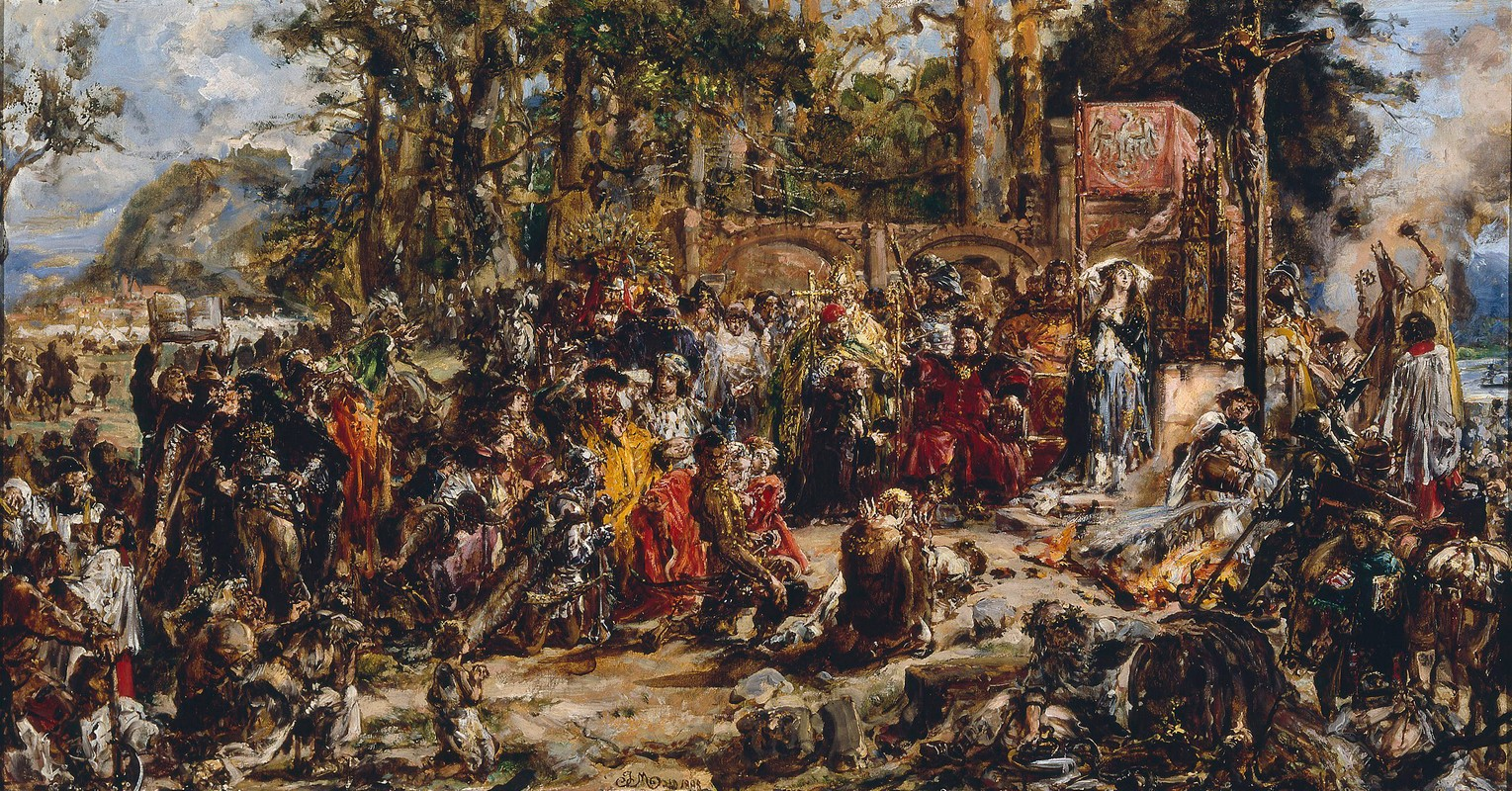
The Baptism of Lithuania by Jan Matejko (1888)

Jogaila returned to Lithuania in February 1387. The baptism of nobles and their peasants was at first carried out in the capital Vilnius and its environs. The nobility and some peasants in Aukštaitija were baptized in spring, followed by the rest of the Lithuanian nobility. The parishes were established in ethnic Lithuania and the new Vilnius Cathedral was built in 1387 on the site of a demolished pagan temple. According to the information of disputed accuracy provided by Jan Długosz, the first parochial churches were built in Lithuanian pagan towns Vilkmergė, Maišiagala, Lida, Nemenčinė, Medininkai, Kreva, Haina and Abolcy, all belonging to the Jogaila's patrimony. Jogaila destroyed the old places of worship: altars, sacred groves, killed grass snakes and other snakes that were regarded as divine guardians of households at the time. The papal bull issued by Pope Urban VI on 12 March 1388 has information about destruction of pagan cult objects in Vilnius and provided legal grounds for establishment of the Vilnius Cathedral. On 19 April 1389, Pope Urban VI recognized the status of Lithuania as a Roman Catholic state. Lithuania was the last state in Europe to be Christianized.

Samogitia was the last ethnic region of Lithuania to become Christianized in 1413, following the defeat of the Teutonic Order in the Battle of Grunwald and the Peace of Thorn and its subsequent return to the Lithuanian control. In November 1413, Vytautas himself sailed Neman River and Dubysa, reached the environs of Betygala, where he baptised the first groups of Samogitians. In 1416, the construction of eight first parochial churches was started. The Diocese of Samogitia was established on 23 October 1417 and Matthias of Trakai became the first Bishop of Samogitia. The cathedral was built in Medininkai around 1464.

== Aftermath ==
Ethnic Lithuanian nobles were the main converts to Catholicism, but paganism remained strong among the peasantry. Pagan customs prevailed for a long time among the common people of Lithuania and were covertly practiced. There had been no persecution of priests and adherents of the old faith. However, by the 17th century, following the Counter-Reformation (1545–1648), Roman Catholicism had essentially taken precedence over earlier pagan beliefs.

The conversion and its political implications had lasting repercussions for the history of Lithuania. As the majority of the population of the Grand Duchy of Lithuania outside Lithuania proper was Orthodox and the elite gradually converted to Roman Catholicism, religious tensions increased. Some of the Orthodox Gediminids left Lithuania for Muscovy, where they gave rise to such families as the Galitzine and the Troubetzkoy. The Orthodox population of present-day Ukraine and eastern Belarus often sympathized with the rulers of Muscovy, who portrayed themselves as the champions of Orthodoxy. These feelings contributed to such reverses as the Battle of Vedrosha, which crippled the Grand Duchy and undermined its position as a dominant power in Eastern Europe.

On the other hand, the conversion to Roman Catholicism facilitated Lithuania's integration into the cultural sphere of Central Europe and paved the way to the political alliance of Lithuania and Poland, finalized as the Union of Lublin in 1569.

== See also ==
- Northern Crusades
- History of Lithuania

== Sources ==
- Mažeika, Rasa (5 July 2017) [2001]. "When Crusader and Pagan Agree: Conversion as a Point of Honour in the Baptism of King Mindaugas of Lithuania (c. 1240–63)". Crusade and Conversion on the Baltic Frontier 1150–1500. Routledge. pp. 197–214. ISBN 978-0-7546-0325-2.
