= Bishop of Smolensk (Latin Catholic) =

Bishops of Smolensk were the Latin Catholic bishops of Smolensk diocese, formed in 1611 after the occupation of the Russian city of Smolensk (1611-1654), mostly liquidated in 1667 when the Diocese had only three parishes, finally liquidated in 1809 (territory united to the Archdiocese of Mohilev since 1772-1783).

== Diocesan bishops ==
- Piotr Parczewski 1636–1649
- Franciszek Dołmat Isajkowski 1650–1654
- Hieronim Władysław Sanguszko 1655–1657
- Jerzy Białłozor 1658–1661
- Kazimierz Pac 1664–1667
- Gothard Jan Tyzenhaus 1668–1669
- Aleksander Kotowicz 1673–1685
- Konstanty Kazimierz Brzostowski 1685–1687
- Eustachy Kotowicz 1688–1704
- Jan Mikołaj Zgierski 1706–1710
- Aleksander Mikołaj Horain 1711–1716
- Ludwik Karol Ogiński 1717–1718
- Karol Piotr Pancerzyński 1721–1724
- Bogusław Korwin Gosiewski 1725–1744
- Jerzy Mikołaj Hylzen 1745–1763
- Gabriel Wodzyński 1772–1788
- Adam Stanisław Naruszewicz 1788–1790
- Tymoteusz Paweł Gorzeński 1790–1809

== Suffragan bishops ==
- Gabriel Wodzyński 1759–1772
- Adam Stanisław Naruszewicz 1775–1788
