= Jerzy Tyszkiewicz =

Lithuanian auxiliary bishop

- Bishop of Vilnius
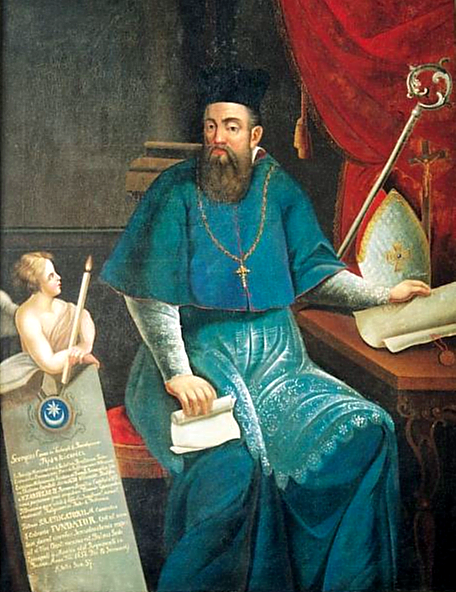
- Coat of arms: Leliwa
- Born: 1596; Vištytis, Grand Duchy of Lithuania, Polish–Lithuanian Commonwealth
- Died: 17 January 1656 (aged 59–60); Domnau, Duchy of Prussia (now Domnovo, Russia)
- Noble family: Tyszkiewicz family
- Father: Jan Ostafi Tyszkiewicz Łohojski
- Mother: Zofia Wiśniowiecka

Jerzy Tyszkiewicz (Lithuanian: Jurgis Tiškevičius; 1596–1656) was Lithuanian nobleman and clergyman who served as auxiliary bishop of Vilnius from 1627 to 1633, bishop of Samogitia from 1633 to 1649, and bishop of Vilnius from 1649 to 1656.

== Biography ==
He was born in Vištytis to the prominent Lithuanian noble Tyszkiewicz family.

Educated in Jesuit academies, he took the Holy Orders in 1622. He served as the canon in Kraków and later, Vilnius. In 1637, he founded a monastery in what would become the town of Žemaičių Kalvarija. Using his personal wealth, he built churches in Surviliškis, Kuliai, Laukžemė, Pušalotas and in other Lithuanian places. He authored several Lithuanian language prayers and hymns.

He was seen as an active administrator, politician and diplomat.

In his role as an envoy of Ladislaus Vasa, King of Poland and Grand Duke of Lithuania, he paid a formal visit to Pope Urban VIII in 1638, thereby assuming the role of lead negotiator for the Catholic delegation of the Grand Duchy of Lithuania in negotiations with the Protestants, in Toruń in 1645. In 1655, along with other members of the nobility of the Grand Duchy of Lithuania, he requested military assistance from King Charles X Gustav of Sweden against the Russian army (during the war between the Polish-Lithuanian Commonwealth and Russia in 1654–67). In 1655, he participated in the drafting of the initial version of the Treaty of Kėdainiai. Following the occupation of Vilnius by the Russian army in 1655, he sought refuge in Prussia and died there in 1656.

== Bibliography ==
- Nitecki P., Biskupi Kościoła w Polsce: w latach 965-1999. Słownik biograficzny, wyd. 2, Warszawa 2000, ISBN 83-211-1311-7, pp. 458-459.
- Wileński słownik biograficzny, Bydgoszcz 2002, ISBN 83-87865-28-1, p. 412.

Catholic Church titles
Preceded by Merkelis Geišas (Melchior Gieysz)	Bishop of Samogitia; 1633–1649	Succeeded by Piotr Parczewski
Preceded by Abraham Woyna	Bishop of Vilnius; 1649–1656	Succeeded by Jan Karol Dowgiałło Zawisza
