= Jonas Jaknavičius =

Lithuanian lexicographer (1589–1668)

- Born: 1589; Eastern part of Lithuania proper
- Died: April 11, 1668; Vilnius, Grand Duchy of Lithuania
- Occupations: Lithuanian chancellery worker, teacher, academician, Jesuit
- Notable work: Ewangelie polskie y litewskie

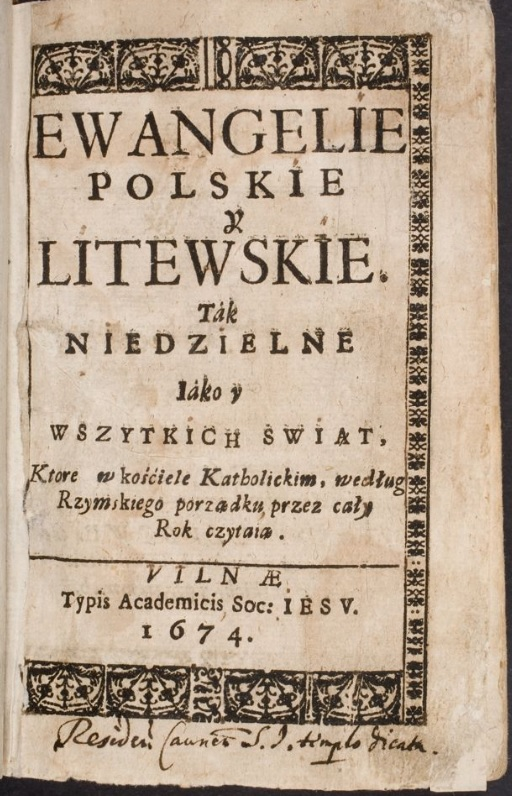
Ewangelie polskie y litewskie, 1674 edition

Jonas Jaknavičius (1589 – April 11, 1668) was a Lithuanian Jesuit chancellery worker, teacher, Rector of the Kražiai College, Smolensk College, and Vilnius College.

Jaknavičius prepared and published a book about the Polish and Lithuanian gospels for sermons (Polish: Ewangelie polskie y litewskie, Lithuanian: Lenkiškos ir lietuviškos evangelijos) which was republished 40 times in the 17th-19th centuries due to their popularity. The Ewangelie polskie y litewskie was written and published in Polish and Lithuanian languages. The oldest surviving version of the Ewangelie polskie y litewskie is from 1647 and was recognized by UNESCO (currently preserved at the Kaunas University of Technology).

Jaknavičius also contributed to the 2nd edition (1631) of Konstantinas Sirvydas' dictionary Dictionarium Trium Lingvarum in usum Studiosæ Iuventutis.
