= Jonas I Losovičius =

Lithuanian Catholic clergyman (died 1481)

- Bishop of Vilnius; Bishop of Lutsk
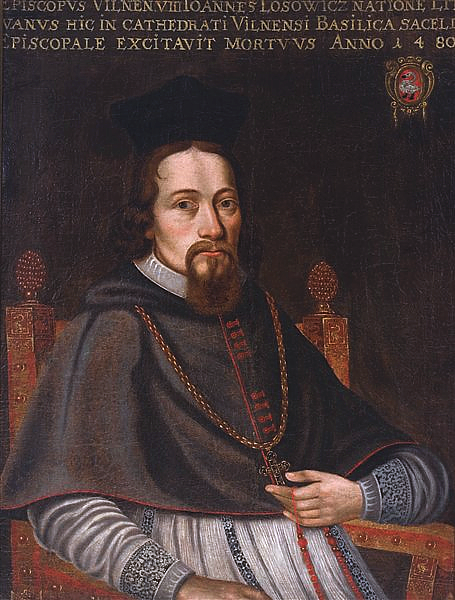
- Portrait painted in the 17th century
- Church: Roman Catholic Church
- See: Roman Catholic Diocese of Vilnius, Roman Catholic Diocese of Lutsk
- Appointed: 1463 (Lutsk), 1468 (Vilnius)
- Installed: 1463 (Lutsk), 1468 (Vilnius)
- Term ended: 1468 (Lutsk), 1481 (Vilnius)
- Predecessor: Nicholas of Šalčininkai

Orders
- Rank: Bishop

Personal details
- Born: Vilnius, Grand Duchy of Lithuania
- Died: between February and August 1481 Vilnius, Grand Duchy of Lithuania
- Education: Collegium Maius of Kraków (possibly)

Jonas I Losovičius (Latin: Joannes Losowicz; died between February and August 1481) was a Lithuanian Roman Catholic clergyman. Losovičius since 1463 served as the Bishop of Lutsk and later since 1468 as the seventh Bishop of Vilnius until his death.

== Biography ==
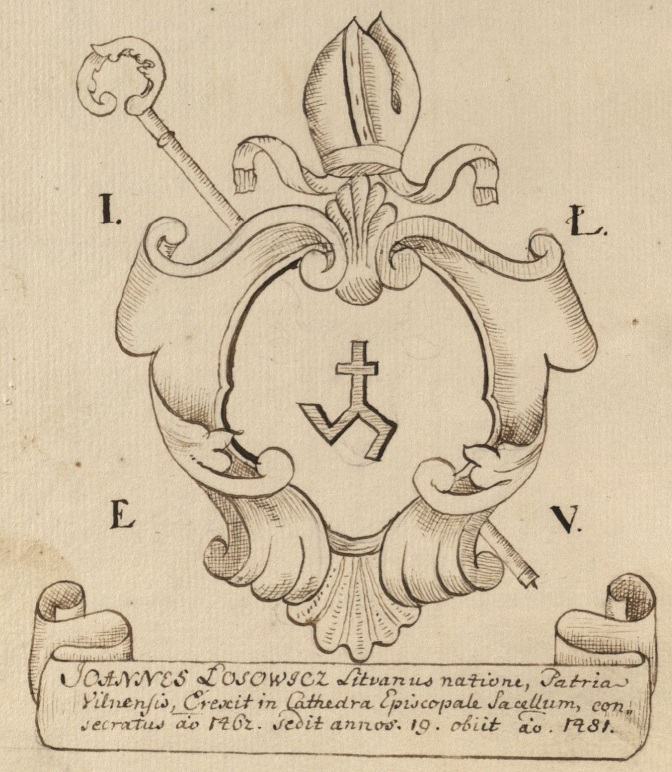
Coat of arms of Losovičius

Losovičius parents were Vilnian townspeople of bourgeoisie class. Losovičius was Lithuanian. According to the Vilnius University professor Piotr Wijuk Kojałowicz, Losovičius was Lithuanian by nationality (Latin: Litvanus natione). He used his own coat of arms Rozmiar. Losovičius possibly studied at Collegium Maius of Kraków.

Before January 1463 Losovičius served as Canon of Vilnius.

On 12 January 1463 or 24 January 1463 Losovičius was appointed as the Bishop of Lutsk and served in this position until 4 May 1468. In 1465, the Tatars devastated the city of Lutsk. Consequently, Losovičius in 1465 moved the residence of the Bishop of Lutsk to Janów Podlaski, which belonged to the Grand Duchy of Lithuania since the early 14th century and its first church was funded by the Lithuanian Grand Duke Vytautas the Great in 1428. Moreover, the same year in 1465 Losovičius obtained the Kulm rights to Janów Podlaski and renamed it after his name to Janów Biskupi. This relocation of the main residence of the bishops of Lutsk to Janów remained for more than three centuries until 1796.

On 4 May 1468 Losovičius was appointed as the Bishop of Vilnius, the capital city of the Grand Duchy of Lithuania. According to Kojałowicz, Losovičius built the Bishops Chapel at Vilnius Cathedral. Moreover, Losovičius expanded the church network in the Grand Duchy of Lithuania, consecrated many newly founded parishes and newly built churches. Losovičius also participated in political affairs and communicated with Masters of Livonia.

Losovičius was a supporter of the Franciscans and a diligent assistant of Casimir IV Jagiellon, Grand Duke of Lithuania and King of Poland.
