= Jan Latalski =

Medieval Bishop

His Excellency Jan Latalski
- Archbishop of Gniezno; Primate of Poland
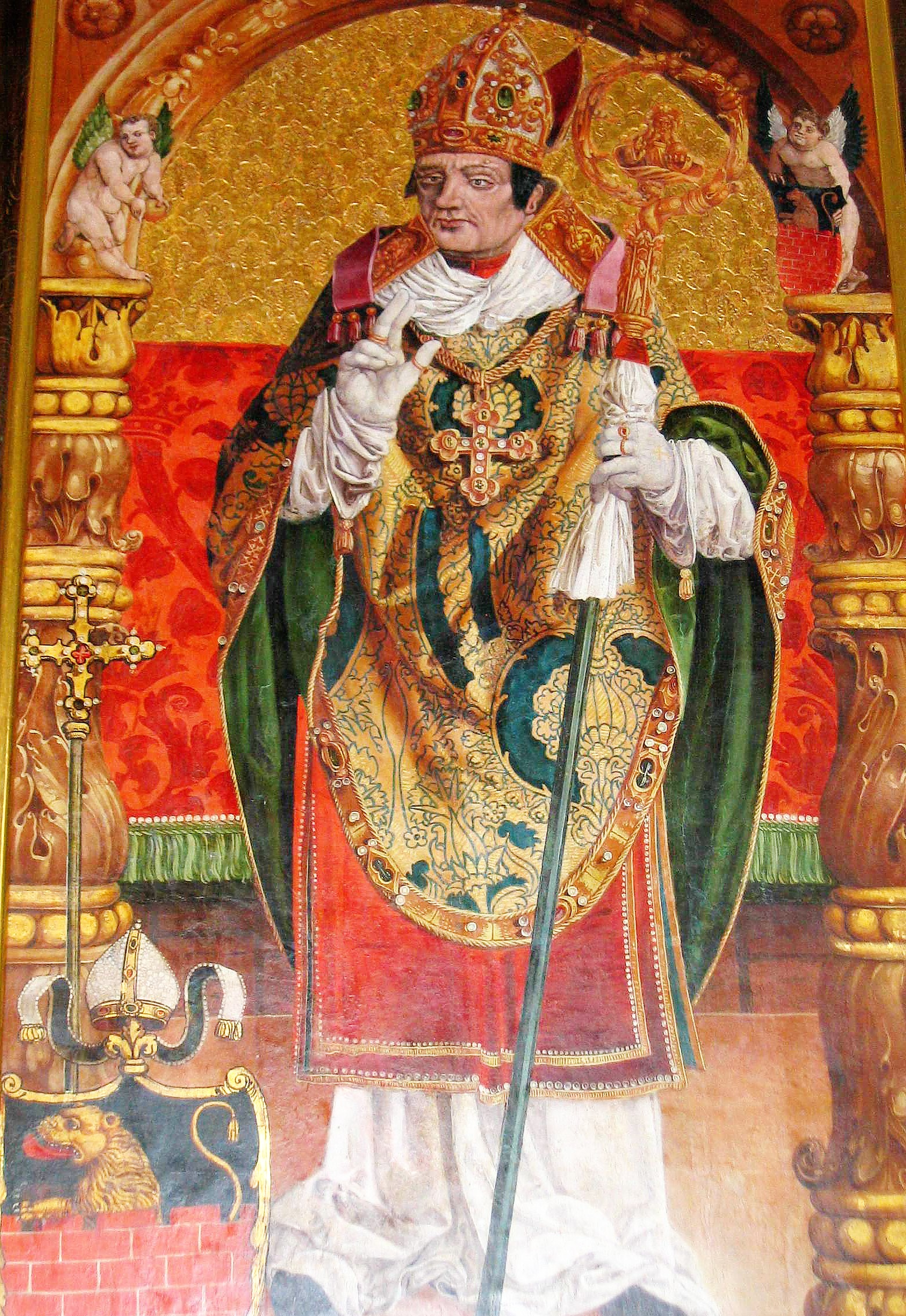
- Church: Roman Catholic
- Archdiocese: Gniezno
- Installed: 1537
- Term ended: 1540

Orders
- Consecration: 1536

Personal details
- Born: 1463
- Died: 29 August 1540 (aged 76–77) Skierniewice
- Coat of arms

Jan Latalski (1463–1540) was a medieval Bishop of Kraków, Poznań, Archbishop of Gniezno, and Primate of Poland.

Born in 1463 into the Prawdzic Polish noble family, he studied at the Cracow Academy. He was a pastor of Saint Peter and Paul church in Kostrzyn nad Odrą. From 1498 to 1505 he was a Chancellor for Elizabeth Rakuszanki, and Royal Secretary from 1504.

As Envoy of King Sigismund I the Old, he negotiated with the Teutonic Knights in Toruń in 1511, and in 1517 he led negotiations with the hospodarem.

In 1525 he was made the Bishop of Poznań with the support of Queen Bona and in 1536 was elected Bishop of Kraków. In 1537 he was made Archbishop of Gniezno and Primate of Poland. Although a favorite of the King, he was known to be fond of the drink.

He died in 1540 and was buried in the Cathedral of Gniezno.

Religious titles
Preceded by Piotr Tomicki	Bishop of Poznan; 1525-1538	Succeeded by John of the Lithuanian Dukes
Preceded by Andrzej Krzycki	Archbishop of Gniezno; 1537-1540	Succeeded by Piotr Gamrat
