= Aleksander Kazimierz Sapieha =

Polish nobleman (1624–1671)

Alaksandar Kazimier Sapieha
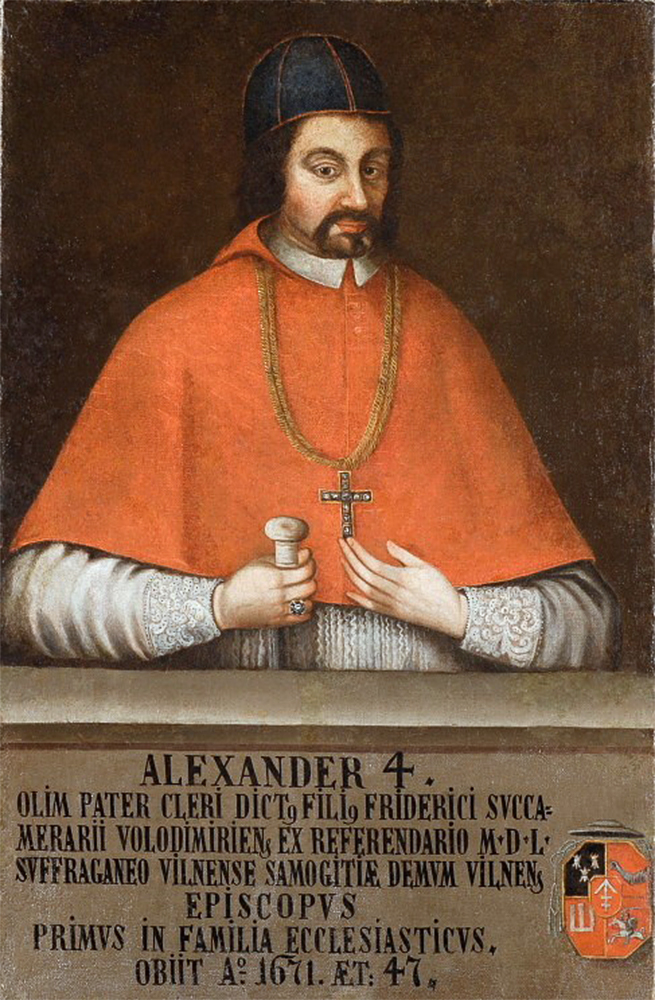
- Coat of arms: Lis
- Born: 13 May 1624; Maciejów
- Died: 22 May 1671 (aged 47); Vilnius
- Noble family: Sapieha
- Father: Fryderyk Sapieha

Aleksander Kazimierz Sapieha (13 May 1624 – 22 May 1671) was a Polish nobleman. He became bishop of Samogitia in 1660 and of Vilnius in 1667.

After the abdication of Jan Kazimierz, he initially supported the candidacy of Philip William, Elector Palatine, the son-in-law of Sigismund III Vasa, but later supported the successful election of Michał Korybut Wiśniowiecki.

== Bibliography ==
- Urzędnicy centralni i dygnitarze Wielkiego Księstwa Litewskiego XIV-XVIII wieku. Spisy. Ed. Henryk Lulewicz and Andrzej Rachuba. Kórnik 1994, p. 237.

Catholic Church titles
Preceded by Piotr Parczewski	Bishop of Samogitia; 1660–1667	Succeeded by Kazimierz Pac
Preceded by Jerzy Białłozor	Bishop of Wilno; 1667–1671	Succeeded by Mikołaj Stefan Pac
