= Nicholas of Šalčininkai =

- Bishop of Vilnius
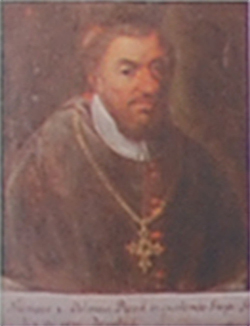
- Painting of Nicholas, 18th century
- Church: Roman Catholic Church
- See: Roman Catholic Diocese of Vilnius
- Appointed: 1453
- Installed: 1453
- Term ended: 1467
- Predecessor: Matthias of Trakai
- Successor: Jonas I Losovičius

Orders
- Rank: Bishop

Personal details
- Born: ~1420 Šalčininkai, Grand Duchy of Lithuania
- Died: September 29, 1467 (aged 46–47) Vilnius, Grand Duchy of Lithuania
- Education: Master's degree (1447)
- Alma mater: Collegium Maius of Kraków

Nicholas of Šalčininkai (Lithuanian: Mikalojus Dziežgovskis, Mikalojus II iš Šalčininkų; Polish: Mikołaj Dzierżkowicz z Sołecznik; 1420 – September 29, 1467) was a Roman Catholic clergyman and diplomat, who served as Bishop of Vilnius in years 1453–1467.

Nicholas gained his tertiary education at the Collegium Maius of Kraków (1442–1447). From 1453 until his death he served as the sixth Bishop of Vilnius, the capital city of the Grand Duchy of Lithuania.

== Biography ==
Nicholas was born in Šalčininkai, Grand Duchy of Lithuania, and he knew Lithuanian language. The earliest Cathalogus episcoporum Vilnensium doesn't give any information about his origins. In his 15th-century chronicle, Jan Długosz writes that Nicholas was a Pole of the Wieniawa coat of arms on his father side. A contemporary to Długosz, The Calendar of the Cracow Cathedral describes him as “dominus Nicolaus Polonus, nobilis de domo Wyeniawa” (lit. 'lord Nicholas the Pole, nobleman of the Wieniawa clan'). The 17th-century catalogs of Vilnius bishops (Katalog Słuszki, Nomina and Series episcoporum Vilnensium by Albert Wijuk Kojałowicz) unanimously describe him as “Lithuanian.”

Since 1442 Nicholas studied at the Collegium Maius of Kraków, which he graduated with a Master's degree in 1447. Upon graduation Nicholas served in Kraków's and Vilnius' churches. In 1451 he became royal secretary to Casimir IV and sent on his behalf to the senators of Lesser Poland.

In 1453 he was appointed as the sixth Bishop of Vilnius. Initially, Casimir IV Jagiellon, the King of Poland and Grand Duke of Lithuania, following the death of Matthias of Trakai had offered the position of the bishop of Vilnius to Sandivogius of Czechel, however he refused because he had no knowledge of the Lithuanian language (Latin: Generose mi Rex, Lithwanicum ydioma ignoro). Nicholas' efforts resulted in expansion of the network of churches in the Roman Catholic Diocese of Vilnius.

Nicholas was known as a co-worker and supporter of the policies of Casimir IV Jagiellon. Moreover, Nicholas assisted the Lithuanian nobles to negotiate with the State of the Teutonic Order, Livonian Order and their respective bishops during the Thirteen Years' War (1454–1466), which was started by the Poles because the Prussian Confederation on 18 February 1454 had requested Casimir IV Jagiellon to join Prussia as an autonomous subject of the Crown of the Kingdom of Poland and this request was accepted by Poland.

Nicholas died on September 29, 1467 due to a long-term illness which caused him paralysis.

== Bibliography ==
- Fijałek, Jan (1914). Uchrześcijanienie Litwy przez Polskę (in Polish). Kraków. p. 165.
