= The Baptism of Lithuania =

1888 painting by Jan Matejko

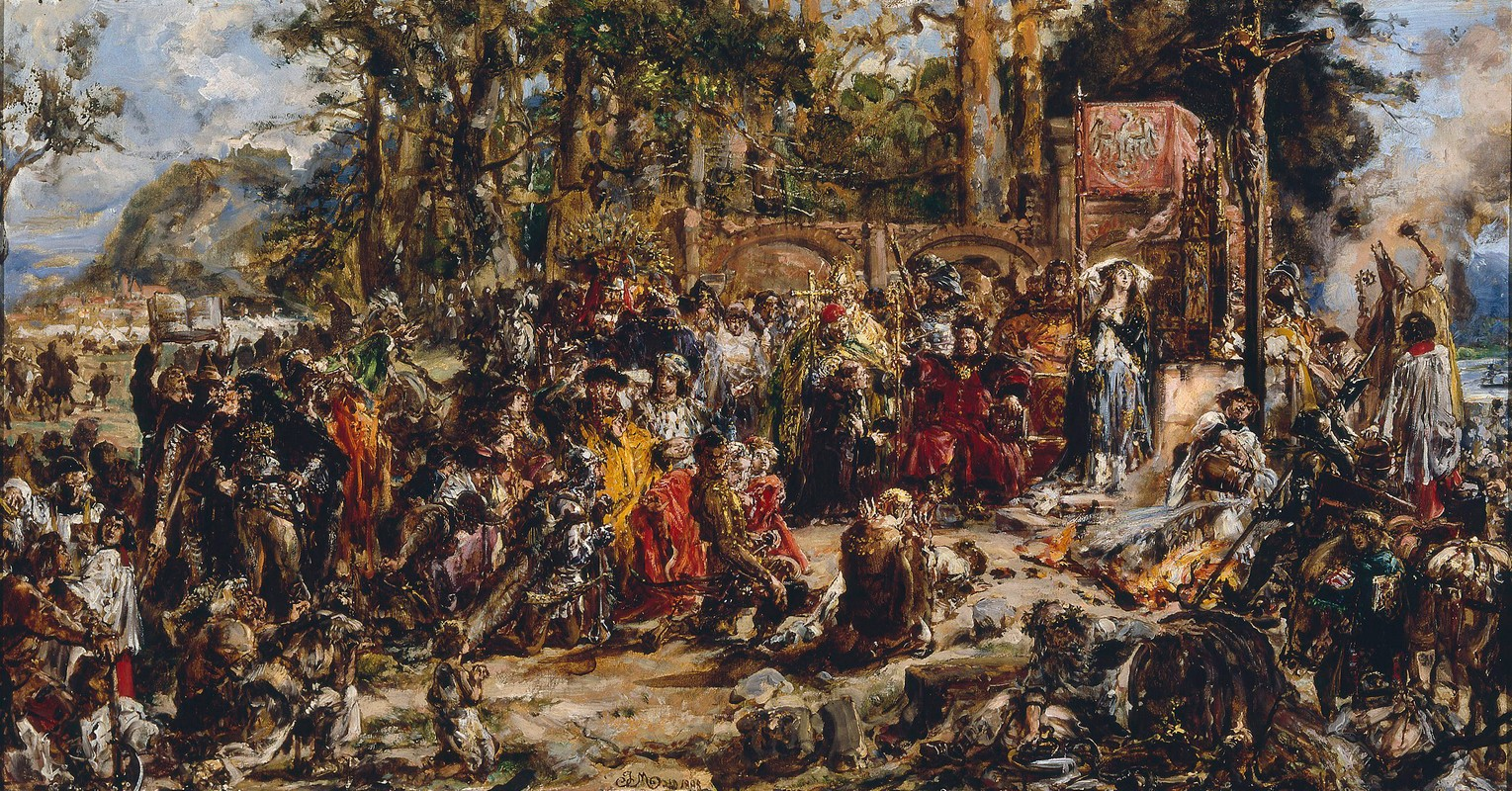
The Baptism of Lithuania (1888) by Jan Matejko

The Baptism of Lithuania is an oil on canvas painting by the Polish artist Jan Matejko, completed in 1888. It shows the conversion of the Grand Duchy of Lithuania to Christianity and the baptism of the boyar princes and people before the temple of the pagan god Perkūnas on Holy Saturday, 1387. It forms part of the artist's series The History of Civilisation in Poland.
