= Jakub Plichta =

Polish Catholic priest

- Bishop of Vilnius
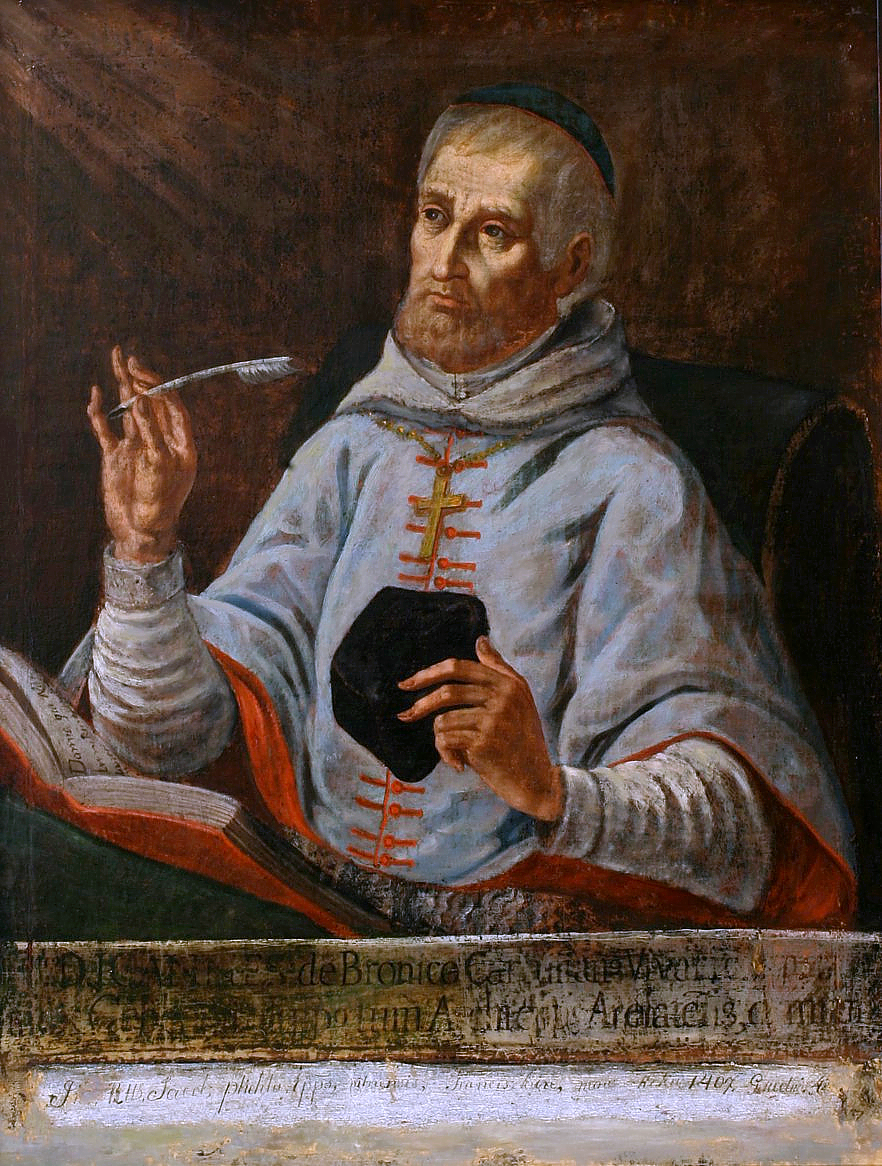
- See: Roman Catholic Diocese of Vilnius
- Appointed: 5 May 1399
- Installed: 5 May 1399
- Term ended: 7 February 1407
- Predecessor: Andrzej Jastrzębiec
- Successor: Mikołaj Gorzkowski

Orders
- Rank: Bishop

Personal details
- Born: Unknown
- Died: 7 February 1407 Vilnius, Grand Duchy of Lithuania
- Education: Kraków Franciscan Monastery
- Coat of arms: Półkozic

Jakub Plichta (Lithuanian: Jokūbas Plichta; died 7 February 1407) was a Lithuanian Roman Catholic clergyman who since 5 May 1399 served as the second Bishop of Vilnius until his death.

== Biography ==
Plichta was of Lithuanian origin, and belonged to the Franciscans. Plichta undoubtedly knew the Lithuanian language and local conditions (he was described as "of the same nation and language"), which was important for his selection as the Bishop of Vilnius by the Vilnius Cathedral Chapter with the support of Władysław II Jagiełło, Supreme Duke of Lithuania and King of Poland.

Catholic Church titles
Preceded by Andrzej Jastrzębiec	Bishop of Vilnius; 1398–1407	Succeeded by Mikołaj Gorzkowski
