= John of the Lithuanian Dukes =

Bishop of Vilnius and Poznań

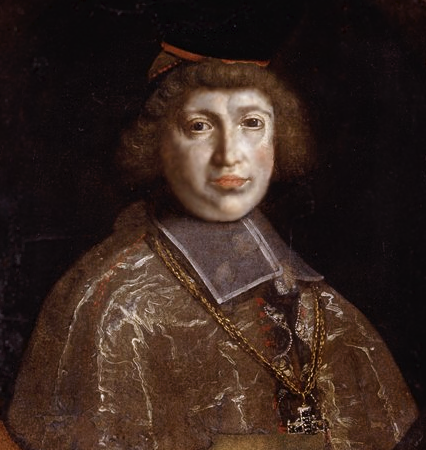
Portrait of John (unknown 17th-century artist)

John of the Lithuanian Dukes (Jan Ochstat de Thelnicz, Lithuanian: Jonas iš Lietuvos kunigaikščių, Polish: Jan z Książąt Litewskich; 8 January 1499 – 18 March 1538) was Bishop of Vilnius (1519–36) and of Bishop of Poznań (1536–38). He was the bishop when Protestantism was making the first inroads into the Grand Duchy of Lithuania and took the first steps in combating it. John was an illegitimate son of Sigismund I the Old, King of Poland and Grand Duke of Lithuania, and his mistress Katarzyna Telniczanka.

== Early life ==
John was born in 1499, well before Sigismund's first marriage to Barbara Zápolya in 1512. In July 1510, John's father received papal dispensation to remove defectus natalium, recognize him as a legitimate son, and ennoble him. John was granted the title "of the Lithuanian Dukes" around 1514 and used a version of the Lithuanian coat of arms. John became canon in Kraków in 1510 and in Poznań in 1516. John was a student at Kraków Academy and University of Bologna. In 1519, at the age of 21, John was nominated Bishop of Vilnius by his father. Long-term canon of Vilnius John Filipowicz was nominated to become Bishop of Kiev. Pope Leo X confirmed the nomination even though John was not yet ordained as priest (it happened only in 1531) and the Third Council of the Lateran required bishops to be at least 30 years of age. John was accompanied by his mother, who interfered in diocesan affairs. John and his mother faced a lot of opposition in Vilnius; he was even physically attacked and injured by Stanisław, son of Grand Chancellor Mikołaj II Radziwiłł. That prompted the pope to place John under the tutelage of Bishops of Kraków and Lutsk.

== Bishop of Vilnius ==
Despite the difficulties, John issued a new statute of Vilnius cathedral chapter in 1520, called the first known diocesan synod in 1520 or 1521, and, with pope's permission, created two new prelates of the cathedral chapter (in charge of scholastics and choir) in 1522. John also received papal legate Zacharias Ferrerius sent to investigate canonization of Saint Casimir after a miracle attributed to him during the Siege of Polotsk (1518). John paid attention to education. In 1522, he revised the curriculum of the Cathedral School of Vilnius to include rhetoric, dialectics, classical literature, arithmetic, music. In 1526 or 1527, John called the second diocesan synod which debated three major topics: improper behavior by priests, proper procedures of church services, and establishment of schools. The results of the proceedings were published in Kraków in 1528. The synod decided that each parish church should have a school that would instruct children in both Polish and Lithuanian languages. The synod also forbade hiring German teachers or traveling priests as they could be influenced by Lutheranism.

His father Sigismund I the Old gifted John with Šiauliai in 1524, Zhytomyr in 1525, and Kremenets in 1529. That was enough to make him a very wealthy magnate – the military census of 1528 placed him the ninth wealthiest. He funded repairs and reconstruction of Vilnius Cathedral and its belfry (architect Adam Annus). In June 1530, a large fire devastated Vilnius Cathedral. The repairs were slow and Italian architects Bernardino de Gianotis and Giovanni Cini were hired only in July 1534. John sponsored construction of a new church in Šiauliai in 1526. He established new parishes and built churches in Joniškis (named so after himself), Gervyaty, and Zarasai. In total, during his tenure as Bishop of Vilnius, more than 30 new churches were built in the diocese.

On 18 October 1529, John crowned his half-brother Sigismund II Augustus as Grand Duke of Lithuania.

In June 1535, John was appointed overseer of Vilnius Mint when it temporarily reopened during the Muscovite–Lithuanian War. In March 1536, Queen Bona Sforza, who disliked John, managed to get John removed from Vilnius to the Diocese of Poznań. He died there just two years later but, according to his last will, he was buried in Vilnius Cathedral. A new chapel, known as the Chapel of Bishops or Chapel of the Holy Sacrament, was built according to his last will around 1548. His tomb monument of Pińczów limestone was ordered by his brother Sigismund Augustus in 1556. It was designed by Giovanni Maria Mosca also known as Padovano, but did not survive.

Religious titles
Preceded by Albert Radziwiłł	Bishop of Vilnius; 1519–1536	Succeeded by Paweł Holszański
Preceded by Jan Latalski	Bishop of Poznań; 1536–1538	Succeeded by Stanisław Oleśnicki
