= Dawid Pilchowski =

Auxiliary Bishop of Vilnius (1735–1803)

Dawid Zygmunt Pilchowski
- Auxiliary Bishop of Vilnius
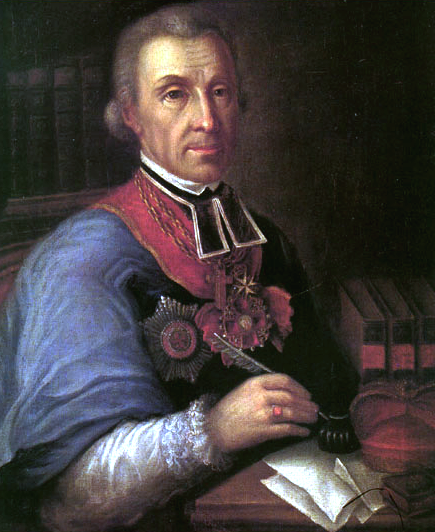

Personal details
- Born: 1735
- Died: 1803

Dawid Zygmunt Pilchowski (1735–1803) was a Polish clergyman, translator, and educator. He was auxiliary bishop of Vilnius from 1793 to 1803.

Pilchowski was born in 1735 in a village near Augustów. He received an education with the Jesuits and then taught at the Jesuit College in Vilnius. After the Jesuits were suppressed by the papal brief titled Dominus ac Redemptor, Pilchowski worked in printing and for the National Education Commission. He was auxiliary bishop in 1793 until his death in 1803 in Vilnius. As bishop, he also played a role in hospital administration.

According to Leon Rogalski, Pilchowski left his entire estate to schools.

== See also ==
- Roman Catholic Archdiocese of Vilnius
