= Matthias of Trakai =

Lithuanian Roman Catholic clergyman

- Bishop of Samogitia; Bishop of Vilnius; Bishop of Lutsk
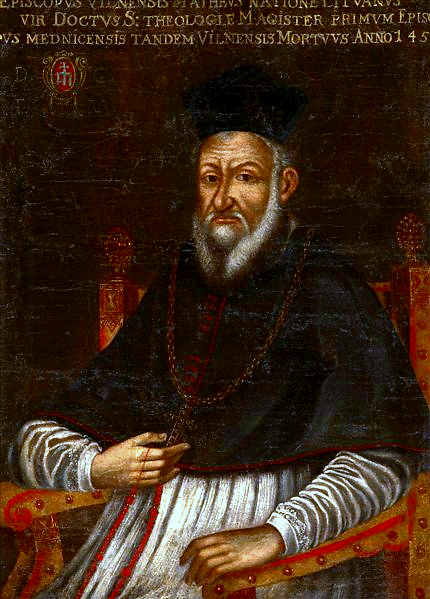
- Matthias, 17th century portrait
- Church: Roman Catholic Church
- See: Roman Catholic Diocese of Samogitia, Roman Catholic Diocese of Vilnius, Roman Catholic Diocese of Lutsk
- Appointed: 1417 (Samogitia), 1422 (Vilnius), 1453 (Lutsk)
- Installed: 1417 (Samogitia), 1422 (Vilnius), 1453 (Lutsk)
- Term ended: 1422 (Samogitia), 1453 (Vilnius), 1453 (Lutsk)
- Successor: Petras da Leopoli (Samogitia), Nicholas of Šalčininkai (Vilnius)

Orders
- Rank: Bishop

Personal details
- Born: 1370 Vilnius, Grand Duchy of Lithuania
- Died: May 9, 1453 (aged 82–83) Vilnius, Grand Duchy of Lithuania
- Education: Master's degree (1408)
- Alma mater: Charles University in Prague, University of Siena

Matthias of Trakai or of Vilnius (Lithuanian: Motiejus Trakiškis; Latin: Matthias Vilnensis; c. 1370 in Vilnius – 9 May 1453 in Vilnius) was a Lithuanian Roman Catholic clergyman, the first Bishop of Samogitia from its establishment in 1417 until 1422 and the fifth Bishop of Vilnius from 4 May 1422 and the Bishop of Lutsk from 1453 until 9 May 1453 and an ex officio member of the Lithuanian Council of Lords. He was known for being against Poland's interests.

== Biography ==
Matthias was born in Vilnius, the capital city of the Grand Duchy of Lithuania. Matthias was a Lithuanian and Samogitian speaker. Both the Cathalogus episcoporum Vilnensium and the Katalog Słuszki provides information that Matthias parents were Germans. Matthias is described in the Chancellery of the Lithuanian Grand Duke Vytautas the Great, accounts of papal legates and The Calendar of the Cracow Cathedral as Lithuanian. According to the Polish historian Jan Długosz, Matthias father was a German from Livonia and he was considered as Lithuanian because he had long lived in Vilnius. According to the Lithuanian historian Albert Wijuk Kojałowicz, Matthias was "a Vilnius' resident of Lithuanian nationality".

Matthias graduated from Charles University in Prague with the Master's degree in liberal arts in 1408, and studied in the University of Siena afterwards. Serving as the dean of Trakai, the Grand Duchy of Lithuania, he participated in the Christianization of Samogitia and was a supporter of Vytautas' political aspirations and an active participant in his coronation matters. Matthias was nominated to the newly established post of Samogitian bishop by Vytautas the Great and was consecrated on 24 October 1417 in Trakai.

The bishop has conducted the marriage of the King of Poland and Grand Duke of Lithuania Jogaila to his last wife Sophia of Halshany in the city of Navahrudak in 1422; he became the bishop of the Diocese of Vilnius later that year. Matthias sent representatives to the Council of Basel and set up the Inquisition to combat the Hussites, founded many churches and strenuously defended the rights and privileges of the Lithuanians. Matthias took care that new Catholic priests being ordained would be fluent in the Lithuanian language. According to Długosz, Matthias did great harm to the Poles, especially in the matter of Volhynia and Podolia. He performed Last Rites for the dying Vytautas on 27 October 1430.
