= History of Civilization in Poland =

Cycle of twelve paintings by Jan Matejko

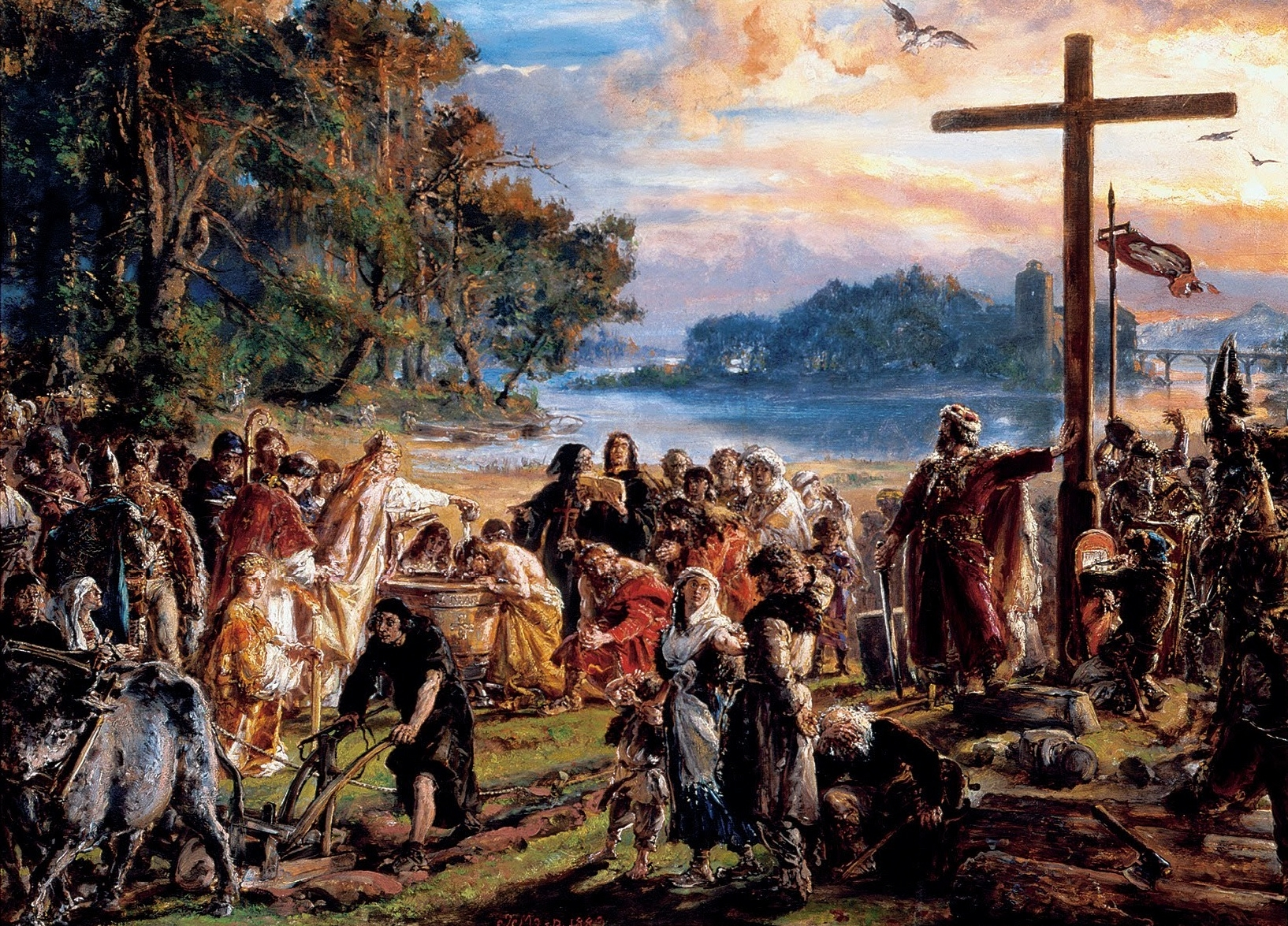
Introduction of Christianity to Poland, A.D. 966, the first painting in the series

History of Civilization in Poland (Polish: Dzieje Cywilizacji w Polsce) is a cycle of twelve oil sketches on canvas and wood, created by the Polish nominal painter Jan Matejko in 1889 with accompanying commentaries. The originals are kept at the Museum of the Royal Castle, Warsaw.

== History ==
Matejko created his series along with an accompanying commentary in part to fulfill a set of research requirements for his new academic title, the degree of Doctor of Philosophy honoris causa, which he received from the Jagiellonian University. Much of the imagery of the cycle has been inspired by the lectures of historian Józef Szujski which Matejko might have attended around 1877–1878, or read in print afterward.

=== The works in the series ===
The cycle consists of the following paintings:

#	Title	Image
1.	Zaprowadzenie chrześcijaństwa (Adoption of Christianity); 1889, oil on wood panel, 79cm x 120cm	
2.	Koronacja pierwszego króla (Coronation of the First King); 1889, oil on wood panel, 71cm x 105cm	
3.	Przyjęcie Żydów (Reception of the Jews); 1889, oil on canvas, 76cm x 112cm	
4.	W Łęczycy pierwszy sejm - Spisanie praw - Ukrócenie rozbojów (The First Parliament in Łęczyca); 1888, oil on wood panel, 74cm x 110cm	
5.	Klęska Legnicka - Odrodzenie (Defeat at Legnica); 1888, oil on wood panel, 74.5cm x 109.5cm	
6.	Powtórne zajęcie Rusi - Bogactwo i oświata (Retaking of Rus); 1888, oil on wood panel, 79.5cm x 110cm	
7.	Założenie Szkoły Głównej przeniesieniem do Krakowa ugruntowane (Founding of the Academy); 1889, oil on wood panel, 79.5cm x 62cm	
8.	Chrzest Litwy (The Baptism of Lithuania); 1889, oil on canvas, 60cm x 115.5cm	
9.	Wpływ Uniwersytetu na kraj w wieku XV - Nowe prądy - Husytyzm i Humanizm (New Trends in the 15 Century Poland); 1889, oil on wood panel, 69cm x 116cm	
10.	Złoty wiek literatury w XVI wieku - Reformacja - Przewaga katolicyzmu (The Golden Age in Literature); 1889, oil on wood panel, 69cm x 107cm	
11.	Potęga Rzeczypospolitej u zenitu - Złota wolność - Elekcja (Power of Commonwealth at its Zenith); 1889, oil on canvas, 72.5cm x 113cm	
12.	Konstytucja 3 maja - Sejm Czteroletni - Komisja Edukacyjna (Constitution of the 3 May); 1889, oil on wood panel, 79cm x 120cm: Another painting, not based on this sketch, Constitution of May 3, 1791, was completed in 1891.	
