= Bogusław Korwin Gosiewski =

Polish nobleman (1669–1744)

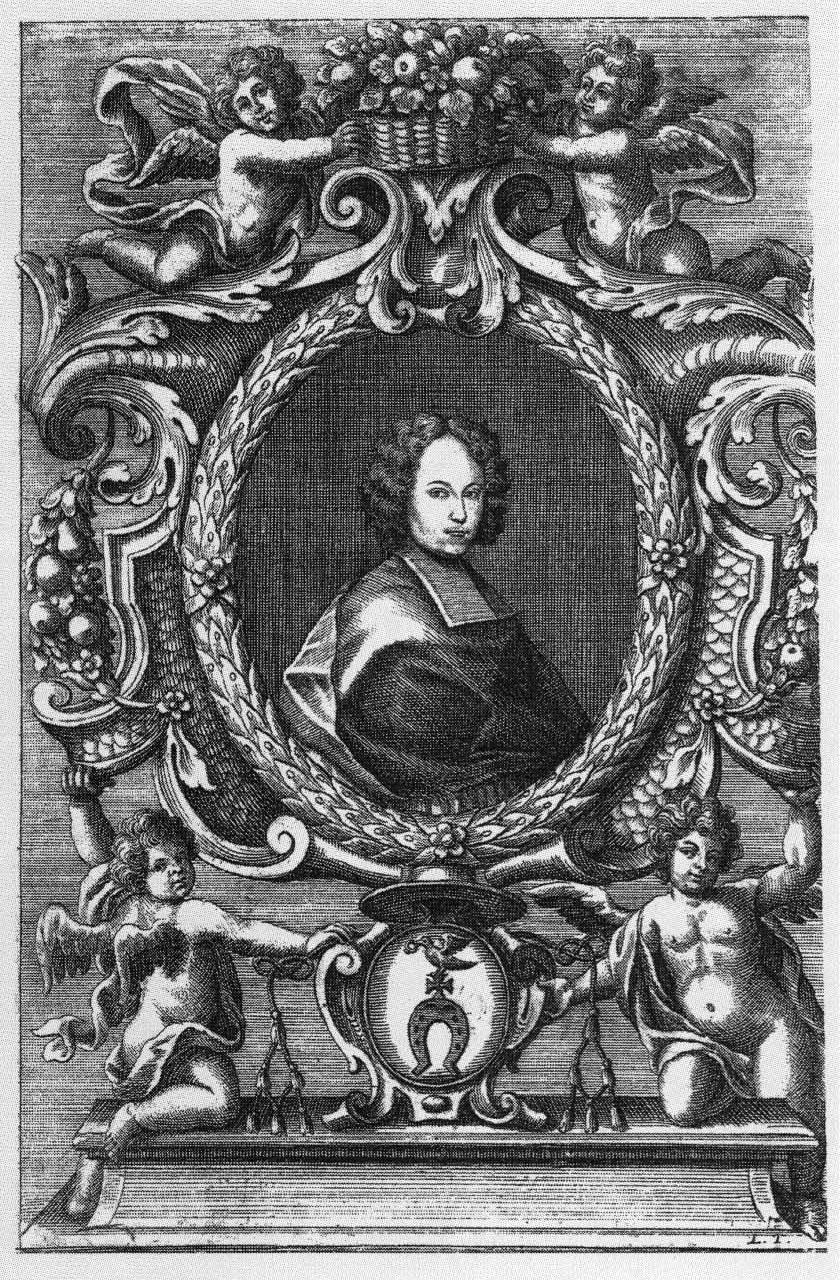
- Installed: 1725–1744

Orders
- Ordination: 28 October 1693
- Consecration: 20 April 1722

Personal details
- Born: 1669
- Died: 23 November 1744 (aged 74–75)

Bogusław Korwin Gosiewski de armis Ślepowron (1669 – 23 June 1744) – Bishop of Smolensk on 29 January 1725, Lithuanian Great (Clergyman) Quartermaster in 1720, Preceptor and Curator of Vilnius Cathedral, Vicar of Onikszty. Contrary to what numerous studies say he wasn't a son of the Lithuanian Field Commander Wincenty Korwin Gosiewski and Magdalena Konopacka, but of general of Lithuanian artillery Maciej Korwin Gosiewski and Małgorzata Szwab.

During the Lithuanian Civil War (1700) he supported the opponents to almighty Sapieha family. In 1722 became Auxiliary Bishop of Vilnius and Titular Bishop of Achantus. In 1723, the chapter elected him as ruler of the Roman Catholic Archdiocese of Vilnius, and in 1725, became Bishop of Smolensk. In 1729, as one of the leaders of the opposition in the Grand Duchy of Lithuania against Augustus II the Strong, which was organizing by the French Ambassador in Poland, Antoine-Felix Marquis of Monti, who promoted to the throne Stanisław Leszczyński. Under the agreement, France would pay 60 thousand pounds for each subsequent rupture of the Parliament for the life of Augustus II. At the same time, together with Lithuanian opponents to the Wettin king, seek the Russian support against the absolutist aspirations of Augustus II.

Gosiewski, embittered by the lack of nominations for the Diocese of Vilnius, was the protagonist of a scandal in custom, when in 1730, at a banquet, at which were present the entire chapter he threw glass and bottle to the new bishop of Vilnius, Michael Zienkowicz. In 1730, the Marquis of Monti (through Gosiewski) broke the parliament in Grodno. In 1732, in the same way Gosiewski broke the parliament in Warsaw, getting the sum of money from the French Embassy (60 thousand pounds). For the same reasons the Russian ambassador Friedrich Casimir Count von Löwenwolde paid him and Antoni Kazimierz Sapieha 1000 gold coins. Gosiewski himself also got 4 couples of zibeline martens and 100 gold coins.

== Family ==
Bogusław Korwin Gosiewski came from the Ślepowron branch of the family.

== Sources ==
- Bishop Bogusław Korwin Gosiewski
- Jan Paweł Gosiewski (2023). "Biskup Bogusław Korwin Gosiewski (1669–1744): zarys biografii" (PDF). Rocznik Lituanistyczny (in Polish) (tom 9): 111–159.

Catholic Church titles
Preceded by Karol Piotr Pancerzyński	Bishop of Smolensk; 1725–1744	Succeeded by Jerzy Mikołaj Hylzen
