= Piotr Parczewski =

Nałęcz coat of arms used by Piotr Parczewski

Piotr Parczewski (Belarusian: Пётр Парчэўскі, romanized: Pyotr Parchewski; Lithuanian: Petras Parčevskis; 1590 – 6 December 1658) was the Roman Catholic Bishop of Smolensk and the Bishop of Samogitia (now Roman Catholic Archdiocese of Kaunas). He was also a royal secretary and a Catholic convert from Orthodoxy.

== Biography ==
Parczewski was born in an Orthodox family. After the adoption of Catholicism, he entered in the seminary of Vilnius and was later sent to the Papal Seminary in Braniewo. He continued his studies at the Vilnius University where he received the master's degree in philosophy in 1622. Later, Parczewski earned a doctorate in theology and was ordained to the priesthood in 1628, became rector in Starodub. In 1630, became the administrator of the Diocese of Smolensk. During the Smolensk War in 1632–1634, he remained besieged in Smolensk. In 1635, King Wladyslaw IV Vasa appointed him as the first bishop of Smolensk, and then Parczewski went to Rome to obtain the approval of the new diocese, which was received on September 1, 1636. On September 7 of the same year, he was ordained a bishop by Cardinal Giovanni Battista Pamphili (future Pope Innocent X). At the end of 1649, Parczewski became bishop of Samogitia. In 1651, carried out a visitation of the diocese. During the Swedish Deluge, on 18 August 1655, he signed the Treaty of Kėdainiai, an instrument of surrender to Charles X Gustav of Sweden. On October 20 of that year, he signed the Union of Kėdainiai which established the Swedish–Lithuanian union. Parczewski died on 6 December 1658.

== Sources ==
- Henry Lulewicz, Peter Parczewski, in Polish Biographical Dictionary, Volume XXV, 1980, pp. 210–212.
- Hierarchy medii Catholica et recentioris Aevi, Volume IV, Monasteri 1935, p 318 (Latin).
- Hierarchy of Catholica medii et recentioris Aevi, Volume IV, Monasteri 1935, p 304.

Catholic Church titles
Preceded by none	Bishop of Smolensk; 1636–1649	Succeeded by Franciszek Dołmat Isajkowski
Preceded by Jerzy Tyszkiewicz	Bishop of Samogitia; 1649–1658	Succeeded by Aleksander Kazimierz Sapieha
