= Andrzej Jastrzębiec =

Polish Catholic priest and diplomat

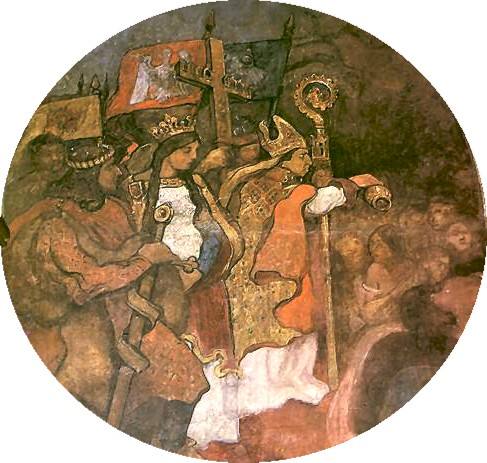
- Fresco displaying Andrzej during the Christianization of Lithuania
- Coat of arms: Jastrzębiec
- Died: 14 November 1398 in Wilno

Andrzej Jastrzębiec (died 1398), also known as Andrzej Wasilko or Andrzej Polak, was a Polish Catholic priest and diplomat, a first bishop of Seret and of Vilnius. He was part of the Jastrzebiec ancestral line of the szlachta (noble families) of Poland. He joined the Franciscans and quickly rose through the ranks of the order.

The first verified mention of Andrzej Jastrzębiec dates back to 1354, when he was listed among the parochs in Mazovia. After a brief time spent as a missionary in the pagan Grand Duchy of Lithuania, he moved to the royal court of Hungary, where he became the confessor to Elizabeth of Poland, Queen of Hungary. From there he set off to Moldavia, where he spent several years as a missionary. As an effect of his mission, on 31 July 1370 a new bishopric of Seret was created and the following year Andrzej became its first bishop.

Already in 1372 he moved back to Poland, where he took over the diocese of Halych. Between 1376 and 1386 he served as an auxiliary bishop in the diocese of Gniezno. In 1388, king Władysław II of Poland sent Andrzej with a mission to baptise Lithuania. Following the creation of a diocese of Vilnius, Andrzej became its first bishop. He died on 14 November 1398 and was succeeded by his deputy, Jakub Plichta.

== See also ==
- Wojciech Jastrzębiec

Catholic Church titles
Preceded by none	Bishop of Seret; 1371–1386	Succeeded by Jan
Preceded by none	Bishop of Wilno; 1388–1398	Succeeded by Jakub Plichta
