= Jan Stefan Giedroyć =

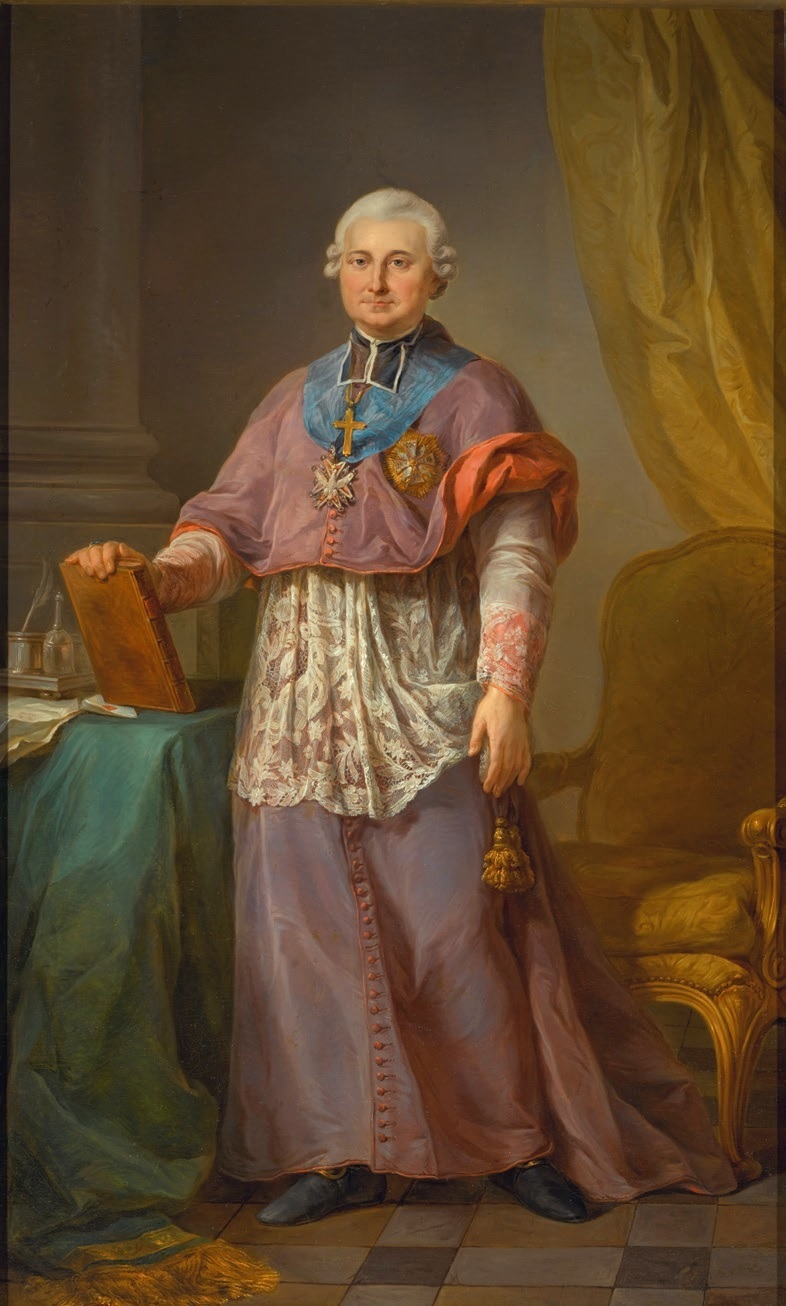
Portrait of the Bishop of Samogitia Jan Stefan Giedroyć, workshop of Marcello Bacciarelli

Jan Stefan Giedroyć (born February 2, 1730, in Vilnius, died May 13, 1802, in Alsėdžiai) was the Bishop of Samogitia from March 30, 1778, and the Bishop of Inflanty and Piltyń from 1764.

== Biography ==
His father was Benedykt Giedroyć, the Stolnik of Vilnius, and his mother was Zofia née Wołczak. In 1755, he became a member of the Vilnius Chapter. As a protégé of Vilnius Bishop Ignacy Jakub Massalski, he quickly advanced politically during the reign of King Stanisław August Poniatowski. In 1764, he became the bishop of Inflanty. The following year, he was delegated to the Uniate Synod in Brest.

As a King supporter he strongly condemned the Bar Confederation. He reported the Vilnius nobility's preparations for insurgency to the Russian army stationed near the city. However, during the Partition Sejm of 1773, he considered publicly defending the integrity of the Commonwealth. He is said to have declared, "If a martyr is needed, I shall be one." The king barely persuaded him to abandon what was deemed a suicidal act. Soon after, however, Giedroyć became one of Russia’s staunchest supporters.

With Russian and royal backing, he was appointed Bishop of Samogitia in 1778. In 1779, he became a member of the Department of Justice of the Permanent Council. His tenure was marked by accusations of greed in accumulating benefices and nepotism, as he promoted his Giedroyć relatives to Church positions. He also served as a councilor of the Permanent Council in 1778 and 1780, spending four years in its Treasury Department.

A member of the Four-Year Sejm, he was a judge in the Senate court for the Grand Duchy of Lithuania in 1791. He opposed the Constitution of May 3, 1791, and strongly supported the Targowica Confederation. His name appeared on Russian envoy Yakov Bulgakov’s 1792 list of senators and deputies whom Russia could rely on to overturn the May 3rd Constitution, as the only bishop alongside Józef Kazimierz Kossakowski.

After the suppression of the Kościuszko Uprising, Giedroyć ordered the arrest of a priest in his diocese who had insulted Catherine II, earning him the gratitude of Russian envoy Nikolai Repnin. In 1801, after being struck by paralysis, he transferred authority over the diocese to his coadjutor, Józef Arnolf Giedroyć.

He died on May 13, 1802, at his residence in Alsėdžiai near Telšiai. He was a Knight of the Order of the White Eagle and received the Order of Saint Stanislaus in 1766.

== Bibliography ==
- Turkowski, Tadeusz (1958). "Jan Stefan Giedroyć". Polski Słownik Biograficzny (in Polish). Vol. 7. Wrocław. pp. 427–428.
