= Adam Stanisław Krasiński (bishop) =

Bishop of Vilnius (1810–1891)

- Bishop of Vilnius
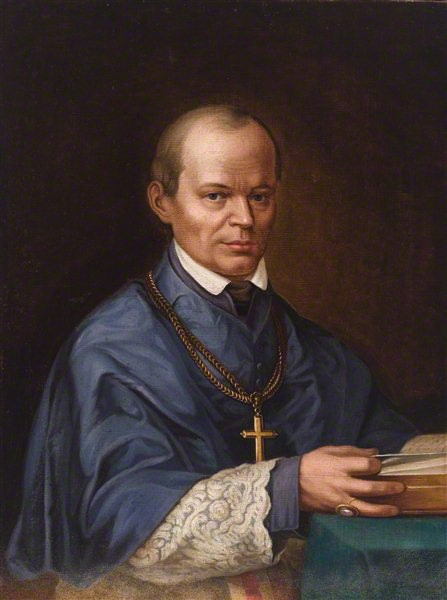
- Bolesław Rusiecki – Portrait of Bishop Adam Stanisław Krasiński
- Church: Roman Catholic Church
- Diocese: Diocese of Vilnius
- Appointed: 27 September 1858
- Term ended: 1883

Orders
- Ordination: 23 May 1836
- Consecration: 13 February 1859 by Wacław Żyliński

Personal details
- Born: December 24, 1810 Wiełnicze, Volhynian Governorate, Russian Empire
- Died: May 9, 1891 (aged 80) Kraków
- Buried: Rakowicki Cemetery

Adam Stanisław Krasiński, SP (24 December 1810 – 9 May 1891) was a Polish Roman Catholic bishop, writer, poet, and philologist. He served as Bishop of Vilnius from 1858 to 1883.

== Biography ==
He was born on 24 December 1810 in the village of Wełnicze in Volhynia, into a minor noble family of Stefan Krasiński of the Ślepowron coat of arms and Agnieszka, née Wiszniewska. He studied at the Basilian school in Huszcza, and then at the Piarist gymnasium in Międzyrzecz Korecki. In 1827, he entered the Piarist novitiate in Lubieszów, where he in 1827 became a teacher.

Krasiński began his religious life in the Order of Poor Clerics Regular of the Mother of God of the Pious Schools. He taught the Polish language and in 1836 published Polish Grammar for Children in Vilnius. The school was closed, and he then left for Vilnius, where on 23 May 1836 he received priestly ordination, without taking monastic vows.

He went to Saint Petersburg, where in the years 1837–1839 he taught at the school attached to the Church of St. Stanislaus. He then returned to Vilnius, where he worked as a preacher at the cathedral parish and taught religion. In the years 1842–1853 he served as parish priest in Giedraičiai.

In 1853, as a member of the Vilnius Cathedral Chapter, he was appointed its delegate to the Spiritual College and departed for Saint Petersburg. He held this position in the years 1853–1858. During this time, he carried out intensive literary and philological work. In 1856, he published a Polish translation of The Tale of Igor's Campaign, a Old Church Slavonic poem from the 12th century.

On 27 September 1858, he was appointed Bishop of Vilnius; his episcopal consecration took place on 17 February 1859 at the Church of St. Catherine. In April 1859, he left Saint Petersburg and went to Vilnius. In 1861, in Vilnius, he published the first Polish-language textbook of canon law. In the same year, he spent the summer in France, which resulted in a scholarly work concerning the Reims Gospel.

Although he did not support the January Uprising of 1863, he also refused to cooperate with the Russian imperial authorities. As a result, he was exiled from 1863 to 1882 to Vyatka. During his exile he worked on his dictionary Synonimy języka polskiego (Synonyms of the Polish Language).

After being released from exile, and forbidden to return to Vilnius, he settled in Kraków. He spent the remainder of his life in the Piarist monastery, where he wrote scholarly works on Polish philology, translated Roman authors, and composed poetry. For his academic achievements, he was elected a full member of the Academy of Learning. In 1887 he received an honorary doctorate from the Jagiellonian University.

He was buried at Rakowicki Cemetery in Kraków.

== Selected works ==
- Translation of Ars Poetica by Horace (1835)
- Polish Grammar for Children (1836)
- Literary Almanac (1835, 1838, 1843)
- Dictionary of Polish Synonyms (1885, 2 volumes)
- Aphorisms in Verse (1888; 2nd ed. 1906)
- Memoirs (1901)

== Bibliography ==
- Franciszek Ziejka (2007). In the Service of the Fatherland and the Lady of Jasna Góra. Alma Mater, no. 94.
- Mieczysław Żywczyński, "Adam Stanisław Krasiński", in: Polski Słownik Biograficzny, vol. XV, 1970, pp. 166–168.
