= Jerzy Białłozor =

Polish-Lithuanian nobleman and bishop

- Bishop of Vilnius; Bishop of Smolensk
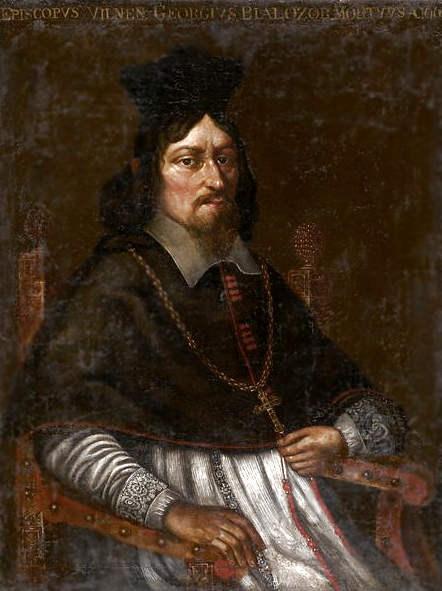

Personal details
- Born: Circa 1622 Biała Podlaska, Crown of the Kingdom of Poland, Polish–Lithuanian Commonwealth
- Died: 12 November 1665 Vilnius, Grand Duchy of Lithuania, Polish–Lithuanian Commonwealth

Jerzy Białłozor (Lithuanian: Jurgis Bialozoras; c. 1622–1665) was a Polish nobleman of Wieniawa coat of arms, bishop of Smoleńsk since 1658 and Vilnius since 21 November 1661, secretary of the King of Poland and Grand Duke of Lithuania. He helped to preserve the sarcophagus of Saint Casimir, a part of the treasury of Vilnius Cathedral and Cathedral chapter's archive during the mid-17th century Russian invasion of Vilnius.

Son of Krzysztof Białłozor the Marshal of Upita and starost of Abele.

Catholic Church titles
Preceded by Hieronim Władysław Sanguszko	Bishop of Smolensk; 1658–1661	Succeeded by Kazimierz Pac
Preceded by Jan Krzysztof Zawisza Dowgiałło	Bishop of Vilnius; 1661–1665	Succeeded by Aleksander Kazimierz Sapieha
