= Woyna =

- Abraham Woyna, Roman Catholic priest, bishop of Vilnius (and other offices)
- Jerzy Woyna Orlewicz (born 1943), Polish alpine skier
- Marian Woyna Orlewicz (1913–2011), Polish cross-country skier

== See also ==
- Category:Clan of Trąby
