= Tymoteusz Paweł Gorzeński =

Polish Bishop (1743–1825)

His Excellency Tymoteusz Gorzeński
- Archbishop of Gniezno; Primate of Poland
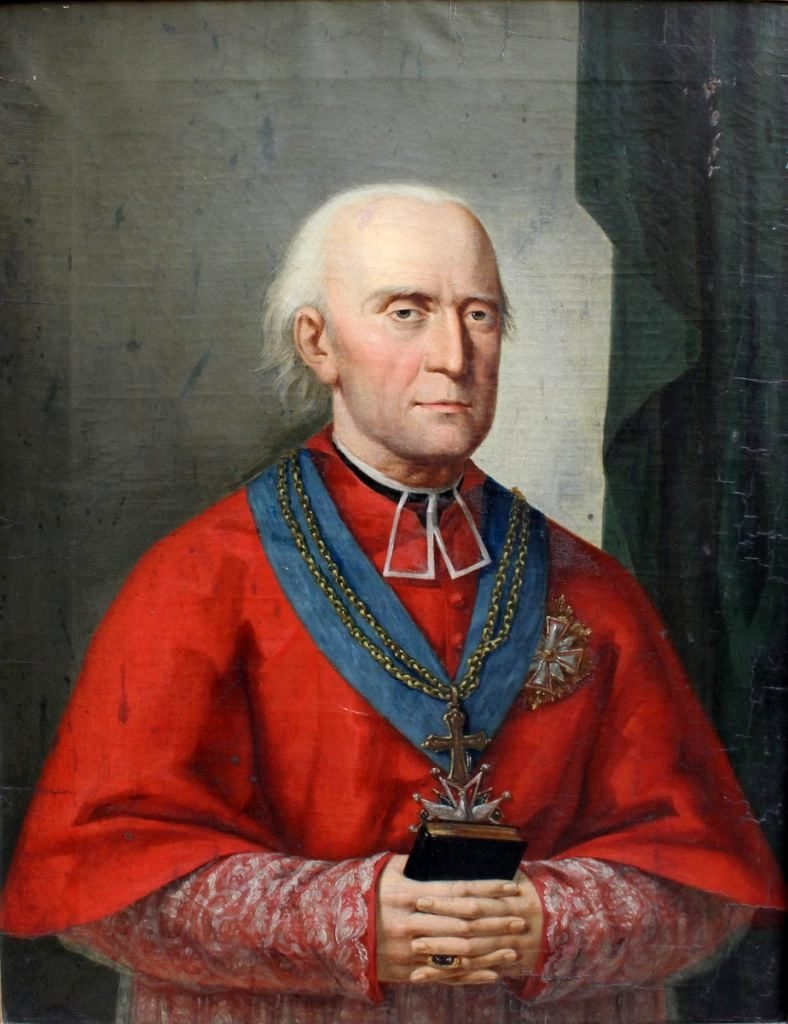
- Tymoteusz Gorzeński
- Church: Roman Catholic
- Archdiocese: Gniezno
- Installed: 1821
- Term ended: 1825

Orders
- Ordination: 14 March 1767
- Consecration: 4 June 1790

Personal details
- Born: 20 March 1743 Dobrzyca
- Died: 20 December 1825 (aged 82) Poznań
- Coat of arms

Timothy Gorzeński (1743–1825) was a Polish Bishop of the Roman Catholic Church. He was Bishop of Poznań from 1809 to 1825, Archbishop of Gniezno and Primate of Poland from 1821 to 1825.

== Early life ==
He was born into the Nałęcz noble family on March 20, 1743, in Dobrzyca His parents Francis and Anna née Deręgowska were owners of the Dobrzyce estate.

In 1765 he began theological studies at the Seminary of the Missionin Kraków and in 1763, with the Pontifical commissions, he became Canon at the Poznań Cathedral, and in 1776 a Canon at the Cathedral of Kraków. He was also at this time Rector of St. Michael's Hospice, Kraków. In 1775 he went to Rome, where he studied law returning to Poznań in 1777, and later back to Kraków.

== Career ==
In 1780 he moved to Warsaw as a delegate of the Kraków Curia to the main Court of the Crown. A year later he received the Order of Saint Stanislaus and the position of clerk of the Holy Crown. Beginning in 1788, he served as Chancellor of the Duchy of Severian, as it turned out as the last. In 1790 he was the nominal Bishop of Smolensk Oblast.

He was a member of the Confederation of the four-year Sejm where he pushed for the introduction of the Constitution of 3 May. After the Third Partition of Poland he returned to Kraków then briefly resided in Vienna, and in 1804 he moved again to Poznań. Where Frederick William III appointed him Bishop of Poznań in 1806, but the Napoleonic Wars prevented his induction until 1808. In 1810 he began work on establishing the Poznań University.

== Primacy ==
In 1821 Pope Pius VII raised the bishopric of Poznań to merge with the metropolis of Gniezno in a personal union based in Poznań and Gorzeński became primate, although in 1822 Friedrich Wilhelm III forbade him to use the title. As Archbishop at the Cathedral of Poznań he brought many vestments, crockery, furniture, and other valuables. He founded the Church of St. Timothy in Białężynie.

In 1785 was made a Knight in the Prussian Order of the Red Eagle.

He died on December 20, 1825, in Poznań. After his death, was buried in Poznań Cathedral, in the chapel of Szołdrskich, where his ashes were moved to the crypt. His heart according to his will and testament is in the basement of Gniezno Cathedral.
