= Jan Karol Dowgiałło Zawisza =

Polish clergyman and bishop

Jan Karol Dowgiałło Zawisza (1597 – 9 March 1661) was a Polish clergyman and bishop for the Roman Catholic Diocese of Vilnius. He became ordained in 1657. He was appointed bishop in 1656. He died on 9 March 1661.
