= Kazimierz Pac =

Polish nobleman and bishop (died 1696)

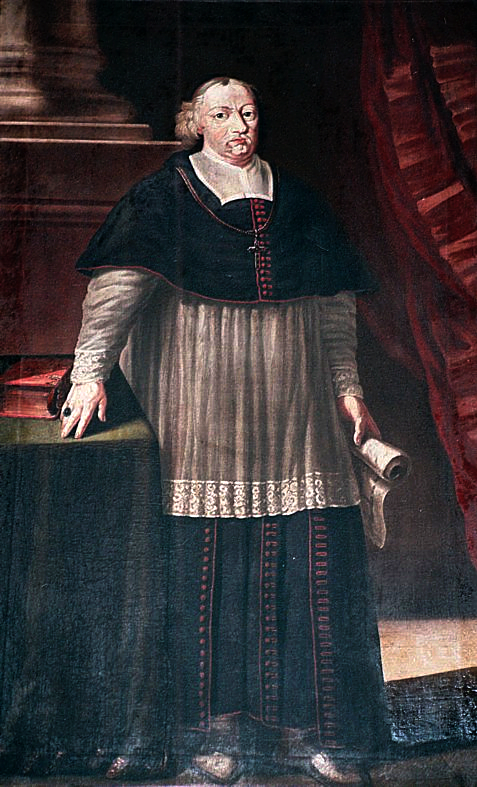
- Coat of arms: Gozdawa
- Died: 1696
- Noble family: Pac
- Father: Piotr Pac

Kazimierz Pac (died 1696) was a Polish nobleman and bishop of Smoleńsk since 1664 and Samogitia since 3 October 1667, canon of Wilno since 1657.

Son of Piotr Pac and brother of Hetman Michał Kazimierz Pac.

== Bibliography ==
- Pacowie: materyjały historyczno-genealogiczne / ułożone i wydane przez Józefa Wolffa, 1885, pp. 137-141
- Jan Władysław Poczobut Odlanicki, Pamiętnik, Warsaw 1987
- A. Rachuba, Kazimierz Pac. In: Polski Słownik Biograficzny, Vol. XXIV, 1979, pp. 706–707.

Catholic Church titles
Preceded by Jerzy Białłozor	Bishop of Smoleńsk; 1664–1667	Succeeded by Gothard Jan Tyzenhauz
Preceded by Aleksander Kazimierz Sapieha	Bishop of Samogitia; 1667–1695	Succeeded by Jan Hieronim Kryszpin-Kirszensztein
