= Abraham Woyna =

Polish-Lithuanian bishop

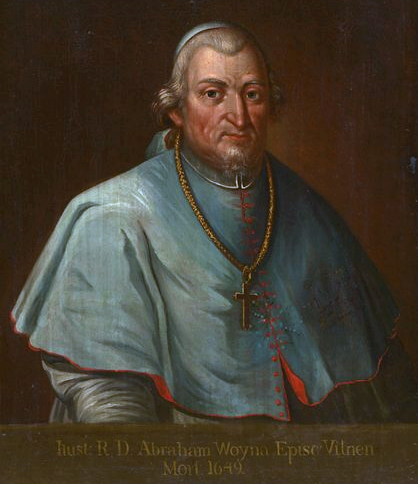
- Coat of arms: Trąby
- Born: 1569
- Died: 1649 (aged 79–80)
- Father: Szymon castelan of Mścisław
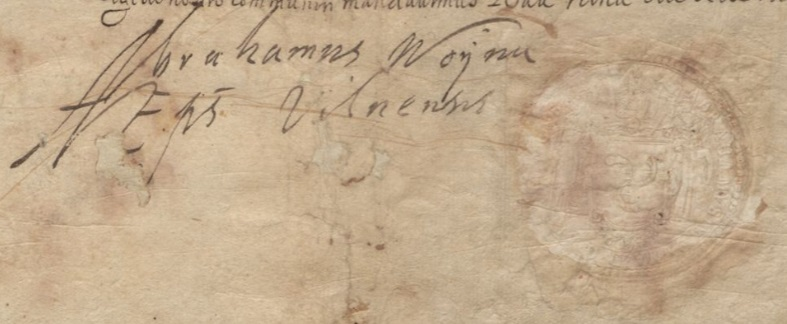
- Signature

Abraham Woyna (Wojna; Lithuanian: Abraomas Vaina) (1569–1649) was a Roman Catholic priest and auxiliary bishop of Vilnius (1611–1626), bishop of Samogitia (1626–1631) and then bishop of Vilnius (1631–1649). His term in office was marked by the rise of Calvinism in the Polish–Lithuanian Commonwealth, to which he was actively opposed.

== Bishop of Vilnius ==
Among his achievements was the foundation of the monasteries of the Discalced Carmelites and the Good Friars in Vilna (modern Vilnius, Lithuania), the latter of which also opened up a hospital and a pharmacy nearby. Two synods were held in the Vilnius diocese while Woyna was bishop, in 1631 and 1635; in 1633, Woyna ordered the compilation of the resolutions of various prior synods, titled "Constitutiones Synodorum dioecesis Vilnensis diversis temporibus celebratarum Jussu".

The previous bishop, Eustachy Wołłowicz, had supported the church authorities' decision to transfer the church built by Piotr Korkonos in 1616 to the Canons Regular of the Lateran, but a lack of funds when the first two monks arrived in 1625 meant the foundation was postponed. Woyna issued an official document for the foundation of a parish in 1638 at Rokantiškės.

In 1636, Woyna, along with four others, signed a commissary decree regarding the housing of the Jewish populace within the city. Specifically, the decree established tenement housing for the Jewish populace following what the text refers to as "tumults" in 1634. It also included a provision increasing the annual fee required of the Jewish citizenry, doubling the peacetime fee agreed on in 1630 from 300 złotys to 600.

He also led the anti-Protestant faction in the local politics and led the persecution of the Calvinist activists. In November 1641, Jesuit wards beat a preacher named Chelchonski as he returned from administering communion; he and another preacher named Gedarla were both attacked when returning from a feast held by Janusz Radziwiłł. When petitioned to punish the offenders, Woyna responded that he would not, as it was his job to "exterminate heretics". Another such effort was an accusation of sacrilege against Krzysztof Radziwiłł brought before the diet in 1646 where Woyna demanded a sentence be rendered based on only the evidence he presented. The debate lasted five days, with the measure eventually being defeated.

== Bibliography ==
- Wileński słownik biograficzny. Bydgoszcz: 2002. ISBN 83-87865-28-1.

Catholic Church titles
Preceded by Stanisław Kiszka	Bishop of Samogitia; 1626–1631	Succeeded by Merkelis Geišas (Melchior Gieysz)
Preceded by Eustachy Wołłowicz	Bishop of Vilnius; 1631–1649	Succeeded by Jerzy Tyszkiewicz
