= Bishop of Samogitia =

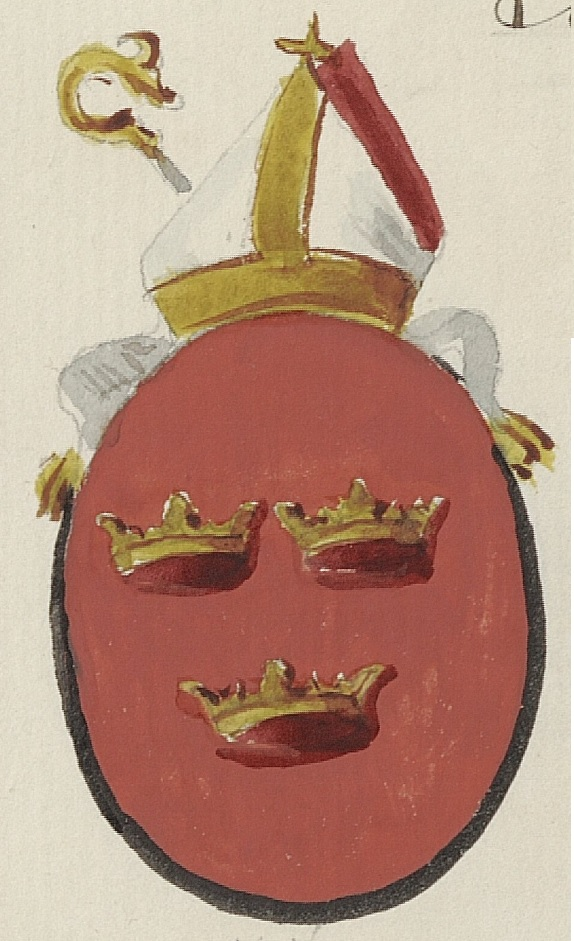
Coat of arms of the Roman Catholic Diocese of Samogitia

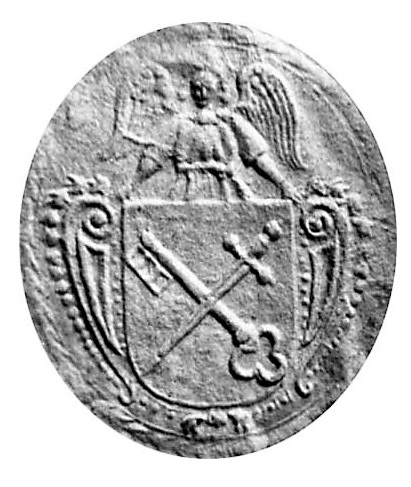
Coat of arms of the Cathedral Chapter of the Roman Catholic Diocese of Samogitia, 1738

The following is a list of the bishops of Samogitia, who administered the Diocese of Samogitia (now a part of Lithuania) from 1417 to 1926.

The seat of the diocese was in Varniai/Medininkai until 1864, when it was moved to Kaunas. It was promoted in 1926 as Archdiocese by Pope Pius XI with the new name of archdiocese of Kaunas. The first Samogitian Cathedral is now in the territory of Diocese of Telšiai.

Bishops of Samogitia
Matthias of Trakai	1417–1422
Mikołaj	1422–1434
Piotr	1434–1435
Jakub of Vilnius	1436–1439
Bartłomiej	1439–1453
Jerzy of Vilnius	1453–1464
Motiejus Topolietis	1464–1470
Baltramiejus Svirenkavičius	1471–1482
Martynas Žemaitis	1483–1492
Martynas Lintfaras	1492–1515
Mikołaj III Radziwiłł	1515–1530
Mikalojus Viežgaila	1531–1533
Vaclovas Virbickis	1534–1555
Jan Domanowski	1556–1563
Stanisław Narkuski	1564–1564
Wiktoryn Wierzbicki	1565–1567
Jurgis Petkūnas	1567–1574
Merkelis Giedraitis	1576–1609
Mikołaj Pac	1610–1618
Stanisław Kiszka	1618–1626
Abraham Woyna	1626–1631
Merkelis Geišas	1631–1633
Jerzy Tyszkiewicz	1633–1649
Piotr Parczewski	1649–1659
Aleksander Kazimierz Sapieha	1660–1667
Kazimierz Pac	1667–1695
Jan Hieronim Kryszpin-Kirszensztein	1695–1708
Jan Mikołaj Zgierski	1710–1713
Paweł Franciszek Sapieha	1715
Aleksander Gorajski	1716–1735
Józef Michał Karp	1736–1739
Antoni Dominik Tyszkiewicz	1740–1762
Jan Dominik Łopaciński	1762–1778
Jan Stefan Giedroyć	1778–1802
Juozapas Arnulfas Giedraitis	1802–1838
Szymon Mikołaj Giedroyć	1838–1844
Motiejus Valančius	1849–1875
Aleksandras Beresnevičius	1875–1883
Mečislovas Leonardas Paliulionis	1883–1908
Gasparas Feliksas Cirtautas	1910–1913
Pranciškus Karevičius (Franciszek Karewicz)	1914–1926
