= Kazimierz Dmochowski =

Roman Catholic archbishop (1779 – 1851)

- Archbishop of Mohilev
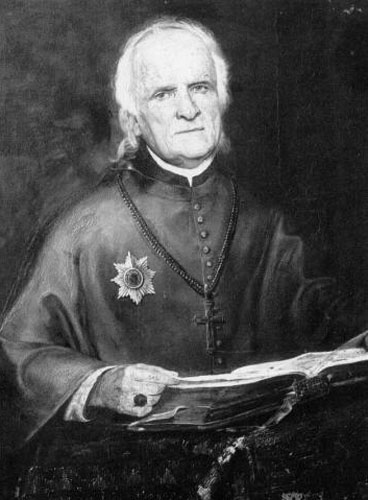
- Appointed: 3 July 1848
- Predecessor: Ignacy Ludwik Pawłowski
- Successor: Ignacy Hołowiński
- Previous post(s): Auxiliary bishop of Vilnius (1840 – 1848); Titular bishop of Meloë (1840 – 1848)

Orders
- Ordination: 6 February 1803
- Consecration: 29 June 1841 by Ignacy Ludwik Pawłowski

Personal details
- Born: 24 June 1779; Zabolotye
- Died: 11 January 1851 (aged 71); St. Petersburg

Kazimierz Dmochowski (24 June 1779 – 11 January 1851) was a Roman Catholic archbishop of the Archdiocese of Mohilev from 1848 until his death in 1851. He previously served as auxiliary bishop of the Diocese of Vilnius and titular bishop of Meloë from 1840 to 1848.

== Biography ==
Dmochowski was born in Zabolotye in 1779. He attended a Piarist secondary school at Luzkhi from when was 10 until he obtained his matura on 1 November 1797, after which he began attending the diocesan seminary at Krāslava; he transferred to the diocesan seminary at Vilnius in 1798. He was ordained a priest on 6 February [O.S. 25 January] 1803 at Vilnius. After his ordination, he served as a chaplain to Jan Nepomucen Kossakowski and Hieronim Stroynowski. He was appointed canon of Courland in 1807. Later, Dmochowski was appointed coadjutor cantor of the cathedral chapter of Vilnius on 26 February 1811; he was appointed canon regular on 10 December 1812. He was appointed assessor of the consistory of the Diocese of Vilnius in 1813.

In 1814, Dmochowski was appointed deputy of the ecclesiastical court at Vilnius and member of its cathedral council. He was awarded a doctorate in theology from the Akademia Połocka on 29 July 1818. Dmochowski later served at the Roman Catholic Ecclesiastical College in St. Petersburg from 1821 to 1823, when he was appointed dean of the cathedral chapter at Vilnius. He was appointed auxiliary bishop of the Diocese of Vilnius by Nicholas I of Russia on 31 March 1838; his appointment was confirmed by Pope Gregory XVI on 17 December 1840, and he was consecrated as auxiliary bishop of Vilnius and titular bishop of Meloë on 29 June 1841 at the Church of St. Catherine in Saint Petersburg by Ignacy Ludwik Pawłowski. He was appointed head of the Roman Catholic Ecclesiastical College in 1842.

On 3 July 1848, Dmochowski was appointed by Pope Pius IX as archbishop of the Archdiocese of Mohilev. He received his pallium at the Church of St. Catherine on 28 November 1848, and ceremonially assumed control of the Archdiocese at Mohilev Cathedral on 17 July 1849. As archbishop of Mohilev, Dmochowski opposed the closure of Catholic monasteries and Greek Catholic parishes in the Russian Empire. He also helped to construct a cemetery in Vyborgsky District. Dmochowski died in 1851 in Saint Petersburg and was buried in the Lutheran cemetery in Vyborgsky; his remains were moved to a Catholic cemetery in the same district in 1901.
