= Wacław Żyliński =

Roman Catholic archbishop (1803 – 1863)

- Archbishop of Mohilev
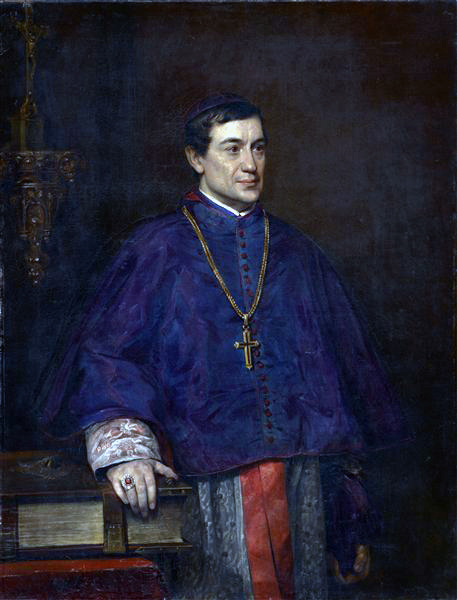
- Portrait of Żyliński (1849)
- Appointed: 18 September 1856
- Predecessor: Ignacy Hołowiński
- Successor: Antoni Fijałkowski
- Previous post(s): Bishop of Vilnius (1848–1856)

Orders
- Ordination: 2 April 1826 by Tadeusz Kundzicz
- Consecration: 5 December 1848 by Kazimierz Dmochowski

Personal details
- Born: 1 March 1803; Merkinė
- Died: 5 May 1863 (aged 60); St. Petersburg

Wacław Żyliński (1 March 1803 – 5 May 1863) was a Roman Catholic archbishop of the Archdiocese of Mohilev from 1856 to his death in 1863. He previously served as bishop of the Diocese of Vilnius from 1848 to 1856.

== Biography ==
Żyliński was born on 1 March 1803 in Merkinė. He was taught for one year by his father, Ludwik, and then attended a gymnasium in Vilnius. After graduating, he attended university for one year before beginning to attend the diocesan seminary in 1820, where he learnt theology for four years. Once he completed this education, he was ordained a deacon and made a preacher of the cathedral in Minsk. He was ordained a priest by Tadeusz Kundzicz in 1826; afterwards, he served as professor and regent of the diocesan seminary at Minsk. He was appointed canon of the cathedral chapter of the Diocese of Minsk on 11 April 1829. After being incardinated to the Diocese of Vilnius in 1832, he became a prelate capitular and served as court assessor of the Roman Catholic Ecclesiastical College in St. Petersburg for the Diocese of Vilnius. He was awarded the Order of Saint Vladimir, 4th class, on 12 August 1835.

On 19 November 1846, Żyliński was elected vicar capitular of the Diocese of Vilnius by its cathedral chapter. He was preconized as bishop of Vilnius on 3 July 1848; he was consecrated on 17 December 1848 at the Church of St. Catherine in St. Petersburg by Kazimierz Dmochowski. During his time as bishop of Vilnius, he was awarded the Order of Saint Stanislaus, 2nd class, and the Order of Saint Anna, 2nd class with crown; later, he was awarded the Order of Saint Stanislaus, 1st class, in May 1853. He was also awarded the 1st class of the Order of Saint Anna on 7 September 1856.

On 18 September 1856, Żyliński was appointed archbishop of the Archdiocese of Mohilev; he received his pallium on 9 December 1856. He was awarded the Order of the White Eagle on 29 April 1862. Żyliński died on 5 May 1863 in St. Petersburg.
