= Ignacy Ludwik Pawłowski =

Roman Catholic archbishop (1775 – 1842)

- Archbishop of Mohilev
- Appointed: 1 March 1840
- In office: 22 June 1841 – 20 June 1842
- Predecessor: Kacper Kazimierz Cieciszowski
- Successor: Kazimierz Dmochowski
- Previous post(s): Auxiliary bishop of Kamianets-Podilskyi (1827 – 1841); Titular bishop of Megara (1827 – 1841)

Orders
- Ordination: 22 July 1800
- Consecration: 15 February 1829 by Michał Piwnicki

Personal details
- Born: 4 February 1776; Bar
- Died: 2 July 1842 (aged 67); Tsarskoye Selo

Ignacy Ludwik Pawłowski, Korwin coat of arms (4 February 1776 – 2 July 1842) was a Roman Catholic archbishop of the Archdiocese of Mohilev from 1841 to his death in 1842. He previously served as auxiliary bishop of the Diocese of Kamianets-Podilskyi and titular bishop of Megara from 1827 to 1841.

== Biography ==
Ignacy Ludwik Pawłowski was born to Antoni and Franciszka Pawłowski (née Czechowska), who were szlachta from the Podolia region. After attending a Basilian school in Bar, he began attending the seminary in Kamianets-Podilskyi in November 1799. He was ordained a deacon on 17 July 1800, and was ordained to the presbyteriate on 22 July 1800. He was appointed secretary of the consistory at Kamianets in 1801; he was appointed as a canon of its cathedral chapter in 1803 and, in the same year, was assigned to a parish in Dunaivtsi. He was appointed assessor for the same consistory in 1804.

Pawłowski served as secretary to Jan Józef Dembowski between 1806 and 1809. He then served as assessor of the Roman Catholic Ecclesiastical College between 1815 and 1818. In 1817, he passed his examination from the Akademia Połocka, obtaining a doctorate in theology and canon law on 10 February of the same year. On 6 July 1817, Pawłowski was appointed chancellor of the cathedral chapter in Kamianets; he was also appointed vicar general of the diocese that same year. In 1822, he was appointed dean of the city's cathedral chapter. He became a fellow of the Roman Catholic Ecclesiastical College on 11 August 1824.

On 11 September 1825, Pawłowski was appointed coadjutor bishop of the Diocese of Kamianets-Podilskyi by Alexander I of Russia. He was appointed auxiliary bishop of the same diocese and titular bishop of Megara on 23 June 1828 by Pope Leo XII; he was consecrated on 3 February 1829 at the Church of St. Catherine by Michał Piwnicki, assisted by Mateusz Lipski and Ignacy Giedrojć. He was chairman of the Roman Catholic Ecclesiastical College between 1832 and 1842, and was awarded the Order of Saint Anna, first class, on 18 December 1833 for his zeal as chairman.

On 15 March 1839, Pawłowski was appointed archbishop of the Archdiocese of Mohilev; he took an oath before Russian authorities on 4 April 1839, assuming control of the archdiocese without confirmation from the Holy See. To prevent violations of canon law, he was appointed apostolic administrator of the Archdiocese on 28 April 1839. His appointment was approved by Pope Gregory XVI on 1 March 1841, and he was given his pallium on 22 June 1841 at the Church of St. Catherine by Walenty Maciej Bończa. He was awarded the Order of Saint Alexander Nevsky the same year.

As Archbishop of Mohilev, Pawłowski began the transition of the Saint Petersburg Roman Catholic Theological Academy from Vilnius to Saint Petersburg; he established a temporary commission to oversee this transition. He also issued a decree that approved staffing for monastaries and diocesan administrations in the Western Krai. He died on 2 July 1842 in Tsarskoye Selo, and was buried at St. John the Baptist Church in Saint Petersburg.
