= Aleksander Gintowt-Dziewałtowski =

Roman Catholic archbishop (1821 – 1889)

- Archbishop of Mohilev
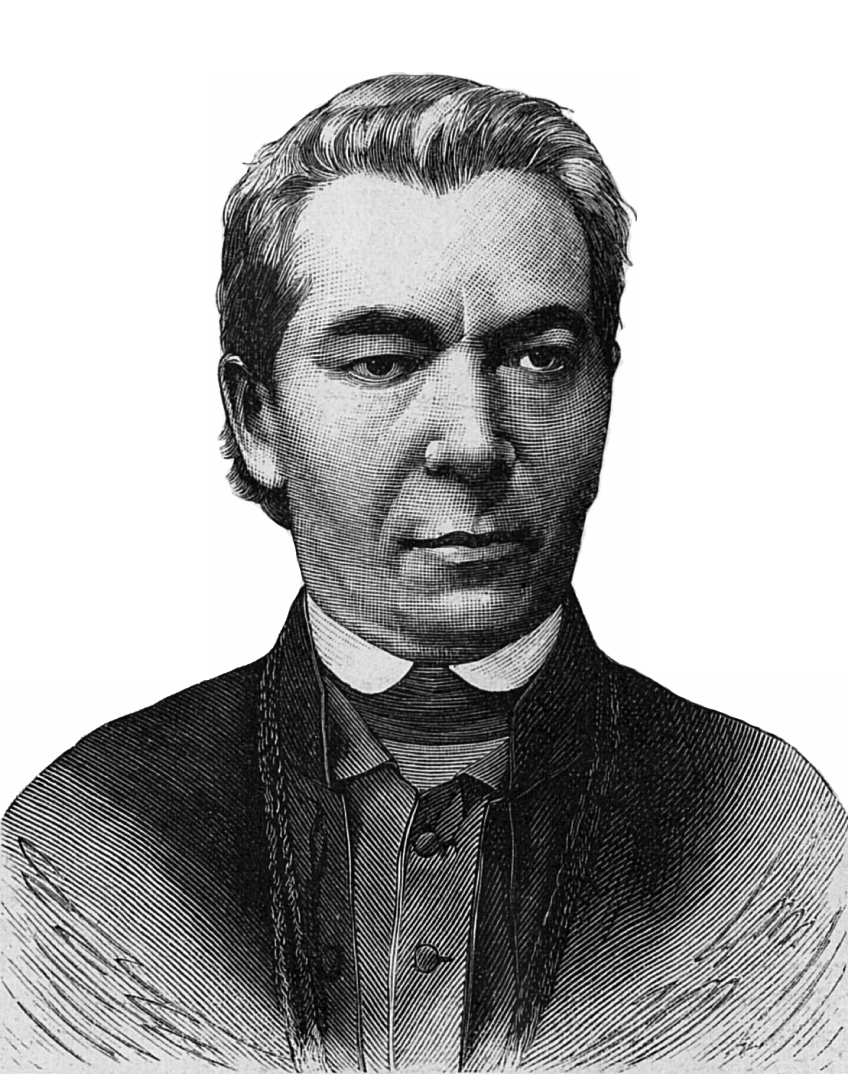
- Appointed: 15 March 1882
- In office: 13 May 1883 – 26 August 1889
- Predecessor: Antoni Fijałkowski
- Successor: Szymon Marcin Kozłowski
- Previous posts: Auxiliary bishop of Płock (1872 – 1883); Titular bishop of Helenopolis (1872 – 1883)

Orders
- Ordination: 9 June 1845 by Jan Kajetan Cywiński
- Consecration: 6 August 1872 by Antoni Fijałkowski

Personal details
- Born: 3 March 1821 Vaiškoniai
- Died: 26 August 1889 (aged 68) Duderhof Heights, Saint Petersburg

Aleksander Kazimierz Gintowt-Dziewałtowski (3 March 1821 – 26 August 1889) was a Roman Catholic archbishop of the Archdiocese of Mohilev from 1883 to his death in 1889. He previously served as auxiliary bishop of the Diocese of Płock and titular bishop of Helenopolis from 1872 to 1883.

== Biography ==
=== Early life and priesthood ===
Aleksander Kazimierz Gintowt-Dziewałtowski was born in Vaiškoniai to Antoni and Katarzyna Gintowt. He was educated at a gymnasium in Kėdainiai. After obtaining his matura, he attending Vilnius St. Joseph Seminary in 1839; he studied there until 1845, graduating with a bachelor's degree. He was ordained a priest on 9 June 1845 by Jan Kajetan Cywiński. After his ordination, he served as a parish priest in Ukmergė; 3 years later, in 1848, he was appointed catechist for its gymnasium. On 1 December 1849, he was appointed rector for the parish of Joniškis.

In October 1855, Gintowt-Dziewałtowski was appointed rector of a Bernardine parish in Grodno; he was appointed dean of Grodno on 7 October 1861, and was later appointed archdeacon of Białystok on 10 September 1864, which he would serve as until 31 October 1870. In the same year, he was appointed an honorary canon of the cathedral chapter of Sejny by Konstanty Ireneusz Łubieński.

Gintowt-Dziewałtowski was a member of a revolutionary organization based in Grodno during the January Uprising, though he did not participate in activities against the Russian government. He served as a confessor for political prisoners between 1863 and 1866. In 1870, he was barred from performing spiritual activities for 2 years and was exiled to Suwałki for refusing to use Russian in Catholic services and sermons.

=== Episcopate ===
On 11 February 1872, Gintowt-Dziewałtowski was appointed by Pope Pius IX as auxiliary bishop of the Diocese of Płock and titular bishop of Helenopolis. His appointment was approved by the Emperor of Russia on 2 June 1872, and he was consecrated on 6 August 1872 at the Church of St. Catherine by Antoni Fijałkowski, assisted by Wincenty Lipski and Jerzy Iwaszkiewicz. He became administrator of the Diocese in 1876, after the appointment of Wincenty Teofil Popiel as bishop of the Diocese of Kujawy-Kaliska. During this period, he was awarded the Order of Saint Stanislaus, 1st class.

Gintowt-Dziewałtowski was appointed archbishop of the Archdiocese of Mohilev and apostolic administrator of the Diocese of Minsk on 3 March 1883 by Pope Leo XIII; he was preconized on 15 March. His appointment was recognized by the Emperor of Russia on 13 April 1883, when he was appointed by decree to the archbishopric; he received his pallium on 13 May 1883 at the Church of St. Catherine by Wincenty Teofil Popiel. For this occasion, he was awarded the Order of Saint Anna, 1st class.

In the same year, he was appointed chairman of the Roman Catholic Ecclesiastical College in Saint Petersburg. As its chairman, he helped to reorganize it in accordance with a new charter, granted in 1882. He also began renovating the building where it was situated, with a library and art gallery being constructed. Gintowt-Dziewałtowski died on 26 August 1889 at Duderhof Heights; he was buried at Vyborg Cemetery, located in the crypt of the Cathedral of the Assumption of the Blessed Virgin Mary in Saint Petersburg.
