= Ignacy Hołowiński =

Catholic archbishop and writer (1807–1855)

- Archbishop of Mohilev
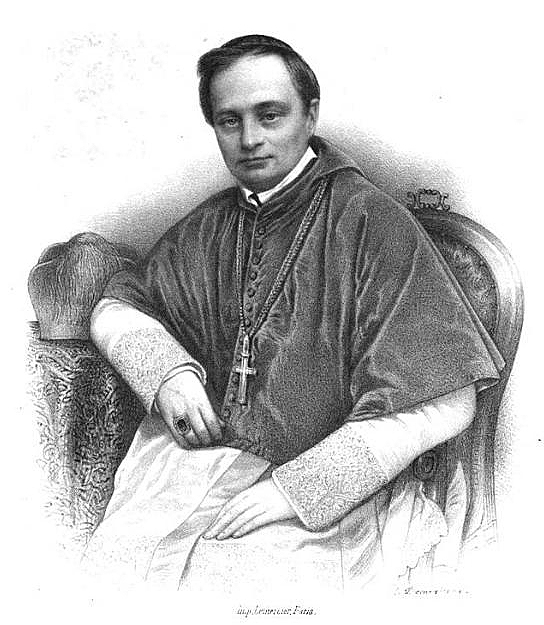
- Church: Catholic Church
- Appointed: 16 January 1851
- In office: 24 January 1851 – 19 October 1855
- Predecessor: Kazimierz Dmochowski
- Successor: Wacław Żyliński
- Previous posts: Coadjutor bishop of Mohilev (1848 – 1851); Titular bishop of Carystus (1848 – 1851)

Orders
- Ordination: 25 September 1830 by Michał Piwnicki
- Consecration: 30 November 1848 by Kazimierz Dmochowski

Personal details
- Born: 24 September 1807 Ovruch
- Died: 19 October 1855 (aged 48) Saint Petersburg

Ignacy Hołowiński (24 September 1807 – 19 October 1855), also known by the pennames Ignacy Kefaliński and Żegota Kostrowiec, was a Catholic archbishop of the Archdiocese of Mohilev, writer, translator, and literary critic. Hołowiński previously served as coadjutor bishop of the Archdiocese of Mohilev and titular bishop of Carystus from 1848 to 1851. He has been cited as the first person to translate a number of William Shakespeare's works into the Polish language.

== Biography ==
=== Early life and clerical career ===
Hołowiński was born on 24 September 1807 in Ovruch to Piotr and Dominika Hołowiński; he was baptized on 25 September. Between 1819 and 1825, he attended a gymnasium at Velyki Mezhyrichi, graduating with honors. On 29 September 1825, he began attending the diocesan seminary in Lutsk. He transferred to the University of Vilnius in January 1827, where he received a magister degree in theology in September 1830. He was ordained a priest on 25 September 1830 in Lutsk by Michał Piwnicki.

After his ordination, Hołowiński worked as a catechist at a school in Zytomierz. He was appointed a canon of the cathedral chapter of Zhytomyr in 1834 and was appointed its dean in 1835. On 25 February 1837, Hołowiński was appointed professor of theology at Saint Vladimir Imperial University of Kyiv. He later became rector of the Saint Petersburg Roman Catholic Theological Academy, as well as a professor of theology and homiletics, on 26 June 1842. He was awarded the Order of Saint Stanislaus, second class, in 1844, and the Order of Saint Anna, second class, in 1846.

=== Shakespeare translations ===
Noted as "the very first Polish translator of Shakespeare", Hołowiński began working on translations of William Shakespeare's works into the Polish language during the first half of the 1830s while at Zytomierz; he would ultimately translate ten of Shakespeare's plays. At Vilnius, he published two volumes of Shakespeare in the Polish language; these translations were named as the first to be translated into Polish using original sources. The first volume – including translations of Hamlet, Romeo and Juliet, and A Midsummer Night's Dream – was published in 1839 under the penname "Ignacy Kefaliński", while the second (which included translations of Macbeth, King Lear, and The Tempest) was published in 1841.

Inspired by Friedrich Schlegel, Hołowiński attempted to create a Polish form of the iambic pentameter of Shakespeare, though the metre of his translations varied. His translations were met with varied criticism; while they were praised by Józef Ignacy Kraszewski, writing for the Tygodnik Petersburski, others criticized them for experimenting with metre and for "general roughness". Ultimately, Hołowiński abandoned his translation work, with Placyd Jankowski continuing his efforts.

=== Writer & literary critic ===
Hołowiński's first works as a writer were his publications of Shakespeare, written under the Ignacy Kefaliński penname and published between 1839 and 1841. These translations were followed in 1840 by a translation of Petrarch, as well as translations of The Tablet of Cebes and the Enchiridion of Epictetus in 1845. He also helped to form the Koteria Petersburska, a literary group that opposed Polish liberation and supported the Russian authorities, in 1841. Hołowiński's most famous work as a writer was Pilgrimage to the Holy Land, published between 1842 and 1845; it described his six-month journey in the Holy Land after the Imperial University of Kyiv was closed in 1839.

Hołowiński also wrote literary criticism in the Tygodnik Petersburski under the penname "Żegota Kostrowiec"; this literary criticism was said to help popularize preachers such as Johann Emanuel Veith. He also used said penname to compose prose and poetry that had religious and historical themes, which was compiled into Teka rozmaitości, published in 1844.

=== Coadjutor bishop and archbishop of Mohilev ===
On 3 July 1848, Hołowiński was appointed coadjutor bishop cum iure successionis of the Archdiocese of Mohilev and titular bishop of Carystus by Pope Pius IX. His appointment was approved by the Tsar of Russia on 25 August 1848; he was consecrated on 30 November 1848 at the Church of St. Catherine in Saint Petersburg by Kazimierz Dmochowski.

Hołowiński was appointed archbishop of Mohilev on 16 January 1851, after the death of Kazimierz Dmochowski; he assumed the position on 26 January of the same year. Hołowiński died on 19 October 1855 after a prolonged sickness in Saint Petersburg. He was buried at Vyborg Cemetery (near the Cathedral of the Assumption of the Blessed Virgin Mary in Saint Petersburg) in 1856.
