= Antoni Fijałkowski =

Roman Catholic archbishop (1797 – 1883)

- Archbishop of Mohilev
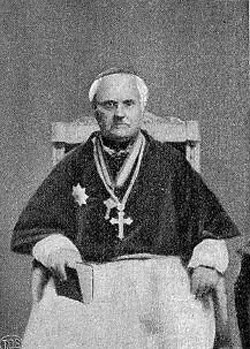
- Appointed: 28 February 1872
- Predecessor: Wacław Żyliński
- Successor: Aleksander Gintowt-Dziewałtowski
- Previous post(s): Bishop of Kamianets-Podilskyi (1860 – 1872); Auxiliary bishop of Kamianets-Podilskyi (1858–1860); Titular bishop of Thennesus (1858 – 1860)

Orders
- Ordination: 31 May 1825
- Consecration: 11 October 1858 by Wacław Żyliński

Personal details
- Born: 13 July 1798
- Died: 11 February 1883 (aged 84); Saint Petersburg

Antoni Fijałkowski (13 July 1798 – 11 February 1883) was a Roman Catholic archbishop of the Archdiocese of Mohilev from 1872 until his death in 1883. He previously served as bishop of the Diocese of Kamianets-Podilskyi from 1860 to 1872, and as auxiliary bishop of the same diocese (and titular bishop of Thennesus) from 1858 to 1860.

== Biography ==
Fijałkowski was born to Antoni and Anna Fijałkowski (née Kłodnicka). After completing gymnasium, he studied at the Akademia Połocka, graduating in 1820 with a magister degree in both laws (canon & civil law), as well as a candidate degree in philosophy. After obtaining this degree, he began attending the seminary in Vilnius on 8 September 1820. After obtaining a magister degree from the seminary, he was ordained a priest on 31 May 1824. He then obtained a doctorate of both laws from the University of Vilnius in 1825, after defending his dissertation De fatis authenticae et exegeseos Apocalipsis. In the same year, he was appointed by Andrzej Kłągiewicz as professor of the diocesan seminary in Vilnius, where he taught dogmatics and French. He was made professor of dogmatic theology and church history at the University of Vilnius on 4 August 1828.

In 1831, Fijałkowski was appointed canon of the cathedral chapter at Vilnius. Afterwards, he worked as a professor of dogmatic theology, moral theology and pastoral theology at the Theological Academy in Vilnius; he was appointed as its rector in 1839, after the resignation of Alojzy Osiński. He held the rectorship until the Academy was transferred to Saint Petersburg, becoming the Saint Petersburg Roman Catholic Theological Academy. He was appointed a prelate of the cathedral chapter of Vilnius on 11 September 1843. He was also appointed vicar capitular of the Diocese of Vilnius on 18 February 1846 and administrator of the Archdiocese of Mohilev on 23 October 1855.

On 27 July 1858, Fijałkowski was appointed auxiliary bishop of the Diocese of Kamianets-Podilskyi and titular bishop of Thennesus. He was consecrated on 11 October of the same year by Wacław Żyliński. He was then appointed bishop of Kamianets-Podilskyi by Pope Pius IX on 11 March 1860. On 11 February 1871, he was appointed by Pope Pius IX as archbishop of Mohilev; his appointment was approved by the Tsar of Russia on 14 April 1872, and he received his pallium on 4 June 1872. He oversaw the formation of a theological seminary in Saint Petersburg, which was opened in 1879 and taught various subjects primarily in Latin, though some courses were taught in Polish and Russian. He died on 11 February [O.S. 30 January] 1883 in Saint Petersburg; his funeral was held at the Church of St. Catherine.
