= Michał Piwnicki =

Roman Catholic bishop (1771 – 1845)

- Bishop of Lutsk-Zytomierz
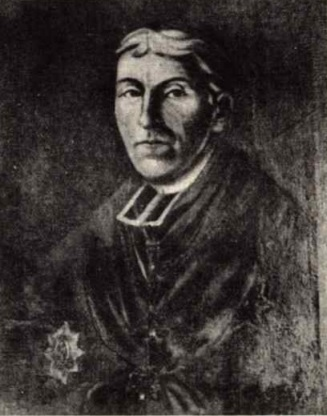
- Installed: 23 June 1828
- Term ended: 29 May 1845
- Predecessor: Kacper Kazimierz Cieciszowski
- Successor: Kacper Borowski
- Previous post(s): Coadjutor bishop of Lutsk-Zytomerz (1827 – 1828); Titular bishop of Rama (1827 – 1828)

Orders
- Ordination: 18 November 1795 by Arseniusz Główniewski
- Consecration: 6 May 1827 by Franciszek Mackiewicz

Personal details
- Born: 1771
- Died: 29 May 1845 (aged 73–74); Zhytomyr

Michał Jan Piwnicki (1771 – 29 May 1845) was a Roman Catholic bishop of the Diocese of Lutsk-Zytomierz from 1828 to his death in 1845. He previously served as coadjutor bishop of the same Diocese and titular bishop of Rama from 1827 to 1828.

== Biography ==
Piwnicki was born in 1771 into a Greek Catholic family; he was baptized on 29 September 1771. After attending secondary school at Volodymyr, he began attending a Greek Catholic seminary in Vilnius, while also attending the University of Vilnius. Between 15 and 18 November 1795, he was ordained into minor orders, the subdiaconate, the diaconate and to the priesthood by Arseniusz Główniewski. He later served as professor of theology at a Uniate seminary at Volodymyr between 1795 and 1797.

In 1797, under the influence of Kacper Kazimierz Cieciszowski, Piwnicki converted to the Latin rite, and was thus incardinated into the Diocese of Kyiv. On 29 December 1797, he was appointed honorary canon of the cathedral chapter of Kyiv by Kacper Kazimierz Cieciszowski. He later served as secretary and chancellor to the bishop at Zytomierz. He was made provost at Maciejowice on 29 August 1798, regular canon of the cathedral chapter at Zytomierz on 7 July 1799, and custodian of the cathedral chapter at Olyka on 26 October 1803.

Piwnicki was made supernumerary canon of the cathedral chapter at Lutsk on 30 November 1804; he was later raised to regular canon on 19 December 1807. On 15 May 1810, he was appointed provost of Ratne. He received a doctorate in theology and both laws from the University of Vilnius on 22 March 1815, following his dissertation De iuridica Ecclesiae potestate. He was appointed assistant judicial vicar of the consistory at Lutsk on 16 January 1816, and was appointed archdeacon on 7 June of the same year.

On 31 May 1825, Piwnicki was appointed coadjutor bishop of the Diocese of Lutsk-Zytomierz by Tsar Alexander I. His appointment was approved by Pope Leo XII on 3 July 1826, who assigned him to the titular see of Rama; he was consecrated on 6 May 1827 at Lutsk by Franciszek Mackiewicz. In the same year, he was appointed head of the Roman Catholic Ecclesiastical College.

He was made bishop of Lutsk-Zytomierz on 23 June 1828, after its previous bishop was made archbishop of Mohilev. He died on 29 May 1845 in Zhytomyr and was buried at Saint Sophia Cathedral in Zhytomyr.
