= Placyd Jankowski =

Polish Orthodox priest & writer (1810 – 1872)

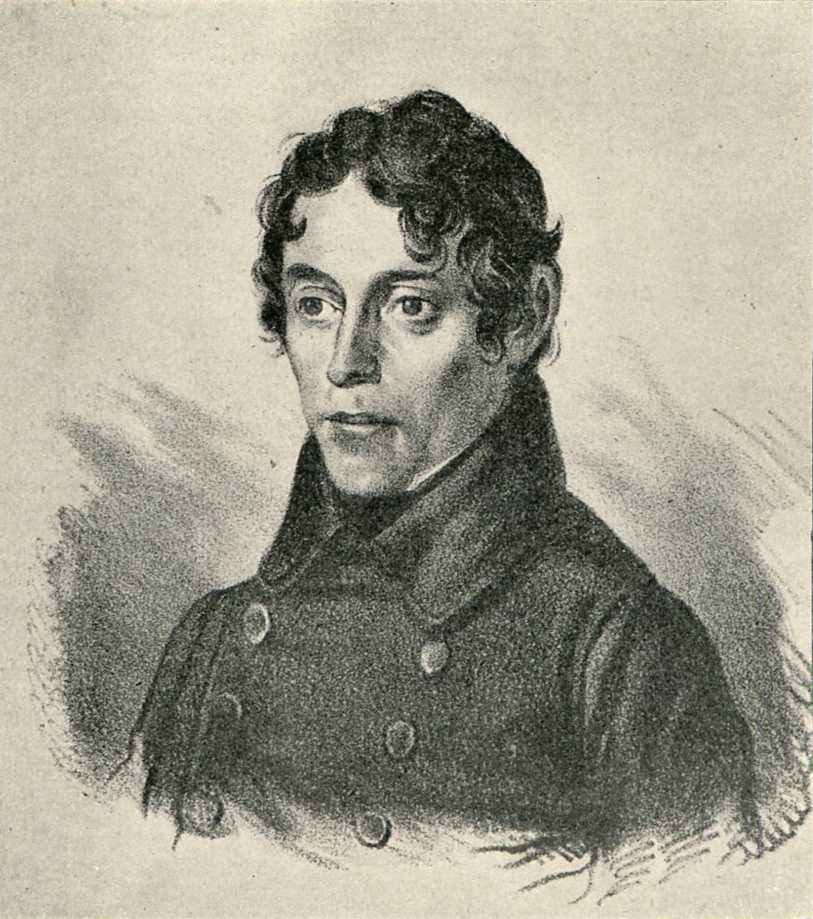
- Born: Eustachy-Placyd Jankowski; 20 September 1810; Voyskaya
- Died: 3 November 1872 (aged 62); Zhyrovichy

Placyd Jankowski (20 September 1810 – 3 November 1872), also known under his pen name John of Dycalp, was a Polish Orthodox priest and writer.

== Biography ==
Jankowski was born in Voyskaya to Gabriel Jankowski, a Uniate canon and archpriest, and Anna Łytkowska; he was part of the Polish Jankowski szlachta family. Until the age of 14, he was educated at a gymnasium in Svislach and a Basilian school in Brest, graduating from the latter in 1824. He was admitted to the seminary at Vilnius University on 28 April 1826, graduating in 1830 with a magister's degree in theology.

After his graduation, he was appointed professor at a Uniate seminary in Zhyrovichy, where he taught scripture, the Latin language and dogmatic theology. His work as a professor was interrupted in 1831 by a cholera epidemic and the November Uprising; he worked as a home tutor in modern-day Belarus until he returned to his academic work in 1832. He sat and passed a doctoral exam at the Roman Catholic Theological Academy in Vilnius in 1831, though his doctoral title was never recognized by Russian authorities.

In 1833, Jankowski was ordained a Uniate priest and married Helena Tupalska. On 16 July 1837, he was made a protopriest. In October 1837, he stated his intention to convert to the Orthodox Church, for which he was considered a traitor in certain circles. After his conversion, he was made an archpriest and was given a golden pectoral cross on 14 May 1838. The following year, in 1839, Jankowski signed the act that liquidated the Uniate Church; Józef Orda recounted in a 1926 letter written to Xawery Pusłowski that Jankowski eventually regretted his involvement in the Church's dissolution. Afterwards, Jankowski was appointed vice-president of the Lithuanian consistory on 15 July 1840. Later, on 10 February 1842, he was awarded the Order of Saint Anna, second and third degrees.

Jankowski was appointed rector of the Orthodox Church of St. Nicholas in Vilnius after he moved to the city in 1845. In 1858, Jankowski retired and moved to Zhyrovichy. After the death of his son and wife in 1867, Jankowski began living a secluded life; he barely interacted with society except for Easter and Christmas — when local authorities and citizens made a "pilgrimage" to offer him wishes — and rarely attended church. He died on 11 March 1872 in Zhyrovichy.

=== Writing career ===
Jankowski published his first book, Chaos, in 1835 under the pen name Witalis Komu-Jedzie. Six years later, in 1841, he published Pisma przed‑ślubne i przed‑splinowe under the pen name John of Dycalp, which was inspired from his surname and his first name written backwards. After Ignacy Hołowiński had quit his project of translating William Shakespeare's works into Polish, he entrusted it to Jankowski, who would eventually publish four translations of Shakespeare: those of The Merry Wives of Windsor in 1842, Twelfth Night in 1845, and Henry IV, Part 1 & Henry IV, Part 2 in 1847. Of these, the latter two were published as the third volume of Hołowiński's translation work.

In total, Jankowski published 26 works in the 1840s and 1850s; he also wrote articles in local newspapers, including the Kurier Litewski and Vilensky Vitesnik. After his retirement in 1858, Jankowski stopped publishing books. He briefly returned to journalism in the wake of the January Uprising, writing for the Tygodnik Peterburski.
