= Kacper Kazimierz Cieciszowski =

Roman Catholic archbishop (1745 – 1831)

- Archbishop of Mohilev
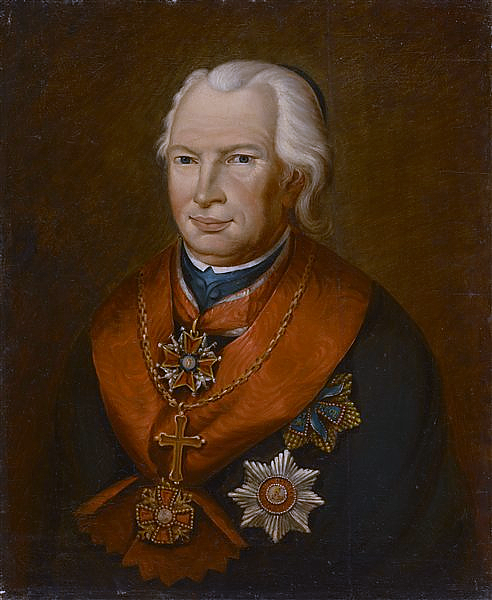
- Appointed: 23 June 1828
- Predecessor: Stanisław Bohusz Siestrzeńcewicz
- Successor: Ignacy Ludwik Pawłowski
- Previous post(s): Bishop of Lutsk-Zhytomyr (1798 – 1828); Bishop of Kijów-Czernihów (1784 – 1798); Coadjutor bishop of Kijów-Czernihów (1775 – 1784); Titular bishop of Theveste (1775–1784)

Orders
- Ordination: 11 March 1769
- Consecration: 8 October 1775 by Andrzej Młodziejowski

Personal details
- Born: 5 January 1745; Ozorów
- Died: 28 April 1831 (aged 86); Lutsk

Kacper Kazimierz Ciecikowski (5 January 1745 – 28 April 1831) was a Roman Catholic archbishop of the Archdiocese of Mohilev from 1828 until his death in 1831. He previously served as bishop of the Diocese of Lutsk-Zhytomyr from 1798 to 1828 and as bishop of the Diocese of Kijów-Czernihów from 1784 to 1798.

== Biography ==
=== Early life & coadjutor bishop of Kijów-Czernihów ===
Cieciszowski was born in Ozorów to Dominik Cieciszowski, the deputy cup-bearer of Lviv, and Marcjanna Suffczyńska; he was baptized on 12 January 1745 at Wodynie. In 1760, he began attending the Pontificio Collegio Urbano de Propaganda Fide in Rome, where he was tonsured and was ordained to minor orders on 18 December 1762. He was ordained to the subdiaconate on 17 December 1768, the diaconate on 18 February 1769 and finally to the priesthood on 11 March 1769. (Note: The person that ordained Ciecszowski is disputed – while Sznarbachowski (1926) claimed that Cieciszowski was ordained by Pope Clement XIII, Prokop (2001) argued that this could not be the case, as Pope Clement had died on 2 February of the same year.)

On 12 December 1768, Ciecizowski was appointed a canon of the cathedral chapter of the Diocese of Warsaw. He returned from Rome to Poland in 1769 and, in 1770, was appointed parish priest at Zbuczyn. Cieciszowski was appointed coadjutor bishop of the Diocese of Kijów-Czernihów by Stanisław August Poniatowski on 13 March 1775. He was preconized as coadjutor bishop of Kijów-Czernihów and titular bishop of Theveste by Pope Pius VI on 29 June of the same year. He was consecrated at St. John's Archcathedral in Warsaw on 8 October 1775 by Andrzej Młodziejowski. His co-consecrators were Antoni Onufry Okęcki and Gabriel Wodzyński.

In 1780, Cieciszkowski was appointed vicarius in spiritualibus for Warsaw and Masovia. He was appointed vicar of the Church of the Holy Sepulchre in Miechów on 22 March 1781 and was awarded the Order of Saint Stanislaus the following year.

=== Bishop of Kijów-Czernihów and senator ===
After the death of Franciszek Kandyd Ossoliński on 7 August 1784, Cieciszowski became bishop of the Diocese of Kijów-Czernihów. He assumed canonical control of the Diocese on 8 October 1784 and ceremonially assumed control at Saint Sophia Cathedral in Zhytomyr on 16 July 1785. As its bishop, Cieciszkowski opened a seminary at Zhytomyr in 1785. He also helped his diocese's parishioners during crop failures between 1785 and 1787 and during a plague outbreak in Lutsk, leading to him being referred to as the "second Francis de Sales" for his virtue.

While serving as bishop of Kijów-Czernihów, Cieciszowski took the senatorial oath of the General Sejm on 5 December 1784. He was awarded the Order of the White Eagle in 1786. He also participated in the Great Sejm, where he represented the interests of the Catholic Church. During the Great Sejm, he proposed a resolution to construct 24 parishes in Kiev and Bratslav, with 3,000 złoty being allocated for each parish's construction. This resolution was brought before the Sejm on 26 April 1792 and was passed. Cieciszowski also served as president of the Zhytomyr civil-military commission in 1791.

After the second partition of Poland, Cieciszowski swore allegiance to the Russian government. In 1796, he was appointed bishop of Pinsk — his jurisdiction comprised parts of the Diocese of Kijów-Czernihów that were now under Russian rule, as well as portions of other dioceses that had not fallen under the control of Stanisław Bohusz Siestrzeńcewicz. He was awarded the Order of Saint Alexander Nevsky after the coronation of Emperor Paul I.

=== Bishop of Lutsk-Zhytomyr and archbishop of Mohilev ===
On 7 August 1798, Cieciszowski was appointed bishop of the Diocese of Lutsk-Zhytomyr, after the two dioceses were united aeque principaliter by the papal bull Ad maiorem fidei catholicae. He assumed ceremonial control of the diocese on 26 September 1798. He served as apostolic administrator of the Diocese of Vilnius between 1827 and 1828.

On 12 March [O.S. 28 February] 1827, Cieciszowski was appointed archbishop of the Archdiocese of Mohilev, president of the Roman Catholic Ecclesiastical College in St. Petersburg, and deputy of the Senate. Furthermore, he was awarded the Order of St. Andrew on 25 April 1828. His appointment as archbishop of Mohilev was recognized by Pope Leo XII on 23 June of the same year; thus, he received his pallium on 6 December. Cieciszowski died on 26 April 1831 in Lutsk; he was buried at Saint Peter and Paul Cathedral in Lutsk.
