= St. John the Baptist Church, Saint Petersburg =

Coordinates: 59.7230°N 30.3994°E

St. John the Baptist Church
- Церковь Иоанна Крестителя
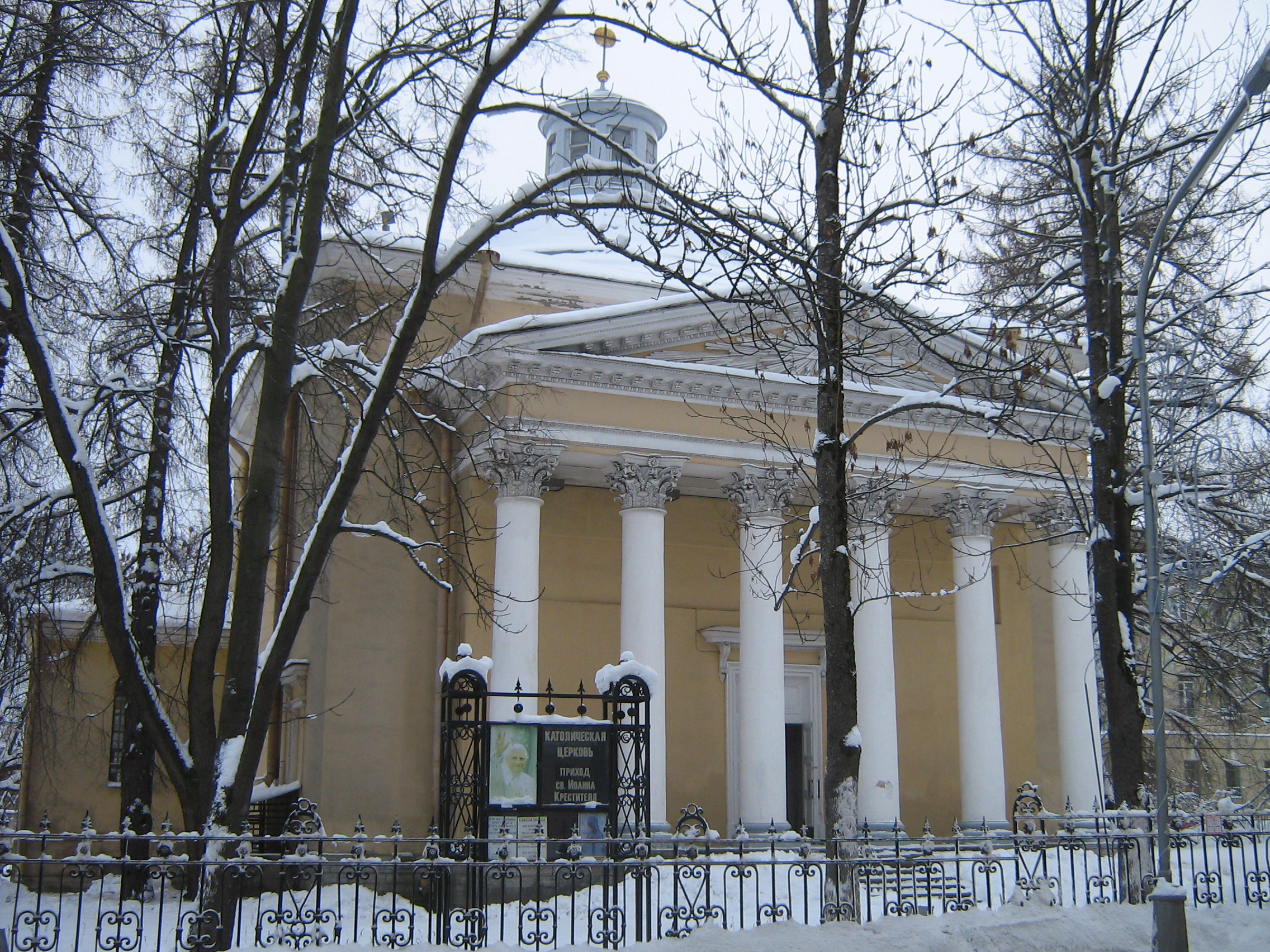
- St. John the Baptist Church
- Location: Saint Petersburg
- Country: Russia
- Denomination: Roman Catholic Church

St. John the Baptist Church (Russian: Церковь Иоанна Крестителя) is a Catholic church located in Pushkin, administratively part of the federal city of Saint Petersburg, Russia. It is part of the Roman Catholic Archdiocese of Moscow, in its northwestern deanery.

The first Catholic church in the imperial residence at Tsarskoye Selo was built in 1811, on the property of the master of ceremonies of the court (Ceremoniemeister), Commander Mezonyaev; but the church was not sufficient for the needs of the community. Emperor Alexander I authorized the construction of a new church on land he donated for the purpose to the Archdiocese of Mohilev. It was built in the neoclassical style between 1823 and 1825 by Leone and Domenico Adamini, with the assistance of Vasily Stasov. The foundation stone was blessed on 6 July [O.S. 24 June] 1825, the Nativity of Saint John the Baptist, in the presence of the Minister of Education. The church was consecrated by the Bishop of Minsk, Matvey Lipsky, on 4 December [O.S. 21 November] 1826.

The church was closed in April 1938 and became a gym. Those buried in the crypt were reburied in the cemetery of Our Lady of Kazan in Pushkin.

The church was damaged during the German occupation of the city during the siege of Leningrad. The first Catholic ceremony was held on 17 March 1991, in the presence of seven Catholic parishioners. The Mass was held the following Sunday. On 1 October 1997, the church was officially returned to the Catholic parish of the city, with an agreement with the directorate of the Tsarskoye Selo State Museum of Fine Arts on the joint use of the building.

Today the church is served by two Spanish priests.

== See also ==
- Roman Catholicism in Russia

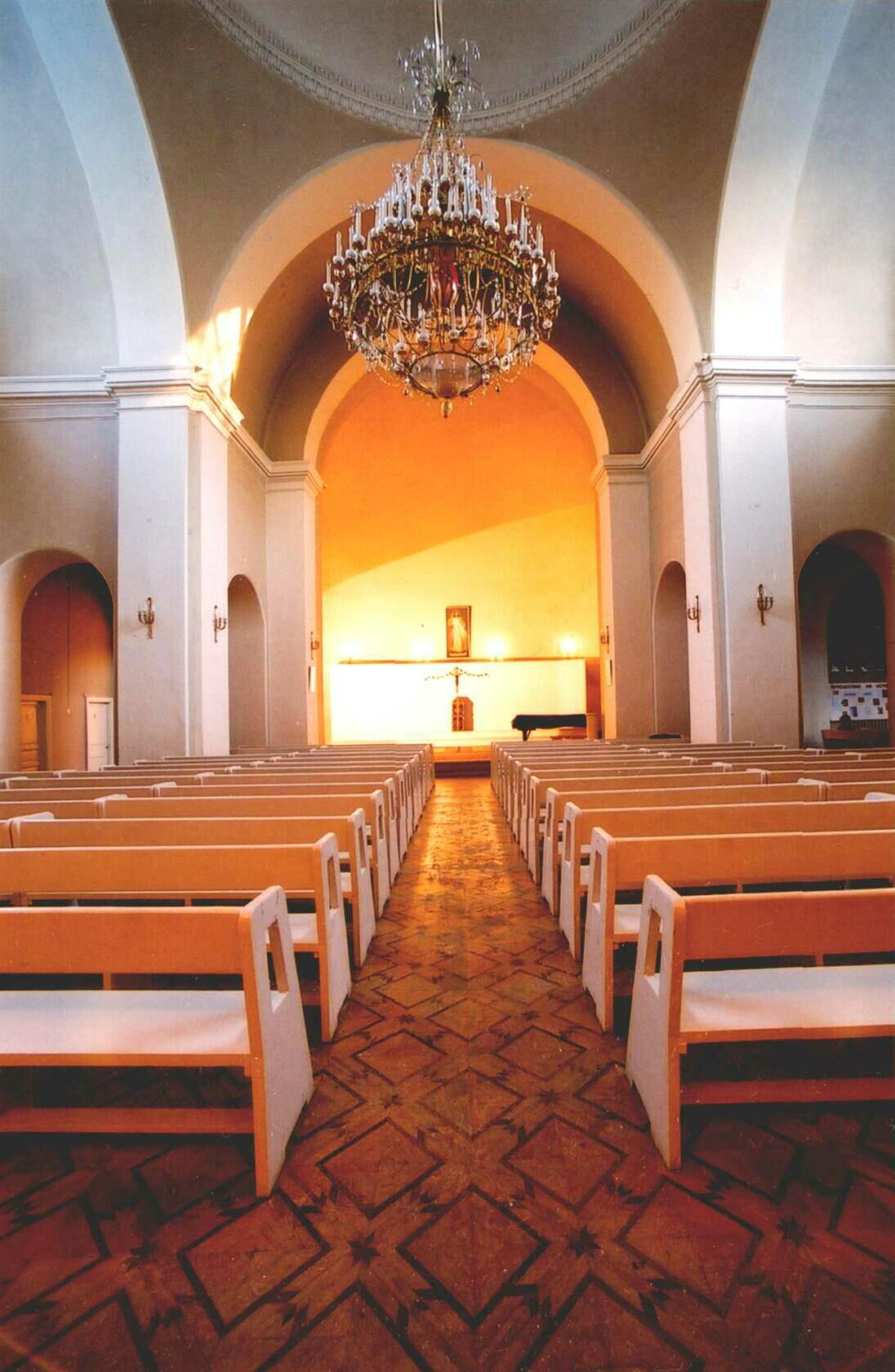
The interior, 2002
