= Franciszek Mackiewicz =

Polish Roman Catholic bishop (1765 – 1842)

- Bishop of Kamianets-Podilskyi

Orders
- Ordination: 6 January 1789 by Jan Chryzostom Kaczkowski
- Consecration: 8 April 1817 by Kacper Kazimierz Cieciszowski

Personal details
- Born: 1765 Lubartów
- Died: 15 January 1842 (aged 76–77) Kamianets-Podilskyi

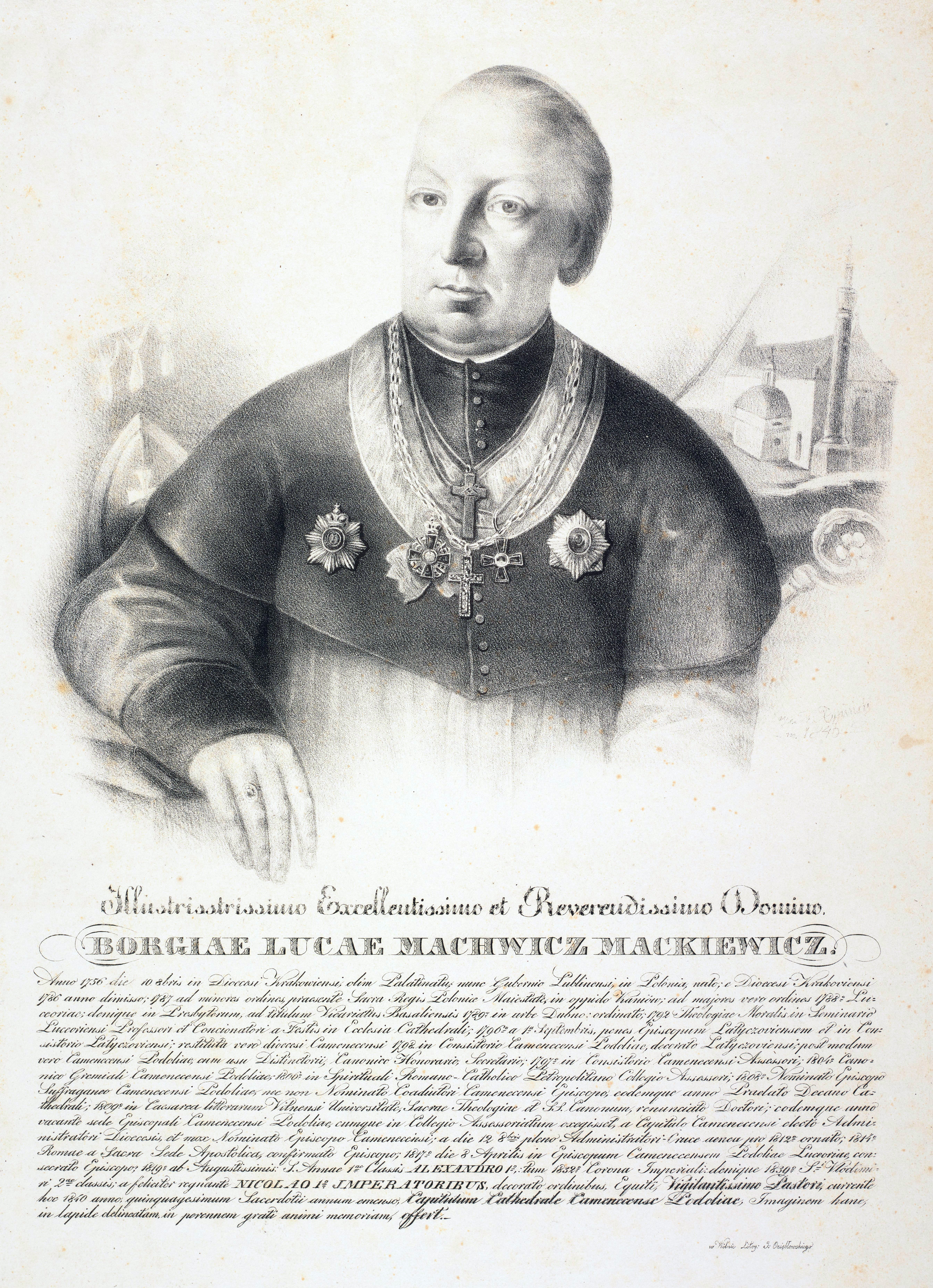
Franciszek Borgiasz Łukasz Mackiewicz.

Franciszek Borgiasz Łukasz Mackiewicz (1765 – 15 January 1842) was a Polish Catholic bishop of the Diocese of Kamianets-Podilskyi from 1817 to his death in 1842.

== Biography ==
Mackiewicz was born in the parish of Lubartów to members of the szlachta. He attended seminary at Zhytomyr. He was ordained to minor orders and tonsured on 5 April 1787 by Adam Naruszewicz at Kaniv. He was ordained to the subdiaconate on 14 December 1788 at Saint Peter and Paul Cathedral in Lutsk by Jan Chryzostom Kaczkowski, being assigned as vicar. He was ordained to the diaconate on 21 December 1788 and to the priesthood on 6 January 1789 at the parish church at Dubno by Jan Chryzostom Kaczkowski.

After his ordination, Mackiewicz served as a secretary to Michał Sierakowski until the latter's death in 1802. In 1808, he was designated as a coadjutor bishop by Jan Dembowski — however, this nomination was rejected by the archbishop of Mohilev, Kacper Kazimierz Cieciszowski, who supported another candidate. A year later, in 1809, he was appointed honorary canon of the cathedral chapter of the Diocese of Kamianets-Podilskyi, and soon after was made its dean. On 13 July of the same year, he received a doctorate in theology and canon law from Vilnius University.

After the death of Jan Dembowski, Mackiewicz was elected vicar capitular for the Diocese of Kamianets-Podilskyi on 12 October 1809. As vicar capitular (and administrator for the Diocese), he also assumed control of the district of Tarnopol, and took back control of the chapter houses in Kamianets-Podilskyi, which at the time were controlled privately. He also assumed control over the Catholics in Bessarabia in 1814. On 15 March 1815, he was appointed by Pope Pius VII as bishop of Kamienets-Podilskyi; he was consecrated on 8 April 1817 at Saint Peter and Paul Cathedral by Kacper Kazimierz Cieciszowski.

As bishop of Kamienets-Podilskyi, Mackiewicz renovated Saint Peter and Paul Cathedral, as well as his episcopal residence, with money he obtained from estates at Pidlisnyi Mukariv, which he had received from Russian authorities. He also invited missionaries into the Diocese, entrusting them with care of the Diocese's seminary. Mackiewicz died on 15 January 1842 at Kamienets-Podilskyi, and was buried at in Saint Peter and Paul Cathedral.
