= Hieronim Stroynowski =

Polish bishop and economist (1752–1815)

- Bishop of Vilnius
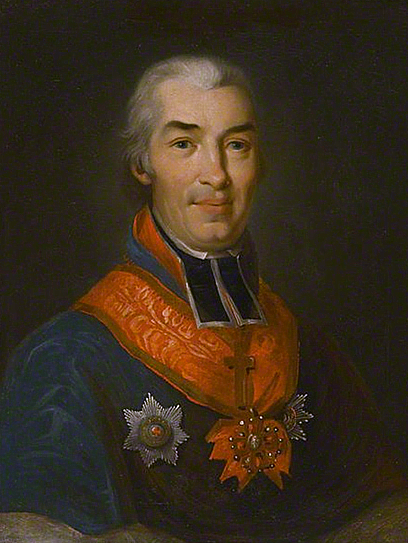
- Portrait by Franciszek Smuglewicz
- Church: Catholic Church
- Diocese: Diocese of Vilnius
- In office: 26 September 1814 – 17 August 1815
- Predecessor: Jan Nepomucen Kossakowski
- Successor: Andrius Benediktas Klongevičius
- Previous posts: Titular Bishop of Lambaesis (1804-1814); Coadjutor Bishop of Lutsk and Zhytomyr (1804-1814)

Orders
- Ordination: 6 April 1776
- Consecration: 19 January 1808 by Kacper Kazimierz Cieciszowski

Personal details
- Born: 20 September 1752 Chodaczków Wielki, Crown of the Kingdom of Poland, Polish–Lithuanian Commonwealth
- Died: 5 August 1815 (aged 62) Vilnius, Vilna Governorate, Northwestern Krai, Russian Empire

Hieronim Stroynowski (20 September 1752 – 5 August 1815) was a Polish bishop and economist. He was the rector of Vilnius University from 1799 to 1806, the administrator of the Diocese of Vilnius from 1808 to 1814, and the Bishop of Vilnius from 1814 until his death in 1815. His writings on economics contributed to Polish liberalism.

== Biography ==
Stroynowski began study with the Piarists in 1760 and took his vows in 1768. He taught at the Collegium Nobilium in Warsaw between 1774 and 1778 before moving to Vilnius to teach at Vilnius University, where he would become a Freemason and continue to teach until 1809. In 1782, he received his doctorate in theology from Jagiellonian University. Between 1787 and 1788 he took a sabbatical in Italy. He became the rector of Vilnius University in 1799 until resigning in 1806.

== Economic ideas ==
Stroynowski wrote a handbook of political and economic studies for the Commission of National Education which would help establish Polish liberalism and physiocracy in Poland. It advocated personal freedom, private property, the sanctity of contract, and free trade. He considered property rights to be the foundation of politics and morality. He also advocated natural law, which he defined as "a collection of foremost and immutable principles, or innate laws, according to which all humanity, everywhere and always, should conform".

== Notable works ==
- Nauka prawa przyrodzonego, politycznego, ekonomiki i prawa narodów (The Study of Natural and Political Law, Economics and the Law of Nations, 1785)
