= Svislach =

Town in Grodno Region, Belarus

Svislach Свіслач
- Town
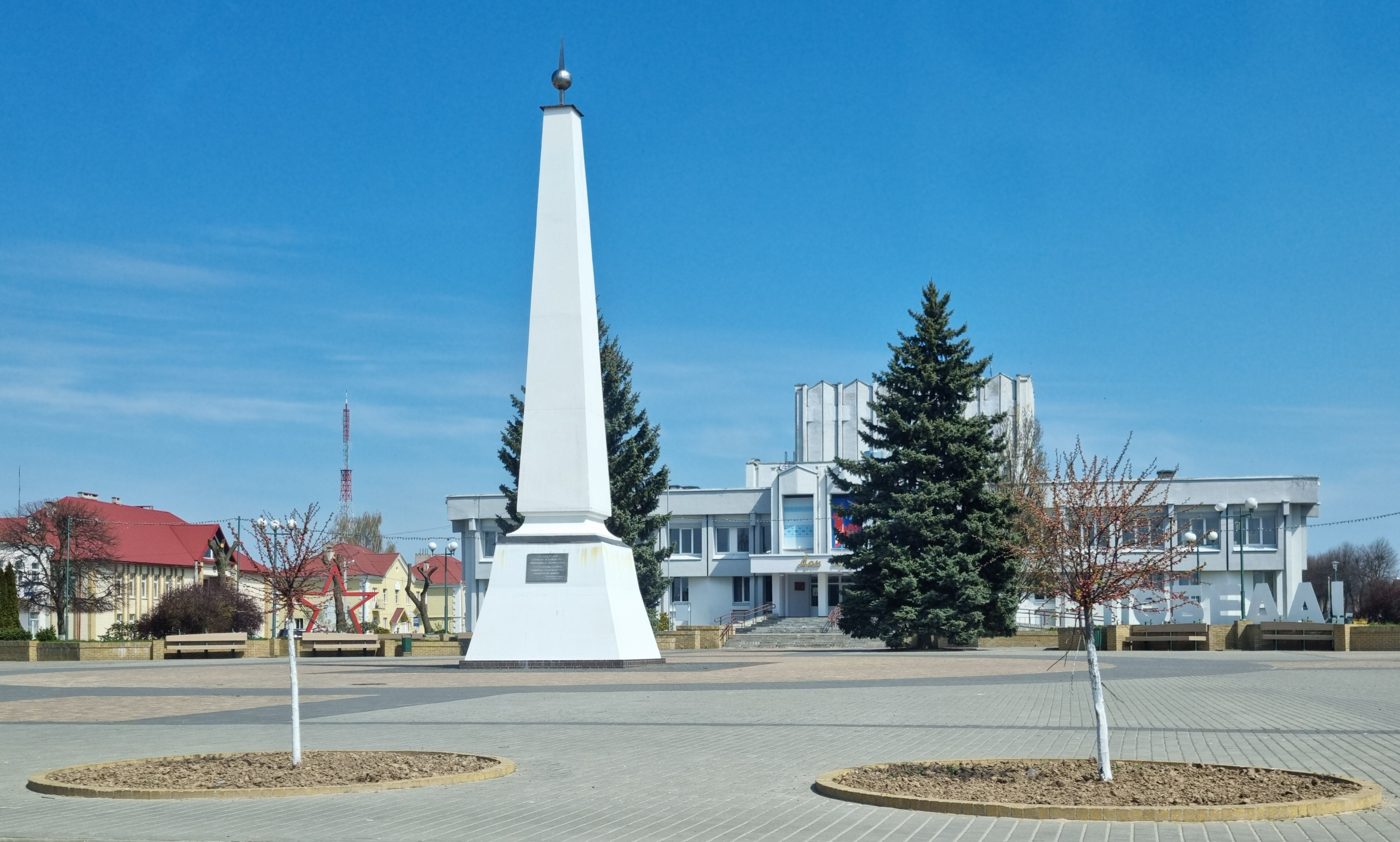

- Flag Coat of arms

- Location within Belarus
- Coordinates: 53°02′N 24°06′E
- Country: Belarus
- Region: Grodno Region
- District: Svislach District
- First mentioned: 1256

Area
  - Total: 4.28 km^{2} (1.65 sq mi)

Population (2025)
  - Total: 5,851
- Time zone: UTC+3 (MSK)
- Postal code: 231960-231969
- Area code: +375 1513
- License plate: 4

Svislach (Belarusian: Сві́слач, romanized: Svislač; Russian: Сви́слочь; Polish: Świsłocz; Yiddish: סיסלעוויטש) is a town in Grodno Region, Belarus. It serves as the administrative center of Svislach District. It is connected with the town Vawkavysk by a railroad branch and with Grodno city by a highway. As of 2025, it has a population of 5,851.

== History ==
Within the Grand Duchy of Lithuania, Svislach was part of Nowogródek Voivodeship. In 1795, Svislach was acquired by the Russian Empire in the course of the Third Partition of Poland.

In 1927, Rabbi Chaim Yaakov Mishkinsky, whose wife Chaya was the granddaughter of Rabbi Naftali Hertz Halperin of Bialystok, was appointed the rabbi of Svislach. He led the community until the Nazis entered in November 1942 murdering the entire Jewish community. Prior to the war, Rabbi Mishkinsky sent his sons Yitzchak and Moshe to Israel (Palestine). Rabbi Mishkinsky's great-grandson, Yochanan Chaim Ivry, serves as rabbi of Toras Emes, Staten Island, NY and his great-granddaughter, Batya Yocheved Friedman serves as one of the rebbetzins in Park East Synagogue, NYC

Svislach was part of the Second Polish Republic from 1921 until 1939. In September 1939, Svislach was occupied by the Red Army and, on 14 November 1939, incorporated into the Byelorussian SSR. In 1939, there were around 3,000 Jews living in Svislach, along with refugees from western Poland who had settled there after the invasion of Poland. From 26 June 1941 until 17 July 1944, Svislach was occupied by Nazi Germany and administered as a part of Bezirk Bialystok. In July 1941, a ghetto was established in the old Jewish neighbourhood, in the northwest of Svislach. In that area, Jews were also gathered from the village of Golobudy. It was an open ghetto, and the western border of the ghetto's territory ran near the Svislach River. On November 2, 1942, the ghetto was liquidated when the Jews were sent by train to the Vawkavysk transit camp where many massacres occurred. The remaining Jews, mostly elderly and sick, were killed in the Visnik Forest, just outside Svislach.

== Notable people ==
- Aharon Kotler (1892–1962), rabbi
- Samuel Belkin (1911–1976), rabbi
- David Lewis (Losz) (1909–1981), Canadian lawyer and federal New Democratic Party leader
