= Svislach district =

District of Grodno region, Belarus

Svislach district Свіслацкі раён (Belarusian) Свислочский район (Russian)
- District
- Flag Coat of arms

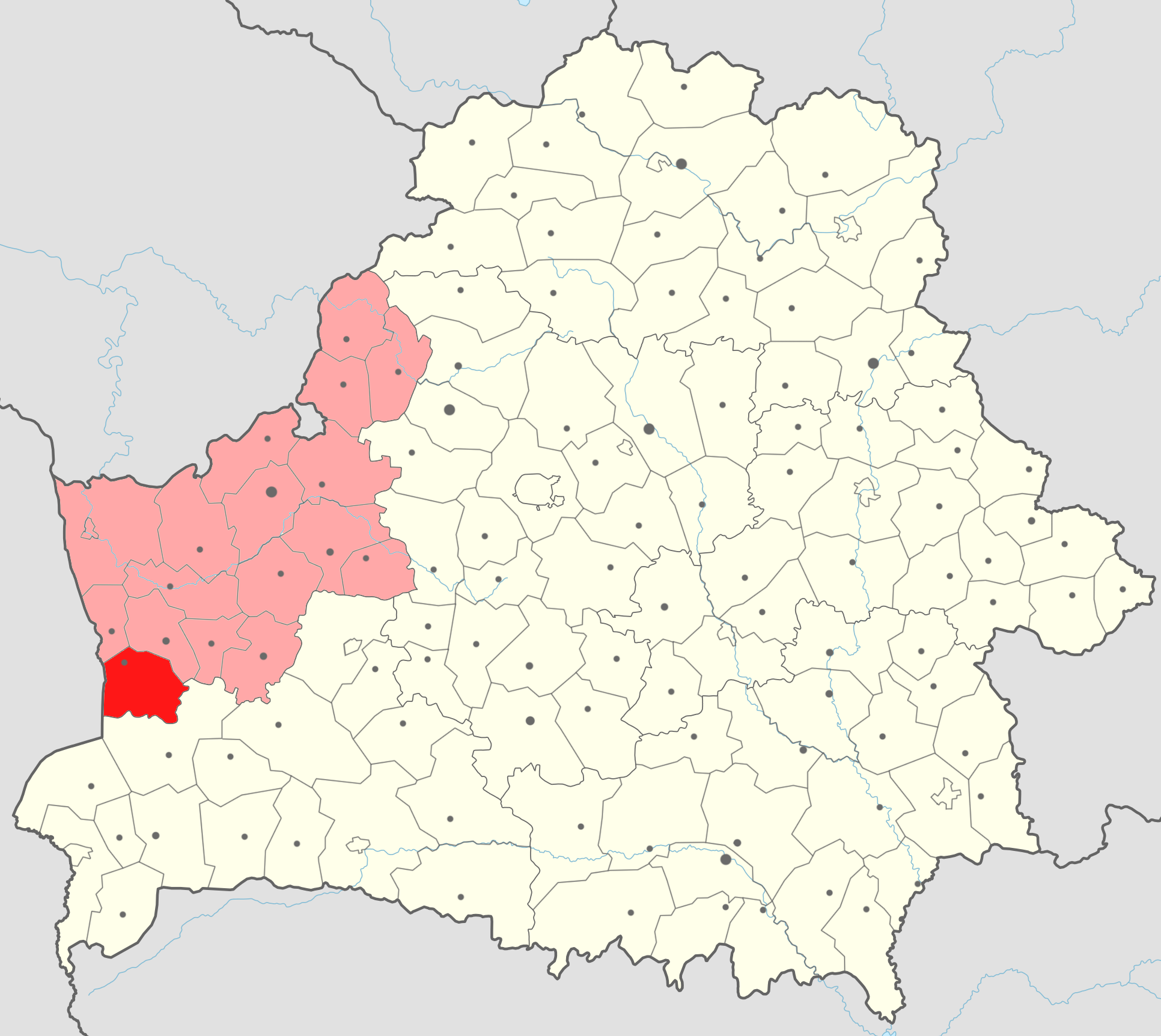
- Coordinates: 53°02′N 24°06′E
- Country: Belarus
- Region: Grodno region
- Administrative center: Svislach

Area
  - District: 1,449.53 km^{2} (559.67 sq mi)

Population (2024)
  - District: 12,755
  - Density: 8.7994/km^{2} (22.790/sq mi)
  - Urban: 6,661
  - Rural: 6,094
- Time zone: UTC+3 (MSK)

Svislach district or Svislač district (Belarusian: Свіслацкі раён; Russian: Свислочский район) is a district (raion) of Grodno region in Belarus. The administrative center is Svislach. As of 2024, it has a population of 12,755.

== Notable residents ==
- Vincent Hadleŭski (1888, village of Porozowo (now Šuryčy) – 1942), Belarusian Catholic priest, publicist and politician, victim of the Nazi repressions
