= Stanisław Bohusz Siestrzeńcewicz =

18th- and 19th-century Belarusian archbishop

- Archbishop of Mohilev (Mogilev)
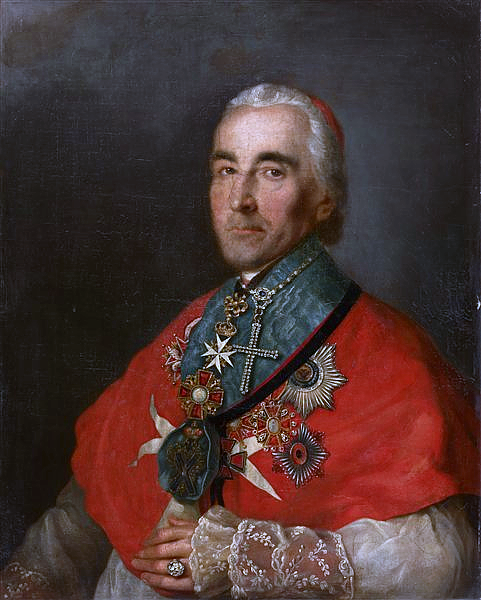
- Portrait by an unknown artist

Orders
- Ordination: 3 July 1763
- Consecration: 3 October 1773

Personal details
- Born: 3 September 1731 Zanki, Svislach District, Belarus
- Died: 1 December 1826 (aged 95) Saint Petersburg

Stanisław Bohusz Siestrzeńcewicz (Belarusian: Станіслаў Богуш-Сестранцэвіч, 1731–1826) was a Polish Catholic clergyman who became the first bishop of the Metropolitan Archdiocese of Mohilev (Mogilev), an Archbishop from 1784 and a prominent member of the Russian Academy (1807), who had earlier converted from Calvinism.

== Biography ==
Stanisław Bohusz Siestrzeńcewicz was born in Zanki, Troki Province (now Svislach District Grodno Region). His father was a Calvinist. and his mother was a Catholic. Stanisław studied at the Slutskaya Calvinist School, and later at the University of Frankfurt. After traveling through Europe, he visited Amsterdam and London, and served in the Prussian Infantry and the Lithuanian Cavalry. In 1761, he retired with the rank of captain.

He then worked as a tutor for the Radziwiłł family, at which point he converted to Catholicism. In 1762, Siestrzeńcewicz developed a course of theology in Warsaw.

In 1763, he received holy orders. He served as rector in Gomel and Bobruisk and later, a canon in Vilnius. On 2 July 1773, he was appointed Titular Bishop of Mallus. On 3 October 1773, Monsignor Gyultsen, representing the Bishop of Smolensk, officially consecrated him as a bishop. After that, he was appointed Auxiliary Bishop of the Diocese of Vilnius, for the territory that was ceded to Russia. In early December 1773, Catherine II announced the creation of a Belarusian Catholic diocese with headquarters in Mogilev and Siestrzeńcewicz's appointment as Belarusian bishop.

The newly appointed bishop oversaw all Latin Church Catholics in Russia (including Moscow and Saint Petersburg). In 1774, Siestrzeńcewicz brought a printing press to Mohilev in order to publish spiritual and secular literature. On 14 February 1782, Catherine II transformed the diocese to the Belarusian Archdiocese of Mohilev and Siestrzeńcewicz became Archbishop. He took office after a ceremony on 20 February 1782. From this year until the end of the century, he lived in Mohilev.

His appointment was made without the consent of Pope Pius VI, and in 1783 an extraordinary ambassador of the Holy See, Giovanni Andrea Archetti, was sent to Saint Petersburg settle the conflict. Following the talks, in exchange for certain concessions, the pope approved Siestrzeńcewicz's nomination and the post of archbishop and handed him the pallium on 22 February 1784.

In 1783, he founded the theater in Mohilev. From 1798 to 1800, he chaired the collegium of the Catholic Justice Department. From 1801 to 1810 he was Chairman of the Catholic Theological Board. He died in on December 1, 1826 at the age of 95 and was buried in St. Stanislaus Church, Saint Petersburg.

Casper Casimir Kolumna Cieciszewski succeeded him as Archbishop of Mohilev.

== Honours ==
Order of the Russian Empire

- Order of St. Andrew
- Order of St. Alexander Nevsky
- Order of St. Vladimir, 1st degree
- Order of St. Anna, 1st degree
- Russian tradition of the Knights Hospitaller (1798)

Order of the Polish-Lithuanian Commonwealth

- Order of the White Eagle (Poland)
- Order of Saint Stanislaus

== Works ==
- Ustawy cesarzowej Katarzyny na gubernije (Mogilev, 1777)
- Gocya W Taurydzie, tragedyja wierszem polskim (Mogilev, 1783)
- On Western Russia (in Polish ) (1793)
- Diarium congregationis Synodalis utriusque Cleri Romani Catolici in Imperio Rossico (Mogilev, 1794)
- History Tavrii (1800)
- On the origin of the Slavs, and Sarmatians (1812)

== Sources ==
- Amara M. Buan-Ambassador of His Holiness. St. Petersburg, The verb, 1996, ISBN 5-85381-123-1.
- Nadtoka GM Roman Catholicism in Ukraine at the end of XVIII — early XXI century: church-state, inter-denominational and ethnic aspects - Gilea: Research Journal of Scientific Papers — Issue 65 (2012).
- Lyudmila Novikova Crimean factor in the history of the Cossacks in the image historians of the first half of the nineteenth century. - Black Sea past. Memoirs of the history of the Cossacks in the south of Ukraine Scientific Research Institute of the Cossacks of the Institute of History of Ukraine: Proc. Science. etc. - Vyp.5. - A.: SAP Brovkin OV-2010. - 180 c.
- Piotr Nitecki, The Bishops of the Church in Poland in the years 965-1999. Biographical Dictionary, Oxford University Press "Pax", Warsaw 2000.
- Christopher R. Prokop Suksceja ordination and episcopal ordination of Pastors Vilnius with the second and third period of the eighteenth century, the Catholic Theological Yearbook Vol V, Bialystok 2006, ISSN 1644-8855, pp. 240.
- Hierarchy of Catholica medii et recentioris Aevi, Volume VI, Patavii 1958, p 274 (Latin).
- Prokop, 2006, p 224.
- Geographical Dictionary of the Kingdom of Poland and other Slavic countries, Volume XIV (Worowo — Żyżyn) of 1895.
- Hierarchy medii Catholica et recentioris Aevi, Volume VI, Patavii 1958, p 293 (Latin).
- Paul Czerwinski, The Order of Malta and its relations with the Polish over the centuries, p 163.
- Zbigniew Dunin-Wilczynski, Order of Saint Stanislaus, Warszawa 2006, p 181.
- Knights and the statutes of the Order of the White Eagle, 1705–2008, 2008, p 222.
- Ivanovsky, Eustace, Rozmowy o polskiéj koronie, Kraków 1873, on page 677 Siestrzeńcewicz a philosopher and a broken spirit; Protestant brash, immoral man, the enemy of the Church, has been completely removed.
- Kochanowski, Gennady, Bogush-Sestrentsevich Stanislav Ivanovich Encyclopedia of History of Belarus. At 6 vols 2 Belitskaya — Anthem / Belarusian. Encyclopedia.; Editorial Board.: BI Sachenko (ed.). Etc..; Sett. EE Zhakevich. - Mn.: BelEn, 1994. S. 52.
- 13 сьнежня 1919 году Пётра Крэчэўскі стаў старшынём Рады БНР, Radio Free Europe / Radio Liberty, 13 December 2005.
- Kochanowski, Archaeologists and local history of Belarus in the 16th-19th centuries. - Mn., 1984. - S. 11–22.
- Philippovich I. Myths and truths about Mogilev. - Mogilev, 1993. - S. 77–79.
- Encyclopedia. At 6 vols 2 Belitskaya — Anthem / Belarusian. Encyclopedia.; Editorial Board.: BI Sachenko (ed.). Etc..; Sett. EE Zhakevich. - Mn.: BelEn, 1994. - 537 p., [8] k: ill. ISBN 5-85700-142-0.
- Jackiewicz S. Stanislav Bogush-Sestrentsevich / "Bulletin of Mogilev," 11 December 1992.
