= Archdiocese of Vilnius =

Latin Catholic archdiocese in Lithuania

Archdiocese of Vilnius Archidioecesis Vilnensis Vilniaus Arkivyskupija
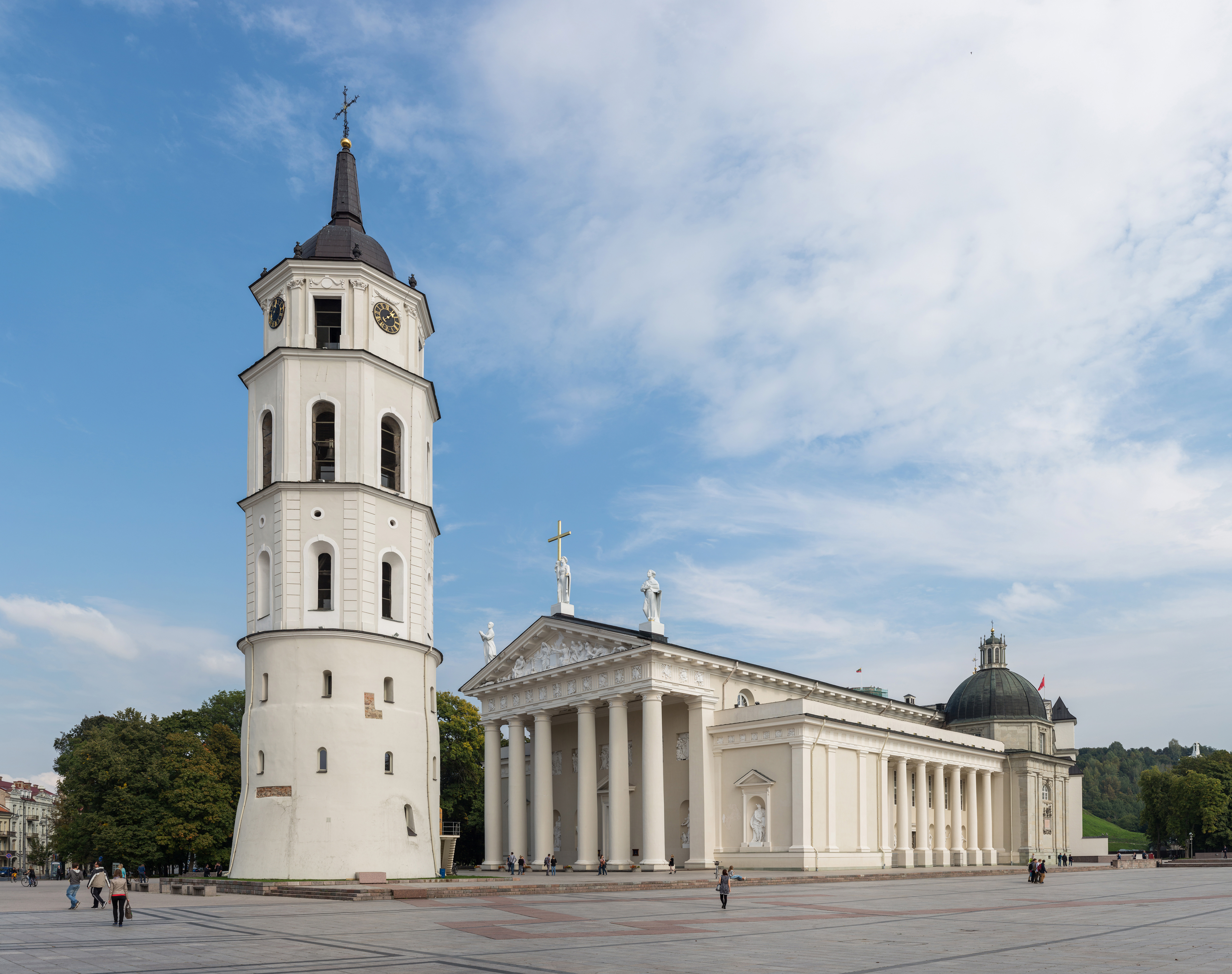
- Cathedral of the Archdiocese

Location
- Country: Lithuania
- Territory: Vilnius
- Ecclesiastical province: Vilnius
- Coordinates: 54°54′N 23°57′E

Statistics
- Area: 9,644 km^{2} (3,724 sq mi)
- Population: Total; Catholics: (as of 2017); 827,141; 605,108 (73.2%)
- Parishes: 95

Information
- Denomination: Catholic
- Sui iuris church: Latin Church
- Rite: Roman Rite
- Established: 14th Century (As Diocese of Vilnius); 28 October 1925 (As Archdiocese of Vilnius)
- Cathedral: Cathedral-Basilica of St. Stanislaus and St. Ladislaus
- Patron saint: St Casimir, St George, St Nicholas, Bruno of Querfurt
- Secular priests: 171

Current leadership
- Pope: Leo XIV
- Metropolitan Archbishop: Gintaras Grušas
- Suffragans: Diocese of Kaišiadorys; Diocese of Panevėžys
- Auxiliary Bishops: Arūnas Poniškaitis
- Bishops emeritus: Cardinal Audrys Bačkis

Map
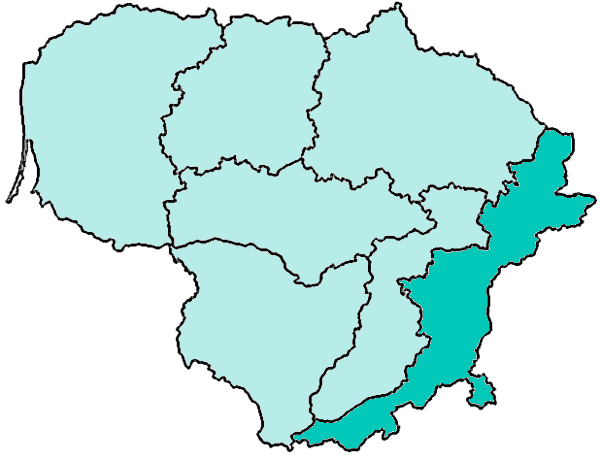

Website
- vilnius.lcn.lt

The Metropolitan Archdiocese of Vilnius (Latin: Archidioecesis Vilnensis; Lithuanian: Vilniaus arkivyskupija) is an ecclesiastical territory or diocese of the Catholic Church in Lithuania. Established as the Diocese of Vilnius in the 14th century, it was elevated to the rank of a metropolitan archdiocese by Pope Pius XI on 28 October 1925. It has two suffragan sees of Kaišiadorys and Panevėžys.

The archdiocese's motherchurch and thus seat of its archbishop is Cathedral-Basilica of St. Stanislaus and St. Ladislaus in Vilnius; it also houses a minor basilica in Trakai. The current archbishop of Vilnius is Gintaras Grušas. He is assisted by auxiliary bishops Arūnas Poniškaitis and Darius Trijonis.

== History ==
=== Establishment ===
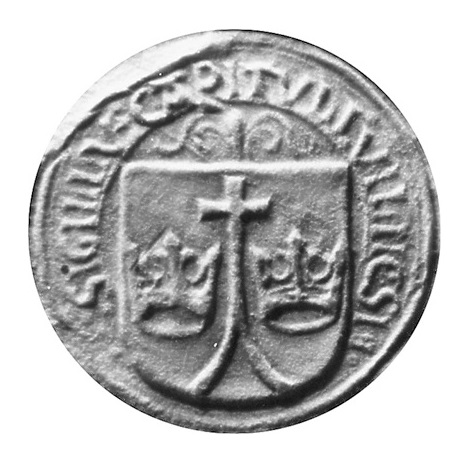
Renaissance coat of arms of the Cathedral chapter of the Diocese of Vilnius

The Archdiocese owes its foundation to Jogaila, who christened Lithuania in 1387. On 17 February 1387, he founded the Diocese of Vilnius, granting it substantial privileges and estates, thereby creating the second-largest landed complex in Lithuania, after that of the Grand Duke. After that he sent Dobrogost, bishop of Poznań as ambassador to the Pope Urban VI with a petition for the erection of an episcopal see at Vilnius and the appointment of Andrzej Jastrzębiec (former bishop of Siret and confessor of Elisabeth of Hungary) to fill it. This was granted on 11 March 1388 and the foundation of a collegiate church of ten canons authorized. The Diocese of Vilnius was placed under the authority of the Gniezno metropolitan see and became part of the Polish ecclesiastical province.

Under Jastrzębiec's rule, the churches of Saint John, that became the parish church of the city, as well as of Saint Martin and Saint Anne (in the Upper and the Lower Castle, respectively) were erected in Vilnius. Upon Jastrzębiec's death in 1398, he was succeeded by a Franciscan, Jakub Plichta (1398–1407), in whose time the Cathedral perished in fire. Among his successors were: Piotr Krakowczyk (1414–1421), whom Pope Martin V invested with full powers to bring back the Orthodox of Lithuania to the Catholic Church; Matthias of Trakai (1421–1453), a Lithuanian, who sent representatives to the Council of Basel and set up the Inquisition to combat the Hussites, founded many churches and strenuously defended the rights and privileges of the Lithuanians. Under Jan Łosowicz (1467–1481) many Ruthenians were converted to Catholicism and the Franciscan Bernardines were established at Vilnius. Albert Tabor, a Lithuanian, invited the Dominicans to Vilnius and entrusted to them the Church of the Holy Spirit; Albert Radziwiłł (1508–1519) died in the odour of sanctity; John the Lithuanian (1519–1537) held the first diocesan synod at Vilnius in 1526; Prince Paweł Holszański (1534–1555) restored his cathedral in the Gothic style and held a synod in 1555; Walerian Protasewicz Suszkowski (1556–1580) had to contend for the celibacy of the clergy and the use of Latin in the Liturgy; he brought the Jesuits, among whom was Piotr Skarga, to Vilnius.

=== Reformation ===
Prince Jerzy Radziwiłł (1581–1591) fostered the Alma Academia et Universitas Vilnensis Societatis Iesu, founded a seminary, under the direction of the Jesuits, introduced the regulations of the Council of Trent, and having been made a cardinal, was transferred to the Diocese of Kraków in 1591. The chapter then entrusted the administration of the diocese to the suffragan bishop, Ciprian. At his death in 1594, the Lithuanian nobles strictly opposed the appointment of Bernard Maciejowski as the Bishop of Vilnius and he was never confirmed as such, while the clergy were also divided into factions on the choice of a successor, until Sigismund III nominated Benedict Wolna (1600–1615), who exerted himself efficaciously for the canonization of Saint Casimir Jagiellon, in whose honour the first stone of a church was laid it Vilnius in 1604. He succeeded in his efforts to have St. Casimir regarded as patron saint of Lithuania. His successor, Eustachius Wollowicz (1616–1630), founded hospitals, invited the Canons Regular of the Lateran to Vilnius, and energetically combated the Protestants and the Orthodox. Abraham Woyna (1631–1649) introduced the Fatebene Brethren and strenuously opposed Calvinism. Jerzy Tyszkiewicz (1650–1656) annexed the whole of Courland to his diocese. Aleksander Sapieha (1666–1671) founded the Church of Saints Peter and Paul, taking St. Peter's for his model. The diocese then comprised 25 deaneries with 410 churches. Constantius Casimir Brzostowski (1687–1722) brought the Piarists to Vilnius and encouraged the development of the religious orders. In the episcopate of Michael Zienkowicz (1730–1762), conflicts between the Jesuits and the Piarists arose, resulting in the closing of Piarist schools. Prince Ignacy Jakub Massalski (1762–1794) encouraged the reform of the clergy and devoted his immense fortune to the churches of his diocese.

=== Under the Russian Empire ===
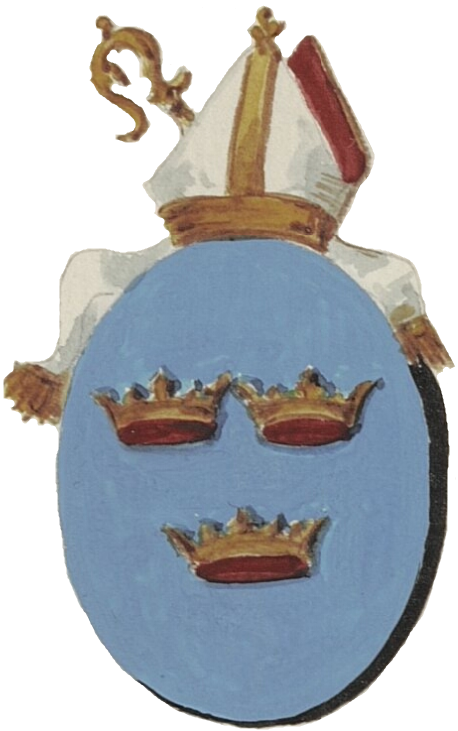
Diocese's coat of arms in 1875

After the partitions of Poland–Lithuania, the Diocese of Vilnius became part of the Russian Empire and no longer enjoyed freedom of relations with the Holy See but many Catholics supported the Russian government after Bishop of Vilnius Ignacy Jakub Massalski was hanged in 1794 by the revolutionaries of the Kościuszko Uprising. In 1795 the chapter nominated David Pilchowski vicar in spiritualibus. Livonia was added to the diocese, and John Nepomucene Kossakowski (1798–1808) was appointed bishop. He did much for the prosperity of the seminary. After his death the chapter became involved in a conflict with Stanisław Bohusz Siestrzeńcewicz, the Catholic Metropolitan Archbishop of Mohilev (from 1798 to 1925 Vilnius was a suffragan see of the Archdiocese of Mohilev, the effective see was in Saint Petersburg), who used his metropolitan rights and forced, upon the chapter, the nominee of Hieronim Stroynowski as administrator and later Bishop (1808–1815), upon whose death he arrogated to himself the government of the diocese with the title of primate of Lithuania.

By ukaze (imperial decree) of Alexander I of Russia on July 18, 1803, the Vilnius Seminary was declared the central seminary of the Empire, with the obligation for the future Russian Catholic "high clergy" (bishops, canons, ecclesiastical judges) to study there and obtain a degree in theology or canon law. An annual endowment of 180,000 rubles funded by the imperial treasury was established for its maintenance. The Vilnius seminary remained the primary center of study for the Catholic clergy until the establishment of the Roman Catholic Theological Academy of Saint Petersburg in 1831, placed under the direct leadership of Archbishop of Mogilev Ignacy Ludwik Pawłowski.

In 1827, after Siestrzencewicz's death, the vicar capitular, Milucki, ruled the diocese for a short time. In 1828 Andreas Klagiewicz was appointed administrator; he was sent to the interior of Russia during the Insurrection of 1831, returned in 1832, was preconized Bishop of Vilnius in 1839 and took possession of the see on June 28, 1841. He died the same year, after witnessing the ruin of the Ruthenian Uniat Church in his diocese. The chapter elected John Cywinski as vicar suffragan; he saw the University of Vilnius closed, the clergy and churches of his diocese despoiled of their property. In 1848 he was succeeded by Wenceslaus Zylinski, who was transferred in 1856 to the metropolitan see of Mohilev, but continued to govern his former diocese until 1858.

Adam Stanislaus Krasinski was expelled from the diocese in consequence of the Insurrection of 1863, but nevertheless continued to govern the diocese until 1883, when he withdrew to Kraków. His successor, Charles Hrynieweki, was exiled to Jaroslav after two years of the episcopate, and in 1890 abdicated and withdrew to Galicia. During his exile Ludovic Zdanowicz governed the diocese as vicar patriarchal. In 1890 Anthony Francis Audziewicz, a canon of Saint Petersburg and a learned theologian, was appointed Bishop of Vilnius. He died in 1895; the diocese was then governed by Louis Zdanowicz, titular Bishop of Dionysias. In 1897 Canon Stephen Alexander Zwerowicz succeeded, and was transferred in 1902 to the See of Sandomir. His place was taken by Baron Edward Ropp, who set about organizing the Catholic movement in the diocese, thereby incurring the hostility of the Russian Government. Bishop Ropp having been banished to Pskov, the diocese was entrusted to Casimir Nicholas Michalkiewicz as administrator Apostolic.

== Other activities ==
The bishops of Vilnius, presiding over a vast diocese and being senators and members of the Council of Lords of Lithuania, could not give all their attention to the spiritual necessities of their flock; hence, from the fifteenth centuries they had coadjutors or auxiliary Bishops. Many of these, particularly in the 16th and 17th centuries, were titular bishops of Methoni, Messenia (on the Peloponnesus). Among the most famous may be mentioned George Casimir Ancuta (d. 1737), author of "Jus plenum religionis catholicae in regno Poloniaw", showing that the Protestants and Orthodox had not the same rights as the Catholics. Beginning from the seventeenth century there were also auxiliary Bishops for Belarus. In 1798 Pius VI recognized the ancient See of Brest-Litovsk as "suffragan" of Vilnius. So also the ancient Diocese of Livonia, suppressed in 1797, had become annexed to Vilnius, and in 1798 had for its first auxiliary bishop Adam Kossiafkowski (titular Bishop of Limira, died 1828) but after 1848 it was annexed to the Diocese of Samogitia (in Lithuania proper).

The flourishing Catholic life of the Diocese of Vilnius is attested by the large number of synods held there. The first of these was in 1502, under Bishop Tabor. Then followed the synods of 1526, for the reform of manners and the organization of the parochial schools; of 1528, to collect funds for the restoration of the cathedral; of 1555, to oppose the spread of Lutheranism; of 1582; of 1607, which made many regulations for the administration of the sacraments and the discipline of the clergy; of 1630, regulating the administration of ecclesiastical property; of 1654, to aid the state with new imposts; of 1669 with its disciplinary regulations; of 1685, with ordinances relating to the administration of the sacraments and the life of the clergy; of 1744, with regulations in regard to the catechism, mixed marriages and spiritual exercises. After the synod of 1744, under Bishop Michael Zienkowicz, no others were held, but the bishops addressed to their clergy pastoral letters, some of them of notable import.

== Churches ==
Franciscan Church, one of the oldest in Vilnius

The diocese possesses splendid churches and venerable sanctuaries. Of the former the largest and most beautiful are in Vilnius, although many, violently wrested from the Catholics, became Russian Orthodox churches. The cathedral, dedicated to the Blessed Trinity, St. Stanislaus and St. Ladislaus, was erected in the place of a demolished pagan sanctuary in virtue of a Papal Bull of 12 March 1387. Burned down in 1399, it was rebuilt in the Gothic style in 1399 by Grand Duke Vytautas; again destroyed in 1531 and 1662, its restoration was begun in 1769 and finished in 1801. It contains splendid chapels, especially those of St. Casimir and of the Immaculate Conception.

Other important churches are those of the Holy Cross, allegedly founded in the fourteenth century on the spot where, according to the legend from the Bychowiec Chronicle, fourteen Franciscans were martyred by the pagans in 1366; the Church of Saint Martin, founded by Jogaila in 1380, built on the ruins of an ancient pagan temple; St. Anne, founded for the Germans by Anna, the consort of Vytautas, in 1392; St. John the Evangelist, founded in 1386 and enriched with privileges by Leo X; Corpus Domini, founded by the Archconfraternity of the Blessed Sacrament in 1573; and the Church of the Guardian Angels.

To these must be added the numerous churches of the religious order, which flourished in Lithuania, but of which few traces remain. The Dominicans, who in the fifteenth century had a church dedicated to the Holy Spirit, built in 1679–1688 another, which in 1844 was given up by them and transformed into a parish church. The Bernardines undertook at Vilnius, in 1469, the construction of a wooden church, rebuilt in stone in 1500; it was burnt down in 1794 and restored in 1900; this order was forced to leave the diocese in 1864. The Church of Saints Peter and Paul was given to the Lateran Canons in 1638; they abandoned it in 1864. St. Casimir, with the annexed Jesuit college, founded in 1604, was turned into an Orthodox church in 1832 (it was returned to the Jesuits in the 1920s). St. Ignatius Loyola, founded by the Jesuits in 1622, became the club of the officials. The Carmelite Church of St. Teresa has a miraculous image of the Madonna. The Augustinians, Trinitarians, Brigittines, Carmelite Sisters, Piarists, Visitandines and others also had churches, to which must be added numerous chapels.

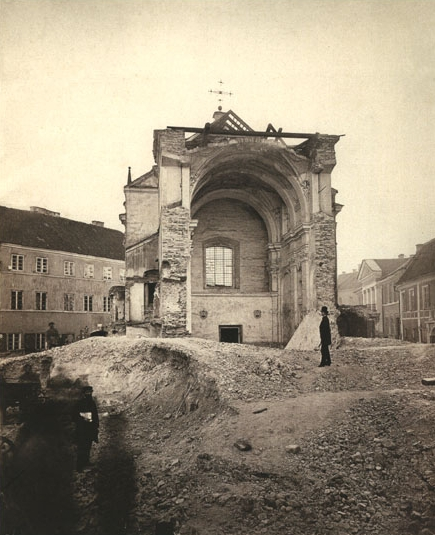
The Church of Saint Joseph being demolished by the order of authorities in Vilnius, 1877

After the Insurrection of 1863, the diocese saw all its religious violently expelled. The monasteries were converted into barracks, the churches given to the Orthodox or the secular clergy, the libraries dispersed, the possessions of the religious confiscated. In 1910 there remained only one monastery of Benedictine Sisters (connected with the Church of St. Catherine at Vilnius) with six septuagenarian nuns, a Bernardine convent at Slonim with four septuagenarian nuns, a Franciscan monastery at Grodno with a single friar and in the same city a convent of Brigittine Sisters with two religious.

On October 28, 1925 the old bishopric, then in Poland, was promoted as Metropolitan Archdiocese, with only two suffragans: the diocese of Łomża and the diocese of Pinsk, until 1991. In 1991–1992 the Polish and Belarusian parts of the old bishopric became separate dioceses, under the new Archdiocese of Białystok and Diocese of Grodno.

== Statistics ==
In the early 20th century the Diocese of Vilnius had 1,420,000 faithful distributed among 23 rural deaneries as follows:

| Deanery | Parishes | Parishioners |
|---|---|---|
| Białystok | 20 | 101,761 |
| Bielsk | 20 | 66,125 |
| Brest | 3 | 14,212 |
| Dzisna | 15 | 66,536 |
| Giedraičiai | 13 | 58,813 |
| Grodno | 20 | 58,116 |
| Kobryn | 2 | 7,925 |
| Lida | 14 | 65,100 |
| Merkinė | 20 | 82,948 |
| Nadwilejski | 8 | 41,053 |
| Ashmyany | 11 | 61,032 |
| Prwjany | 7 | 11,648 |
| Radun | 15 | 83,451 |
| Slonim | 7 | 30,337 |
| Sokółka | 14 | 75,709 |
| Švenčionys | 19 | 93,716 |
| Swir | 11 | 48,266 |
| Trakai | 20 | 88,856 |
| Vilnius (City) | 30 churches and chapels | 141,104 |
| Vilnius (District) | 9 | 52,690 |
| Vilejka | 10 | 35,783 |
| Wisniew | 15 | 83,900 |
| Wolkowysk | 16 | 58,825 |

Besides the cathedral parish the city of Vilnius contains those of St. John Baptist, the Holy Spirit, St Teresa, Saints Philip and James, St. Raphael the Archangel, St. Francis of Assisi, All Saints, the Holy Apostles Peter and Paul. The Catholic population of the city was only 96,000. Dependent upon the parish of St. Teresa is the chapel of the miraculous image of Our Lady of Ostrobrama, the centre of many pilgrimages in Lithuania, and venerated also by the Orthodox; its miraculous image stands upon an arch, and the street which passes under this arch is occupied at all hours of the day by a crowd of prostrate suppliants; anyone passing under the arch – even Hebrews – traditionally uncovers the head in token of reverence.

The secular clergy numbered about 440 priests; the cathedral chapter 5 prelates and 3 canons. The secular clergy are educated in the seminary, which has 15 professors and 160 students when founded in 1582, closed in 1862; reopened in 1872, and had but two students, but their number gradually increased. At Brest there was a petit seminaire, which was closed in 1830; the seminary at Białystok was closed in 1842. The clergy always exerted a beneficial influence upon popular education. At the beginning of the nineteenth century twenty-five parochial elementary schools were in operation at Vilnius; schools and colleges were conducted by the Jesuits, Uniates, Basilians, Piarists, and other religious orders. The monastic libraries were centres of culture; as late as the seventeenth century there were 101 monasteries in Lithuania. The library of the Missionaries of Vilnius contained 8284 volumes; that of the Piarists, 7000; that of the Bernardines, 4142. The University of Vilnius possessed 20,000 volumes of theology, part of which were given to the Catholic Theological Academy of St. Petersburg, to the University of Kyiv (Ukraine) and to the Public Library of Vilnius.

The Vilnius region has a large Polish minority (26% of Vilnius county population)

== See also ==
- Bishops of Vilnius
- Diocese of Inflanty
- Catholic Church in Lithuania

== Sources ==
- Frost, Robert (2015). The Oxford History of Poland-Lithuania. The Making of the Polish-Lithuanian Union, 1385—1569. Oxford. ISBN 978-0-19-820869-3.
