= Zabolotye =

Zabolotye Заболотье
- Village
- Location within Arkhangelsk Oblast Location within Russia
- Coordinates: 63°24′N 41°49′E
- Country: Russia
- Region: Arkhangelsk Oblast
- District: Kholmogorsky District

Population (2010)
  - Total: 390
- Time zone: UTC+3:00

Zabolotye (Russian: Заболотье) is a rural locality (a village) and the administrative center of Zachachyevskoye Rural Settlement of Kholmogorsky District, Arkhangelsk Oblast, Russia. The population was 390 as of 2010.

== Geography ==
Zabolotye is located on the Bolshaya Chacha River, 115 km south of Kholmogory (the district's administrative centre) by road. Kuliga is the nearest rural locality.
