= Roman Catholic Archdiocese of Mohilev =

Latin Catholic ecclesiastical territory

Archdiocese of Mohilev Archidioecesis Mohyloviensis
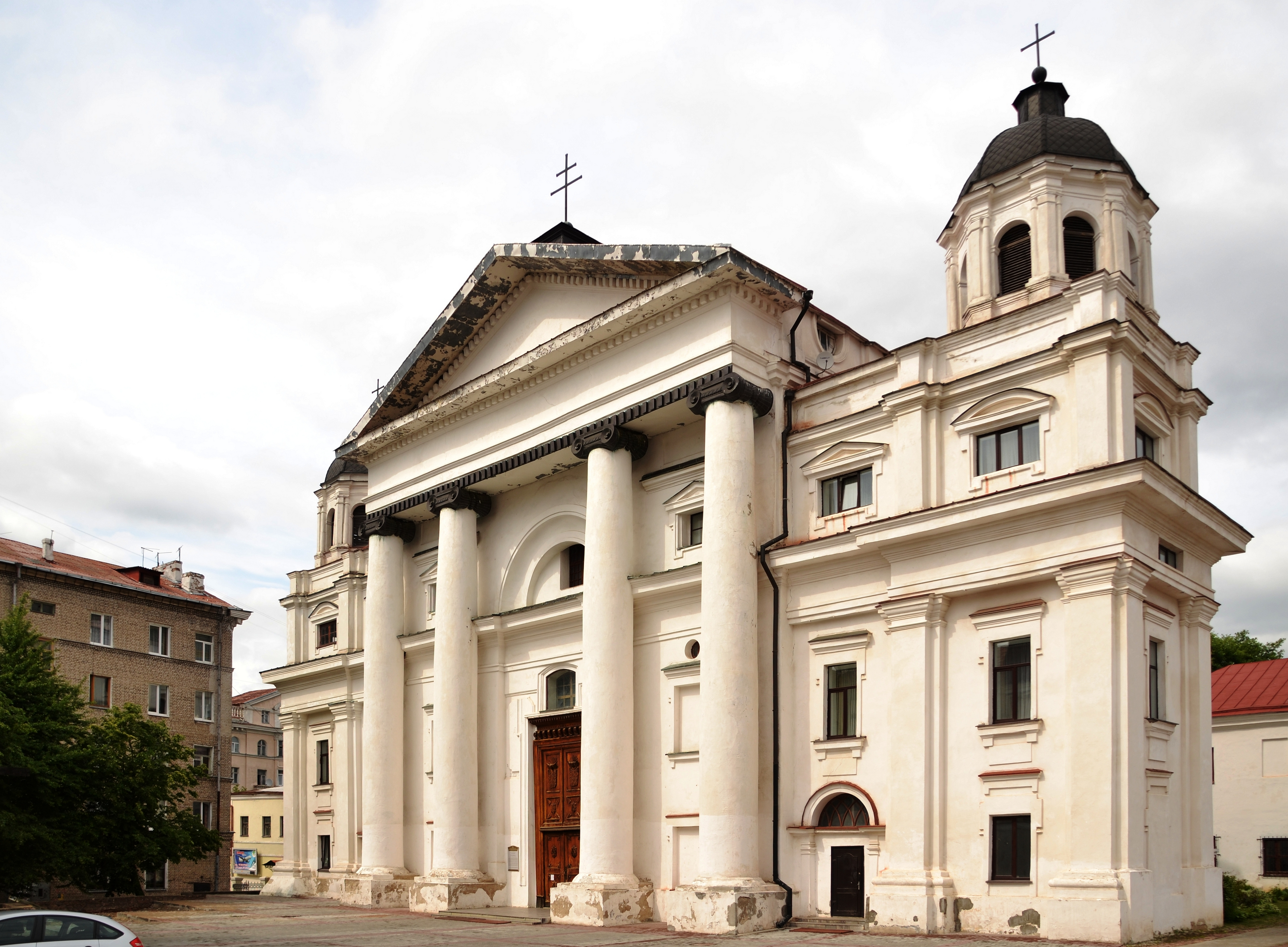
- Church of Saint Stanislaus, Mogilev

Location
- Country: Russia

Information
- First holder: Stanisław Bohusz Siestrzeńcewicz
- Established: 14 December 1772

The Archdiocese of Mohilev (or Mogilev or Mahilyow) was a territorial Latin Catholic ecclesiastical jurisdiction of the Catholic Church, covering the greater part of the territory of the Tsarist Russian Empire (from St Petersburg to Vladivostok). The Cathedral was the Church of the Assumption of the Virgin and St. Stanislav in Mohilev, the co-cathedral was the Cathedral of the Assumption of the Blessed Virgin Mary in Saint Petersburg. Its effective see was the imperial capital city Saint Petersburg.

Throughout its entire existence, it was the largest territorial unit of the Catholic Church in the world. The archdiocese remained the Latin metropolitan see for Russia throughout imperial times and the Soviet period, although for much of the latter period it was the subject of repression and had no incumbent archbishop.

== History ==
The establishment of a bishopric became a necessity as a result of the First Partition of Poland (1772), when significant amounts of territory inhabited by Catholics — mainly Greek Catholics (of the Archeparchy of Polotsk-Vitebsk), but also a substantial number of Roman Catholics — became part of Russia. Previously, only small groups of Catholics, primarily immigrants in large cities, resided in Russia. These Catholics were legally subject to the Justitz-Kollegium (Russian: Юстиц-коллегия) for Livonian, Estonian, and Finnish Affairs.

The Archdiocese was erected as the Diocese of White Ruthenia on 14 December 1772 by the Russian empress Catherine the Great, in a unilateral action independent of Rome. Its territory was split off from the Dioceses of Vilnius (45 parishes including Mohilev), Inflanty and Smolensk, part of the Gniezno Metroplis.

On 17 January 1782, Catherine elevated the diocese to Archdiocese of Mohilev (then without suffragan sees), and in 1783 these actions were recognised by Pope Pius VI in the bull Onerosa pastoralis officii. The ecclesiastical province of the archdiocese included areas seized in the second and third partitions of Poland, resulting in the archdiocese encompassing approximately 693 parishes with 1,280 churches. In 1798, the territorial division of the archdiocese was stabilized, comprising five suffragan dioceses: Vilnius, Samogitia, Lutsk-Zhytomyr, Kamianets, and the new diocese of Minsk. As a result of the Treaty of Tilsit in 1807, the Białystok district was incorporated into the Diocese of Vilnius.

The first seat for the Archbishop of Mohilev in St Petersburg was built in 1783 near the Church of Saint Stanislaw but in 1849 a new residence in the imperial capital city was built in a new site and later, between 1870 and 1873, the new Cathedral of the Assumption of the Blessed Virgin Mary was erected near it.

It repeatedly lost territory, to establish successively the Diocese of Cherson (or Tiraspol) on 3 July 1848, the Apostolic Exarchate of Russia in 1917, the Diocese of Riga on 22 September 1918, the Apostolic Vicariate of Finland on 8 June 1920 and the "Apostolic Vicariate of Siberia" on 1 December 1921 (after 1923 Diocese of Vladivostok).

Mogilev is a city in present-day Belarus, and with the demise of the Soviet Union the Archdiocese's territory and title were merged into its former suffragan of Minsk (which had often been governed ad interim by its Metropolitan, as Apostolic administrator), in the newly independent country's capital, to create the Archdiocese of Minsk-Mohilev on 13 April 1991. The territorial boundaries of the new archdiocese were redrawn to include only territory within Belarus. Territories of the archdiocese falling within present-day Russia were reassigned, first to the Apostolic Administration of European Russia, and subsequently to what are now the Archdiocese of Mother of God at Moscow in the north and the Diocese of Saint Clement at Saratov in the south.

== Episcopal ordinaries ==
All Latin, Roman Rite.

Coadjutor Bishops of Mohilev

- 1783–1812: Jan Benisławski, Titular Bishop of Gadara
- 1798–1811: Cyprian Odyniec
- 1815–1819: Maciej Paweł Możdżeniewski
- 1815–1840: Walery Henryk Kamionko

Metropolitan Archbishops of Mohilev

- 1783–1826: Stanisław Bohusz Siestrzeńcewicz, previously Titular Bishop of Mallus (1773.07.12 – 1783.12.11), Auxiliary Bishop of Vilnius (Lithuania) (1773.07.12 – 1783.12.11)
- 1828–1831: Kacper Kazimierz Cieciszowski, previously Titular Bishop of Theveste (1775.05.29 – 1784.08.07), Coadjutor Bishop of Kyiv–Černihiv (Ukraine) (1775.05.29 – 1784.08.07), succeeding as Bishop of Kyiv–Černihiv (1784.08.07 – 1798.11.17), Bishop of Lutsk and Zytomierz (Ukraine) (1798.11.17 – 1828.06.23)
- 1841: Ignacy Ludwik Pawłowski, previously Titular Bishop of Megara (1828.06.23 – 1841.03.01), Auxiliary Bishop of Kamyanets-Podilsky (Ukraine) (1828.06.23 – 1841.03.01)
- 1849–1851: Kazimierz Dmochowski, previously Auxiliary Bishop of Vilnius (Lithuania) (1840.12.17 – 1848.07.03), Titular Bishop of Meloë in Lycia (1840.12.17 – 1849.07.17), Auxiliary Bishop of Žemaitija (Lithuania) (1848.07.03 – 1849.07.17)
- 1851–1855: Ignacy Hołowiński, succeeding as previous Titular Bishop of Carystus & Coadjutor Archbishop of Mohilev (1848.07.03 – 1851.01.24)
- 1856–1863: Wacław Żyliński, previously Bishop of Vilnius (Lithuania) (1848.07.03 – 1856.10.27)
- 1872–1883: Antoni Fijałkowski, previously Titular Bishop of Tanasia & Auxiliary Bishop of Kamyanets-Podilsky (Ukraine) (1858.06.25 – 1860.03.23), succeeding as Bishop of Kamyanets-Podilsky (1860.03.23 – 1872.02.23); also Apostolic Administrator of Minsk (Belarus) (1872.02.23 – 1883.02.11)
- 1883–1889: Aleksander Gintowt-Dziewałtowski, previously Bishop of Lutsk and Zytomierz (Ukraine) (1883.03.15 – 1891.12.14) and Apostolic Administrator of Kamyanets-Podilsky (Ukraine) (1883.03.15 – 1891.12.14); also Apostolic Administrator of Minsk (Belarus) (1891.12.14 – 1899.11.26)
- 1891–1899: Szymon Marcin Kozłowski, previously Bishop of Lutsk and Zytomierz (Ukraine) (1883.03.15 – 1891.12.14), Apostolic Administrator of Kamyanets-Podilsky (Ukraine) (1883.03.15 – 1891.12.14); also Apostolic Administrator of Minsk (Belarus) (1891.12.14 – 1899.11.26)
- 1901–1903: Bolesław Hieronim Kłopotowski, previously Titular Bishop of Eleutheropolis (1897.08.02 – 1899.12.14), Auxiliary Bishop of Lutsk and Zytomierz (Ukraine) (1897.08.02 – 1899.12.14), then Bishop of Lutsk and Zytomierz (Ukraine) (1899.12.14 – 1901.04.15), Apostolic Administrator of Kamyanets-Podilsky (Ukraine) (1899.12.14 – 1901.04.15); also Apostolic Administrator of Minsk (Belarus) (1901.04.15 – 1903.02.24)
- 1903–1905: Jerzy Józef Szembek, previously Bishop of Płock (Poland) (1901.04.15 – 1903.11.09); also Apostolic Administrator of Minsk (Belarus) (1903.11.09 – 1905.08.07)
- 1908–1909: Apolinary Wnukowski, previously Bishop of Płock (Poland) (1904.04.01 – 1908.11.29); also Apostolic Administrator of Minsk (Belarus) (1908.11.29 – 1909.06.04)
- 1910–1914: Wincenty Kluczyński; also Apostolic Administrator of Minsk (Belarus) (1910.04.07 – 1914.09.22); later Titular Archbishop of Philippopolis (modern (Sofia and) Plovdiv, Bulgaria) (1914.09.22 – 1917.02.23)
- 1917–1926: Eduard von der Ropp, previously Bishop of Tiraspol (Moldova) (1902.06.09 – 1903.11.09), Bishop of Vilnius (Lithuania) (1903.11.09 – 1917.07.25); also Apostolic Administrator of Vilnius (Lithuania) (1917.07.25 – 1918.10.23)
- 1923.07.05 – 1925.12.14 Jan Cieplak, as Apostolic Administrator; previously Titular Bishop of Evaria (1908.07.12 – 1919.03.28), Auxiliary Bishop of Mohilev (Belarus) (1908.07.12 – 1925.12.14), Titular Archbishop of Acrida (Epirus) (1919.03.28 – 1925.12.14); later Metropolitan Archbishop of Vilnius (Lithuania) (1925.12.14 – 1926.02.17)
- 1926–1981: Boļeslavs Sloskāns, as Apostolic administrator, also Titular Bishop of Cillium (1926.05.05 – 1981.04.18); also Apostolic Administrator of Minsk (Belarus) (1926.08.13 – 1981.04.18).

== See also ==
- Catholic Church in Russia

== Sources and external links ==
- GCatholic.org, with incumbent biography links
- Catholic Hierarchy
