= Meloë (Lycia) =

Town in ancient Lycia

Meloë (Ancient Greek: Μελόη) was a town in ancient Lycia, located near Cape Kilidonia.

== Bishops ==
When speaking of the bishopric of Meloë in Lycia, Le Quien assigned to it three bishops mentioned in the acts of relatively late church councils. To do so, he assumes that Meloë was also called Mela. The first is Nicetas. who signed the acts of the Second Council of Nicaea (787) as "Nicetas of Mela". Another is Paulus, who signed the acts of the Council of Constantinople (869) and those of the Council of Constantinople (879) as "Paulus of Mela". Also present at the last of these councils was "Petrus of Meloë". Le Quien takes it that Paulus became bishop under Patriarch Ignatius of Constantinople and Petrus under Photius. Gams accepts Le Quien's list of three named bishops.

Le Quien mentions as present at the council of 787 a bishop of Mela in Bithynia whose name is given in some accounts as Nicetas, the name also of the Nicetas of Mela whom Le Quien assigns to Meloë in Lycia, while other accounts refer to him as Nectarius. In his study of the 787 council, Darrouzès also assigns this Nicetas of Mela to Mela in Bithynia. Le Quien likewise mentions as bishop of Mela in Bithynia "Paulus of Mela", present at the councils of 869 and 879. Gams, on the other hand, makes no mention of Mela in Bithynia among the bishoprics of either Bithynia Prima or Bithynia Secunda.

No longer a residential bishopric, Meloë in Lycia is now listed by the Catholic Church as a titular see.
