= Preconization =

Public announcement or proclamation

A preconization (Late Lat. praeconizatio, from praeconizare, "to proclaim", Lat. praeco, "a public crier") is a public proclamation or announcement. In this sense it is practically obsolete; but the word is still technically used of the solemn proclamation of new bishops, and of the sees to which they are appointed, made by the pope in the consistory of cardinals.

== Description ==
In its strict juridical sense, it refers to the ratification in a public consistory of the choice made by a third person of a titular of a consistorial benefice, for example a bishopric. The pope approves the election or postulation of the titular made by a chapter, or ratifies the presentation of a candidate made by the civil power. This preconization is preceded by an informative process, which according to the present discipline is raised by the Consistorial Congregation for the countries not under Congregation of Propaganda, but the information is furnished by the Secretary of State if the question at hand refers to sees situated outside of Italy.
