= Church of St. Catherine (Saint Petersburg) =

Church in Saint Petersburg, Russia

- Catholic Church of St. Catherine of Alexandria (Russian: Католическая церковь Святой Екатерины)
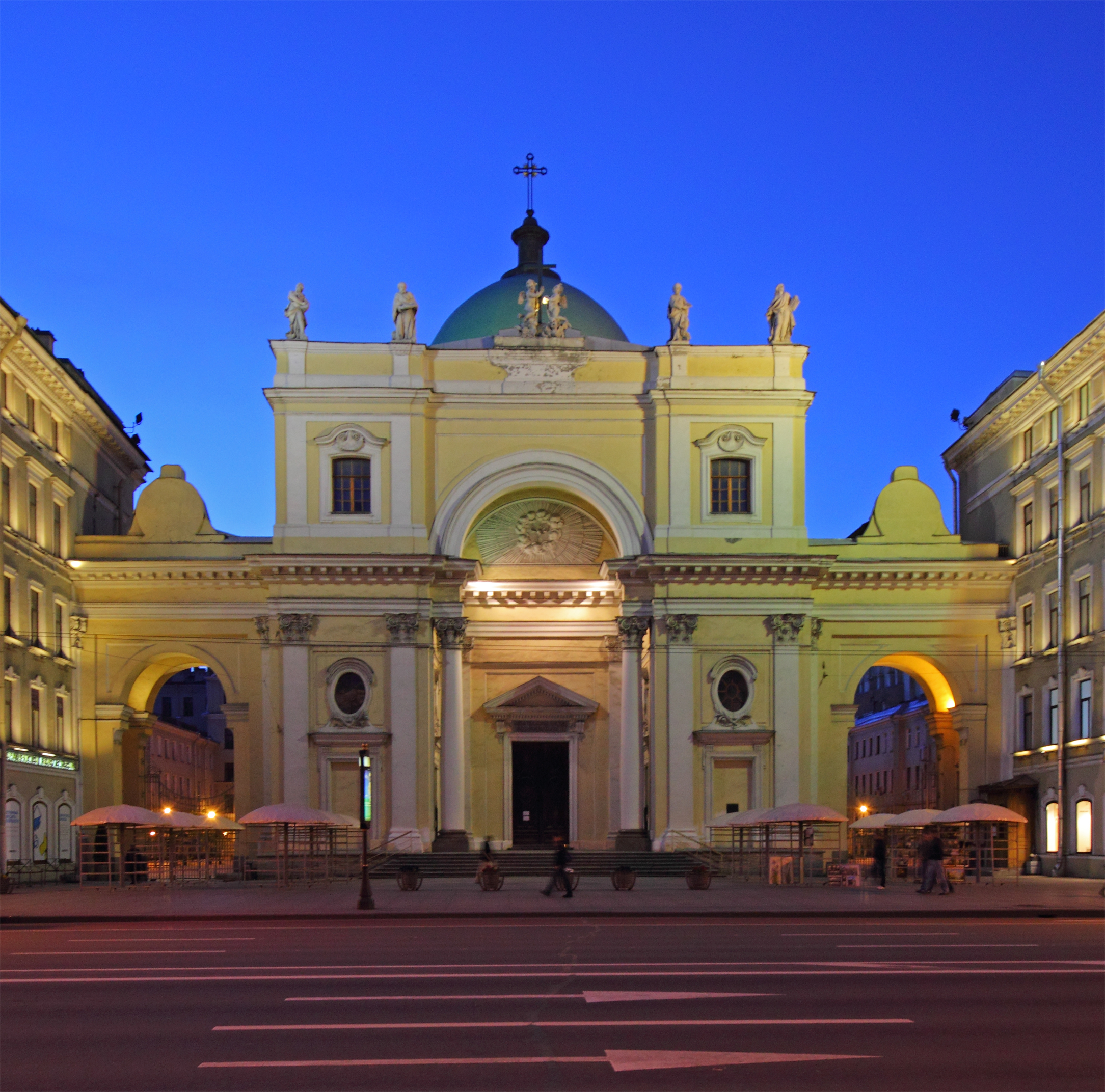
- The Catholic Church of St. Catherine from Nevsky Prospekt
- Church of St. Catherine
- 59.9357°N 30.329°E
- Location: 32–34 Nevsky Prospekt, Saint Petersburg
- Country: Russian Federation
- Denomination: Catholic

History
- Status: Minor basilica
- Founded: 1716
- Consecrated: 1783

Architecture
- Functional status: Active
- Architect(s): Jean-Baptiste Vallin de la Mothe; Antonio Rinaldi
- Groundbreaking: 1763
- Completed: October 7, 1783

Specifications
- Capacity: 2,000
- Length: 44m
- Width: 25m
- Height: 42m

Administration
- Diocese: Archdiocese of Moscow

Clergy
- Archbishop: Paolo Pezzi

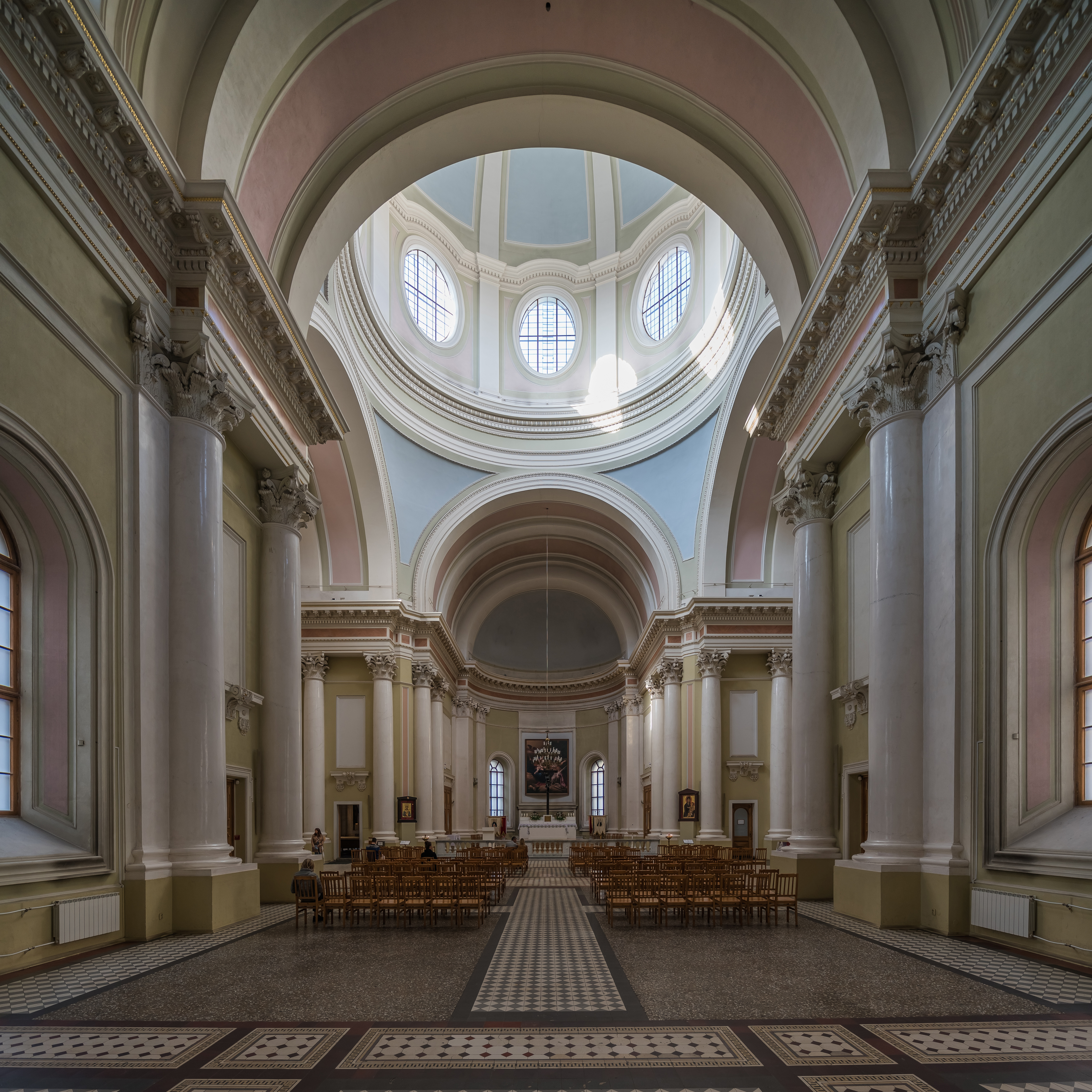
Interior of St. Catherine's Church

The Catholic Church of St Catherine (Russian: Католическая церковь Святой Екатерины) in St. Petersburg is the oldest Catholic church in the Russian Federation, and the only church with the title of basilica (status granted on 23 July 2013). It is located on the Nevsky Prospekt and is a part of the Archdiocese of Moscow headed by Msgr. Paolo Pezzi.

== History ==
=== Construction ===
On December 12, 1705, Peter the Great signed a charter that would allow the construction of Catholic churches in Russia. The church itself (though not the building with which it is today associated) was founded in 1710.

In 1738 Empress Anna granted permission for the church to erect a structure on Nevsky Prospekt, the main street of St. Petersburg. The project, however, met continued problems. The initial designs were based on work by Domenico Trezzini, the architect who designed the Peter and Paul Cathedral and was then deceased. His designs, however, were abandoned in 1751. In the 1760s, the French architect Jean-Baptiste Vallin de la Mothe drew designs for the church, but he returned to France in 1775 and it fell to the Italian architect Antonio Rinaldi to complete the church. On October 7, 1783, the church was completed. Because the empress at the time was Catherine II of Russia (also known as Catherine the Great), the church was named after St. Catherine of Alexandria. The parish church was then part of the Archdiocese of Mohilev.

=== During the Russian Empire ===
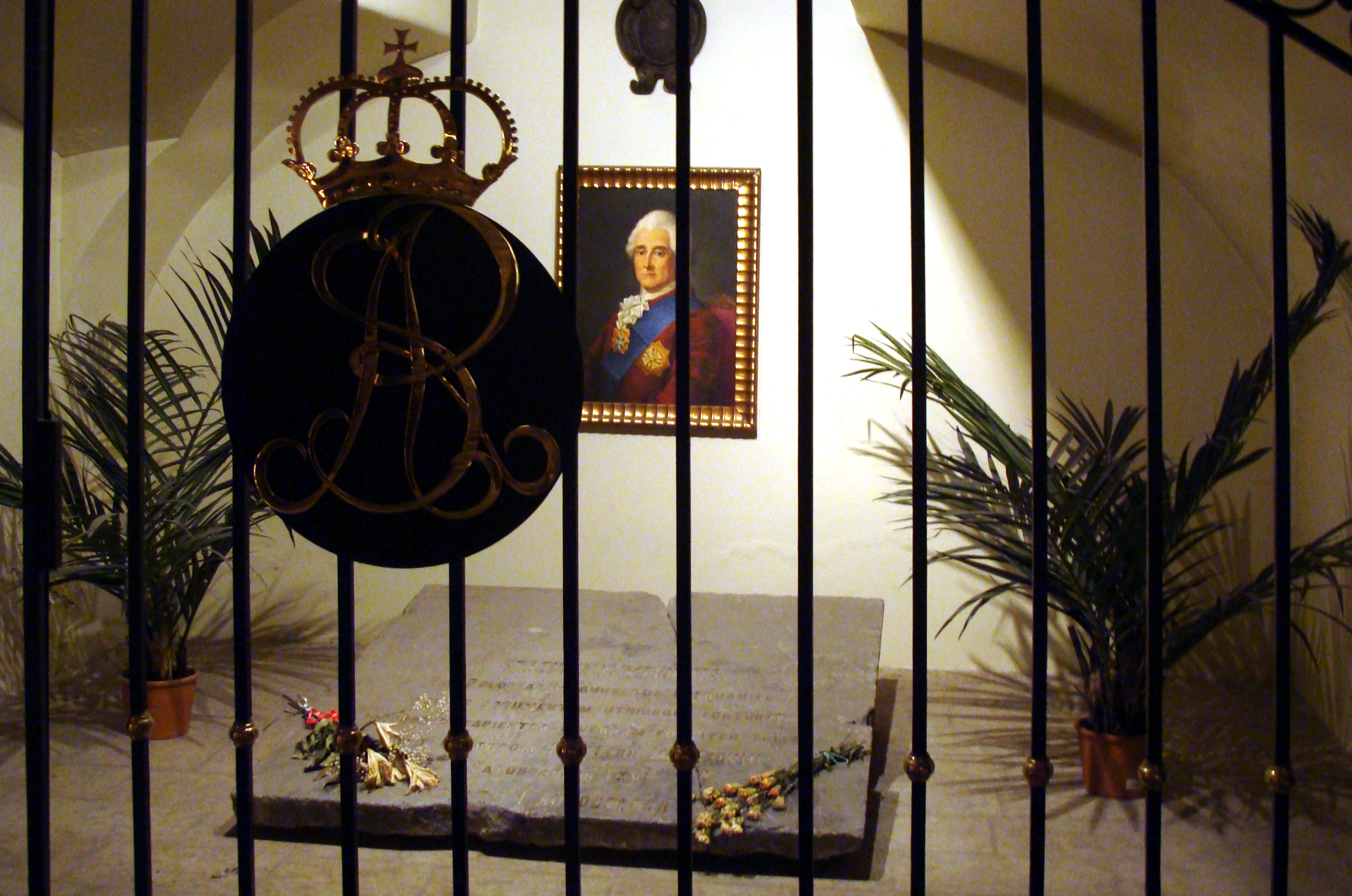
The original burial place and grave of the last king of the Polish–Lithuanian Commonwealth, Stanisław August Poniatowski - fot. Ivonna Nowicka, 2015

The Catholic Church of St. Catherine is connected with many important personalities of Imperial Russia and other countries. In 1798, Stanisław II Augustus, the last king of Poland, was buried at the church (in 1938, after 140 years in the crypt, his remains were brought back to Poland), as was, in 1813, the French general Jean Victor Marie Moreau. One parishioner of the church was Auguste de Montferrand, who would go on to build the Saint Isaac's Cathedral. Auguste de Montferrand married in the church and later had a wake here before his wife took his coffin back to France. Even in Imperial Russia, several well-known aristocrats had accepted Catholicism.

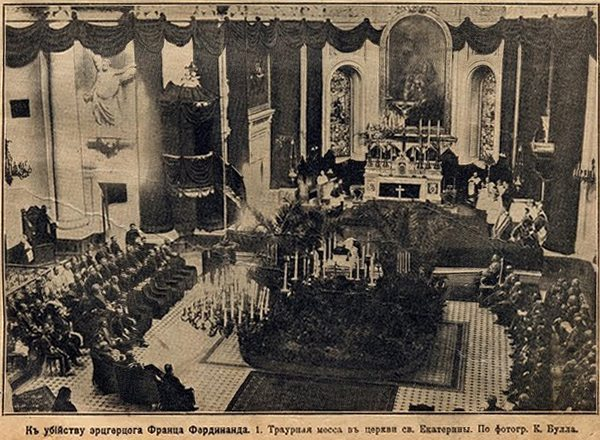
Requiem Mass for Archduke Franz Ferdinand of Austria at St. Catherine's Church, St. Petersburg, published in a Russian newspaper, 1914

The church was run by different monastic orders in its history. Originally run by Franciscans in 1800 Emperor Paul I turned the church over to the Jesuits. In 1815, the church was run by Dominicans, and finally in 1892, the church ceased to be governed by an order and fell under the auspices of Diocesan priests (then archdiocese of Mogilev), though a Dominican community remained at the church. On the eve of the Russian Revolution of 1917, the church membership numbered more than thirty thousand parishioners.

=== Soviet persecution ===
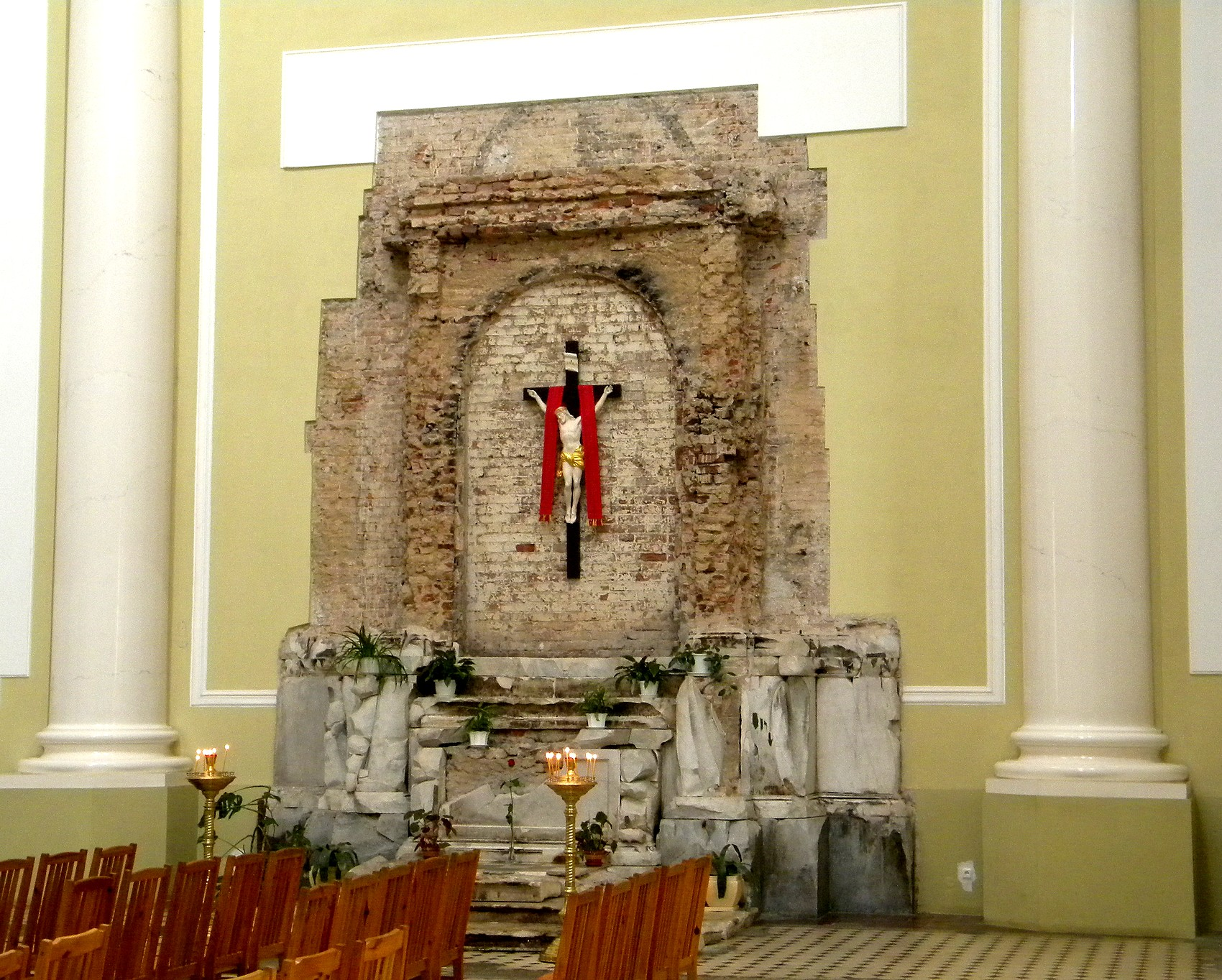
Following restoration, the right altar was preserved as a monument in the state it was in after years of neglect and deliberate destruction.

Under the Soviets, the activities of the church were repressed.

After a show trial prosecuted by Nikolai Krylenko that made headlines worldwide, the rector of St. Catherine's Church, Monsignor Konstanty Budkiewicz, was found guilty of anti-Soviet agitation for organizing nonviolent resistance against the First Soviet anti-religious campaign. He was shot by the OGPU in the Lubyanka Prison on Easter Sunday, 1923.

After the execution of Budkiewicz, his body was buried in a mass grave in the forests of the Sokolniki District.

According to Christopher Zugger, "On Easter Sunday, the world was told that the Monsignor was still alive, and Pope Pius XI publicly prayed at St. Peter's that the Soviets would spare his life. Moscow officials told foreign ministers and reporters that the Monsignor's sentence was just, and that the Soviet Union was a sovereign nation that would accept no interference. In reply to an appeal from the rabbis of New York City to spare Budkiewicz's life, Pravda wrote a blistering editorial against 'Jewish bankers who rule the world' and bluntly warned that the Soviets would kill Jewish opponents of the Revolution as well. Only on April 4 did the truth finally emerge: the Monsignor had already been in the grave for three days. When the news came to Rome, Pope Pius fell to his knees and wept as he prayed for the priest's soul. To make matters worse, Cardinal Gasparri had just finished reading a note from the Soviets saying that 'everything was proceeding satisfactorily' when he was handed the telegram announcing the execution."

On 7 April 1923, a requiem mass was offered for Mgr. Budkiewicz at St. Catherine's Church in Petrograd. Several foreign diplomats were in attendance.

The church, however, remained open until 1938. In 1938 the church was closed and ransacked. Artifacts, icons and books from the church's splendid library were thrown out to the street. The church was further damaged by a fire in 1947, that destroyed the internal decorations of the church and its organ.

For 30 years, the building was used only as storage space for the nearby "Museum of History of Religion and of Atheism" located in the former Cathedral of Our Lady of Kazan. In the late 1970s, plans were made to rebuild the church as an organ hall for the Saint Petersburg Philharmonic Orchestra. These plans were never completed, however, as the building was again ravaged by fire in 1984. Instead the government used the building as offices and apartments.

=== Restoration ===
Following the collapse of the Soviet Union, the Catholic Church in Russia began to operate once more in the early 1990s. In February 1992, city authorities decided to return the building to the Catholic Church. That same year, the church began rebuilding. According to the church, after being closed by the Soviets in 1938, a 20-year-old woman went into the ransacked temple and retrieved the crucifix out of the sanctuary. When the building was returned to the Catholic Church, she returned the crucifix. The first stage of restoration was finished by October 1992, with a temporary altar in place for worship. In October 1998 a Chapel of the Annunciation was opened. The main altar was completed and blessed in 2000. The restoration of most of the church was completed in 2003, and the central gates were opened. Restoration of the interior of the church is ongoing.

== Architecture ==
Like many churches, the building is in the shape of a Latin cross. The transept of the church is crowned by a large cupola. The temple is 44 m in length, 25 m in width, and 42 m in height. The sanctuary has room for about 2,000 people. The main façade of the church has a monumental arched portal, which rests on self-supporting columns. Above the façade is a high parapet, with the figures of four evangelists and angels on top. Above the main entrance is an inscription from the Gospel of Matthew (in Latin): "My house shall be called the house of prayer" (Matthew 21:13) and the date the church was completed.

== See also ==
- List of Jesuit sites
- Our Lady of Mount Carmel Church, Gatchina
