= Conference of Roman Catholic Bishops in Ukraine =

Assembly of Catholic bishops

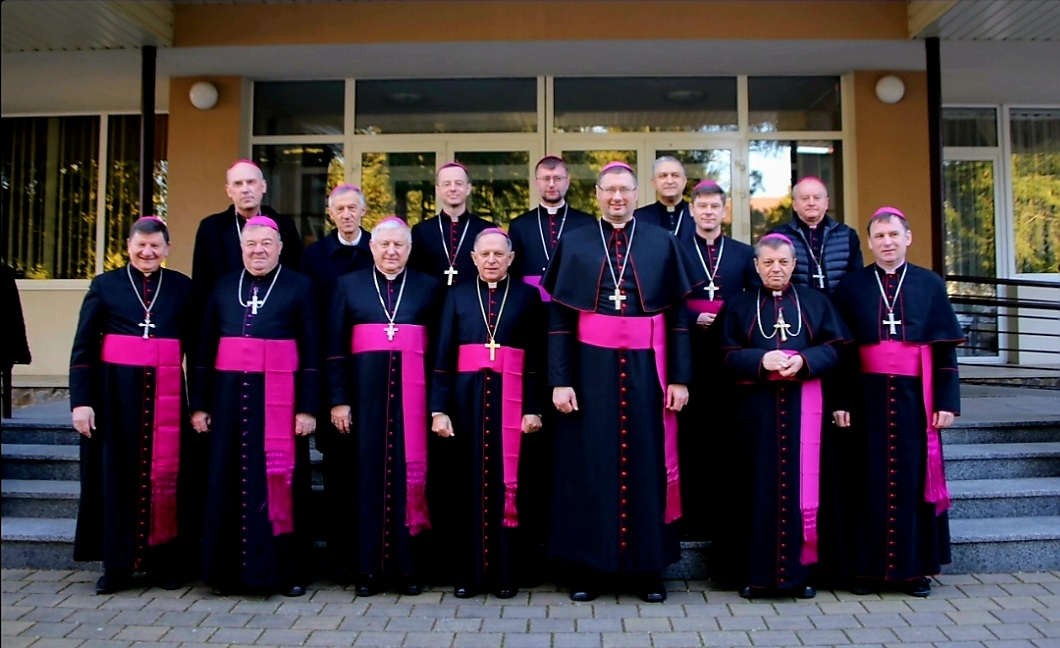
Episcopal 2023.jpg

The Catholic bishops of Ukraine divide into 2 different conferences. There is the Conference of Roman Catholic Bishops in Ukraine (Ukrainian: Конференція Римо-Католицьких Єпископів України, romanized: Konferentsiia Rymo-Katolytskykh Yepyskopiv Ukrainy, Latin: Latin: Conferentia episcoporum Ucrainae) and there is the Synod of Bishops of Ukrainian Catholic Church (Byzantine rite) (Latin: Synod Ecclesiae Ucrainae Catholic (bycantini)).

Both conferences are a member of the Council of the Bishops' Conferences of Europe.

== The Synod ==
President of the Ukrainian Catholic Church is His Beatitude Sviatoslav Shevchuk, Archbishop and Metropolitan of Kyiv in Ukraine.

== Bureau ==
President: Vitalii Skomarovskyi, Diocesan Bishop of Diocese of Lutsk.

Vitalii Kryvytskyi is the Vice President, and Eduard Kava is the Secretary.

== Secretaries and commissions ==
- Commission for Family Marian Buczek, coadjutor bishop of Lviv
- Commission for religious women's orders, Leon Malyi, Auxiliary Bishop of Lviv
- Commission for priestly vocation, Jan Purwinski, Emeritus Bishop of Kyiv and Zhytomyr
- Commission for charitable and philanthropic support, Stanislav Shyrokoradiuk, OFM, Auxiliary Bishop of Kyiv and Zhytomyr
- Commission for Public Relations and Mass Media, Vitalii Skomarovskyi, Auxiliary Bishop of Kyiv and Zhytomyr
- Commission for Catechesis, Leon Dubrawski, OFM, Bishop of Kamjanets-Podilskyi
- Commission for Religious Order of men, Stanislaw Padewski, OFM Cap, Emeritus Bishop of Kharkiv and Zaporizhzhia
- Commission on Environment and Tourism, Antal Majnek, OFM, Bishop of Mukachevo
- Commission for the faith, Bronislaw Bernacki, Bishop of Odesa and Simferopol

== See also ==
- Caritas Ukraine, the charity of the Greek Catholic Church in Ukraine
- Caritas-Spes Ukraine, the charity of the Roman Catholic Church in Ukraine
