= Diocese of Kyiv-Zhytomyr =

Roman Catholic diocese in Ukraine

Coordinates: 50.2548°N 28.6547°E

Diocese of Kyiv-Zhytomyr Dioecesis Kioviensis-Zytomeriensis Єпархія Київ-Житомир

Catholic
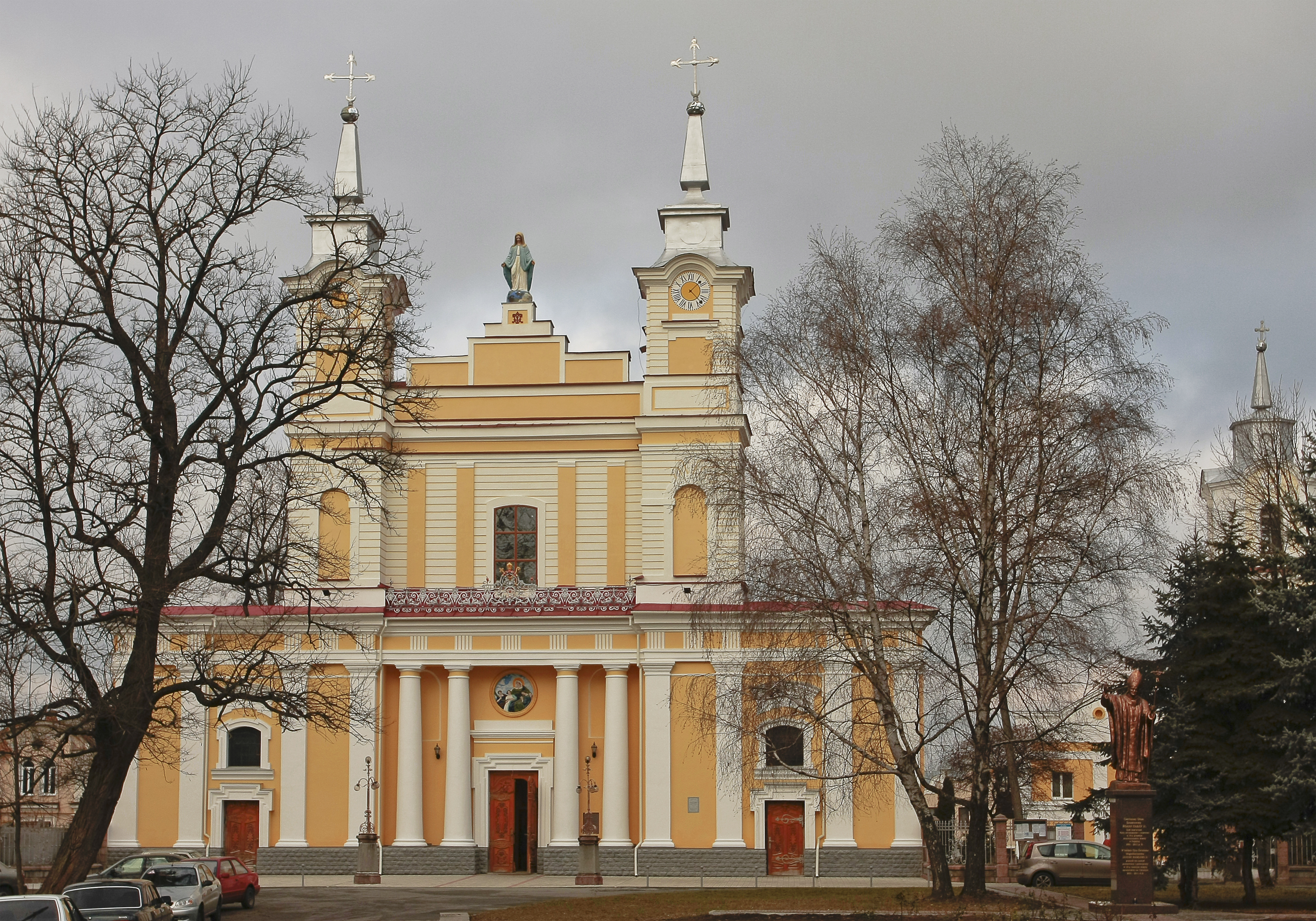

Location
- Country: Ukraine
- Ecclesiastical province: Lviv

Statistics
- Area: 222,300 km^{2} (85,800 sq mi)
- Population: Total; Catholics: (as of 2015); ▼8,165,300; ▼219,200 ( 2.7%)

Information
- Rite: Latin
- Cathedral: St. Sophia's Cathedral, Zhytomyr
- Co-cathedral: Co-Cathedral of St. Alexander, Kyiv

Current leadership
- Pope: Leo XIV
- Bishop: Vitaliy Kryvytskyi, S.D.B.
- Metropolitan Archbishop: Mieczysław Mokrzycki
- Auxiliary Bishops: Oleksandr Yazlovetskiy, Serhii Kippa

The Roman Catholic Diocese of Kyiv-Zhytomyr (Latin: Dioecesis Kioviensis-Zytomeriensis) is a suffragan diocese of the Latin Church of the Catholic Church in Ukraine in ecclesiastical province of the Metropolitan Archdiocese of Lviv of the Latins.

Its cathedral episcopal see is the St. Sophia's Cathedral, Zhytomyr. It also has, both in Kyiv: a Co-Cathedral of St. Alexander, and a former cathedral, now Church of St. Nicholas.

== History ==
- Established in 1321 as Diocese of Kyiv / Chiovien(sis) (Latin) / Kiovien(sis) (Latin adjective)
- The Diocese of Kyiv was established once more in 1405, with the help of the Dominican order.
- Renamed in 1638 as Diocese of Kijów-Czernihów / Kyiv and Chernihiv (English) / Kiovien(sis) et Chiovien(sis) (Latin)
- Suppressed on 1798.08.08, its territory being reassigned to establish the Roman Catholic Diocese of Lutsk and Zytomierz.
- Restored on 1998.11.25 as Diocese of Kyïv–Zhytomyr / Kiovien(sis)–Zytomerien(sis) (Latin) on territory split off from the suppressed Diocese of Zhytomyr (itself split off in 1925 from the Diocese of Lutsk-Zhytomyr), whose last incumbent was appointed here
- Lost a substantial portion of the diocesan territory on 4 May 2002, to establish the Diocese of Kharkiv–Zaporizhia.

== Statistics ==
As per 2014, it pastorally served 219,600 Catholics (2.7% of 8,182,668 total) on 111,600 km² in 162 parishes and 124 missions with 160 priests (60 diocesan, 100 religious), 277 lay religious (112 brothers, 165 sisters) and 36 seminarians.

== Episcopal ordinaries ==
(all Roman Rite)

Suffragan Bishops of Kyiv (Kijów, Kiev)

- Henryk, Dominican Order (O.P.) (1321 – ?)
- Jakub, O.P. (? – death 1386)
- Mikołaj, O.P. (? – ?)
- Borzysław, O.P. (? – ?)
- Andrzej (1397 – death 1434)
- Jan (? – death 1466)
- Klemens (? – death 1473)
- Jan Filipowicz (1519 – death 1537)
- Franciszek (? – death 1551)
- Jan Andruszewicz (1545 – 1556.08.27), next Bishop of Łuck and Włodzimierz (Poland) (1556.08.27 – death 1567)
- Mikołaj Pac (1557 – death 1585)
- Józef Wereszczyński (1592 – death 1598)
- Krzysztof Kazimirski (1598 – death 1618.06.15)
- Bogusław Radoszewski (1619.01.17 – 1633.06.06), next Bishop of Łuck (Poland) (1633.06.06 – death 1638)
- Bishop-elect Andrzej Szołdrski (1633 – 1635.01.14); after his episcopal consecration Bishop of Poznań (Poland) (1635.01.14 – death 1650.04.01) and Bishop of Przemyśl (Poland) (1635.08.14 – 1636.07.21)

Suffragan Bishops of Kijów–Czernihów

- Aleksander Sokołowski (1636.07.21 – death 1645.05.09)
- Stanisław Zaremba (1646.04.23 – death 1653.08.03)
- Jan Leszczyński (1655–1656)
- Tomasz Ujejski, Jesuit Order (S.J.) (1656 – resigned 1676), also/next Auxiliary Bishop of Warmia (Poland) (1666 – death 1689.08.01)
  - Auxiliary Bishop: Stanislaus Giannotti, Canons Regular of Saint Augustine (C.R.S.A.) (1659.12.01 – death 1681), Titular Bishop of Fez (1659.12.01 – 1681)
- Jan Stanisław Witwicki (1679.06.12 – 1682.05.25), next Bishop of Łuck (Poland) (1682.05.25 – 1687.11.24), Bishop of Poznań (Poland) (1687.11.24 – 1698.03.04)
- Andrzej Chryzostom Załuski (1683.11.15 – 1692.10.15), next Bishop of Płock (Poland) (1692.10.15 – 1699.05.25), Bishop of Warmia (Poland) ([1698.06.06] 1699.05.25 – death 1711.05.01) and Apostolic Administrator of Sambia (Prussia) (1699.05.25 – 1711.05.01)
- Mikołaj Stanisław Święcicki (1697–1699), next Bishop of Poznań (Poland) (1699 – death 1707)
- Jan Paweł Gomoliński (1698 – death 1711)
- Walenty Maciej Arcemberski (? – 1717)
- Jan Joachim Tarło, S.J. (1718.12.05 – 1723.03.15), next Bishop of Poznań (Poland) ([1722] 1723.03.15 – 1732.08.13)
- Samuel Jan Ożga (1723.09.27 – death 1756.04.19)
  - Coadjutor Bishop: Józef Antoni Łaszcz (1741.08.07 – 1748.01.31), Titular Bishop of Antipatris (1738.06.23 – 1748.01.31), previously as Auxiliary Bishop of Diocese of Chełm (Poland) (1738.06.23 – 1741.08.07)
  - Auxiliary Bishop: Antoni Dominik Tyszkiewicz (1739.07.20 – 1740.09.16), Titular Bishop of Mennith (1739.07.20 – 1740.09.16); later Bishop of Samogitia (Lithuania) (1740.09.16 – death 1762.01.31)
- Kajetan Ignacy Sołtyk (1756.04.19 – 1759.03.13), succeeding as previous Coadjutor Bishop of Kijów–Czernihów (1749.09.22 – 1756.04.19) and Titular Bishop of Emmaus (1749.09.22 – 1756.04.19); later Bishop of Kraków (Poland) ([1759.02.12] 1759.03.13 – death 1788.07.30)
- Józef Andrzej Załuski (1759.09 – death 1774.01.07)
  - Auxiliary Bishop: Józef Michał Ignacy Franciszek Olędzki, Piarists (Sch. P.) (1763.01.24 – retired 1781), Titular Bishop of Cambysopolis (1763.01.24 – death 1803)
- Ignacy Franciszek Ossoliński, Conventual Franciscans (O.F.M. Conv.) (1774.01.07 – death 1784.08.07), previously Titular Bishop of Dardanus (1765.04.22 – 1774.01.07), first as Coadjutor Bishop of Bacău (Moldavia) (1765.04.22 – 1773.12.20), then as Coadjutor Bishop of Kijów–Czernihów (1773.12.20 – succession 1774.01.07)
  - Auxiliary Bishop: Franciszek Remigiusz Zambrzycki (1781.12.10 – death 1826), Titular Bishop of Dardanus (1781.12.10 – 1826)
- Kacper Kazimierz Cieciszowski (1784.08.07 – 1798.11.17), succeeding as former Titular Bishop of Theveste (1775.05.29 – 1784.08.07) and Coadjutor Bishop of Kijów–Czernihów (1775.05.29 – 1784.08.07); later Bishop of Lutsk and Zytomierz (Russian Partition) (1798.11.17 – 1828.06.23), Metropolitan Archbishop of Mohilev (Russian Partition) (1828.06.23 – 1831.04.28)
- long vacancy, yet :
  - Auxiliary Bishop: Cyryl Lubowidzki (1884.03.24 – 1897.08.02), Titular Bishop of Dulma (1884.03.24 – 1897.08.02); later Bishop of Lutsk and Zytomierz (Ukraine) (1897.08.02 – death 1898.06.09) and Apostolic Administrator of Diocese of Kamyanets-Podilsky (Ukraine) (1897.08.02 – 1898.06.09)
  - Apostolic Administrator Father Teofil Skalski (1926–1932), no other prelature

Suffragan Bishops of Kyïv–Zhytomyr

- Jan Purwinski (16 January 1991 – retired 15 June 2011), previously last Bishop of mother see Žytomyr (Ukraine) (1991.01.16 – 1998.11.25)
  - Auxiliary Bishop: Stanislav Shyrokoradiuk, O.F.M. (1998.11.25 – 2014.04.12), Titular Bishop of Surista (1994.11.26 – 2014.04.12), previously as Auxiliary Bishop of Diocese of Žytomyr (Ukraine) (1994.11.26 – 1998.11.25); also Apostolic Administrator of Diocese of Lutsk (Ukraine) (2012.07.24 – 2014.04.12); later Bishop of Kharkiv–Zaporizhia (Ukraine) (2014.04.12 – ...)
- Archbishop Petro (Herkulan) Malchuk, O.F.M. (born Slobozia-Rașcov, Moldava) (15 June 2011 – 27 May 2016)
- Apostolic Administrator Vitaliy Skomarovskyi (2016.05.31 – ...), while Bishop of Luck (Ukraine) (2014.04.12 – ...); formerly Titular Bishop of Bencenna (2003.04.07 – 2014.04.12) as Auxiliary Bishop of Kyïv–Žytomyr (Ukraine) (2003.04.07 – 2014.04.12).
- Bishop Vitaliy Kryvytskyi, S.D.B. (2017.04.30 – ...), no previous prelature.

== See also ==
- List of Catholic dioceses in Ukraine
- Roman Catholicism in Ukraine

== Sources and external links ==
- Diocesan website
- GCatholic.org, with Google map & satellite photo – data for all sections
- Catholic Hierarchy
