= St. Barbara's Church, Berdychiv =

Roman Catholic Church in Berdychiv, Ukraine

Coordinates: 49.8933°N 28.5885°E

St Barbara's Catholic Church, Berdychiv
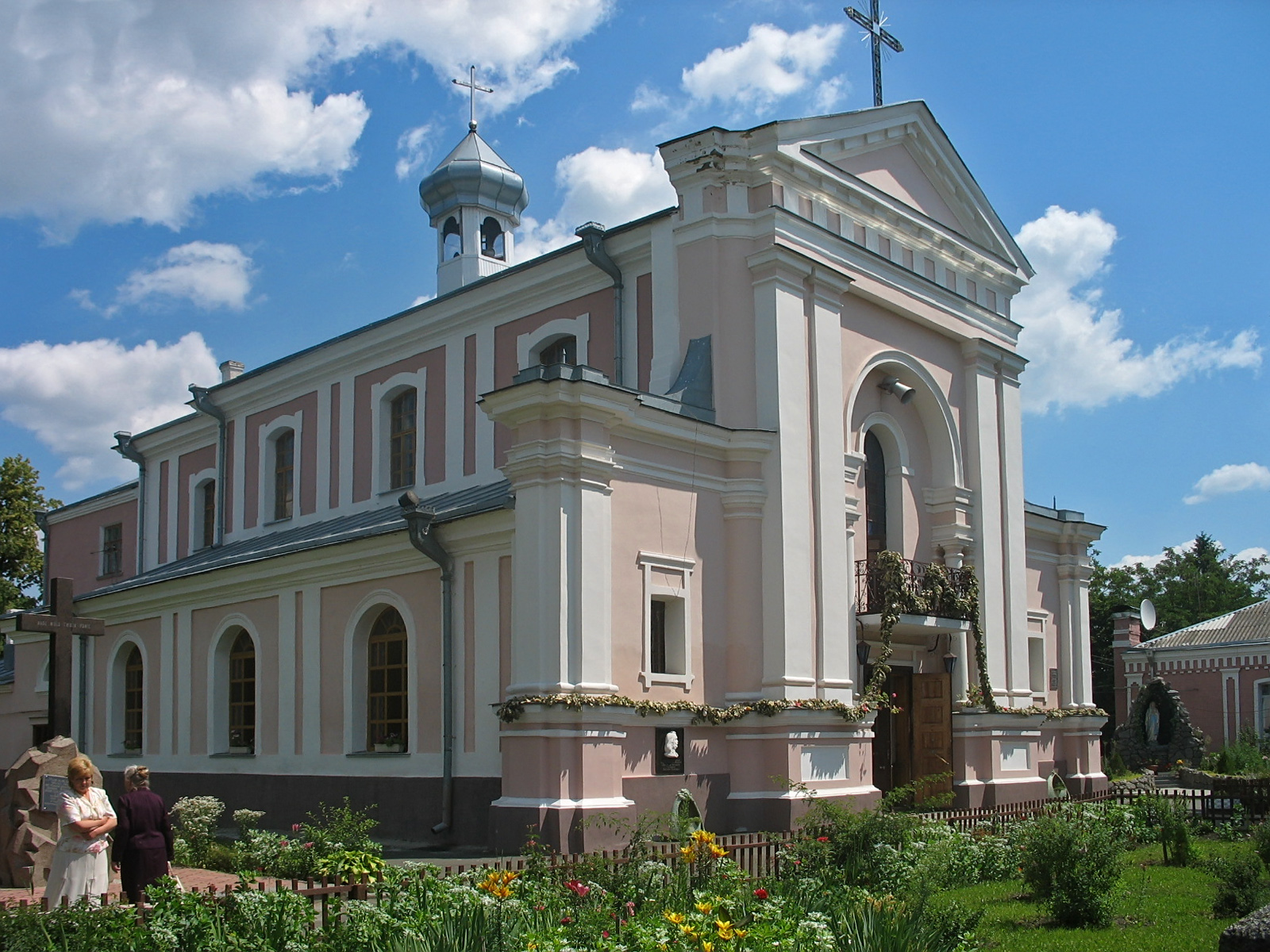
- St Barbara's Catholic Church, Berdychiv
- Location: City of Berdychiv
- Country: Ukraine
- Denomination: Roman Catholic

History
- Founded: 1759

Architecture
- Style: Baroque
- Years built: 1826

Administration
- District: Berdychiv Raion
- Province: Lviv
- Diocese: Zhytomyr
- Parish: St Barbara, Berdychiv

Clergy
- Bishop: Archbishop Petro Malchuk

Immovable Monument of National Significance of Ukraine
- Official name: Костьол Варвари (Church of St. Barbara)
- Type: Architecture
- Reference no.: 060024

Rzewuski arms

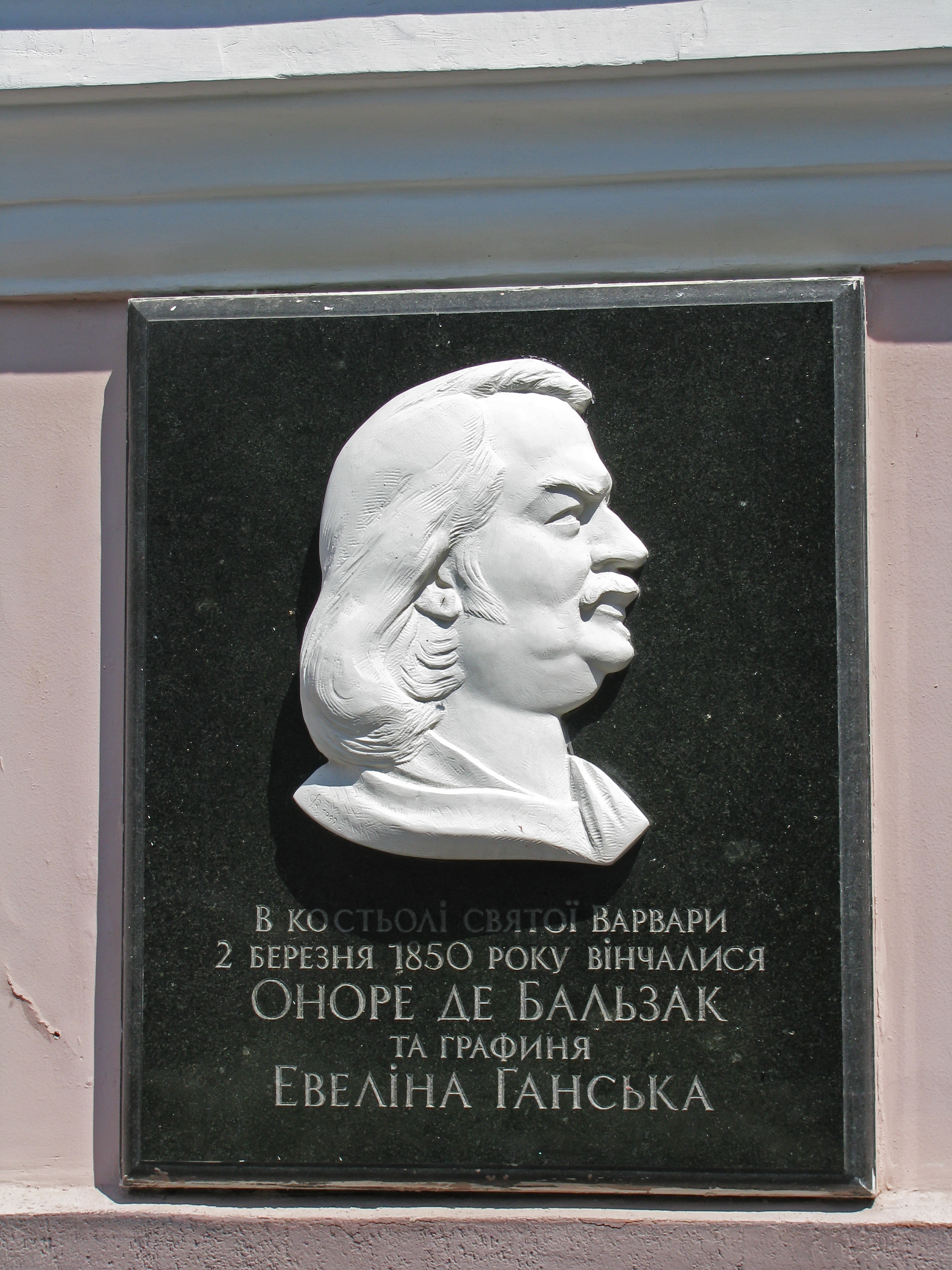
Balzac plaque

The Church of Saint Barbara, Berdychiv (Ukrainian: Костел Свято́ї Варва́ри, romanized: Kostel Sviatoyi Varvary), usually known as St Barbara's Catholic Church, is an urban Catholic parish church in the City of Berdychiv, now in Ukraine and formerly part of the Russias.

It was founded in the mid-18th century on the site of an earlier Polish Carmelite monastery.

== History ==
Dedicated to Saint Barbara, its name preserves the memory of an earlier local Carmelite monastery founded in 1630.

St Barbara's Church is regarded as a Ukrainian national architectural monument, being one of the most recognizable buildings in Berdychiv. The church was first built on its present site in 1759 by Countess Barbara Tyszkiewicz, daughter and heiress of a wealthy Lithuanian magnate whose dowry included Berdychiv. She dedicated the newly built basilica to her patron saint, Saint Barbara. Later, under Tsarist Russian-rule, the original wooden structure was demolished being replaced by an elegant stone edifice which was completed in 1826.

St Barbara's Church has attracted a number of distinguished people throughout its history, in view of the Polish state's staunch adherence to the Catholic faith.

In the 1820s a young and then-unknown Polish composer, Frederic Chopin, was resident in the then-Russian banking capital of Berdychiv. Having been taught to play string instruments by a Czech music professor, he set about supervising the installation of St Barbara's original pipe organ; this church organ, which the great Chopin played, was destroyed by the Communists in the 20th century.

Further fame was brought to Berdychiv's main catholic church by the celebrated marriage of French author Honoré de Balzac to his Polish aristocratic bride and landowner Countess Ewelina Hańska in 1850. Subsequently, the eminent Anglo-Polish writer, Joseph Conrad, was baptized at the basilica in 1857.

All churches throughout Russia were suppressed by the Government of the Union of Soviet Socialist Republics with Berdychiv's basilica being no exception; it was later converted into a People's Sports College for Children.

St. Barbara's Church was reconsecrated by the Catholic Church, in 1993, to serve again as a place of worship.

== See also ==
- Berdychiv
- Polish–Lithuanian Commonwealth
- Roman Catholicism in Ukraine
