= Bishop of Kyiv (Roman Catholic) =

List of Catholic bishops of Kyiv

This is a list of Roman Catholic bishops of Kyiv. For Greek Catholic bishops of Kyiv, see List of Major Archbishops of Kyiv-Halych.

Roman Catholic bishops of Kyiv diocese include:

- 1320–1334 Henryk, missionary bishop
- 1350–1378 Jakub, missionary bishop
- 1378–1383 Mikołaj, missionary bishop
- Borzysław 1375–1420, missionary bishop
- 1405–1410 Filip
- 1410–1429 Michał Trestka
- 1430 Stanisław z Buzowa
- 1431-? Stanisław Martini
- Andrzej d. 1434
- Jan 1421–1466
- 1449–1473 Klemens 1423–1473
- 1477–1483 Jan
- 1487–1494 Michał
- 1520–1524 Jan Filipowicz 1480–1537
- 1526–1531 Mikołaj Wieżgajło
- 1532–1533 Jerzy Talat
- 1534–1536 Franciszek 1506–1551
- Jan Andruszewicz 1515–1570
- 1564–1572 Mikołaj Pac 1527–1585
- 1592–1598 Józef Wereszczyński 1592–1598
- 1599–1618 Krzysztof Kazimierski 1572–1618
- 1619–1633 Bogusław Radoszewski 1577–1633
- 1633–1635 Andrzej Szołdrski 1633–1635
- 1646–1653 Stanisław Zaremba
- 1655–1656 Jan Leszczyński
- 1656–1677 Tomasz Ujejski
- 1679–1682 Jan Stanisław Witwicki
- 1683–1692 Andrzej Chryzostom Załuski 1650–1711
- Jarosław Sokołowski 1656–1701
- 1697–1699 Mikołaj Święcicki
- 1700–1711 Jan Paweł Sariusz-Gomoliński 1667–1711
- 1715–1718 Walenty Maciej Arcemberski 1674–1717
- 1718–1723 Jan Joachim Tarło
- 1723–1756 Jan Samuel Ożga d. 1756
- 1756–1759 Kajetan Sołtyk 1715–1788
- 1759–1774 Józef Andrzej Załuski 1702–1774
- 1774–1784 Ignacy Franciszek Ossoliński 1730–1784
- 1784–1798 Kasper Cieciszowski 1745–1831

== Bishops of Kyiv-Zhytomyr ==
- Jan Purwiński (1991–2011);
- Petro Malchuk (2011–2016);
- Vitaliy Skomarovskyi (apostolic administrator, 2016–2017);
- Vitaliy Kryvytskyi (since 2017).

Notes:

- the above dates are birth-death dates, not office terms.
- Kyiv diocese was created in 1397; in 1798 it was merged with Lutsk diocese forming the Zhytomyr diocese which in 1991 became the diocese of Kyiv-Zhytomyr

== See also ==
- Bishop of Kyiv (disambiguation)
- Ukrainian Catholic Archeparchy of Kyiv
