= Serhii Kippa =

Ukrainian Roman Catholic bishop (born 1978)

The Reverend Serhii Kippa O.F.M.Cap.
- Auxiliary Bishop of Kyiv-Zhytomyr
- Church: Roman Catholic Church
- Appointed: 4 September 2026
- Other post: Titular Bishop of Marazanae (since 2026)
- Previous post: Superior of the Custody of the Capuchin Friars Minor of Ukraine (2022–2026)

Orders
- Ordination: 22 May 2010
- Consecration: 3 October 2026 by Vitaliy Kryvytskyi

Personal details
- Born: 12 December 1978 (age 47) Voznesensk, Mykolaiv Oblast, Ukrainian SSR, Soviet Union
- Education: Kyiv National Linguistic University; Seminary of the Order of Friars Minor, Kalwaria Zebrzydowska; Seminary of the Capuchin Friars Minor, Kraków
- Motto: Pax nostra
- Coat of arms

Serhii Kippa, O.F.M.Cap. (born 12 December 1978) is a Ukrainian Roman Catholic prelate. On 4 September 2026, Pope Leo XIV appointed him auxiliary bishop of the Diocese of Kyiv-Zhytomyr and assigned him the titular see of Marazanae. At the time of his appointment, Kippa was superior of the Custody of the Capuchin Friars Minor of Ukraine.

== Early life and education ==
Kippa was born on 12 December 1978 in Voznesensk, in Mykolaiv Oblast, Ukraine, then part of the Ukrainian Soviet Socialist Republic. He studied Turkish at the Kyiv National Linguistic University from 1996 to 2001.

In 2001, Kippa began his postulancy and subsequently his novitiate in the Order of Friars Minor. In 2005, he transferred to the Order of Friars Minor Capuchin, in which he made his perpetual vows in 2009.

He received religious and philosophical-theological formation at the Seminary of the Order of Friars Minor in Kalwaria Zebrzydowska, Poland, from 2003 to 2005, and subsequently at the Seminary of the Capuchin Friars Minor in Kraków from 2006 to 2010. He obtained a master's degree in theology from the latter institution.

== Priesthood ==
Kippa was ordained a deacon on 18 October 2009 and a priest on 22 May 2010. From 2010 to 2016, he was responsible for vocations ministry in various locations in Ukraine and served as a master of novices. From 2016 to 2018, he was guardian of the Capuchin Friars Minor community in Starokostiantyniv. From 2018 to 2022, he served as parish priest of the parish of the Blessed Virgin Mary in Kyiv.

In 2022, Kippa became superior of the Custody of the Capuchin Friars Minor of Ukraine. He was re-elected to a second term in 2025. His election as custodian was also recorded by the Ukrainian Capuchin Custody following its VII Chapter in Starokostiantyniv in October 2022.

== Episcopacy ==
On 4 September 2026, Pope Leo XIV appointed Kippa auxiliary bishop of the Diocese of Kyiv-Zhytomyr and assigned him the titular see of Marazanae. The appointment was announced by the Holy See together with Kippa's biographical details and was subsequently reported by the Diocese of Kyiv-Zhytomyr. He is scheduled to receive episcopal consecration on 3 October 2026 at St. Oleksandr Co-Cathedral in Kyiv.

In an interview with Vatican News following the announcement, Kippa described his appointment as an unexpected call to a new form of service and spoke about the mission of an auxiliary bishop during the Russian invasion of Ukraine. He emphasized the role of peace, reconciliation and service in his new ministry.

The Diocese of Kyiv-Zhytomyr stated that Kippa speaks Ukrainian, Russian, Polish, English and Turkish.
