= Catholic Church in Ukraine =

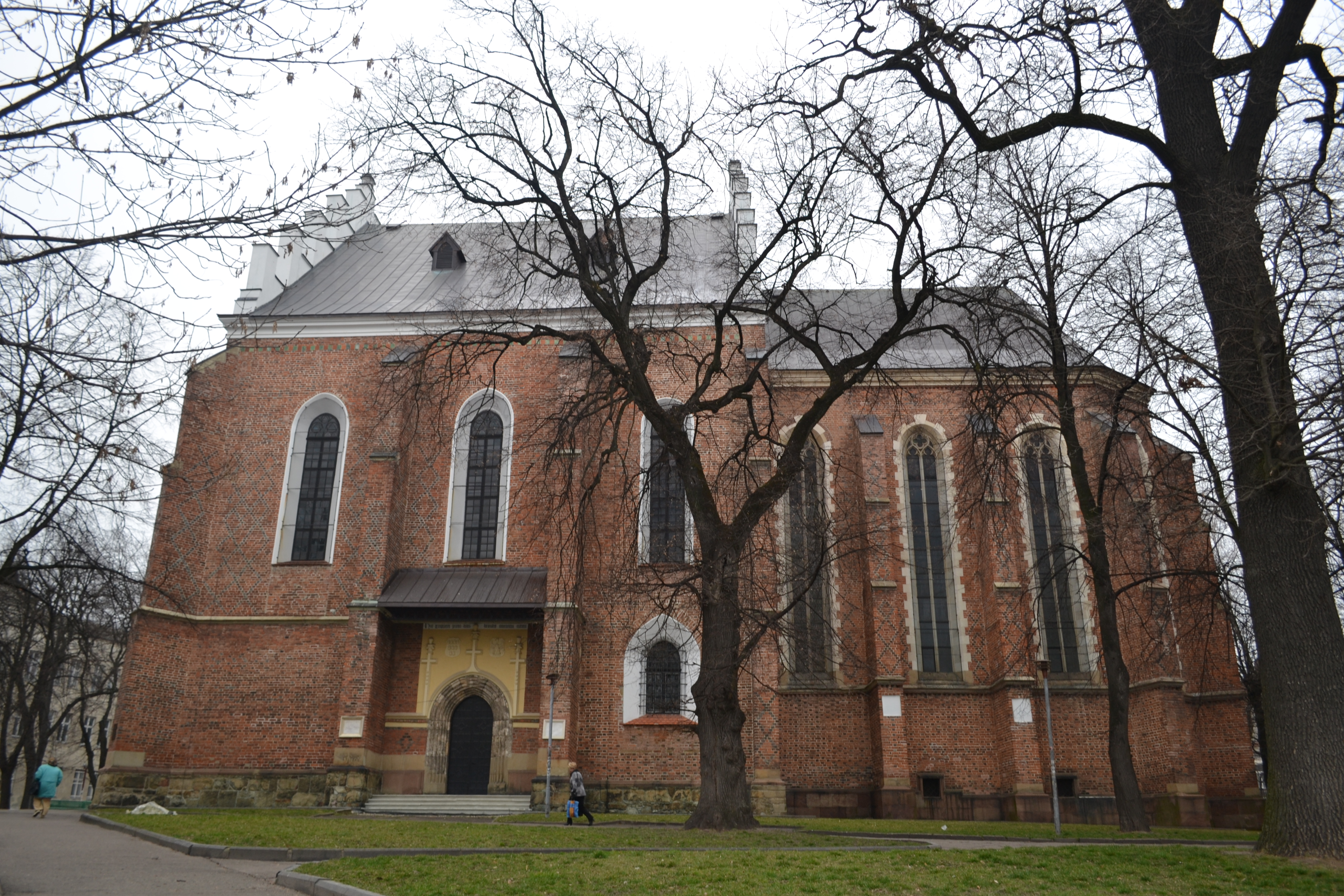
- 14th-century St Bartholomew Catholic Church, Drohobych
- Type: National polity
- Classification: Catholic Church
- Orientation: European
- Polity: Episcopal
- Pope: Leo XIV
- Major Archbishop (UGCC): Sviatoslav Shevchuk
- Archbishop (Latin): Mieczysław Mokrzycki
- Bishop (RGCC): Nil Lushchak (Apostolic administrator)
- Region: Ukraine
- Language: Church Slavonic, Ukrainian

The Catholic Church in Ukraine (Latin: Ecclesia Catholica in Ucraina; Ukrainian: Католицька церква в Україні, romanized: Katolytska tserkva v Ukraini) is part of the worldwide Catholic Church, under the spiritual leadership of the Pope in Rome. Catholics make up 13-14% of the population of Ukraine. The majority of Catholics (80%) in Ukraine belong to the Ukrainian Greek Catholic Church and Ruthenian Greek Catholic Church (Greek Catholic Eparchy of Mukachevo), while significant numbers of others belong to the Latin Church and Armenian Catholic Church.

== History and data ==
The Catholic Church in Ukraine consists of members of the Ukrainian Greek Catholic Church as well as the Latin Church, Greek Catholic Eparchy of Mukachevo, and the Armenian Catholic Church.

The majority of Ukrainian Catholics belong to the Ukrainian Greek Catholic Church. The Latin Church in the territories of modern Ukraine has been strongly associated with Poland and Poles, but the church has emphasized a Ukrainian identity since the nation's independence from the Soviet Union.

The history of the Catholic Church in modern Ukraine starts as early as the 10th century when Christianity in Ruthenia was established as a state religion in 988 taking place before the East–West Schism. While records of Christians and Christian temples in the Medieval state predate the date. In mid-10th century, Kyiv was visited by a mission that was led by bishop Adalbert of Magdeburg out of Trier Monastery. Following the schism, the Ruthenian Church which was brought to Kyiv by the Byzantine Greeks ended up among Eastern Orthodox Churches. After annexation of the Kingdom of Ruthenia by the Kingdom of Poland in course of the Galicia–Volhynia Wars in Lviv was established the Roman Catholic Archdiocese of Lviv in the 14th century. In mid-15th century Metropolitan of Kyiv Isidore attempted to unite the Ruthenian Church with the Catholic world by attending the Council of Florence.

Due to the conflict with the Grand Duchy of Moscow, in 1458 the Ecumenical Patriarch of Constantinople Isidore II reorganized the Ruthenian Church moving its metropolitan see to Vilnius. Until 1480, the metropolitan see of the Church was held by a metropolitan bishop appointed by the Pope including Gregory the Bulgarian and Misail Pstruch. In 1595, there was signed the Union of Brest which officially united the Ruthenian Church with the Catholic Church accomplishing the intent of Metropolitan Isidore. Following partitions of Poland, in 1839 in Polotsk pressured by the Russian government all the bishops of the Ruthenian Uniate Church signed the union with the Russian Orthodox Church, while dioceses of Eastern rite that became part of the Kingdom of Galicia and Lodomeria in the Austrian Empire were reorganized as Greek-Catholic Church.

In 1630, a bishop of Armenian Apostolic Church Mikołaj Torosowicz also signed a union with the Catholic Church establishing Armenian Catholic diocese of Lwow.

In 1646, another Eastern Orthodox diocese of Mukachevo signed the Union of Uzhhorod and for sometime was guided by the Archbishop of Eger in Hungary.

In 2001, Ukraine was visited by Pope John Paul II, who held official and informal meetings in Kyiv and Lviv. Communities from both the Ukrainian Greek Catholic Church and the Latin Church warmly greeted the Pope. Additionally, Non-Catholic religious communities publicly expressed a hope that the visit would encourage a spiritual and cultural renewal in the country which has been troubled by economic and social problems.

Caritas Ukraine is the charity of the Greek Catholic Church in Ukraine, while Caritas-Spes Ukraine is the official charity organisation of the Roman Catholic Church in Ukraine. Both organisations have become major humanitarian actors, providing aid to millions of people following the Russian invasion of Ukraine in 2022.

Among the Catholics of Ukraine there are Ukrainians, Poles, Czechs, Hungarians, Filipinos and other peoples.

== Ukrainian Greek Catholic Church ==
The Ukrainian Greek Catholic Church is a Byzantine Rite Eastern Catholic Church in full communion with the Holy See. The ordinary (or hierarch) of the church holds the title of Major Archbishop of Kyiv-Halych and All Ruthenia, though the hierarchs and faithful of the church have acclaimed their ordinary as "Patriarch" and have requested Papal recognition of, and elevation to, this title. Major archbishop is a unique title within the Catholic Church that was introduced in 1963 as part of political compromise. Since March 2011, the head of the church is Major Archbishop Sviatoslav Shevchuk.

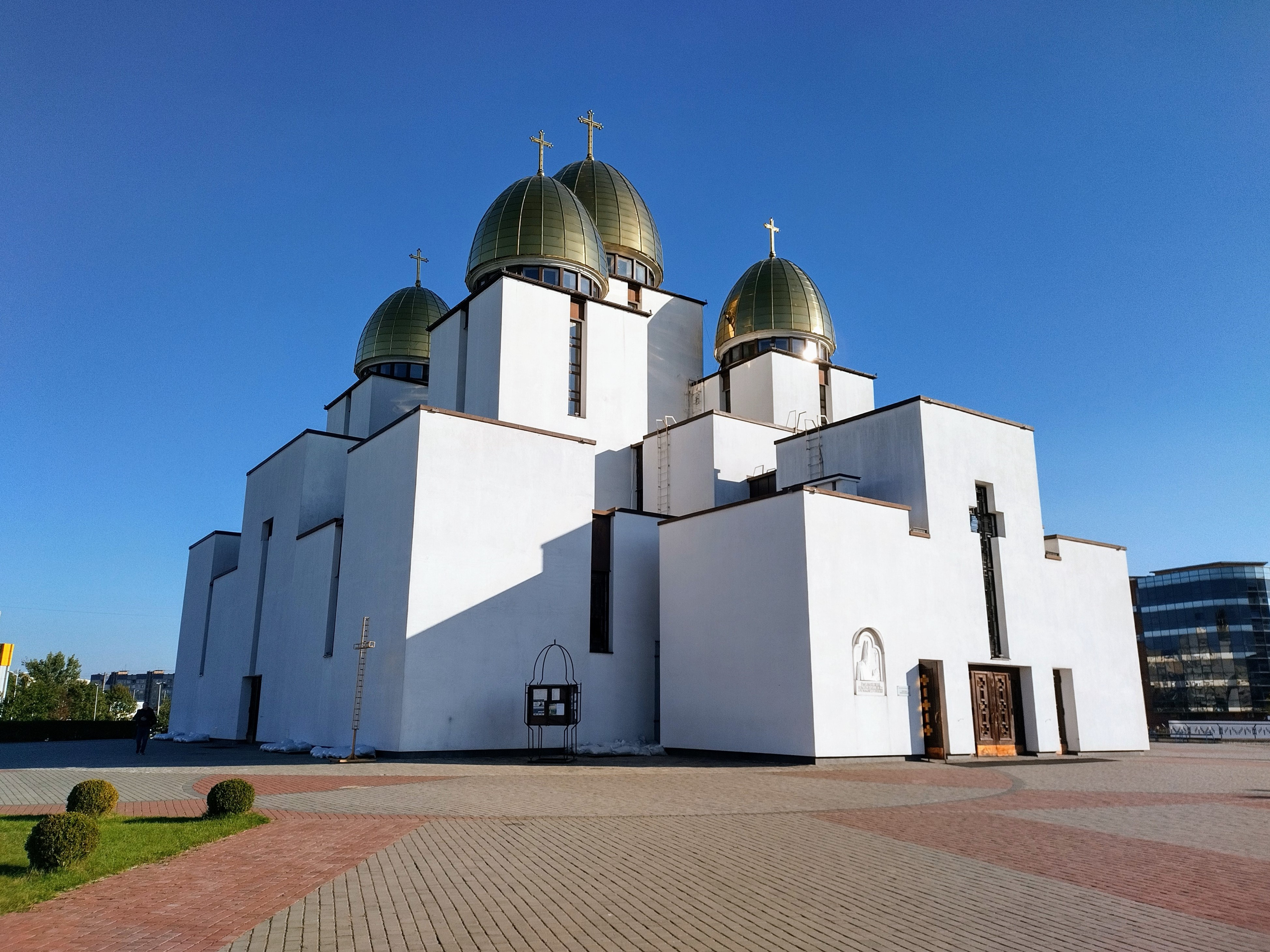
Church of the Nativity of the Blessed Virgin Mary in Lviv

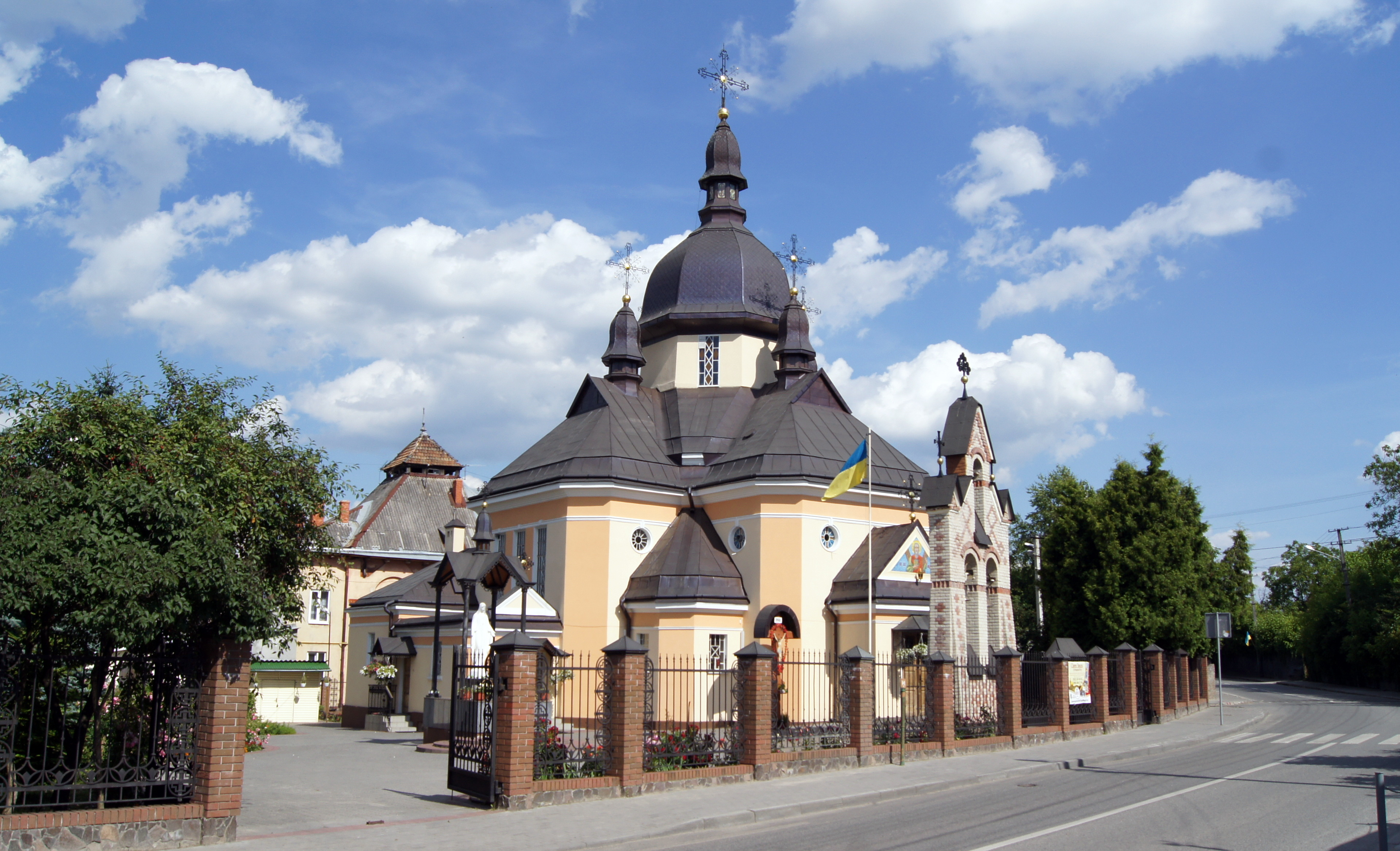
St. Andrew's Church in Lviv

== Latin Catholic Church in Ukraine ==
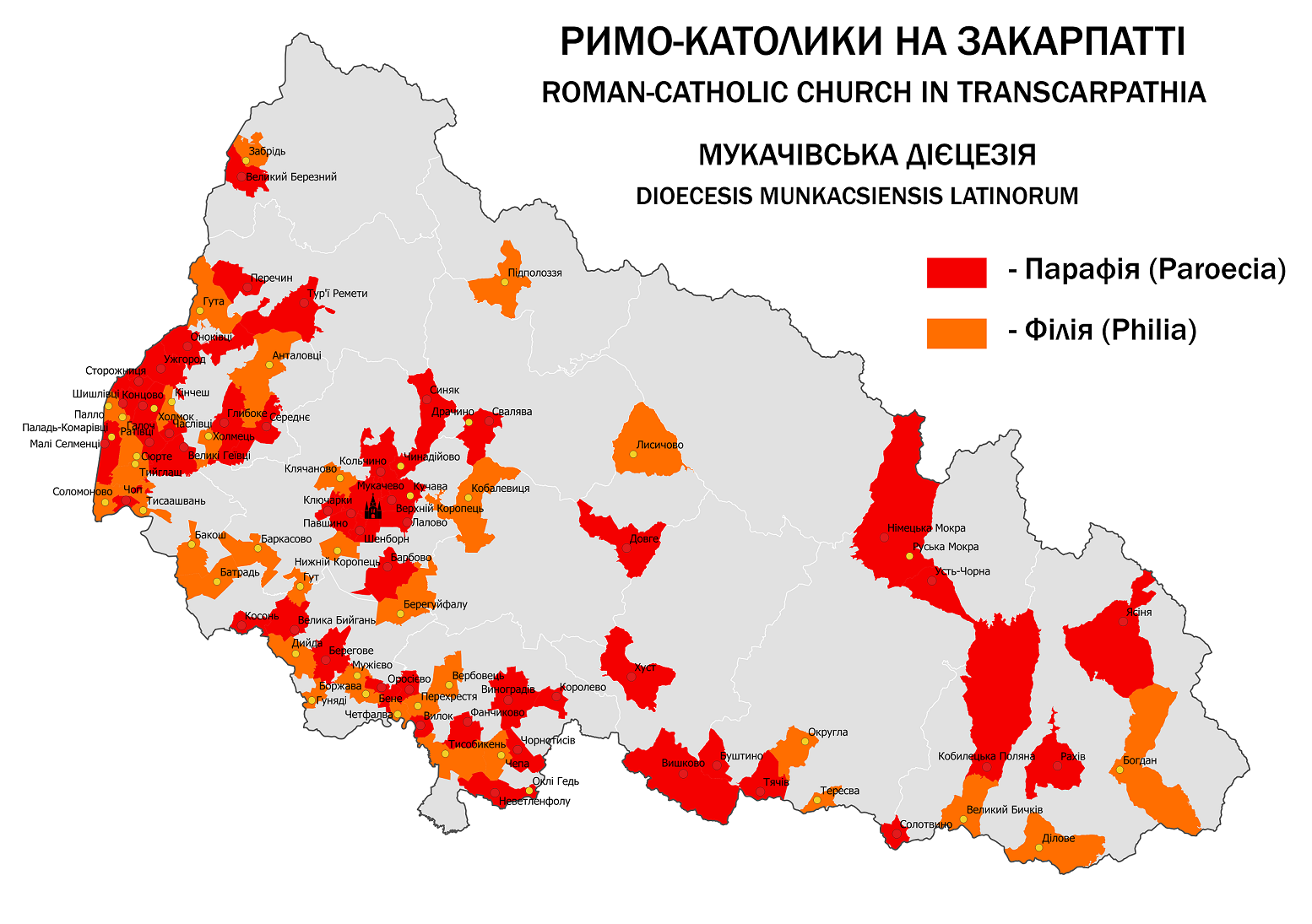
Roman-Catholic parish in Transcarpathia region of Ukraine

The present Archbishop for the Latins is Mieczysław Mokrzycki (ordained on 29 September 2007 by Pope Benedict XVI).

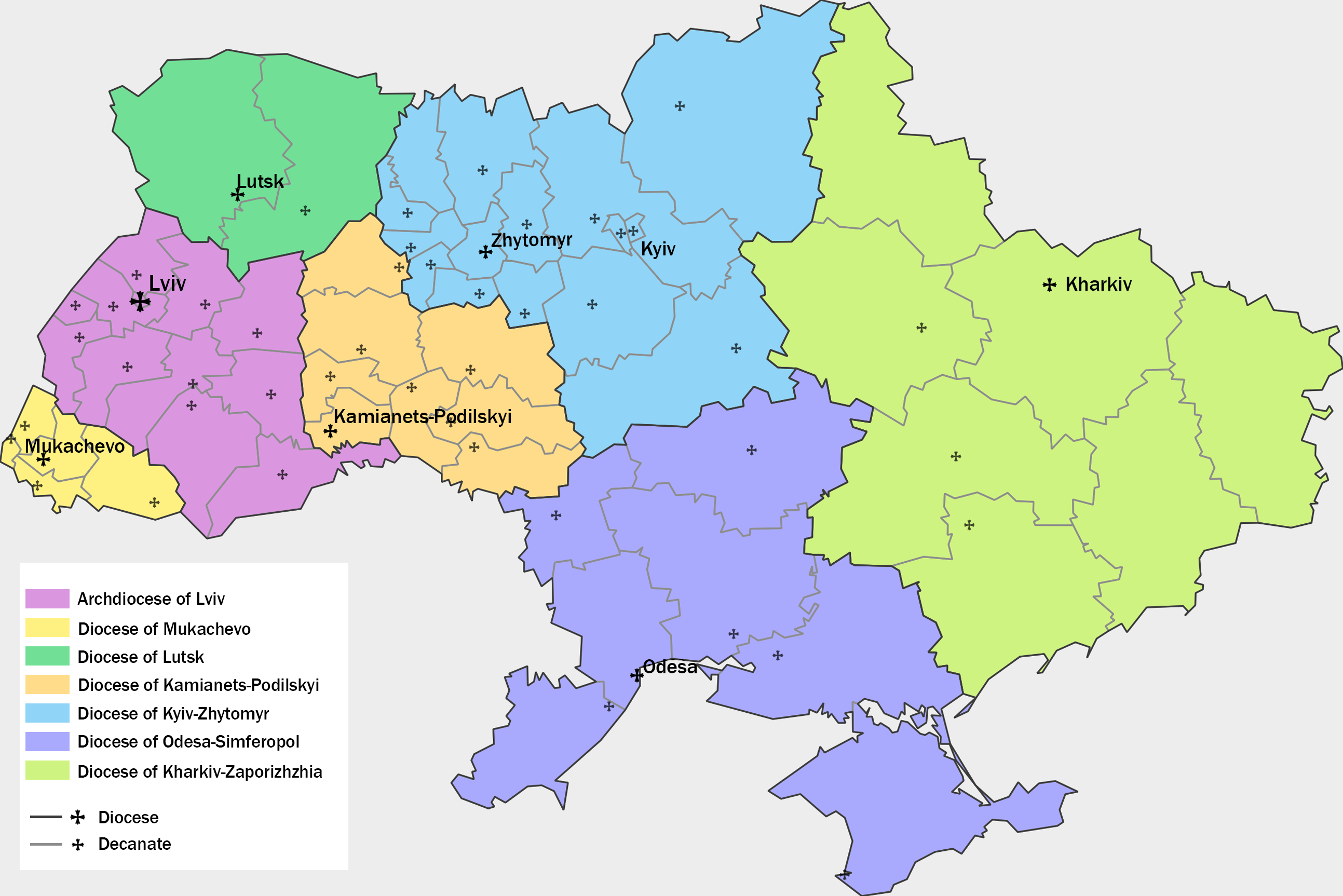
Roman Catholic Diocese and Decanates in Ukraine

The Latin Church in Ukraine had in 2007; 905 communities, 88 monasteries, 656 monks and nuns, 527 priests, 713 churches (74 under construction), 39 missions, 8 educational institutions, 551 Sunday schools, 14 periodical editions.

=== Latin Catholic cathedrals in Ukraine ===
- Sts. Peter and Paul Cathedral, in Kamyanets-Podilsky
- Cathedral of the Assumption of the Blessed Virgin Mary in Kharkiv
- Merciful Father Co-Cathedral, in Zaporizhzhia
- Saint Sophia Cathedral, in Zhytomyr
- St. Alexander Co-Cathedral, in Kyiv
- Sts. Peter and Paul Cathedral, in Lutsk
- Archcathedral Basilica of the Assumption of the Blessed Virgin Mary, in Lviv
- Cathedral of St. Martin of Tours, in Mukacheve
- Assumption of the Blessed Virgin Mary Cathedral, in Odesa.
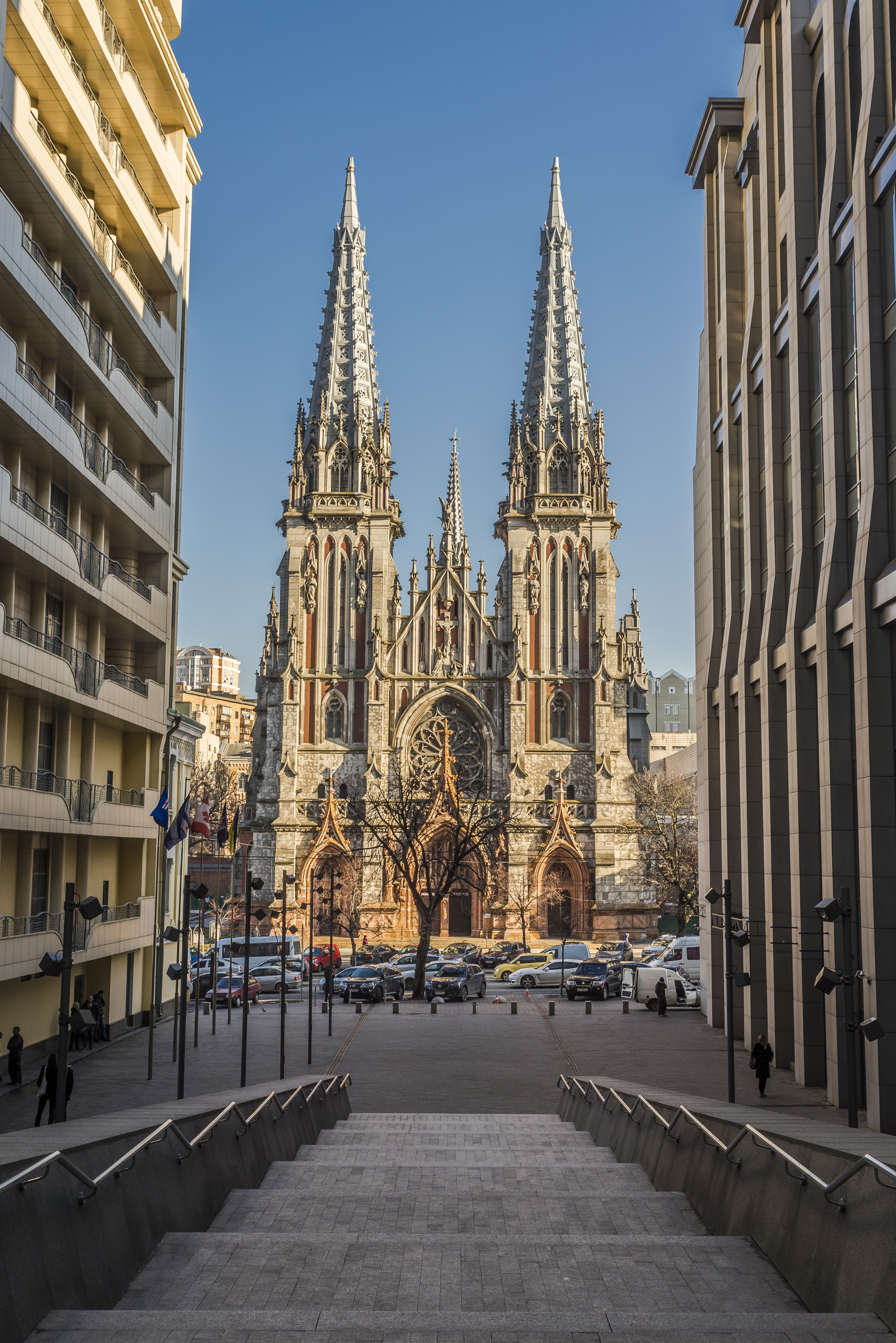
St. Nicholas Roman Catholic church in Kyiv.

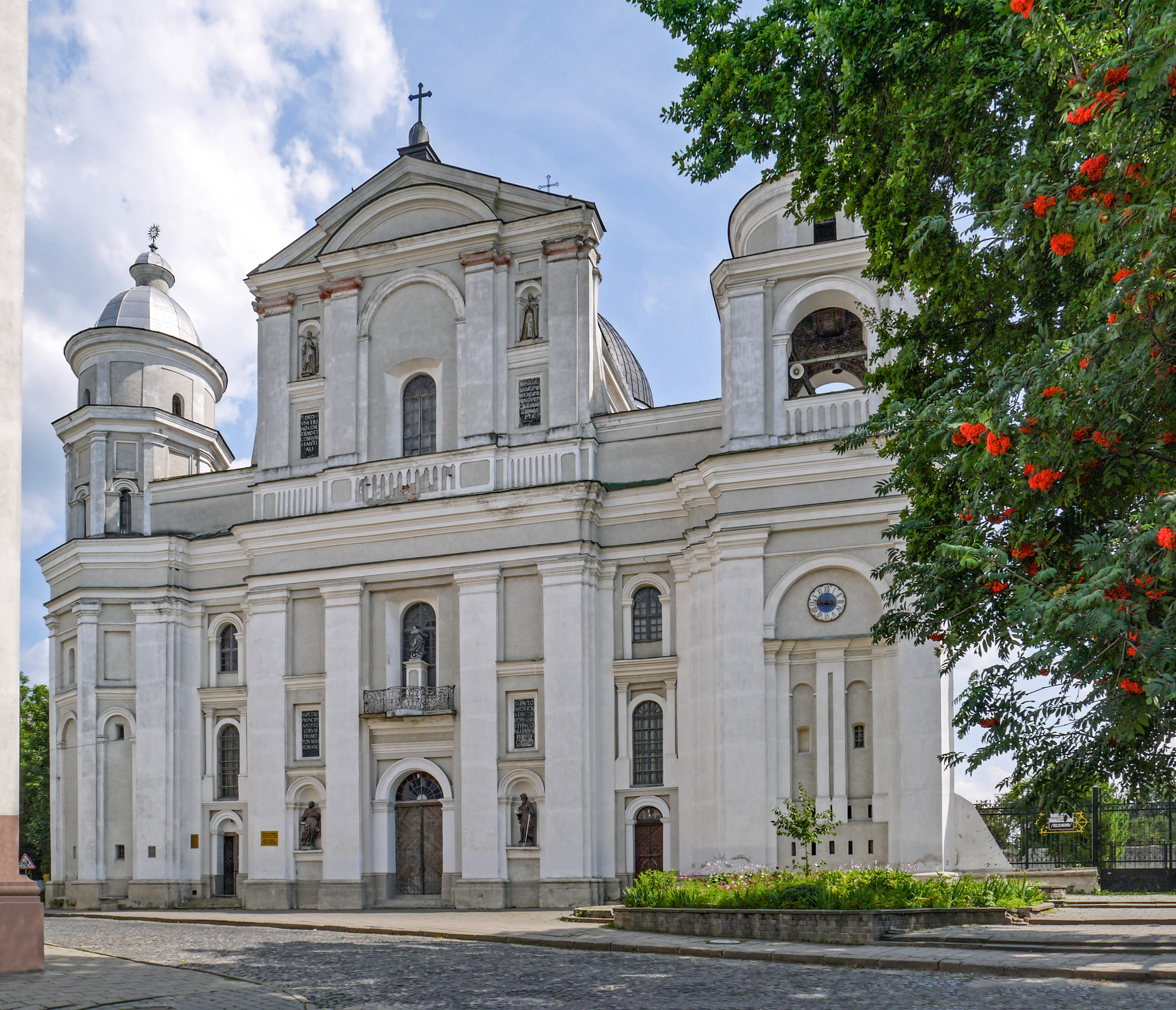
Saint Peter and Paul Cathedral, Lutsk

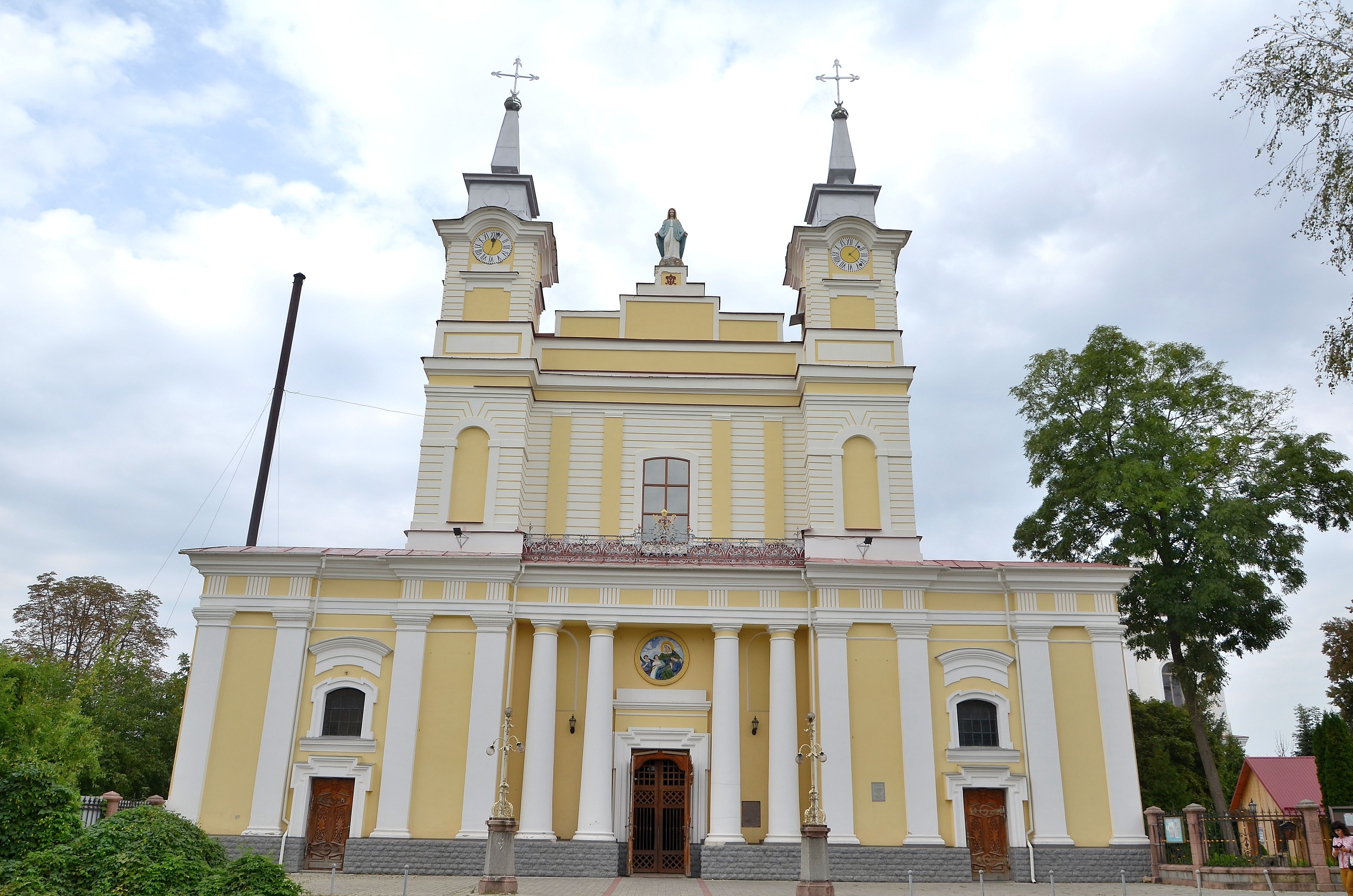
Saint Sophia Cathedral, Zhytomyr

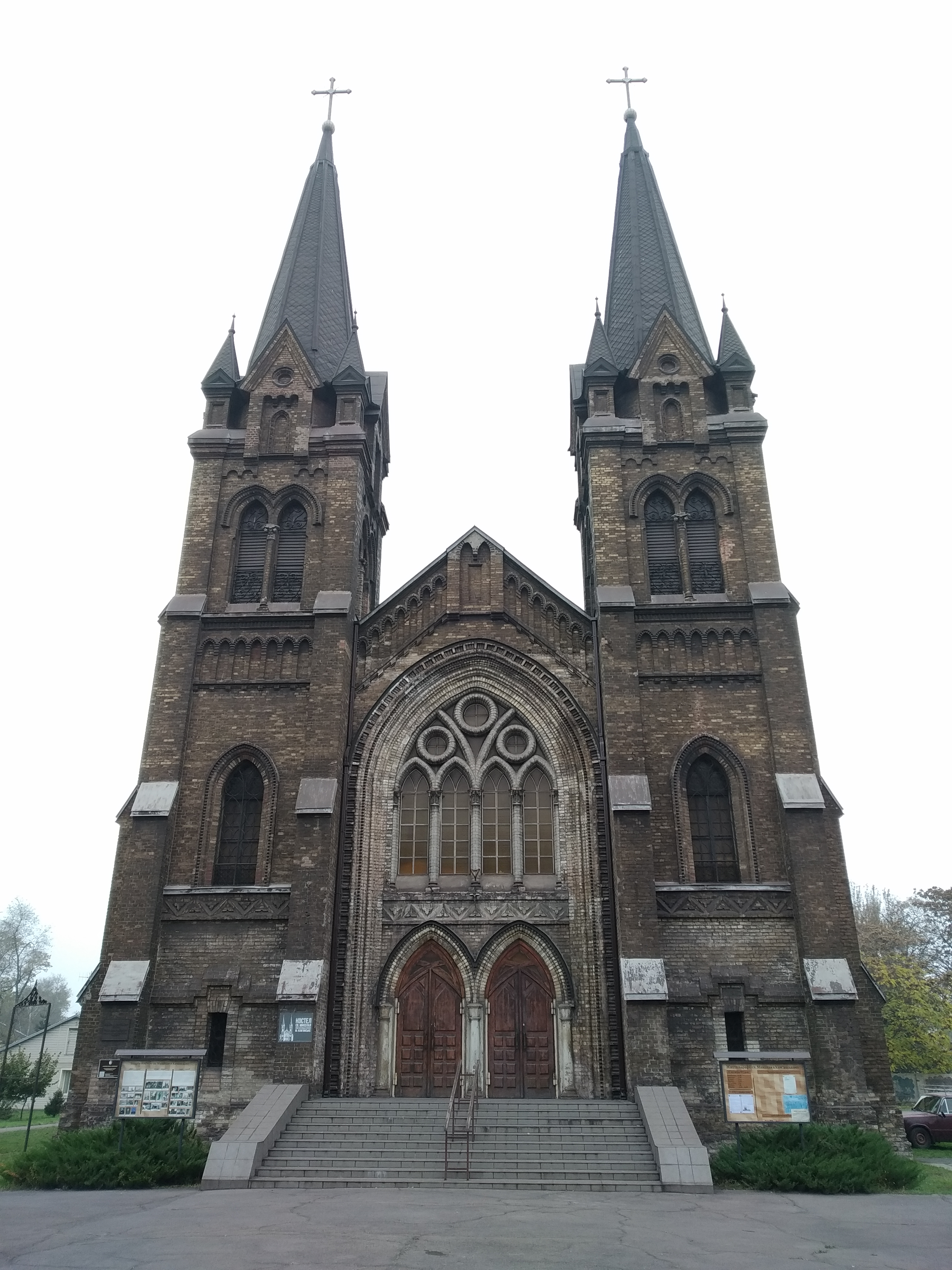
Church of St. Nicholas in the city of Kamianske

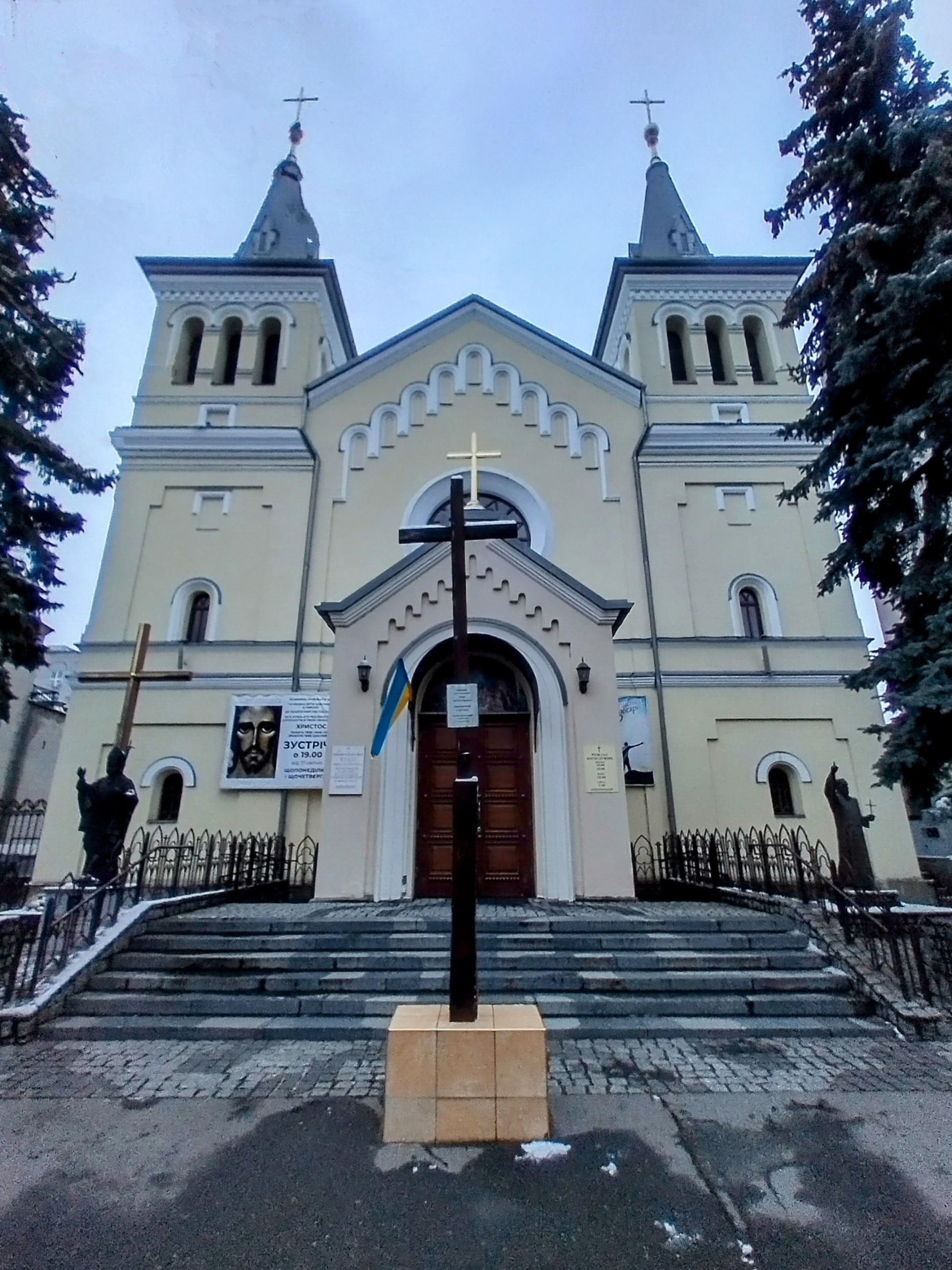
St. Joseph's Church in Dnipro

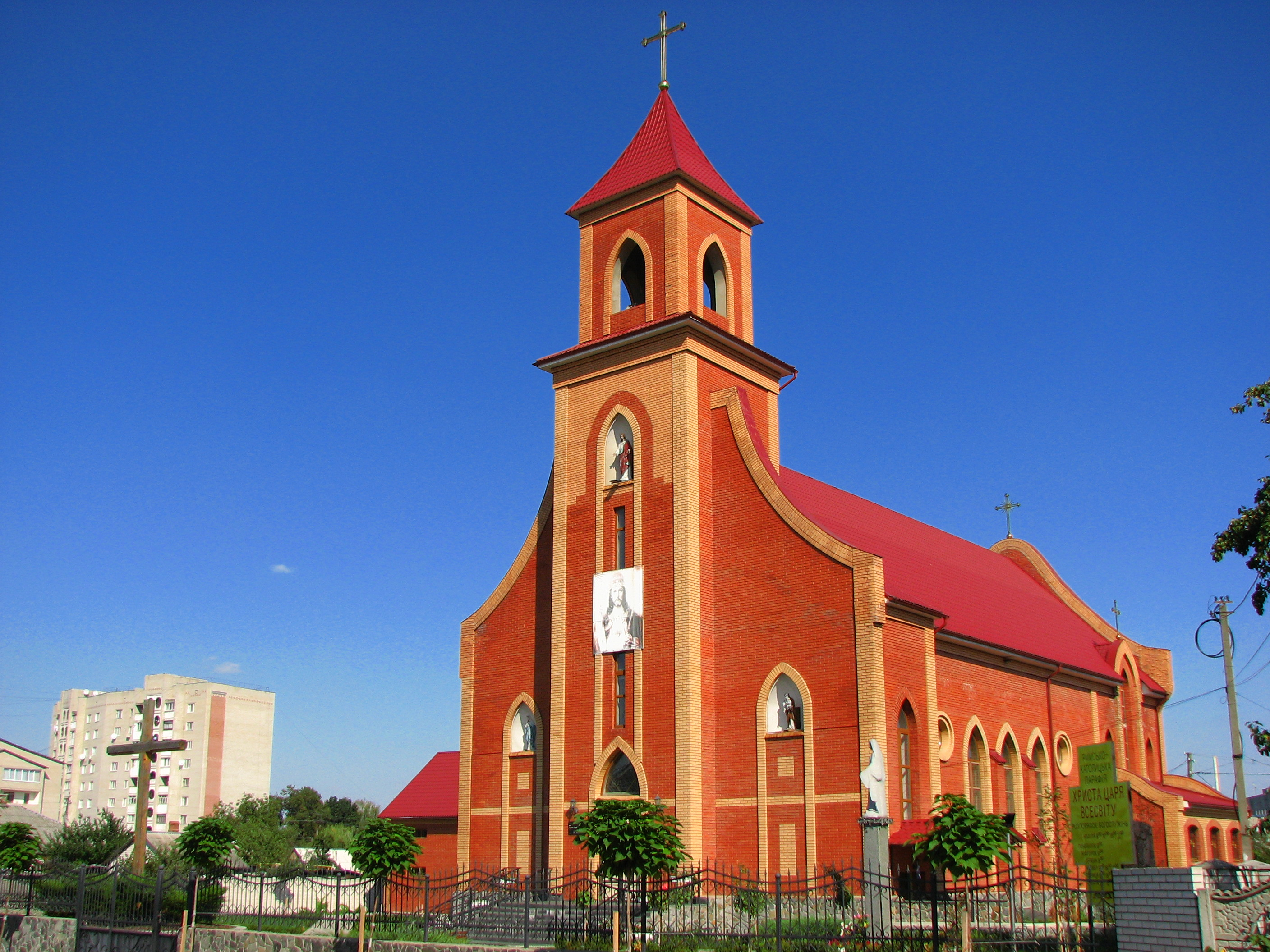
Church of Christ the King of the Universe in the city of Zvyahel

== Hierarchy ==
See: List of Catholic dioceses in Ukraine

== See also ==
- Roman Catholic Archdiocese of Lviv
- Superior Institute of Religious Sciences of St. Thomas Aquinas
- Ukrainian Catholic University
- Granting of autocephaly to the Orthodox Church of Ukraine
