= Oleksandr Yazlovetskiy =

Ukrainian Roman Catholic prelate

- Titular Bishop of Tulana, Auxiliary Bishop of Roman Catholic Diocese of Kyiv-Zhytomyr
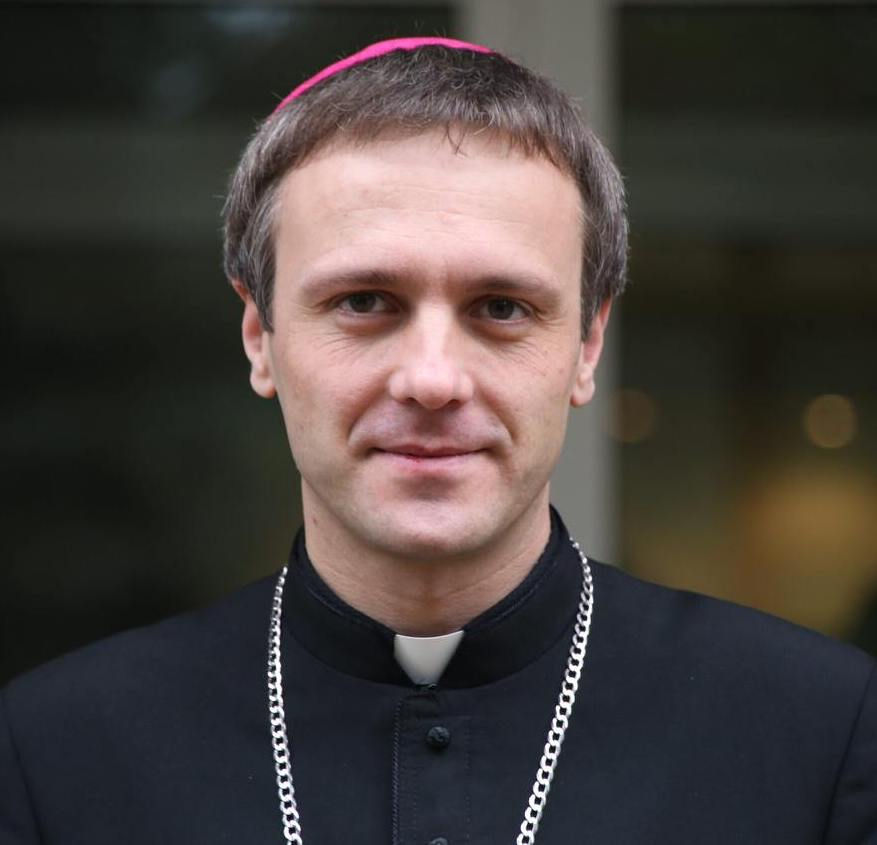
- Church: Roman Catholic Church
- Appointed: 18 September 2019
- Successor: Incumbent
- Other post: Rector of the Major Seminary in Horodok (2014–2018)

Orders
- Ordination: 26 June 2004 (Priest) by Leon Dubrawski
- Consecration: 9 November 2019 (Bishop) by Claudio Gugerotti

Personal details
- Born: Oleksandr Yazlovetskiy; 2 March 1979 (age 46) Hybalivka, Vinnytsia Oblast, Ukrainian SSR
- Motto: Primus servus Dei
- Coat of arms

Bishop Oleksandr Yazlovetskiy or Yazlovetskyi (Ukrainian: Олександр Язловецький; pol. Aleksander Jazłowiecki born 2 March 1979) is a Ukrainian Roman Catholic prelate who serves as an Auxiliary bishop of the Kyiv–Zhytomyr and the Titular Bishop of Tulana since 18 September 2019.

He is also the president of the charity and humanitarian organisation Caritas-Spes.

== Life ==
Bishop Yazlovetskiy was born in the Roman Catholic family with a Ukrainian father and a Polish mother in the Sharhorod Raion (Note: For these reasons sometimes Sharhorod is wrongly indicated as his birth place.) of the Vinnytsia Oblast. After graduation of the school education in his native village and professional-technical college, he joined the Major Theological Seminary in Horodok in 1996; and was ordained as priest on 26 June 2004, for the Roman Catholic Diocese of Kamyanets-Podilskyi, after completed his philosophical and theological study. After the two years of pastoral and formative works, he continued studies at the Pontifical Lateran University in Rome, Italy, with Doctor of Canon Law degree in 2012.

Fr. Yazlovetskiy returned to Ukraine in 2013 and began to work in the educational camp and during 2014–2018 served as a Rector of the Major Theological Roman Catholic Seminary in Horodok. From 2018 he has been a Chancellor of the Roman Catholic Diocese of Kyiv-Zhytomyr.

On 18 September 2019 he was appointed by the Pope Francis as the Auxiliary Bishop of the Kyiv–Zhytomyr. On 9 November 2019 he was consecrated as bishop in the Co-Cathedral of St. Alexander in Kyiv.

== Notes ==
Catholic Church titles
Preceded by Otacílio Ferreira de Lacerda	Titular Bishop of Tulana; 2019–	Succeeded by Incumbent
Educational offices
Preceded by Vyacheslav Hrumnytskyi	Rector of Major Theological Seminary in Horodok; 2014—2018	Succeeded by Viktor Bilous
