= Stanisław Zaremba =

Stanisław Zaremba may refer to:

- Stanisław Zaremba (bishop of Kyiv) (?–1648), writer, abbot, Cistercian, bishop of Kyiv
- Stanisław Zaremba (mathematician) (1863–1942)
