= Caritas-Spes =

Ukrainian Catholic humanitarian organisation

- Карітас-Спес
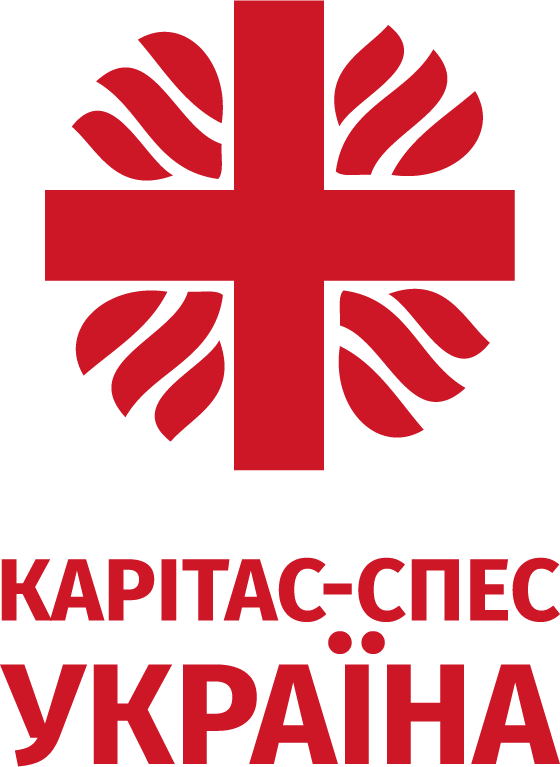
- Established: May 1996; 30 years ago (registered)
- Founders: Conference of Roman Catholic Bishops in Ukraine
- Type: Nonprofit
- VAT ID no.: 21664879
- Purpose: social justice
- Location: Kyiv, Ukraine
- Coordinates: 50.4535°N 30.5215°E
- Origins: Catholic Social Teaching
- Region served: Ukraine
- Services: social services, humanitarian relief
- Official language: Ukrainian, English
- President: Bishop Oleksandr Yazlovetskiy
- Director: Rev. Vyacheslav Grynevych
- Affiliations: Caritas Europa, Caritas Internationalis
- Revenue: 948,636,388 UAH (2023)
- Expenses: 850,731,288 UAH (2023)
- Staff: 63 (national office) (2023)
- Website: caritas-spes.org/en

Caritas-Spes (Ukrainian: Карітас-Спес) or Caritas-Spes Ukraine (Ukrainian: Карітас-Спес Україна) is a not-for-profit social welfare and humanitarian relief organisation in Ukraine. It is a service of the Roman Catholic Church in Ukraine.

It is not to be confused with Caritas Ukraine, which is the aid organisation of the Ukrainian Greek Catholic Church. Both Caritas-Spes and Caritas Ukraine are member organisations of Caritas Europa and of Caritas Internationalis.

== History ==
The origins of Caritas-Spes date back to the late 1980s, during the decline of the communist regime. At this time, Ukrainian clergy were once again able to travel abroad. On one such trip to Poland, they observed the development of the Catholic Church and the activities of Caritas Poland. Inspired by this, a Ukrainian priest, Father Yuriy Nagorny, resolved to establish Catholic charitable initiatives in Ukraine. Despite significant challenges, he successfully registered a public organisation called "Caritas-Spes" in 1990. This organisation was neither a church body nor religious in nature, as the Catholic Church's structure in Ukraine had yet to be restored—a process that only began in 1991 with the appointment of bishops after an absence of over 80 years.

In 1992, Bishop Jan Purvinsky of the Zhytomyr Diocese was appointed to oversee Caritas of the Roman Catholic Church. Steps were taken to register Caritas organisations as religious entities accountable to bishops. However, administrative and legal obstacles complicated this process. During this period, charitable activities persisted through parish Caritas groups, managed by local priests, with Father Yuriy Nagorny continuing to lead the overall initiative. He worked to expand operations, collaborating with international partners such as Caritas Austria, Caritas France, and Caritas Netherlands.

Initially, Caritas primarily distributed shipments of humanitarian aid. However, due to issues with corruption and increasing legislative restrictions stemming from lingering communist-era mentalities, foreign benefactors began reducing their support. By 1995, all Caritas offices in Ukraine were re-registered as religious institutions, creating a new structure fully integrated into the Church. This transition culminated in 1996 with the official registration of the Religious Mission "Caritas-Spes" of the Roman Catholic Church. Nevertheless, legislative changes in the same year made it nearly impossible to receive humanitarian aid from abroad. As a result, activities such as sending children abroad for rehabilitation, particularly those affected by the Chernobyl disaster, became increasingly difficult. Despite these challenges, small groups of children continued to benefit from rehabilitation programmes in Ukraine, where Caritas-Spes rented sanatoriums and rest homes for their care.

Through donations from international benefactors, including Caritas organisations in Germany, Austria, and France, as well as the Catholic charity Renovabis, Caritas-Spes was able to expand its activities. Given the ongoing impact of the Chernobyl disaster, the organisation specialised in children's rehabilitation. By 1996, approximately 230 children underwent rehabilitation, with this number increasing to 700 in 1997 and 1,800 by 1999. Children attended charitable camps across the country.

In addition to children's rehabilitation, Caritas-Spes established over dozens of regional centres across Ukraine. These centres provided crucial support to the most vulnerable, operating charitable canteens and social centres. In May 1995, The Conference of the Roman Catholic Bishops in Ukraine officially founded Caritas-Spes as a Religious Mission. It was subsequently registered on 24 September 1996 by the State Committee for Religious Affairs, with Bishop Stanislav Shyrokoradiuk appointed as its head. Since then, its formal name has been the Religious Mission Caritas-Spes of the Roman Catholic Church in Ukraine.

In 1999, Caritas-Spes became a member of Caritas Europa and Caritas Internationalis, marking its integration into the global Caritas network.

The organisation has faced devastating losses during the Russian invasion of Ukraine. In April 2022, two Caritas-Spes workers were killed in a Russian attack on its Mariupol office. On the night of September 18–19, 2023, a Caritas-Spes warehouse in the Lviv area storing humanitarian aid was destroyed by Russian bombing, resulting in the loss of 300 tons of relief supplies. This attack lead to widespreak condemnation, including by the representative of the United Nations in Ukraine, Denise Brown.

== Structure ==
Caritas-Spes operates a national office in Kyiv and up to 50 local centres across Ukraine. These centres deliver support to individuals in need, offering services like soup kitchens, community centres, shelters, medical clinics, and rehabilitation programmes, without discrimination based on religion, race, or ethnicity.

== Work ==
From its inception, Caritas-Spes has focused on improving the lives of vulnerable children by sending them to health resorts in Ukraine or hospitals abroad. Before the Russian invasion of Ukraine in 2022, the organisation facilitated health improvement for approximately 3,000 children annually at its recreation centers in Jablunytsia (Ivano-Frankivsk Oblast), Berdiansk (Zaporizhia Oblast), Zarichany and Oleksandrivka (Zhytomyr Oblast), and Pnikut (Volyn Oblast). Additionally, Caritas-Spes operates more than 20 family-style homes for orphans and numerous daycare centers serving preschool and school-age children, including homeless children and those with disabilities.

Caritas-Spes also supports youth, senior citizens, individuals in need, addicts, and people living with HIV/AIDS. It creates employment opportunities in economically depressed areas of Ukraine through self-sustaining projects.

Since its founding, Caritas-Spes has evolved into a significant humanitarian actor, implementing large-scale projects. In the first six months following the Russian invasion of Ukraine alone, from February to July 2022, the organisation provided assistance to over 1.7 million people, including shelter, food, water, medicine, hygiene items, and targeted WASH programmes.

In 2023, Caritas-Spes supported 481,907 individuals in 23 regions of Ukraine.
