= Vitaliy Skomarovskyi =

Ukrainian Roman Catholic prelate

- Bishop of Lutsk
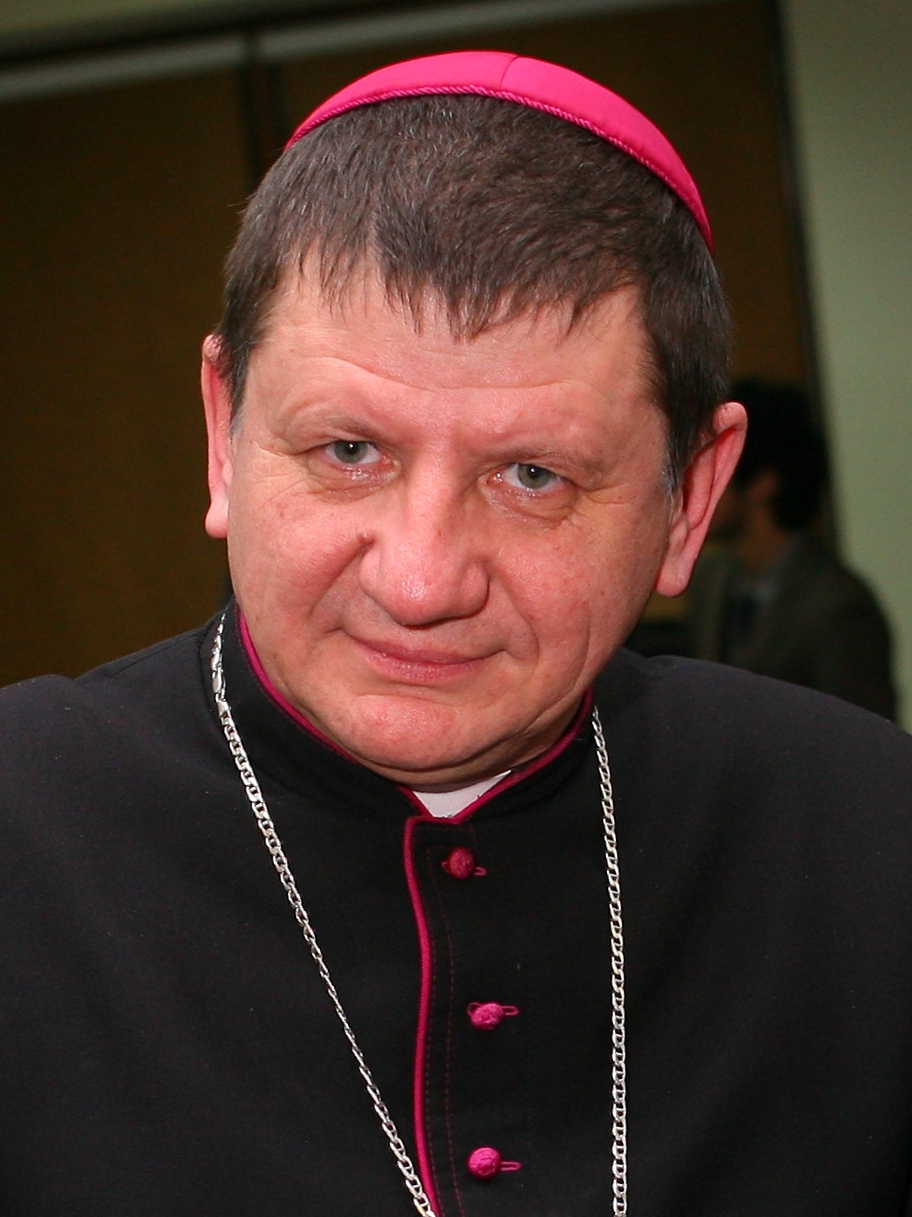
- Church: Roman Catholic Church
- Appointed: 12 April 2014
- Predecessor: Markijan Trofimiak

Orders
- Ordination: 27 May 1990 by Vilhelms Nukšs
- Consecration: 7 June 2003 by Marian Jaworski

Personal details
- Born: Vitaliy Skomarovskyi; 30 December 1963 (age 62) Berdychiv, Zhytomyr Oblast, Ukrainian SSR

Vitaliy Skomarovskyi (Ukrainian: Віталій Скомаровський, Polish: Witalij Skomarowski; born 30 December 1963 in Berdychiv, Zhytomyr Oblast, Ukrainian SSR) is a Ukrainian Roman Catholic prelate as the diocesan bishop of the Diocese of Lutsk since 12 April 2014. Previously he served as the titular bishop of Bencenna and auxiliary bishop of the Diocese of Kyiv-Zhytomyr since 7 April 2003 until 12 April 2014 and as an apostolic administrator of the same diocese from 31 May 2016 until 30 April 2017.

== Life ==
Bishop Skomarovskyi was born into a Polish Roman-Catholic family in Zhytomyr Oblast. After graduating from school in his native town and from medical college, he entered into compulsory service in the Soviet Army and subsequently joined the Major Theological Seminary in Riga, Latvia. He was ordained a priest on 27 May 1990, after completing his philosophical and theological studies.

After returning to Ukraine in 1990, Skomarovskyi served as the following: parish vicar in Berdychiv (1990–1991), bishop's secretary and parish vicar in Zhytomyr (1991–1992), parish priest in Sumy (1992–1995), diocesan chancellor (1995–1998) and rector of St. Sophia Cathedral in Zhytomyr (1998–2000). In 2000 he was appointed as vice-rector of the Major Theological Latin Seminary in Vorzel. He served as its rector from 2002 to 2011.

On 7 April 2003, he was appointed by Pope John Paul II as the auxiliary bishop of the Diocese of Kyiv-Zhytomyr and titular bishop of Bencenna. On 7 June 2003, he was consecrated bishop by Cardinal Marian Jaworski and other prelates of the Roman Catholic Church.

Catholic Church titles
Preceded by Markijan Trofimiak	Bishop of Lutsk; 2014–present	Incumbent
Preceded by Petro Herkulan Malchuk	Apostolic administrator of Kyiv–Zhytomyr; 2016–2017	Succeeded by Vitaliy Kryvytskyi
Preceded by Tomislav Koljatic Maroevic	Titular bishop of Bencenna; 2003–2014	Succeeded by Joy Alappat
