= Jan Purwinski =

Ukrainian prelate (1934–2021)

- Diocesan Bishop of Roman Catholic Diocese of Kyiv-Zhytomyr (until 25 November 1998 as the Diocesan Bishop of Zhytomyr)
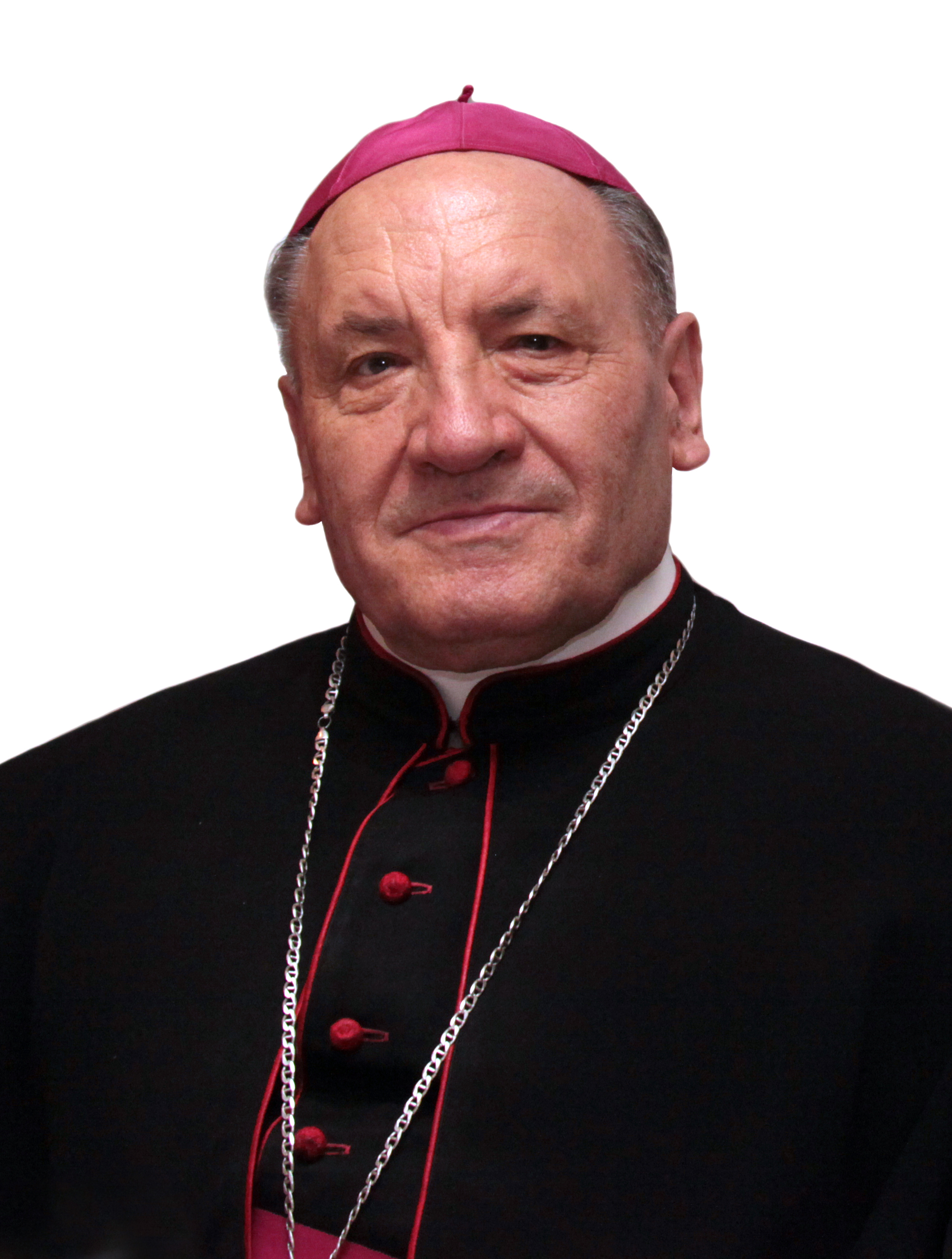
- Church: Roman Catholic Church
- Appointed: 16 January 1991
- Term ended: 15 June 2011
- Predecessor: Fr. Teofil Skalski (Ap. Administrator)
- Successor: Petro Malchuk

Orders
- Ordination: 13 April 1961 (Priest) by Petras Mazelis
- Consecration: 4 March 1991 (Bishop) by Francesco Colasuonno

Personal details
- Born: Jānis Purvinskis; 19 November 1934 Dolna, near Ilūkste, Latvia
- Died: 6 April 2021 (aged 86) Zhytomyr, Ukraine

Bishop Jan Purwinski or Yan Purvinskyi (Ukrainian: Ян Пурвінський; Polish: Jan Purwiński; Latvian: Jānis Purvinskis; 19 November 1934 – 6 April 2021) was a Latvian-born Ukrainian Roman Catholic prelate who served as the Diocesan Bishop of Kyiv–Zhytomyr since 16 January 1991 until 15 June 2011 (until 25 November 1998 as the Diocesan Bishop of Zhytomyr).

== Early life ==
Bishop Purwinski was born into a peasant Roman Catholic family of Polish ethnicity in Latgale. After graduation from school he joined the Major Theological Seminary in Riga in 1956, and was ordained as priest on 13 April 1961, for his native Roman Catholic Archdiocese of Riga.

== Career ==
From 1961 until 1977, Fr. Purwinski began to serve as an assistant priest in Daugavpils and after, as a parish priest and vice-dean in Krāslava, Baltinava and Indra. In 1977 he was transferred to Ukraine and began to learn the Ukrainian language and work as assistant priest in St. Sophia's Cathedral, Zhytomyr (from 1984 he was a dean of the Cathedral). Before moving to Ukraine Fr. Purwinski spoke Polish, Latgalian, Latvian and Russian. Alongside parish work, from 1981 until 1991 he served as a Bishopric Vicar for Ukraine and Moldova.

On 16 January 1991 he was appointed by Pope John Paul II as the Diocesan Bishop of the recreated Roman Catholic Diocese of Zhytomyr. On 4 March 1991, he was consecrated as bishop by Archbishop Francesco Colasuonno and other prelates of the Roman Catholic Church in St. Sophia's Cathedral in Zhytomyr.

== Later life ==
He retired on 15 June 2011 and resided in Zhytomyr. He died on 6 April 2021, after being hospitalized a few days prior due to COVID-19 complications.

Catholic Church titles
Preceded by Reestablished	Diocesan Bishop of Kyiv-Zhytomyr (until 1998 Bishop of Zhytomyr); 1991–2011	Succeeded by Petro Malchuk
