= Aurusuliana =

Roman-era city in present-day Tunisia

Aurusuliana was a Roman-era city located in what was the Roman Province of Byzacena (Roman North Africa). The exact site of the city remains unknown and a source of some controversy. It is now generally considered to have been in present-day Tunisia, in the territory of Henchir-Guennara, but Joseph Bingham believed it to have been in Tripoliana, while others placed it in Numidia.

The city was also the seat of an ancient Christian bishopric, and one bishop, Habettus, is known from antiquity.
