= Święcicki =

Święcicki (feminine: Święcicka; plural: Święciccy) is a Polish surname. In other form: Swiecicki, Swensitzky, Svientsitskyi, Schwetz (germanized). Notable people include:

- Bolesław Święcicki (1901–1976), Polish journalist, publicist and editor
- Józef Święcicki (1859–1913), Polish designer and builder of Bydgoszcz
- Marcin Święcicki (born 1947), Polish politician and economist
- Mikołaj Święcicki (ca. 1640–1707) was from 1697, the Bishop of Kiev and Poznań
- Paulin Święcicki (1841–1876), Polish writer
- Wacław Święcicki (1848–1900), Polish poet and socialist
