= Markijan Trofimiak =

- Bishop emeritus of Lutsk
- Appointed: 25 March 1998
- Predecessor: Vacant (last held by Adolf Szelążek)
- Successor: Vitaliy Skomarovskyi
- Previous post: Auxiliary bishop of Lviv (1991–1998)

Orders
- Ordination: 26 May 1974 by Julijans Vaivods
- Consecration: 2 March 1991 by Marian Jaworski

Personal details
- Born: 16 April 1947 (age 78) Kozova, Ukraine

Coat of arms

Markijan Trofimiak (born April 16, 1947 in Kozova, Ukraine) is a Roman Catholic bishop, Auxiliary Bishop of Lviv in 1991-1998 and diocesan Bishop of Lutsk in 1998-2012.

== Biography ==
Born in Kozova, Ukraine. He was ordained on May 26, 1974 in Riga at the hands of Cardinal Julijans Vaivods. On January 16, 1991 he was appointed auxiliary bishop of Lviv. He was consecrated and received at the hands of Cardinal Marian Jaworski, on March 2, 1991. On March 25, 1998 Trofimiak was appointed Bishop of the Diocese of Lutsk. For two terms he was deputy chairman of the Conference of Roman Catholic Bishops of Ukraine (until 2009), Chairman of the Committee on the Liturgy and sacred art of the Roman Catholic episcopate. In the Roman Catholic episcopate of Ukraine is responsible for contacts with state authorities.
