= Marazanae =

Africa Proconsularis.

Marazanae was a Roman town of the Roman province of Byzacena during the Roman Empire and into late antiquity.

== Location ==
The town was between Sufes and Aquae Regiae.

The ruins at Henchir-Guennara, (Tunisia) dating from the Roman Empire are tentatively attributed to Marazanae. The town appears on the Antonine Itinerary and is believed to have been on a crossroads during antiquity.

== Bishopric ==
The town was also the seat of an ancient Christian bishopric. During the Donatist controversy there were congregations both of Catholics and of Donatists in the town. Marazane, perhaps identifiable with Henchir-Guenmara in today's Tunisia, is an ancient episcopal seat of the Bizacena Roman province.

There are five ancient documented bishops of Marazane.

- Felice who took part in the Council of Carthage (256) called by Saint Cyprian to discuss the issue of the lapsii.
- At the Council of Carthage (411), between the Catholic and Donatists of Roman Africa the town was represented by the Catholic Eunomio and the Donatist Habetdeus.
- Vindiciano attended the synod assembled in Carthage by the Arian King Huneric of the Vandal Kingdom in 484, after which Vindiciano was exiled.
- Saturnino participated in the anti-monotheistic Council of 641.

Today the bishopric of Marazane survives as a titular bishopric and the current bishop is Serhii Kippa, auxiliary bishop of Kyiv-Zhytomyr.
