= Renovabis =

Charitable trust in Germany

Renovabis is a charitable organization of the Roman Catholic Church in Germany, established in 1993 to help people in Eastern and Central Europe. Its main office is located in Freising, Germany.

By its own account, Renovabis has spent about US$400,000,000 in private donations on 14,000 assistance projects in 28 countries.
