= Henchir-Guennara =

Henchir-Guennara is a locality and Archaeological site in Tunisia 53.5km southwest of Tunis,

Henchir-Guennara is nearby to Jebel ed Derijah, Jebel Ghaoues and Ksar Tyr. It is at 36° 37' 58" N, 9° 49' 42"E in the located in Gouvernorat de la Manouba, Tunisia and the area is predominantly farming land and has an elevation of 140 metres above sea level.

There are numerous ruins at Henchir-Guennara, dating from the Roman Empire. These are tentatively attributed to the Roman town of Marazanae.
