= Slobozia-Rașcov =

Slobozia-Rașcov Слобода-Рашков
- Village
- Location within Moldova
- Coordinates: 47°57′2″N 28°56′48″E
- Country (de jure): Moldova
- Country (de facto): Transnistria (Note: Transnistria's political status is disputed. It considers itself to be an independent state, but this is not recognised by any UN member state. The Moldovan government and the international community consider Transnistria a part of Moldova's territory.)
- Elevation: 211 m (692 ft)
- Time zone: UTC+2 (EET)
  - Summer (DST): UTC+3 (EEST)

Slobozia-Rașcov (Moldovan Cyrillic: Слобозия-Рашков; Russian: Слобода-Рашков, romanized: Sloboda-Rashkov; Ukrainian: Слобода-Рашків, romanized: Sloboda-Rashkiv) is a village in the Camenca District of Transnistria, Moldova. It has since 1990 been administered as a part of the breakaway Pridnestrovian Moldavian Republic.

According to the 2004 census, the population of the locality was 799 inhabitants, of which 37 (4.63%) Moldovans (Romanians), 346 (43.3%) Ukrainians, 29 (3.62%) Russians and 385 (48.2%) of other ethnicities (mainly Poles).

== Notable people ==
- Petro Herkulan Malchuk (1965–2016), Ukrainian Roman Catholic archbishop
