= Vitaliy Kryvytskyi =

Ukrainian Roman Catholic bishop

Vitalii Kryvytskyi, S.D.B.
- Diocesan Bishop of Roman Catholic Diocese of Kyiv-Zhytomyr
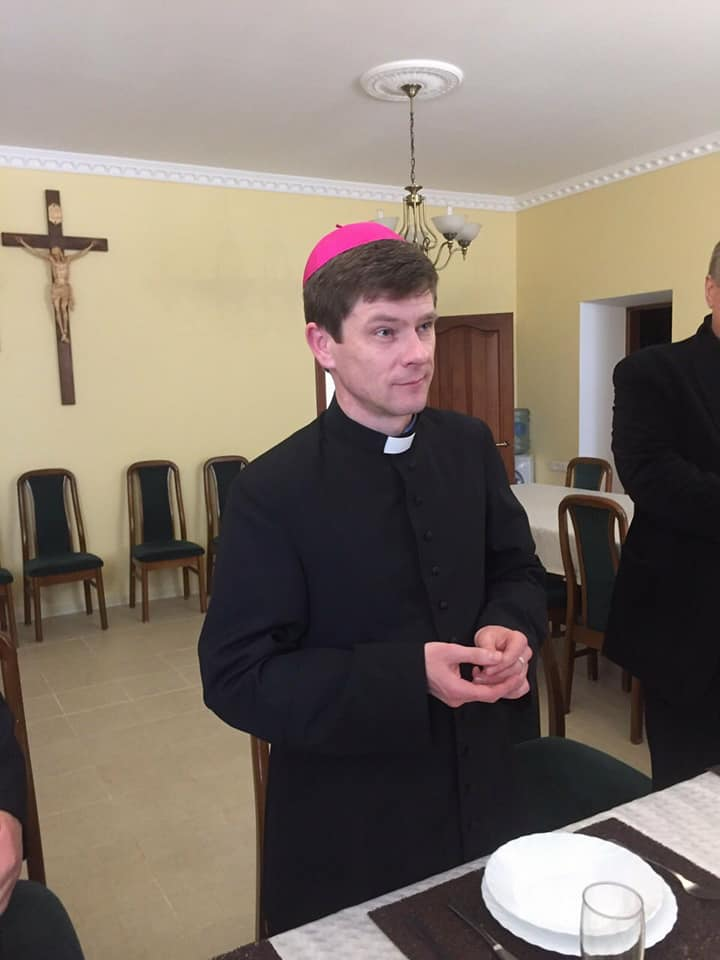
- Church: Roman Catholic Church
- Appointed: 30 April 2017
- Predecessor: Vitaliy Skomarovskyi (Ap. Administrator)
- Successor: Incumbent

Orders
- Ordination: 24 May 1997 (Priest) by Albin Małysiak
- Consecration: 24 June 2017 (Bishop) by Claudio Gugerotti

Personal details
- Born: Vitaliy Frantsovych Kryvytskyi; 19 August 1972 (age 53) Odesa, Ukrainian SSR
- Motto: In Iesu Christo
- Coat of arms

Bishop Vitalii Kryvytskyi or Vitaliy Krivitskiy, S.D.B. (Ukrainian: Віталій Кривицький; born 19 August 1972 in Odesa, Ukrainian SSR) is a Ukrainian Roman Catholic prelate serving as the diocesan bishop of Kyiv–Zhytomyr since 30 April 2017.

== Life ==
Bishop Kryvytskyi was born in the Polish family of Frants Kryvytskyi (Krzywicki) in Southern Ukraine. His Christian life was inspired by Fr. Tadeusz Hoppe, S.D.B., so after secondary school he joined the Salesians of Don Bosco in 1989. He made his solemn profession on 27 July 1996, and was ordained as priest on 24 May 1997, after graduation from the Major Theological Seminary in Grodno, Belarus (1990–1991) and Major Theological Salesian Seminary in Kraków, Poland (1991–1997). At the same time he studied at the Catholic University of Lublin.

Fr. Kryvytskyi returned to Ukraine in 1997 and began to work in the Salesian parishes as a superior of the different local communities and youth animator in Odesa, Zhytomyr Oblast and Lviv Oblast.

On 30 April 2017 he was appointed by the Pope Francis as the Diocesan Bishop of the Kyiv–Zhytomyr. On 24 June 2017 he was consecrated as bishop by Archbishop Claudio Gugerotti, Apostolic Nuncio to Ukraine, and other prelates of the Roman Catholic Church in the Co-Cathedral of St. Alexander in Kyiv.

Catholic Church titles
Preceded by Vitaliy Skomarovskyi (as Apostolic Administrator)	Diocesan Bishop of Kyiv-Zhytomyr; 2017–	Succeeded by Incumbent
