= Mikołaj Święcicki =

Mikołaj Święcicki of the Jastrzębiec coat of arms (born ca. 1640 in Święcice, died 27 November 1707 in Vienna) was from 1697, the Bishop of Kiev, from 1699, the Bishop of Poznań, the chancellor of the Poznań cathedral chapter in 1674–1679, the dean of the Poznań cathedral chapter in 1679-1701 scholastic of the collegiate chapter of Saint. John the Baptist in Warsaw, an official and vicar general in Mazovia in 1684.

== Curriculum vitae ==
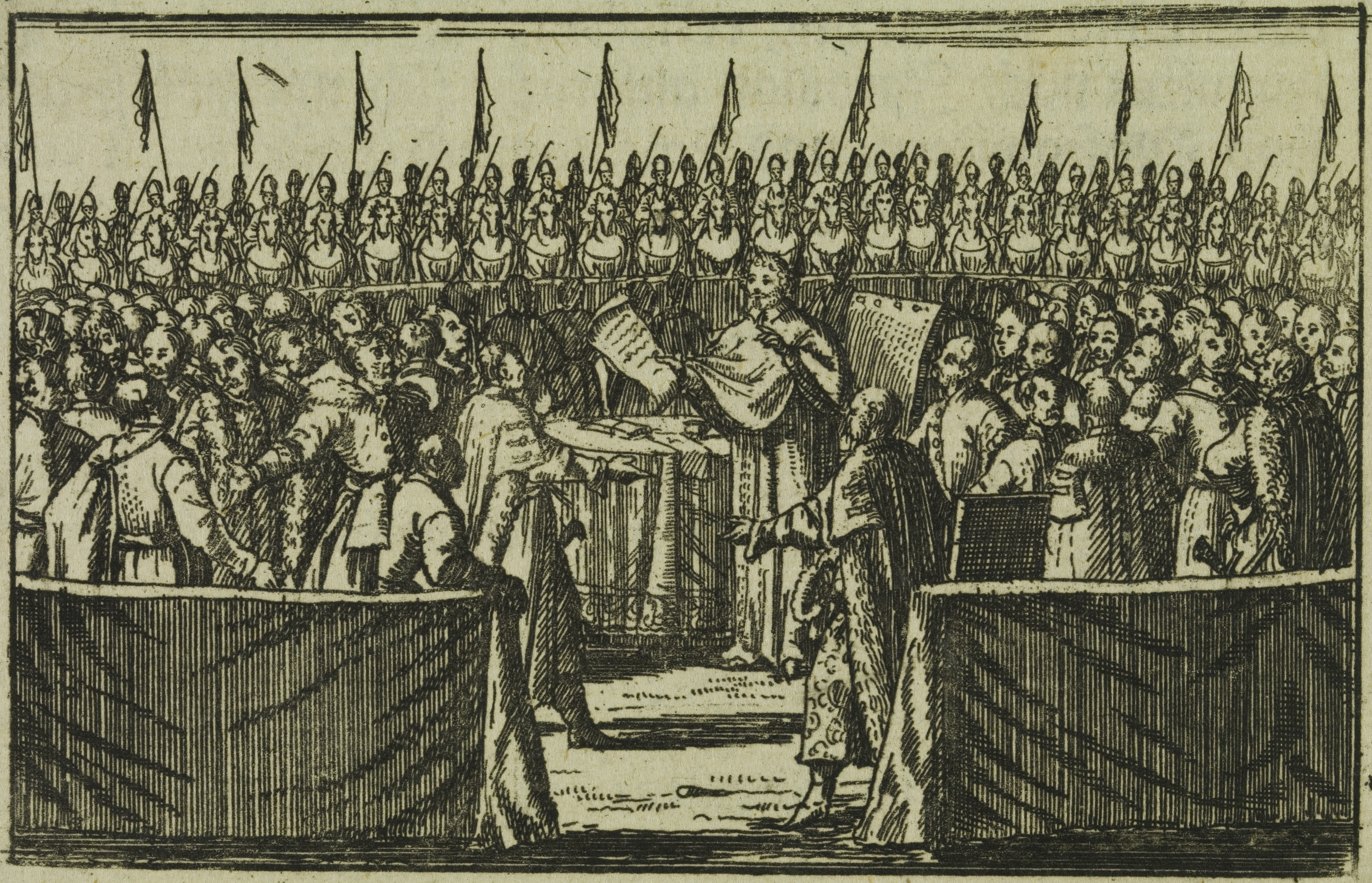
Election of Stanisław Leszczyński in 1704.

He was a clerical deputy of the Poznań chapter for the Crown Tribunal in 1676 and 1678.

In 1704, he was an interrex in the substitution of Archbishop Michał Stefan Radziejowski (deprived of jurisdiction by Pope Clement XI), a grand referendary from 1689, and the abbot of Trójceszyn.

He was a member of the Warsaw Confederation in 1704. A supporter of Stanisław Leszczyński's choice as the King of Poland. Despite the opposition of the Pope, he proclaimed his candidate as King. For this act, on the orders of August II, Sasa was captured and sent back to Rome. There, on the order of Pope Clement XI, he was imprisoned in Ancona, where he spent two and a half years. He died in Vienna when he was on his way back to Poland.
