= Stanisław Zaremba (bishop of Kyiv) =

Polish cleric and scholar (d. 1648)

- Predecessor: Andrzej Szołdrski
- Successor: Jan Leszczyński

Stanisław Zaremba (date of birth unknown – d. 1648) was a Polish writer, Cistercian, abbot of Sulejów. Since 1645, Roman Catholic bishop of Kyiv.

In his work Okulary na rozchody w Koronie i z Korony... ("A Look at Expenditure in the Crown and from the Crown") published in 1623 he recommended development of craft and trade, and material export limitation.

== Works ==
- — (1623). Okulary na rozchody w Koronie i z Korony, przez które jako w zwierciadle obaczyć każdy może fortele i nieznośne zyski, zdierstwa a łupiestwa kupieckie, przy tym śrzodki i sposoby różne jako temu zabieżeć i one pohamować. Roku pańskiego 1623 (in Polish). OCLC 82926839.
