= Caritas Ukraine =

Catholic charity organization

- Карітас України
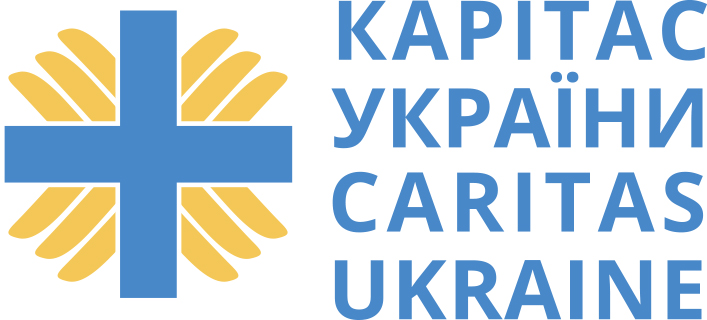
- Abbreviation: CUA
- Established: 1994
- Type: Nonprofit
- Legal status: National charitable foundation
- Location: Lviv, Ukraine
- Coordinates: 49.83878°N 24.01108°E
- Origins: Catholic Social Teaching
- Region served: Ukraine
- Fields: social work, humanitarian aid
- President: Tetiana Stawnychy
- Affiliations: Caritas Europa, Caritas Internationalis
- Website: www.caritas.ua

Caritas Ukraine (Ukrainian: Карітас України) is a Ukrainian Catholic not-for-profit and humanitarian relief organisation.

Caritas Ukraine is a member of both Caritas Europa and Caritas Internationalis. Within Ukraine, it is one of two national Caritas organisations, alongside Caritas-Spes. The distinction between the two lies in their founding initiatives: Caritas Ukraine was initiated by the Greek Catholic bishops, whereas Caritas-Spes was initiated by the Latin Catholic bishops.

== Work ==
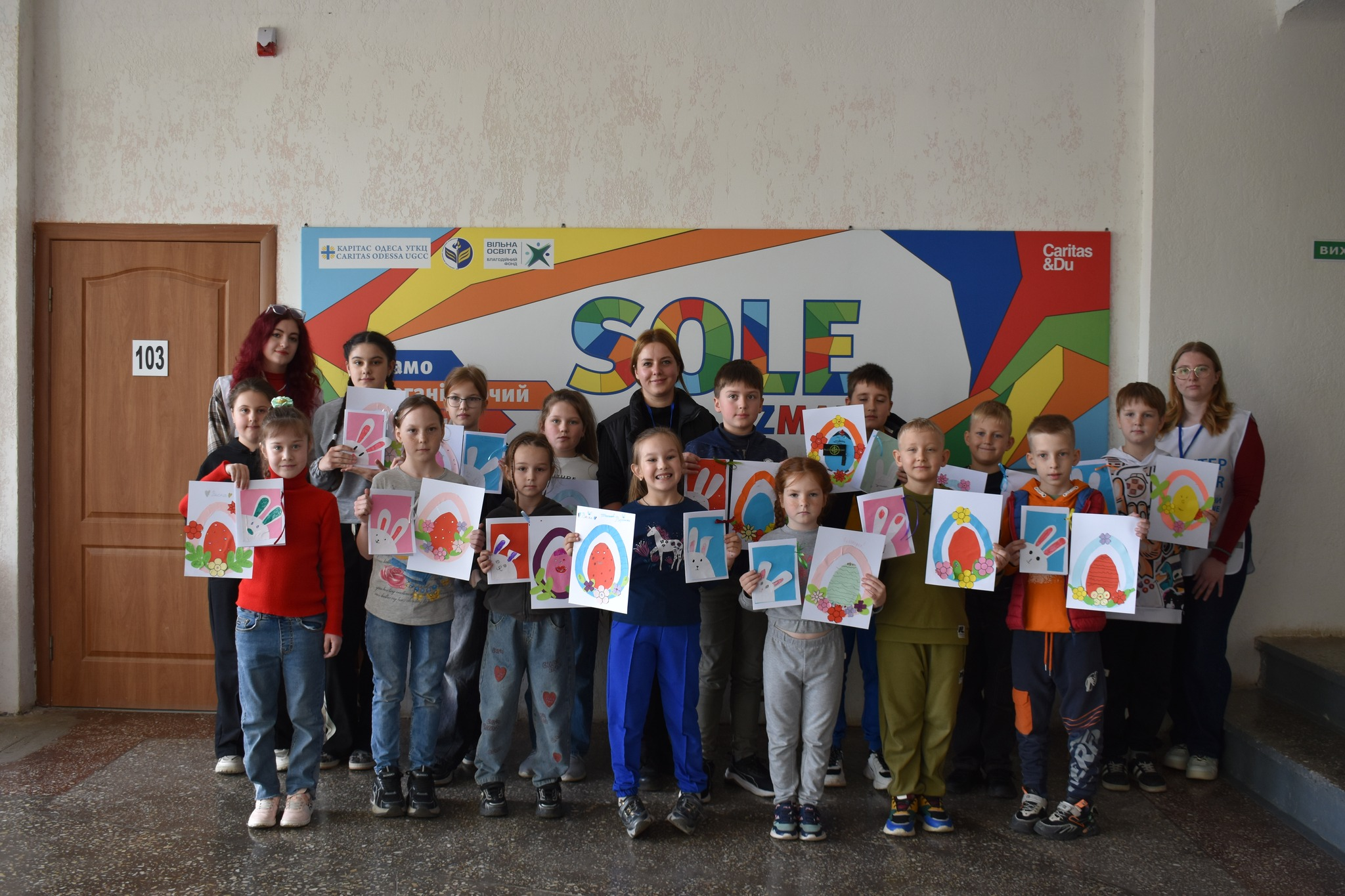
Children showing their paintings in a centre of Caritas Odessa, one of Caritas Ukraine's local organisations.

Caritas Ukraine is dedicated to advancing traditions of charitable activities and social work across various sectors. Since its inception, it has focused on supporting vulnerable populations. These areas of work include assistance to children, youth, families facing crisis situations, people with special needs; as well as health care, social migration issues, and community building. Emergency assistance is currently the most important sector for the organisation.

Between the start of the Russo-Ukrainian War in 2014 and the Russian invasion of Ukraine in 2022, Caritas Ukraine quickly scaled up its activities. Until 2017, the organisation established 12 new offices and hired 600 new staff. Until 2022, Caritas Ukraine helped more than 800,000 people. In the two years after the 2022 invasion and the subsequent explosion of humanitarian needs, the organisation helped more than three million people in the country, making it one of the largest humanitarian agencies in Ukraine.

Humanitarian support is provided through a variety of programmes, including the distribution of food kits, hygiene products and medicines, cash grants, assistance in creating or restoring individual businesses or agricultural activities, repair of damaged houses, psychological and legal support.

== Structure ==
Main office of Caritas Ternopil, another local organisation.

Caritas Ukraine works with more than 1,000 employees and volunteers in 40 regional organisations across 20 regions of Ukraine. The organisation has two national coordination offices, in Lviv and in Kyiv.

== Awards ==
Caritas of Ukraine won awards at the National Charity Ukraine competition in 2013, 2014, 2016 and 2017. In 2019, the organisation was one of the winners of the first edition of the Bohdan and Varvara Khanenko Award.

In 2023, Caritas Ukraine's President Tetiana Stawnychy was awarded the Prix Caritas from Caritas Switzerland for the vital humanitarian aid her organisation has been providing following the Russian invasion of Ukraine.
