= Roman Catholic Diocese of Zhytomyr =

Former Catholic diocese in Ukraine

The Diocese of Zhytomyr was twice a Latin Church ecclesiastical territory or diocese of the Catholic Church in part of Ukraine, namely from 1321 to 1789 and again from 1925 to 1998.

== History ==
- Established in 1321 as Diocese of Zhytomyr / Žytomyr / Zytomierz (Latin: Zytomerien(sis))
- Suppressed on 8 August 1798, its territory being reassigned to establish the Diocese of Lutsk and Zytomierz (suffragan see of the Archdiocese of Mohilev)
- Restored on 28 October 1925 as Diocese of Žytomyr / Zhytomyr / Zytomierz (Latin: Zytomerien(sis)), on territory returned from the above Diocese of Lutsk and Zytomierz.
- Suppressed again on 25 November 1998, to establish the Diocese of Kyïv–Žytomyr; however, its cathedral of the Holy Wisdom is the new bishopric's episcopal seat, while first-mentioned Kyiv (Ukraine's national capital Kyiv) only has a co-cathedral (and a former cathedral).

== Episcopal ordinaries ==
Suffragan Bishops of Žytomyr
very incomplete : most incumbents unavailable

- Auxiliary Bishop: Antanas Karosas (Antoni Karaś) (8 November 1906 – 7 April 1910), Titular Bishop of Dorylæum (8 November 1906 – 7 April 1910; later Bishop of Sejny (7 April 1910 – 28 October 1925), Bishop of Vilkaviškis (Lithuania) (5 April 1926 – death 7 July 1947)
- Jan Purwiński (16 January 1991 – 25 November 1998)
  - Auxiliary Bishop: Stanislav Szyrokoradiuk, Friars Minor (O.F.M.) (26 November 1994 – 25 November 1998), Titular Bishop of Surista (26 November 1994 – 12 April 2014, next as Auxiliary Bishop of Kyïv–Žytomyr (Ukraine) (25 November 1998 – 12 April 2014), also Apostolic Administrator of Lutsk (Ukraine) (24 July 2012 – 12 April 2014); since 4 April 2014 Bishop of Kharkiv–Zaporizhia (Ukraine).

== See also ==
- List of Catholic dioceses in Ukraine

== Sources and external links ==
- GCatholic - data for all sections
