= Saint Sophia Cathedral, Zhytomyr =

Coordinates: 50.2550°N 28.6544°E

St. Sophia Cathedral
- Кафедральний собор св. Софії
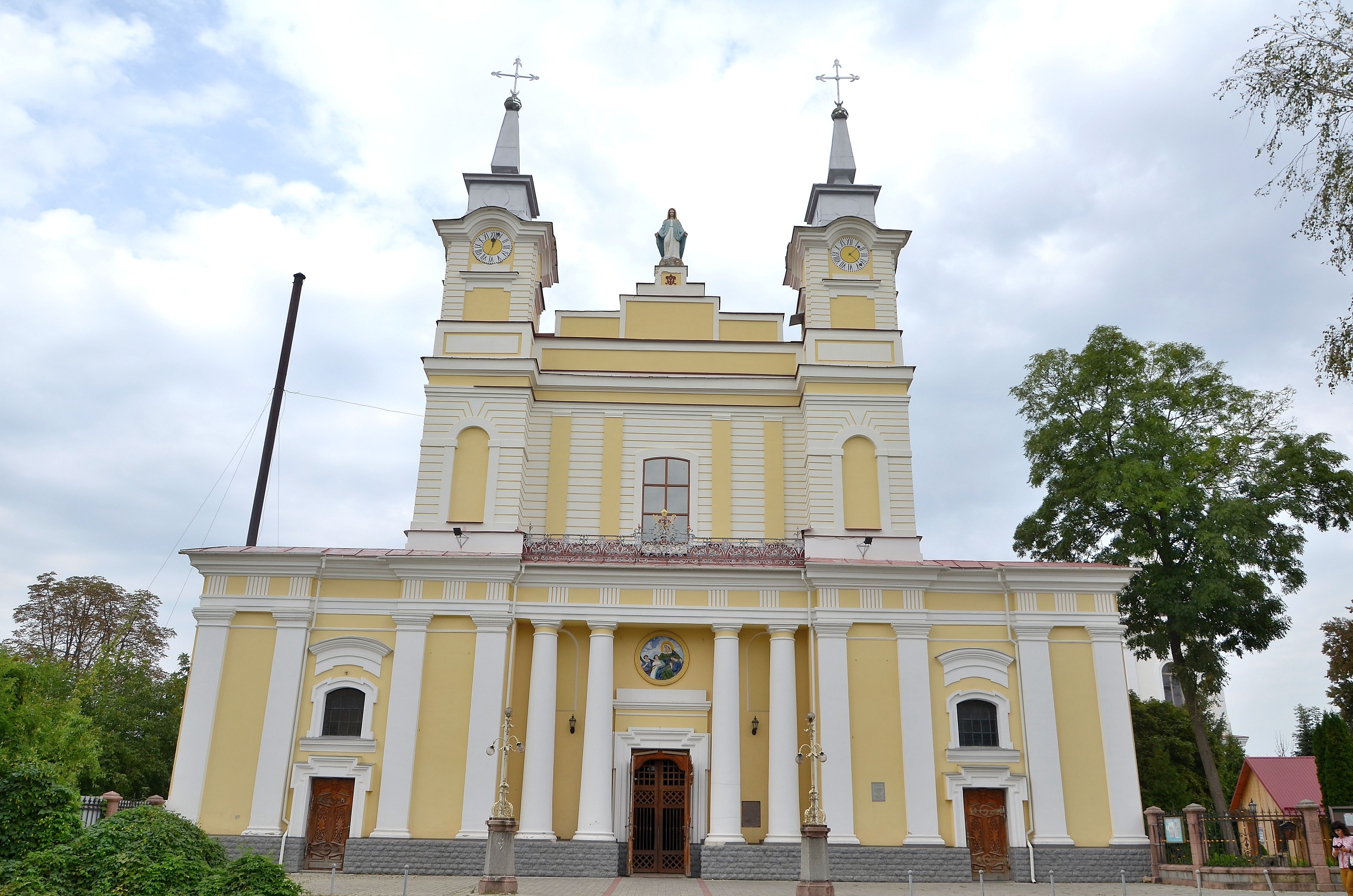
- St. Sophia Cathedral
- Location: Zhytomyr
- Country: Ukraine
- Denomination: Roman Catholic Church

Immovable Monument of National Significance of Ukraine
- Official name: Кафедральний костьол Св. Софії та дзвіниця (Cathedral of St. Sophia and its bell tower)
- Type: Architecture
- Reference no.: 060017

Saint Sophia Cathedral (Ukrainian: Кафедральний собор св. Софії; Polish: Katedra Świętej Zofii) is a Catholic church that serves as the principal church of the Roman Catholic Diocese of Kyiv-Zhytomyr, Ukraine.

The church was first built between 1746 and 1748, before the Second Partition of Poland, and was founded by Bishop Samuel Jan Ozga.

After a fire in 1768, the church was converted into a Classical-style three-nave building. The church is now an eclectic building with a preserved Baroque interior. In Soviet times, it was closed to the faithful for several years, and the priests were arrested and sent to labor camps.

After 1991, after the Fall of Communism, the cathedral was restored and enlarged.

The Cathedral has become a "main historical site" for both pilgrims and tourists.

On August 24, 2025, the Ukrainian Independence Day, the Cathedral was the site of an ecumenical prayer service for peace for Ukraine, which included President Vladimir Zelensky (who is of Jewish faith) and Mrs. Zelenska, Archbishop Vitalii Kryvytskyi, and the grand mufti of Ukraine, as well as leaders of the Orthodox, Evangelical, and Greek Catholic denominations.

== See also ==
- Roman Catholicism in Ukraine
