= Sidi Brahim =

Sidi Brahim سيدي ابراھيم Bencenna
- Commune and town
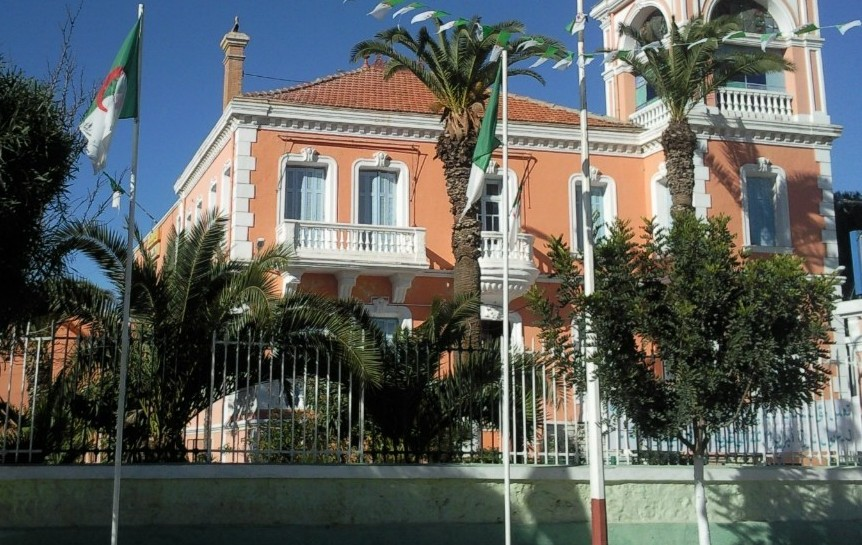

- Location within Algeria
- Coordinates: 35.2606778°N 0.5674668°W
- Country: Algeria
- Province: Sidi Bel Abbès Province

Population (2008)
  - Total: 10,371
- Time zone: UTC+1 (CET)

Sidi Brahim is a small commune of Sidi Bel Abbès Province, Algeria, most famous for producing Sidi Brahim wine.

During the Roman Empire Sidi Brahim was the site of a town of the province of Mauretania Caesariensis called Bencenna. The remains of Bencenna were tentatively identified with ruins at Sidi Brahim.
