= Co-Cathedral of St. Alexander, Kyiv =

Coordinates: 50.4533°N 30.5249°E

Co-Cathedral of St. Alexander
- Співкафедральний собор св. Олександра
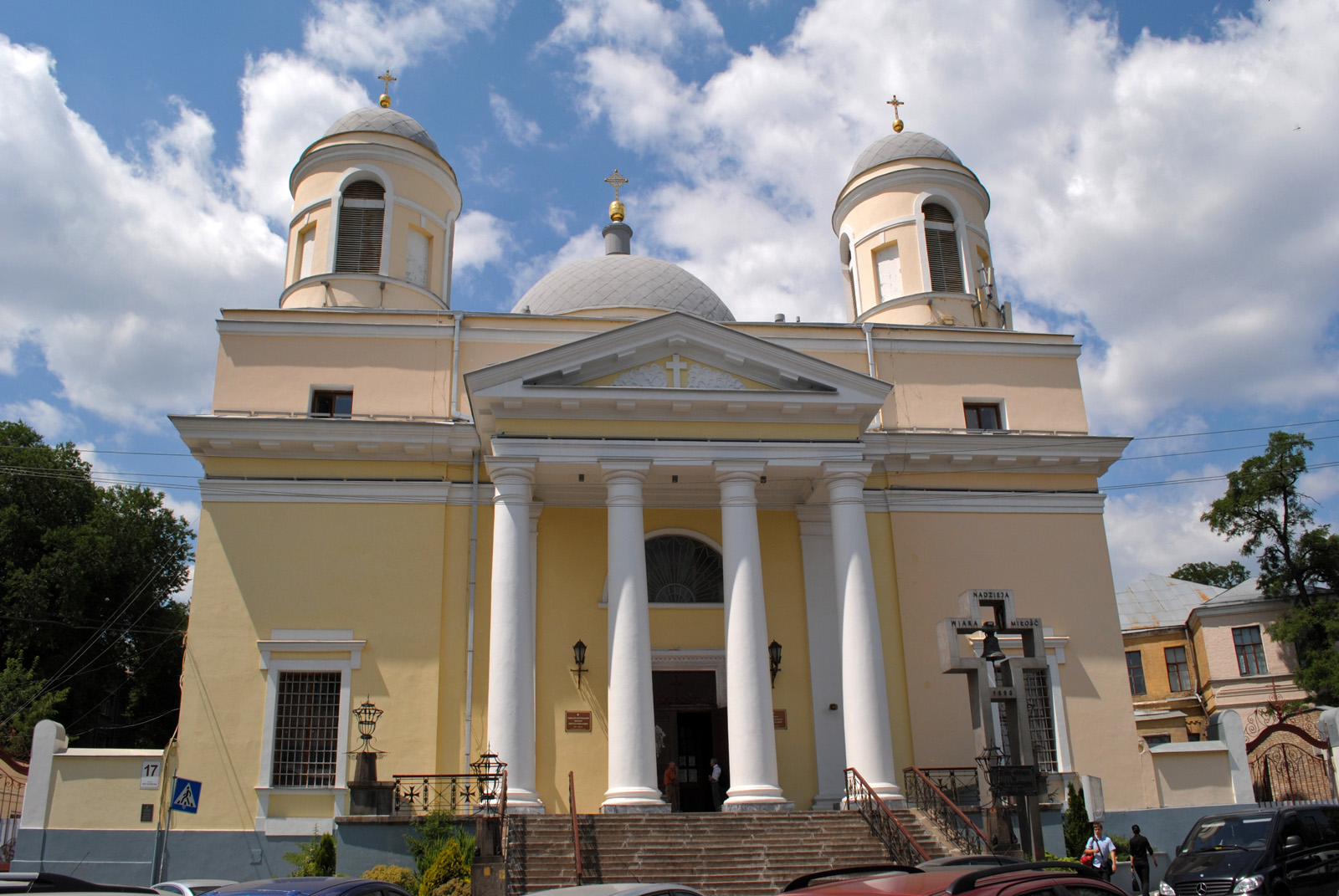
- Co-Cathedral of St. Alexander
- Location: Kyiv
- Country: Ukraine
- Denomination: Catholic Church

Architecture
- Completed: 1842

Administration
- Metropolis: Lviv
- Diocese: Kyiv-Zhytomyr

Immovable Monument of National Significance of Ukraine
- Official name: Костьол Святого Олександра (Cathedral of Saint Alexander)
- Type: Architecture
- Reference no.: 260064-Н

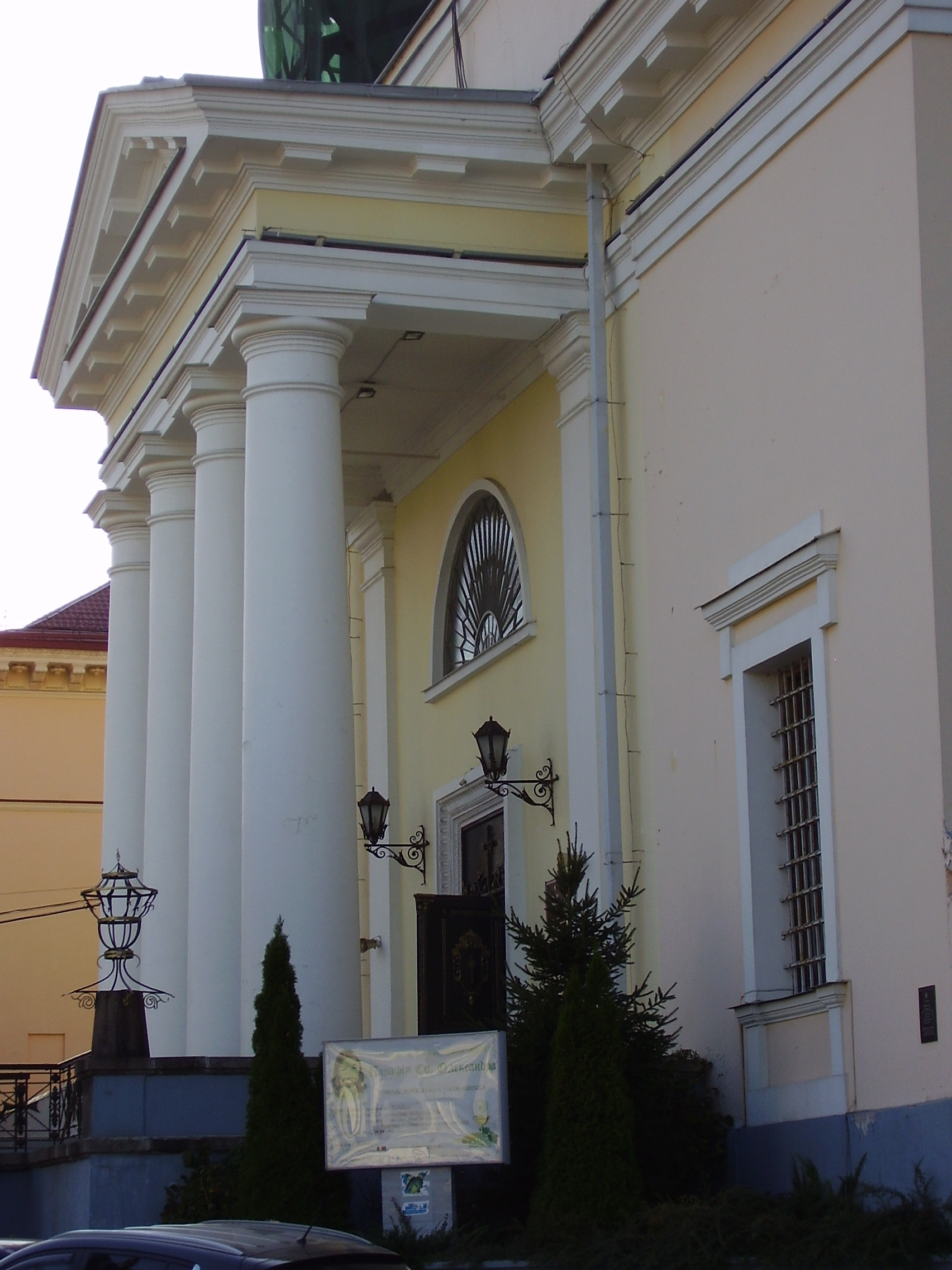
Another view

The Co-Cathedral of St. Alexander (Ukrainian: Співкафедральний собор св. Олександра, romanized: Spivkafedralnyi sobor sv. Oleksandra) also called Cathedral of St. Alexander of Kyiv is a Latin Catholic co-cathedral located in Kyiv, the capital of Ukraine.

Kyiv had a large Polish Catholic minority, which, however, lacked a proper Catholic church. There existed only a small church of the Blessed Virgin Mary and the Apostles Peter and Paul on Pechersk, built at the end of the 18th century (it burned down in 1843). Polish landowners, taking advantage of Tsar Alexander I’s visit to Kyiv, submitted a request to build the Catholic Church of St. Alexander to commemorate the imperial visit. Permission was granted, and the site chosen for construction was a square in the middle of the former Słoboda Lacka, a district where Poles had settled since the time of Yaroslav the Wise.

Construction lasted as long as twenty-five years, primarily due to a lack of funds, but also because of the restrictions imposed on everything Polish and Catholic in Russia after the failure of the November Uprising. The original design was significantly scaled down. Construction was completed in 1842. On 30 August of that year, the church was solemnly consecrated by the Archdeacon of Kyiv, Justyn Stejgwiłło, who at the same time became the first parish priest of the church. The church was on a cruciform plan, with a dome at the intersection of the aisles in the style of classicism.

After 1905, the tsarist authorities eased restrictions on churches other than Russian Orthodox. In Soviet times a planetarium occupied the premises. On 3 August 1937, the then parish priest S. Kwaśniewski, was arrested and accused of conducting counterrevolutionary activities. On 21 September 1937, he was executed by firing squad. The church was closed down. After the fall of communism the building was renovated and became the co-cathedral of the Diocese of Kyiv-Zhytomyr (Dioecesis Kioviensis-Zytomeriensis, Єпархія Київ-Житомир).

== See also ==
- Catholic Church in Ukraine
