= Petro Herkulan Malchuk =

Roman Catholic archbishop (1965–2016)

Petro Herkulan Malchuk, O.F.M. (Ukrainian: Петро Геркулан Мальчук; Polish: Piotr Malczuk; 7 July 1965 – 27 May 2016) was the Roman Catholic Archbishop of Kyiv-Zhytomyr.

== Life ==
Malchuk was born in Slobozia-Rașcov in the Moldovan SSR into a Polish family.

He began studies at the Seminary of Riga in 1986. On 7 June 1992 Petro Herkulan Malchuk was ordained a priest by Jan Olszanski MIC, Bishop of Kamyanets-Podilskyi. In 1993 he made the Franciscan order profession.

Pope Benedict XVI in 2008 appointed him titular bishop of media, and as auxiliary bishop in the Diocese of Southeast Ukrainian Odessa-Simferopol. The episcopal ordination took place on 3 May 2008, with Cardinal Marian Jaworski, Archbishop of Lviv; and Archbishop Ivan Jurkovic, Apostolic Nuncio in Ukraine and Bronislaw Bernacki, Bishop of Odessa-Simferopol as co-consecrators.

On 15 June 2011 he was appointed by Pope Benedict XVI with a personal title of Archbishop ("personal capacity") to the pastors of the Diocese of Kyiv-Zhytomyr. The inauguration at the St. Alexander's Cathedral (Kiev) was the first since 1680 in the Ukrainian capital of Kiev itself; Malchuk is also the first pastor of the diocese, and holds the title of an archbishop.

He died on 27 May 2016 of a suspected heart attack in Grodno while participating in the Eucharistic Congress.

== Notes ==
First inauguration of a bishop in Kyiv since 1680", Domradio, 5 August 2011
