= Eastern Ukraine =

Eastern, mostly Russian-speaking part of Ukraine

Coordinates: 49°N 37°E

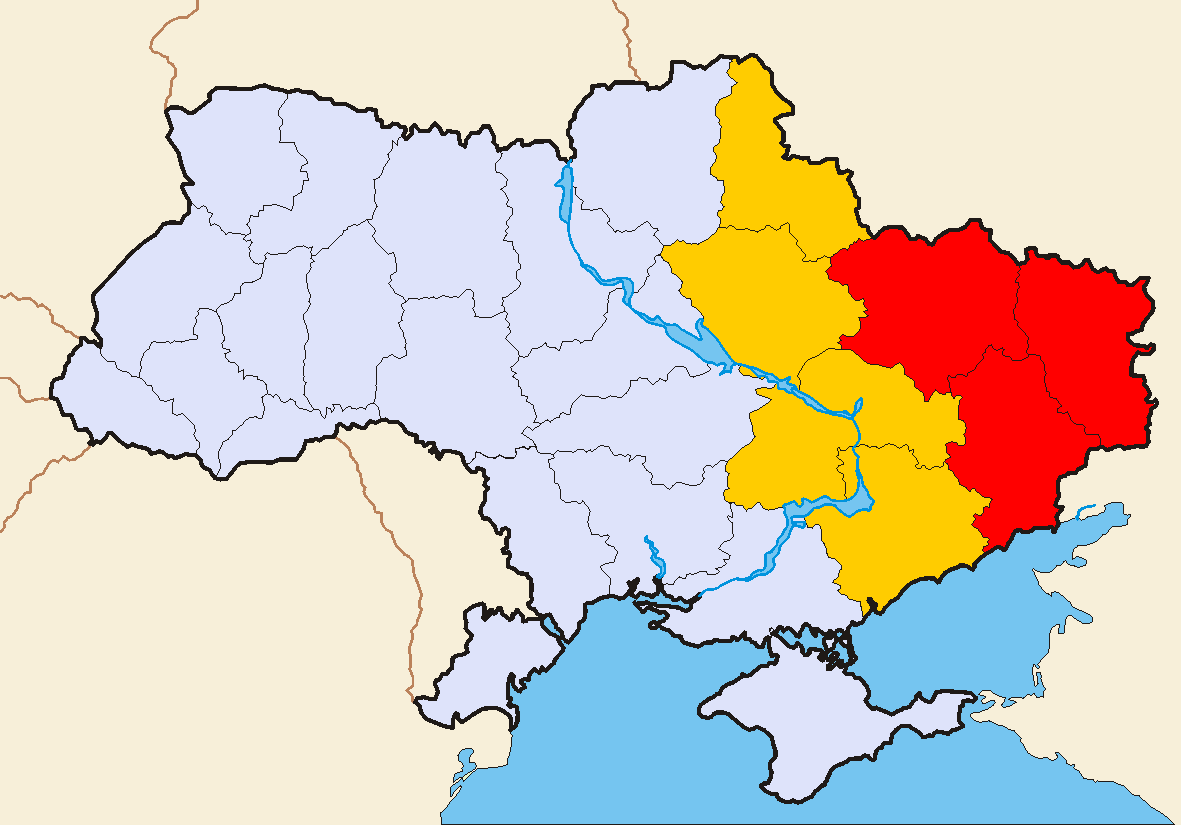
The oblasts included in "eastern Ukraine" vary. Red – always included Orange – sometimes included

Eastern Ukraine or East Ukraine (Ukrainian: Східна Україна, romanized: Skhidna Ukrayina; Russian: Восточная Украина, romanized: Vostochnaya Ukraina) is primarily the territory of Ukraine east of the Dnipro (or Dnieper) river, particularly Kharkiv, Luhansk and Donetsk oblasts (provinces). Dnipropetrovsk and Zaporizhzhia oblasts are often also regarded as "eastern Ukraine".

Almost a third of the country's population lives in the region, which includes several cities with population of around a million. Within Ukraine, the region is the most highly urbanized, particularly portions of central Kharkiv Oblast, south-western Luhansk Oblast, central, northern and eastern areas of Donetsk Oblast.

== Geography ==
The region stretches from southern areas of the Central Russian Upland to the northern shores of the Sea of Azov, from the eastern border with Russia to Black Sea and Dnieper Lowlands (including the left bank of the Dnipro) to the west. Other than the Dnipro, the major river of eastern Ukraine is the Siverskyi Donets. The main economic region of that part of the country is the Donbas, whose name is a contraction of "Donets Basin", named after the Siverskyi Donets. The region became the scene of an armed conflict between Ukraine and Russian proxy forces.

=== Cities and population ===
The territory is heavily urbanized and commonly associated with the Donbas. The three largest metropolitan cities form an industrial triangle within the region. Among the major cities with population of over 200,000 people are Kharkiv, Dnipro, Donetsk-Makiivka, Zaporizhzhia, Mariupol, Luhansk, Horlivka and Kamianske. Donetsk and Makiivka create urban sprawl, with very close proximity to other important cities such as Horlivka and Yenakieve.

Oblast (province)	Ukrainian name	Area in km^{2}	Population at 2001 Census	Population at 2012 estimate	Notes
Donetsk	Донецька область	26,517	4,825,563	4,403,178	
Kharkiv	Харківська область	31,418	2,914,212	2,742,180	
Luhansk	Луганська область	26,683	2,546,178	2,272,676	
Total for 3 oblasts		84,618	10,285,953	9,418,034	
Zaporizhzhia	Запорізька область	27,183	1,929,171	1,791,668	
Dnipropetrovsk	Дніпропетровська область	31,923	3,561,224	3,320,299	
Total for 5 oblasts		143,724	15,776,348	14,530,001	

== Demographics ==
=== Ethnicity and language ===
According to the 2001 census, the majority of eastern Ukraine's population are ethnic Ukrainians, while ethnic Russians form a significant minority. The most common language in urban areas of the Luhansk and Donetsk Oblasts is Russian, having long dominated in government and the media. When Ukraine became independent, there were no Ukrainian-language schools in Donetsk.

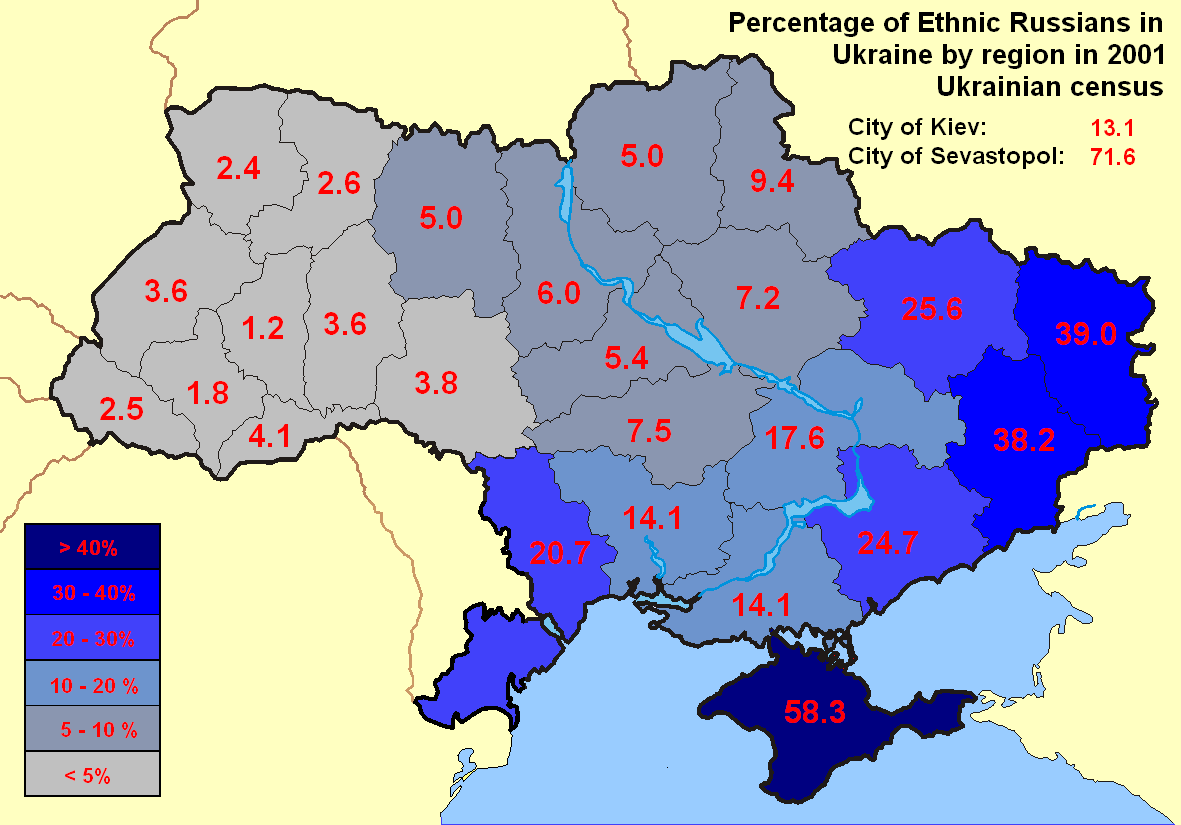
Ethnic Russians by region (Census 2001)

Dnipropetrovsk Oblast
	percent
Ukrainians	79.3%
Russians	17.6%
Belarusians	0.8%
Jews	0.4%
Armenians	0.3%
Azerbaijanis	0.2%

Donetsk Oblast
	percent
Ukrainians	56.9%
Russians	38.2%
Greeks	1.6%
Belarusians	0.5%
Tatars	0.4%
Armenians	0.3%

Kharkiv Oblast
	percent
Ukrainians	70.7%
Russians	25.6%
Belarusians	0.5%
Jews	0.4%
Armenians	0.3%
Tatars	0.2%

Luhansk Oblast
	percent
Ukrainians	58.0%
Russians	39.0%
Belarusians	0.8%
Tatars	0.3%
Armenians	0.3%
Moldovans	0.2%

Source: National composition of the population. 2001 Ukrainian Population Census. State Statistics Committee of Ukraine'

Noticeable cultural differences in the region (compared with the rest of Ukraine except Southern Ukraine) are more "positive views" on the Russian language and on the Soviet era and more "negative views" on Ukrainian nationalism.

Effective in August 2012, a law on regional languages entitled any local language spoken by at least a 10% of the population to be declared official within that area. Within weeks, Russian was declared as a regional language in several southern and eastern oblasts and cities. From that point Russian could be used in those cities'/oblasts' administrative office work and documents. On 23 February 2014, the law on regional languages was abolished, making Ukrainian the sole state language at all levels even in eastern Ukraine, but this vote was vetoed by acting President Oleksandr Turchynov on 2 March. A February 2015 survey found that eastern oblasts (61%) preferred "second official regional language" over (31%) "state language" status for Russian. The 2012 law on regional languages was repealed by the Constitutional Court of Ukraine on 28 February 2018 when it ruled the law unconstitutional.

=== Religion ===
Religion in eastern Ukraine (excluding Donbas), 2016
1. Eastern Orthodoxy (63.2%)
2. Not affiliated to the religions listed (24.7%)
3. Simply Christianity (8.10%)
4. Protestantism (1.90%)
5. Islam (0.50%)
6. Roman Catholicism (0.30%)
7. Judaism (0.30%)
8. Hinduism (0.30%)
9. Other religions (0.80%)

According to a 2016 survey of religion in Ukraine held by the Razumkov Center, 73.5% of the population in eastern Ukraine were Christians (63.2% Eastern Orthodox, 8.1% simply Christians, 1.0% Protestants, and 0.3% Latin Catholics), 0.5% were Muslims, 0.3% were Jewish, and 0.3% were Hindus. Not religious and other believers not identifying with any of the listed major religious institutions constituted about 24.7% of the population. It also showed that approximately 55.6% of the population of eastern Ukraine (which in Razumkov's mapping excluded Donbas and consisted of the regions immediately to the west of it) declared to be believers, while 13.4% declared to be undecided or non-believers, and 3.5% declared to be atheist.

== Politics ==
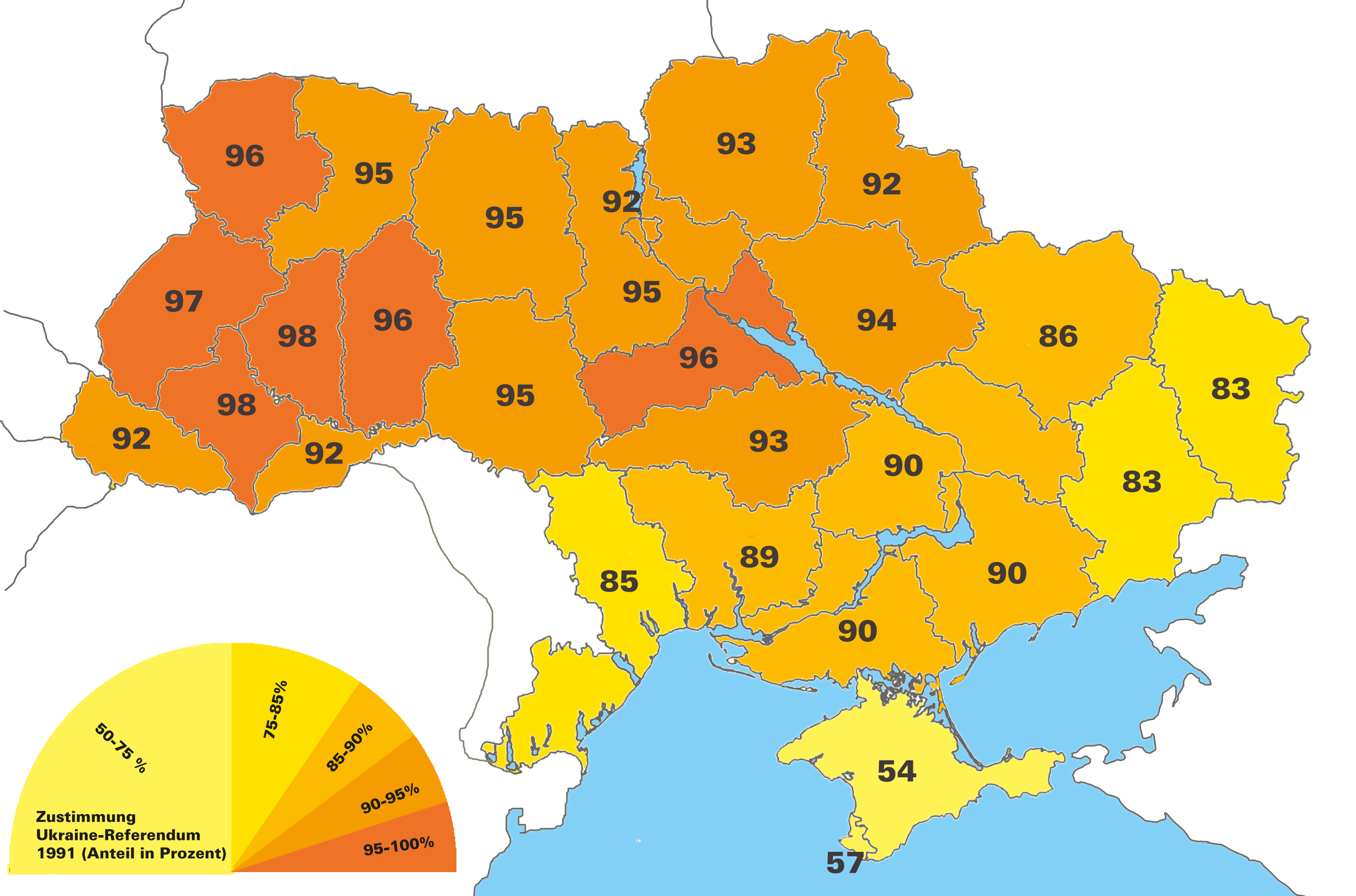
1991 Ukrainian independence referendum, "Yes" votes by region

A large majority of voters in eastern Ukraine (83% or more in each oblast) approved Ukraine's declaration of independence in the 1991 referendum, though the majority was not as big as in the west.

A 2007 survey by the Razumkov Centre asked "Would you like to have your region separated from Ukraine and joined another state?" In eastern Ukraine, 77.9% of respondents disagreed, 10.4% agreed, and the rest were undecided.

In elections, voters of the eastern (and southern) oblasts of Ukraine voted for parties (Communist Party of Ukraine (CPU), Party of Regions) and presidential candidates (Viktor Yanukovych) with a pro-Russian and status quo platform. The electorate of CPU and Party of Regions was very loyal to them. But following the 2014 Ukrainian Revolution the Party of Regions collapsed and the CPU was banned and declared illegal.

In a poll conducted by the Kyiv International Institute of Sociology in the first half of February 2014, 25.8% of those polled in eastern Ukraine believed that "Ukraine and Russia must unite into a single state", nationwide this percentage was 12.5%.

In 2014, the 2014 pro-Russian unrest in Ukraine took place in parts of eastern Ukraine. Some protesters came from Russia to support the unrest. The war in Donbas resulted in thousands of deaths and over a million people leaving their homes. Today, parts of the region are controlled by the self-proclaimed and internationally not-recognized Donetsk People's Republic and Luhansk People's Republic. On 24 February 2022, the region became the scene of the eastern Ukraine offensive.

A November 2015 poll carried out by Rating Group Ukraine in the Donetsk and Luhansk oblasts, except in the Donetsk People's Republic (DPR) and the Luhansk People's Republic (LPR)-controlled areas, found that 75% of residents wanted the entire Donbas region to stay in Ukraine, 7% said that it should join Russia, 1% wanted it to become an independent country, and 3% said that the DPR and the LPR-controlled territories should leave and the rest of Donbas remain in Ukraine. When asked if Russian-speaking citizens are under pressure or threat, 82% said 'no' and 11% said 'yes'. 2% "definitely" and 7% "somewhat" supported Russia sending troops to "protect" Russian-speakers in Ukraine, while 71% did not. 50% wanted Ukraine to remain a unitary country, 14% wanted it to be a federal country, 13% said it should remain unitary but without Crimea, and 7% wanted it to be divided into several countries. If they had to choose between the Eurasian Customs Union and the European Union, 24% in eastern Ukraine (including Kharkiv Oblast) preferred the ECU and 20% preferred the EU (in Donbas: 33% for the ECU, 21% for the EU). On joining NATO, 15% were for, 15% were against, and most said that they would not vote or it was difficult to answer (in Donbas: 16% for, 47% against). Eastern Ukrainians were less likely to vote in parliamentary elections.

== See also ==
- Central Ukraine
- Dnieper Ukraine
- Southern Ukraine
- Western Ukraine
- Wild Fields
