= Central Ukraine =

Central regions of Ukraine

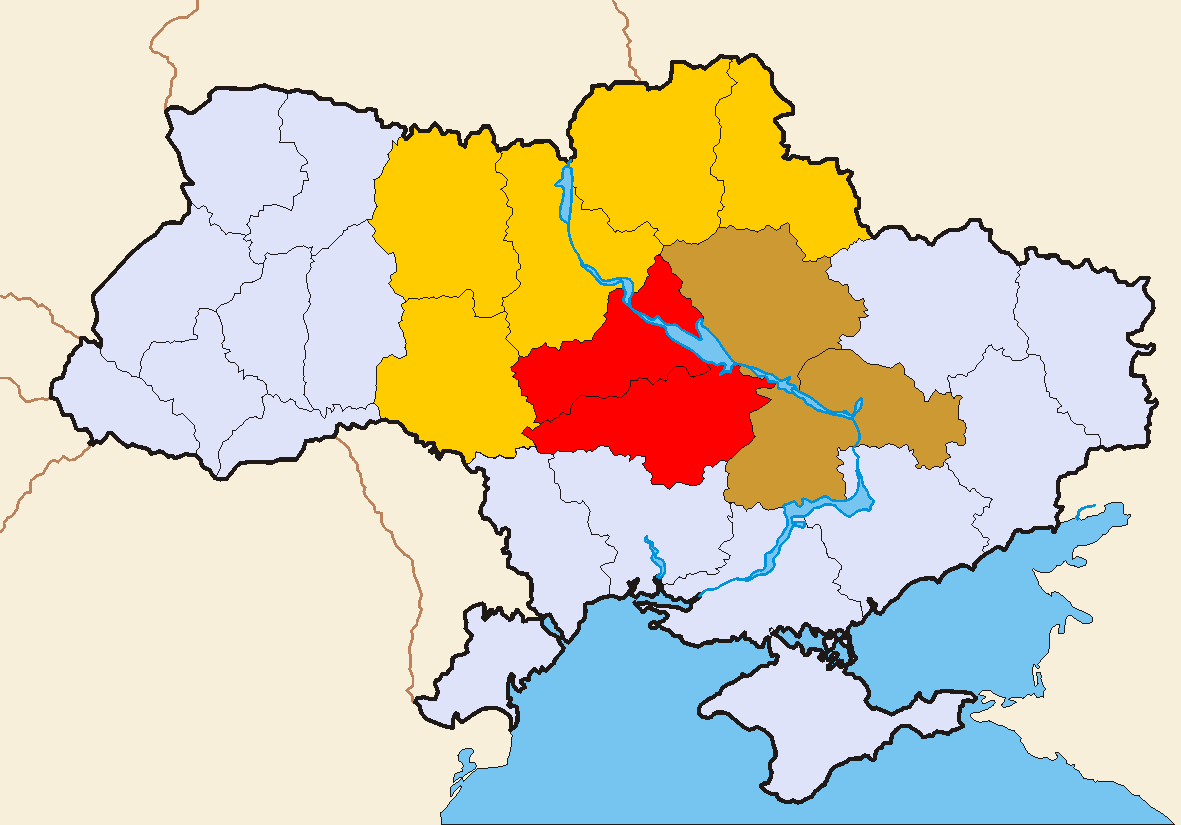
Several oblasts can be referred to as "Central Ukraine": Red – always included Brown – often included Orange – sometimes included

Central Ukraine (Ukrainian: Центральна Україна, romanized: Tsentralna Ukrayina, or Naddnipryanschina, IPA: [tsenˈtrɑlʲnɐ ʊkrɐˈjinɐ]) consists of historical regions of left-bank Ukraine and right-bank Ukraine that reference to the Dnieper River. It is situated away from the Black Sea Littoral North and a midstream of the Dnieper River and its basin.

The cities of Central Ukraine are among the oldest in Ukraine. Also in contrast to the southeastern portion of the country, the region is more agricultural with extensive grain and sunflower fields in the heart of Ukraine. Some of the largest cities in Central Ukraine include Kryvyi Rih, Cherkasy, Kropyvnytskyi, Poltava and Kremenchuk.

== Politics ==
Elections in the Central Ukrainian oblasts (provinces) have historically been competitive between pro-Russian and pro-Western candidates. However, since the 2004 Orange Revolution, Central Ukrainian voters have started to lean toward more pro-Western parties (Our Ukraine, Batkivshchyna) and presidential candidates (Viktor Yushchenko and Yulia Tymoshenko).

In a poll conducted by Kyiv International Institute of Sociology in the first half of February 2014, only 5.4% of polled in Central Ukraine believed "Ukraine and Russia must unite into a single state", whereas nationwide this percentage was 12.5.

== Demographics ==
=== Religion ===
Religion in central Ukraine (2016)
1. Eastern Orthodoxy (76.7%)
2. Not religious (12.7%)
3. Uncertain Christianity (6.50%)
4. Roman Catholicism (1.00%)
5. Protestantism (1.00%)
6. Greek Catholicism (0.40%)
7. Judaism (0.30%)
8. Islam (0.10%)
9. Other religions (0.10%)

According to a 2016 survey of religion in Ukraine held by the Razumkov Center, approximately 73.5% of the population of central Ukraine declared to be believers, while 4.8% declared to be non-believers, and 2.6% declared to be atheists. Of the total population, 86.5% were Christians (76.7% Eastern Orthodox, 6.5% simply Christians, 1.9% Latin Rite Catholics, 1.0% members of various Protestant churches, and 0.4% members of the Ukrainian Greek Catholic Church), 0.3% were Jewish, and 0.1% were Muslims. Not religious and other believers not identifying with any of the listed major religious institutions constituted about 12.8% of the population.

=== Language ===
Surzhyk, a term for mixed Russian-Ukrainian dialects, is commonly spoken throughout Central Ukraine, though, according to sociological pols, most people self-identify as Ukrainian speakers.

== See also ==
- Dnieper Ukraine
- Eastern Ukraine
- Southern Ukraine
- Western Ukraine
- Wild Fields
