= Religion in Ukraine =

Religion in Ukraine (2022)
1. Eastern Orthodoxy (72.0%)
2. Catholicism (Note: Including Greek Catholics (8%) and Latin Catholics (1%).) (9.00%)
3. Protestantism (2.00%)
4. Other Christian (2.00%)
5. No religion (10.0%)
6. Islam (0.90%)
7. Other religion (2.10%)
8. Difficult to say (2.00%)

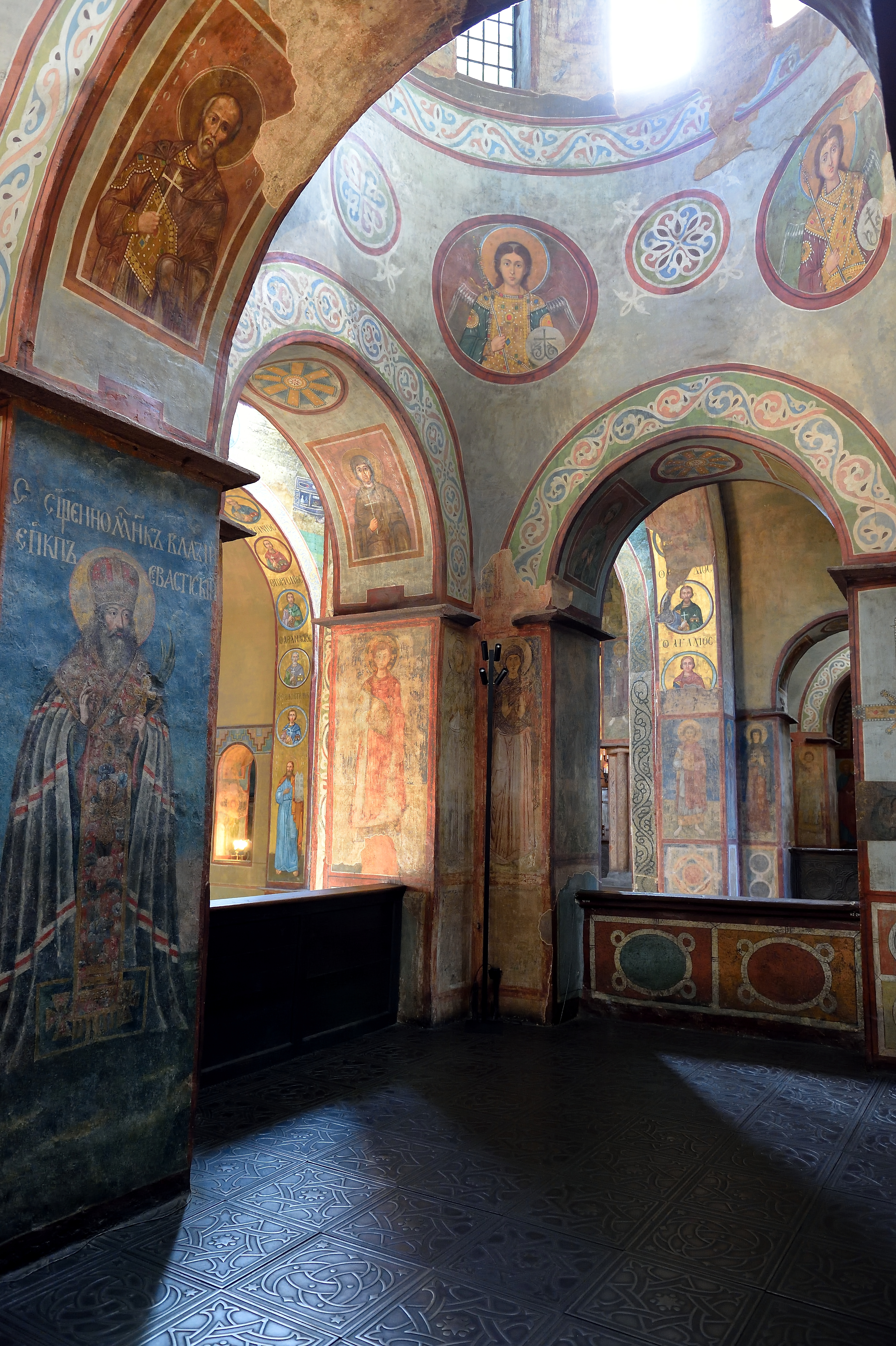
Interior of Saint Sophia Cathedral in Kyiv

Christianity is the predominant religion in Ukraine, with 85% of the population identifying as Christian according to a 2022 survey conducted by the Kyiv International Institute of Sociology (KIIS). Seventy-two percent of the population avowed fidelity to an Eastern Orthodox Church: 54% of Ukrainians proclaimed adherence to the autocephalous Orthodox Church of Ukraine; 14% identified as Orthodox Christian without specifying a church affiliation; 4% associated with the Moscow Patriarchate. Another 9% of Ukrainians professed devotion to the Catholic Church in Ukraine: 8% Ukrainian Greek Catholics and 1% Latin Catholics. Two percent of the population declared affiliation to a mainstream Protestant Church, and a further 2% identified with some alternative sect of Christianity.

Ten percent of Ukrainians identified as atheists. With Christianity in Ukraine overwhelmingly predominant, representative statistical samples of the population surveyed by KIIS in 2020, 2021, and 2022 reported 0% of respondents identifying with Judaism and Islam. An older survey by the Razumkov Center in 2018 estimated Jews in Ukraine at 0.4% of the population, with smaller 0.1% minorities following Hinduism, Buddhism and Paganism (Rodnovery). According to the surveys conducted by Razumkov in the 2000s and early 2010s, such proportions have remained relatively constant throughout the last decade, while the proportion of believers overall has decreased from 76% in 2014 to 70% in 2016 and 72% in 2018.

As of 2022, Christianity was particularly strong in westernmost Ukrainian regions, where most Greek Catholics lived. In central, southern and eastern regions, Christians constitute a smaller proportion of the total population, particularly low in the easternmost region of Donbas. Another religion that is present in Ukraine besides Christianity is Rodnovery (Slavic native faith), which comprises Ukrainian- and Russian-language communities (some Rodnover organizations call the religion Orthodoxy (Ukrainian: Правосла́в'я, romanized: Pravoslávʺya), thus functioning in homonymy with Christian Orthodox churches).

Crimean Tatars professing Islam represent a significant part of the population in Crimea, which prior to 2014 was a subject of Ukraine, but has been since that year occupied by Russia. As of 2016, without Crimea, where Muslims formed 15% of the population in 2013, only Donbas maintains a larger community of Muslims compared to other Ukrainian regions (6%).

Since before the outbreak of the war in Donbas in 2014, but even more violently so from that year onward, there has been unrest between pro-Ukrainian and pro-Russian religious groups in the country.

After the 2022 Russian invasion of Ukraine, Ukraine President Volodymyr Zelenskyy "signed a decree enacting a National Security and Defense Council decision to impose personal sanctions against representatives of religious organizations associated with Russia". Ukraine's government will specifically examine the Ukrainian Orthodox Church of the Moscow Patriarchate and ban any activities relating to pro-Russian movement.

== History ==
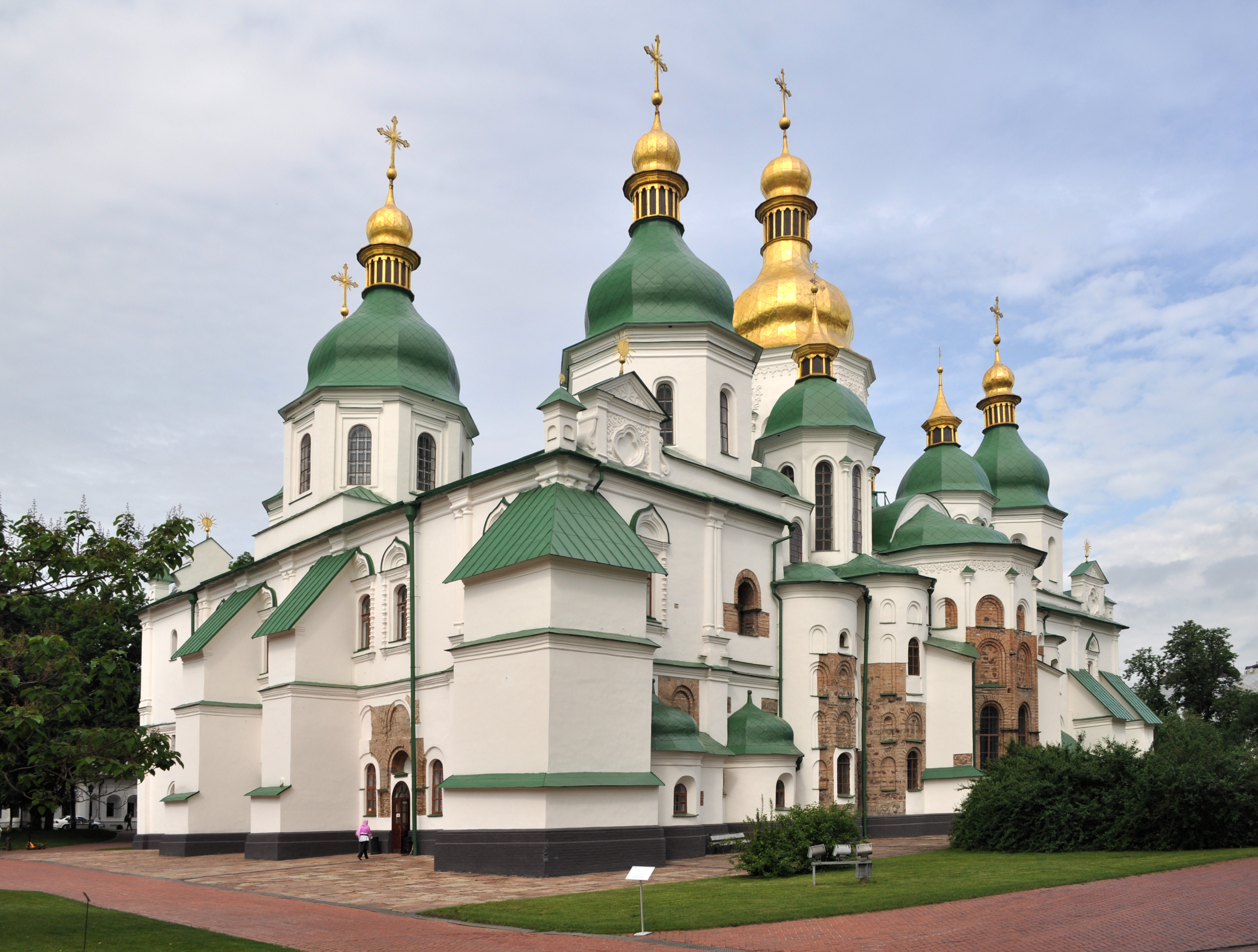
Saint Sophia's Cathedral, Kyiv is a UNESCO World Heritage Site

In pre-historic times and in the Early Middle Ages, the territories of present-day Ukraine supported different tribes practising their traditional pagan religions (though note for example the Tengrism of Old Great Bulgaria in present-day Ukraine in the 7th century. Byzantine Rite Christianity first became prominent about the turn of the first millennium. Later traditions and legends relate that in the first century CE the Apostle Andrew himself had visited the site where the city of Kyiv would later arise.

In the 10th century the emerging state of Kievan Rus' came increasingly under the cultural influence of the Byzantine Empire. The first recorded convert to Eastern Orthodoxy, Saint Olga, visited Constantinople in 945 or 957. In the 980s, according to tradition, Olga's grandson, Vladimir, had his people baptised in the Dnieper River.

This began a long history of the dominance of Eastern Orthodoxy in Ruthenia, a religious ascendancy that would later influence both Ukraine and Russia. Domination of Little Russia by Great Russia (from 1721) eventually led to the decline of Uniate Catholicism (officially founded in 1596 during Polish rule) in the Ukrainian lands under Tsarist control.

Judaism has existed in the territories of present-day Ukraine for approximately 2,000 years: Jewish traders appeared in Greek colonies. After the 7th century Judaism influenced the neighbouring Khazar Khaganate. From the 13th century Ashkenazi Jewish presence in Ukraine increased significantly. In the 18th century a new teaching of Judaism originated and became established in the Ukrainian lands – Hasidism.

The Golden Horde (which adopted Islam in 1313) and the Sunni Ottoman Empire (which conquered the Ukrainian littoral in the 1470s) brought Islam to their subject territories in present-day Ukraine. Crimean Tatars accepted Islam as the state religion (1313–1502) of the Golden Horde, and later ruled as vassals of the Ottoman Empire (until the late 18th century).

During the period of Soviet rule (c. 1917–1991) the governing Soviet authorities officially promoted atheism and taught it in schools, while promoting various levels of persecution of religious believers and of their organizations. Only a small fraction of people remained official church-goers in that period, and the number of non-believers increased.

The 20th century saw schisms within Eastern Orthodoxy in Ukrainian territory.

== Demographics ==
As of 2022, according to a survey by the Kyiv International Institute of Sociology (KIIS), 85% of Ukrainians identified as Christians. 72% identified themselves with Eastern Orthodoxy, 9% to the Catholic Church (8% Eastern Catholic, 1% Latin Church) and 4% adherents of a Protestant Church or other Christian movement.

Approximately 3 in 5 Ukrainians (58%) reported affiliation with one of the major Eastern Orthodox Church bodies in Ukraine, while 14% identified as Orthodox Christians without specifying affiliation to a church patriarchate. A significant shift in Orthodox identity occurred in the wake of the February 2022 Russian invasion of Ukraine. The July 2022 KIIS survey found only 1 in 25 of Ukrainians (4%) identified with the Ukrainian Orthodox Church of the Moscow Patriarchate (UOC-MP), a considerable drop from nearly 1/5 (18%) in June 2021 and 15% in June 2020 recorded in the same KIIS polling in the preceding years. The decline was geographically uniform: UOC-MP peaked in Eastern Ukraine at 6%, only slightly above 3-5% reached elsewhere in the country. Likewise, among ethnic Ukrainians, there was little variance: 3% of Ukrainian-speakers, 4% of bilingual Ukrainians, and 6% of Russian-speakers identified with the UOC-MP; only rising to 13% among Russian-speaking ethnic Russians living in Ukraine.

Conversely, in 2022 more than half of Ukrainians (54%) identified with the autocephalous Orthodox Church of Ukraine (OCU), up from 42% in 2021 and 34% in 2020. OCU identification was most predominant in Central Ukraine (59%) and Southern Ukraine (57%). OCU affiliation included strong majorities of Ukrainian-speaking Ukrainians (58%) and bilingual Ukrainians (53%), but also encompassed significant minorities of Russian-speaking Ukrainians (46%) and Russian-speaking Russians (36%).

Consequent upon the sharp decline in UOC-MP affiliation, in 2022 the Catholic Church in Ukraine was the second-largest church body in the country, counting nearly 1 in 10 Ukrainians as adherents; the overwhelming majority members of the Ukrainian Greek Catholic Church. Catholics were heavily concentrated in Western Ukraine, where more than 1 in 4 Ukrainians (28%) identified with Catholicism, compared to only 1-2% elsewhere. Catholic identity was also highest (14%) among Ukrainian-speaking ethnic Ukrainians.

A 2018 survey conducted by the Razumkov Centre found that 71.7% of the total respondents declared to be believers, while 11.5% were uncertain whether they believed or not, 5.3% were uninterested in beliefs, 4.7% were unbelievers, 3.0% were atheists, and a further 3.7% found it difficult to answer the question.

About 67.3% of the population declared adherence to one or another strand of Orthodox Christianity (28.7% of the Kyiv Patriarchate, 23.4% just Orthodox, 12.8% of the Moscow Patriarchate, 0.3% Ukrainian Autocephalous Orthodox Church, and 1.9% other types of Orthodoxy), 7.7% just Christians, 9.4% Ukrainian Greek Catholics, 2.2% Protestants and 0.8% Latin Catholic. Judaism was the religion of 0.4%; while Buddhism, Paganism and Hinduism were each the religions of 0.1% of the population. A further 11.0% declared themselves non-religious or unaffiliated.

Among those Ukrainians who declared to believe in Orthodoxy, 42.6% declared to be members of the Ukrainian Orthodox Church of the Kyivan Patriarchate, while 19.0% declared to be members of the Ukrainian Orthodox Church of the Moscovian Patriarchate. A further 0.5% were members of the Ukrainian Autocephalous Orthodox Church. Among the remaining Orthodox Ukrainians, 34.7% declared to be "just Orthodox", without affiliation to any patriarchate, while a further 2.8% declared that they "did not know" which patriarchate or Orthodox church they belonged to.

=== Beliefs ===
Changes over time and region in the proportions of people in Ukraine identifying themselves as believers, etc.
Whether you attend church or not, who do you think you are?	Ukraine							2016 survey split by region				
Whether you attend church or not, who do you think you are?	2000	2010	2013	2014	2016	2017	2018	West	Centre	South	East	Donbas
Believers	57.8%	71.4%	67.0%	76.0%	70.4%	67.1%	71.7%	91.0%	73.5%	65.7%	55.6%	57.2%
Those who hesitate between belief and disbelief	22.5%	11.5%	14.7%	7.9%	10.1%	11.7%	11.5%	4.7%	7.3%	8.3%	14.2%	19.5%
Not a believer	11.9%	7.9%	5.5%	4.7%	6.3%	4.1%	4.7%	0.9%	4.8%	7.4%	13.4%	7.2%
Atheists	3.2%	1.4%	2.0%	2.5%	2.7%	2.5%	3.0%	0.2%	2.6%	3.2%	3.5%	5.0%
Do not care	2.6%	4.4%	5.1%	4.9%	7.2%	8.2%	5.3%	1.2%	8.0%	13.0%	7.3%	9.4%
Difficult to answer	2.0%	3.3%	5.7%	3.9%	3.9%	6.3%	3.7%	1.9%	3.8%	2.3%	5.9%	1.6%

=== Beliefs and religions ===
Whether you attend church or not, who do you think you are? % of respondents
	Ukraine	Ukrainian Orthodox Church (Moscow Patriarchate)	Ukrainian Orthodox Church (Kyiv Patriarchate)	Other Orthodox	Ukrainian Greek Catholic Church	Just Christian	Other denominations	Do not belong to any religion
Believers	70.4%	88.1%	88.5%	74.1%	96.9%	55.2%	89.2%	11.8%
Those who hesitate between belief and disbelief	10.1%	5.9%	7.1%	12.5%	3.1%	20.3%	3.2%	14.5%
Not a believer	6.3%	1.0%	0.4%	3.5%	0.0%	4.2%	1.1%	29.4%
Atheists	2.7%	0.7%	0.2%	0.6%	0.0%	0.0%	4.3%	13.6%
Do not care	7.2%	2.3%	1.8%	5.8%	0.0%	10.5%	0.0%	25.5%
Difficult to answer	3.9%	2.0%	2.0%	3.5%	0.0%	9.8%	2.2%	5.2%

=== Religions by year ===
	2000	2005	Nov 2010	Mar 2013	Apr 2014	Feb 2015	July 2015	Mar 2016	Nov 2016	Apr 2018
Orthodox	66.0%	60.8%	68.1%	70.6%	70.2%	73.7%	78%	65.4%	64.7%	67.3%
Latin Catholic	0.5%	1.6%	0.4%	1.3%	1.0%	0.8%	10% (including Greek)	1.0%	0.8%	0.8%
Greek Catholic	7.6%	7.6%	7.6%	5.7%	7.8%	8.1%	-	6.5%	8.2%	9.4%
Protestant (Note: Protestant, including evangelical churches (ie: Seventh-day Adventists, Jehovah's Witnesses, Lutheran, Evangelical Christians, Evangelical Baptists, Christians of Evangelical Pentecostal and similar, Full Gospel Church and other charismatic communities, and Mormons).)	2.0%	1.3%	1.9%	0.8%	1.0%	0.9%	4%	2.2% (other Christian)	1.9%	2.2%
Jewish	0.3%	0.2%	0.1%	0.3%	0.1%	-	-	0.2%	0.2%	0.4%
Islam	0.7%	0.4%	0.9%	0.7%	0.2%	-	<1%	1.1%	0.0%	0.0%
Buddhist	0.1%	0.0%	0.1%	0.0%	0.2%	-	-	0.0%	0.2%	0.1%
Hindu	0.0%	0.0%	0.0%	0.1%	0.0%	-	-	0.2%	0.0%	0.1%
Pagan	0.1%	0.0%	0.0%	0.1%	0.0%	-	-	0.0%	0.1%	0.1%
Just Christian	6.9%	15.8%	7.2%	8.6%	6.3%	8.5%	-	7.1%	12.7%	7.7%
Other	0.5%	0.2%	0.2%	0.0%	0.0%	0.7%	1%	0.2%	0.3%	0.1%
Do not consider myself to be any of these creeds' religions	15.3%	11.8%	13.2%	11.3%	12.5%	6.1%	7%	16.3%	11.4%	11.0%
No answer	-	0.2%	0.3%	0.5%	0.7%	1.1% difficult to answer	-	0.0%	0.2%	0.9%
Sample size				2010	2012	25000	2409	2018	2018	2018

=== Religions by region ===
Religions by regions of Ukraine (Razumkov 2016)
Religion	West (Note: West: Chernivtsi, Ivano-Frankivsk, Lviv, Rivne, Ternopil, Volyn and Zakarpattia Oblasts.)	Center (Note: Center: Cherkasy, Chernihiv, Khmelnytsky, Kirovohrad, Poltava, Sumy, Vinnytsia, Zhytomyr, and Kyiv Oblasts, and the self-governing city of Kyiv.)	South (Note: South: Kherson, Mykolaiv, and Odesa Oblasts.)	East (Note: East: Dnipropetrovsk, Kharkiv, and Zaporizhzhia Oblasts.)	Donbas (Note: Donbas: Donetsk and Luhansk Oblasts (excluding the occupied areas).)
Orthodox	57.0%	76.7%	71.0%	63.2%	50.6%
Latin Catholic	1.4%	1.9%	0.5%	0.3%	∅
Greek Catholic	29.9%	0.4%	0.5%	∅	∅
Protestant	3.6%	1.0%	0.5%	1.9%	2.5%
Jewish	0.2%	0.3%	0.5%	0.3%	∅
Muslim	∅	0.1%	∅	0.5%	6.0%
Hindu	∅	∅	∅	0.3%	0.6%
Just Christian	4.8%	6.5%	5.1%	8.1%	11.9%
Others	∅	0.1%	0.5%	0.8%	∅
Not affiliated to the religions listed above	3.1%	12.7%	21.7%	24.7%	28.3%

=== Religions by oblast ===
A February 2015 survey by Razumkov Centre, SOCIS, Rating and KIIS gave the following data at oblast level:

Oblast	Region (Note: Region as defined in other surveys by the Razumkov Center.)	Orthodox	Greek Catholic	Latin Catholic	Protestant	Christian (unspecified)	Not religious	Difficult to answer (incl. others)
Cherkasy Oblast	Center	89%	0.5%	0.5%	1%	5%	3%	1%
Chernihiv Oblast	Center	87%	0%	0%	0%	9%	2%	2%
Chernivtsi Oblast	West	86%	2%	1%	2%	5%	2%	2%
Dnipropetrovsk Oblast	East	83%	0%	0.5%	0.5%	9%	5%	2%
Donetsk Oblast	Donbas	69%	0%	0%	1%	15%	10%	5%
Ivano-Frankivsk Oblast	West	35%	57%	1%	1%	6%	0%	0%
Kharkiv Oblast	East	76%	0%	0%	1%	13%	8%	2%
Kherson Oblast	South	75%	0.5%	0.5%	1%	10%	10%	3%
Khmelnytskyi Oblast	Center	78%	2%	3%	2%	6%	7%	2%
Kyiv	Center	79%	1%	1%	1%	6%	11%	1%
Kyiv Oblast	Center	80%	0.5%	0.5%	1%	9%	7%	2%
Kirovohrad Oblast	Center	76%	0.5%	0%	0.5%	17%	5%	1%
Luhansk Oblast	Donbas	71%	0.5%	0%	0.5%	8%	18%	2%
Lviv Oblast	West	30%	59%	2%	1%	6%	1%	1%
Mykolaiv Oblast	South	80%	0%	0%	0%	6%	11%	1%
Odesa Oblast	South	84%	0.5%	0%	0.5%	6%	6%	1%
Poltava Oblast	Center	66%	1%	0%	1%	26%	5%	1%
Rivne Oblast	West	91%	1%	1%	5%	2%	0%	0%
Sumy Oblast	Center	85%	0.5%	1%	0.5%	7%	5%	1%
Ternopil Oblast	West	36%	52%	3%	3%	6%	0%	0%
Vinnytsia Oblast	Center	84%	0.5%	1%	0.5%	7%	6%	1%
Volyn Oblast	West	97%	1%	0.5%	1%	0.5%	0%	0%
Zakarpattia Oblast	West	68%	19%	7%	1%	3%	1%	1%
Zaporizhzhia Oblast	East	73%	0%	0%	0%	10%	16%	1%
Zhytomyr Oblast	Center	85%	0.5%	1%	0.5%	7%	5%	1%

=== Types of Orthodoxy ===
Breakdown of Orthodoxy in Ukraine (Razumkov 2016)
Type of Orthodoxy	% of Orthodox	% of total population
Orthodox of the Kyivan Patriarchate	38.1%	25.0%
Orthodox of the Moscovian Patriarchate	23.0%	15.0%
Ukrainian Autocephalous Orthodox Church	2.7%	1.8%
Just Orthodox	32.3%	21.2%
Do not know	3.1%	2.0%

Orthodoxy by year
	2000	2005	2010	2013	2014	2016	2018
Orthodox	66.0%	60.8%	68.1%	70.6%	70.2%	65.4%	67.3%
Moscow Patriarchate	9.2%	10.6%	23.6%	19.6%	17.4%	15.0%	12.8%
Kyiv Patriarchate	12.1%	14.0%	15.1%	18.3%	22.4%	25.0%	28.7% (Note: Prior to the merged into the [National] Ukrainian Orthodox Church)
Autocephalous	1.3%	0.8%	0.9%	0.8%	0.7%	1.8%	0.3%
Just Orthodox	38.6%	33.4%	25.9%	28.8%	28.1%	21.2%	23.4%
Orthodox do not know which denomination	4.6%	1.9%	1.6%	2.5%	1.4%	2.0%	1.9%
Missing	0.2%	0.1%	1.0%	0.6%	0.2%	0.4%	???

=== Current religious denominations (2020-2022) ===
Religion and denomination by year (KIIS 2022)
Religion	2020	2021	2022
Orthodox Christian	71%	72%	72%
Orthodox Church of Ukraine	34%	42%	54%
UOC-Moscow Patriarchate	15%	18%	4%
Orthodox without specification	22%	12%	14%
Catholic Christian	9%	10%	9%
Ukrainian Greek Catholic Church	8%	9%	8%
Roman Catholic (Latin Church)	1%	1%	1%
Protestant/Other Christian	3%	4%	4%
Christian	83%	86%	85%
Atheist	8%	7%	10%
Other	1%	4%	3%
Difficult to say	6%	2%	2%

=== Denomination by region (2022) ===
Denomination by region of Ukraine (KIIS 2022)
Religion	West (Note: West: Chernivtsi, Ivano-Frankivsk, Khmelnytsky, Lviv, Rivne, Ternopil, Volyn and Zakarpattia Oblasts.)	Center (Note: Center: Cherkasy, Chernihiv, Kirovohrad, Poltava, Sumy, Vinnytsia, Zhytomyr, and Kyiv Oblasts, and the self-governing city of Kyiv.)	South (Note: South: Dnipropetrovsk, Kherson, Mykolaiv, Odesa and Zaporizhzhia Oblasts)	East (Note: East: Donetsk, Kharkiv, and Luhansk Oblasts.)
Orthodox Church of Ukraine	50%	59%	57%	42%
Orthodox without specification	6%	13%	17%	26%
Atheist	4%	11%	12%	17%
Greek Catholic	26%	1%	1%	∅
Orthodox-Moscow Patriarchate	3%	4%	5%	6%
Protestant	4%	2%	2%	2%
Other Christian	1%	2%	2%	1%
Latin Catholic	2%	1%	∅	∅
Other	1%	3%	3%	5%
Difficult to say	1%	4%	2%	2%

=== Denomination by language and ethnicity (2022) ===
Denomination by language and ethnicity (KIIS 2022)
Religion	Ukrainian-speaking Ukrainians	Bilingual Ukrainians	Russian-speaking Ukrainians	Russian-speaking Russians
Orthodox Church of Ukraine	58%	53%	46%	36%
Orthodox without specification	10%	18%	18%	27%
Atheist	6%	15%	17%	14%
Greek Catholic	13%	∅	1%	∅
Orthodox-Moscow Patriarchate	3%	4%	6%	13%
Protestant	2%	3%	3%	2%
Other Christian	2%	∅	1%	1%
Latin Catholic	1%	∅	∅	2%
Other	2%	2%	6%	5%
Difficult to say	2%	4%	2%	∅

== Christianity ==
As of 2022, 85% of the population of Ukraine professed belief in Christianity.

=== Eastern Orthodoxy ===
According to the same survey, 72% of the total population adhered to Orthodox Christianity. Orthodoxy comprises about three-quarters of the population in Eastern (74%), Central (76%), and Southern Ukraine (79%), whereas Orthodoxy makes up the lowest proportion of the population in Western Ukraine (59%).

From 1992 to 2018, there have been three Orthodox churches active in the independent Ukraine following the dissolution of the USSR:

- the Ukrainian Orthodox Church – Kyiv Patriarchate (UOC-KP),
- the Ukrainian Autocephalous Orthodox Church (UAOC), and
- the Ukrainian Orthodox Church (Moscow Patriarchate) (UOC-MP).

The UAOC and the UOC-KP were not recognized by other Orthodox churches and were considered 'schismatic'.

On 11 October 2018, the excommunications of the UAOC and the UOC-KP were lifted by the Ecumenical Patriarchate, the Ecumenical Patriarchate also announced it would grant autocephaly to the Orthodox faithfuls in Ukraine. However, the Ecumenical Patriarchate recognized neither the UAOC nor the UOC-KP as legitimate and their leaders were not recognized as primates of their respective churches. The Ecumenical Patriarchate declared that it recognized the sacraments performed by the UOC-KP and the UAOC as valid.

On 15 December 2018, members of the Ukrainian Orthodox Church – Kyiv Patriarchate, the Ukrainian Autocephalous Orthodox Church, and parts of the Ukrainian Orthodox Church (Moscow Patriarchate), voted during an unification council through their representatives (bishops) to unite into the Orthodox Church of Ukraine on the basis of complete canonical independence. They elected their primate, Epiphanius of Kyiv, and adopted a charter for the Orthodox Church of Ukraine during the same unification council. On 5 January 2019, Ecumenical Patriarch Bartholomew and Metropolitan Epiphanius celebrated a Divine Liturgy in St. George's Cathedral in Istanbul; the tomos granting autocephaly to the Orthodox Church of Ukraine was signed thereafter, also in St. George's Cathedral.

On 27 May 2022, the Ukrainian Orthodox Church (Moscow Patriarchate) formally cut ties and declared independence from the Russian Orthodox Church. On August 20, 2024, the Verkhovna Rada of Ukraine banned the Russian Orthodox Church in Ukraine by adopting the Law of Ukraine "On the Protection of the Constitutional Order in the Sphere of Activities of Religious Organizations". Ukrainian religious organizations affiliated with the Russian Orthodox Church will be banned 9 months from the moment the State Service of Ukraine for Ethnopolicy and Freedom of Conscience issues the order, if this religious organization does not sever relations with the Russian Orthodox Church in accordance with Orthodox canon law. This prohibition did not extend to Eastern Orthodoxy in general, contrary to what some online claims asserted.

==== Orthodox Church of Ukraine ====
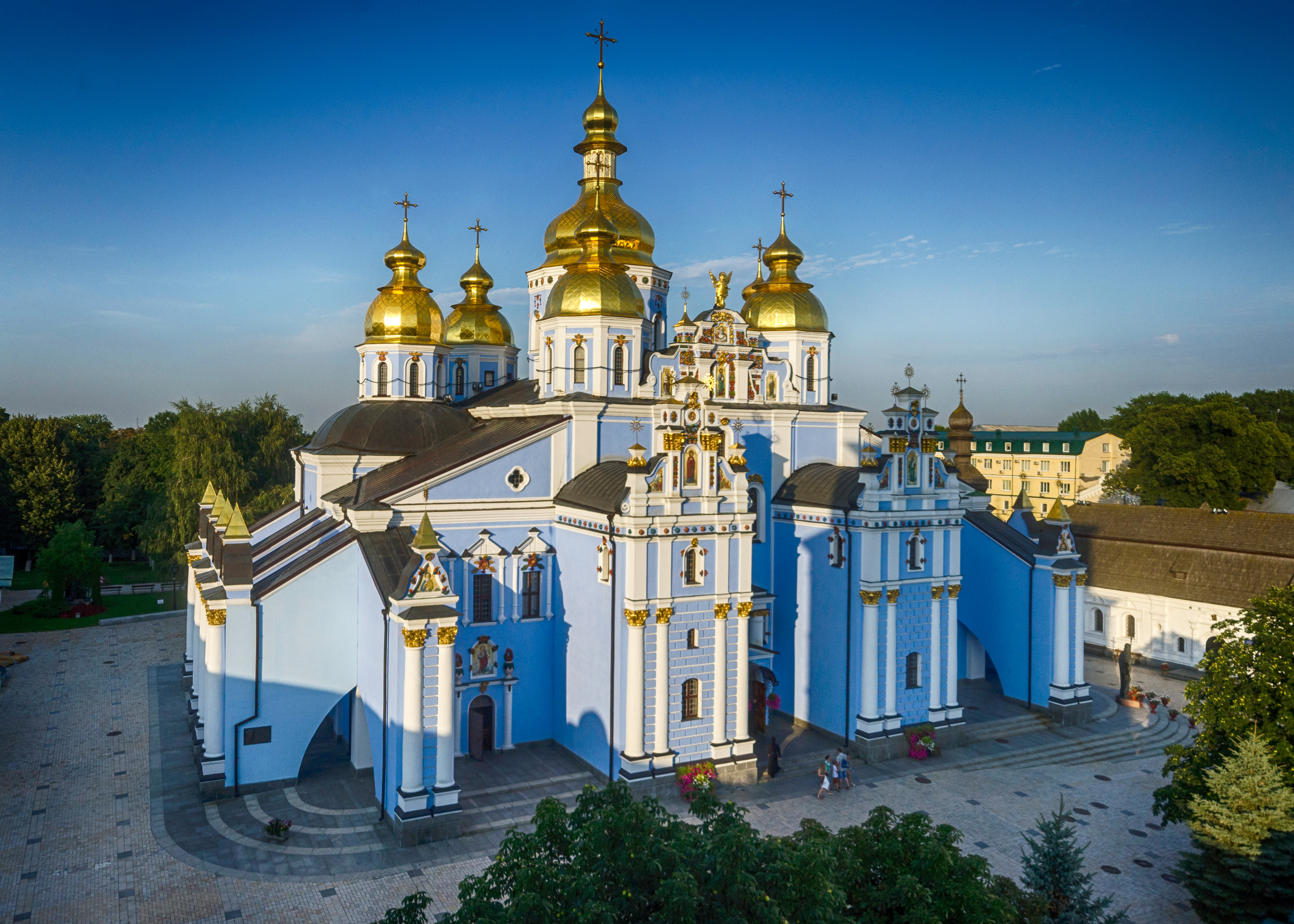
St. Michael's Golden-Domed Monastery in Kyiv, a residence of the Metropolitan of the Orthodox Church of Ukraine

The Orthodox Church of Ukraine (OCU) is recently formed national Orthodox Church from Unification council in December 2018, After mergers from Ukrainian Orthodox Church—Kyiv Patriarchate, Ukrainian Autocephalous Orthodox Church and parts of Ukrainian Orthodox Church (Moscow Patriarchate). The title of its primate is "His Beatitude (name), Metropolitan of Kyiv and all Ukraine". The church uses Ukrainian as its liturgical language.

==== Ukrainian Orthodox Church ====
Prior to 2022, the Ukrainian Orthodox Church (UOC) was a constituent part of the Russian Orthodox Church (the Moscow Patriarchate). The UOC, like most Orthodox churches in Eastern Europe, predominantly uses Church Slavonic in church services.

In the week following the creation of the Orthodox Church of Ukraine (OCU) on 15 December 2018 several parishes announced they would leave the UOC and join the new church.

On 27 May 2022, the Ukrainian Orthodox Church formally cut ties and declared independence from the Russian Orthodox Church.

==== Other Orthodox Christian jurisdictions ====
Other Orthodox communities in Ukraine include:

- the Russian Orthodox Old-Rite Church and other Old Believers
- the Russian Orthodox Church Outside Russia
- the Ruthenian Orthodox Church
- various branches of the True Orthodox Church-Catacombism (including the Ruthenian True Orthodox Church, the Ukrainian True Orthodox Church and the Church of the Goths)
- the Romanian Orthodox Church (Metropolis of Bessarabia)
- the Ukrainian Autocephalous Orthodox Church Canonical

=== Oriental Orthodoxy ===
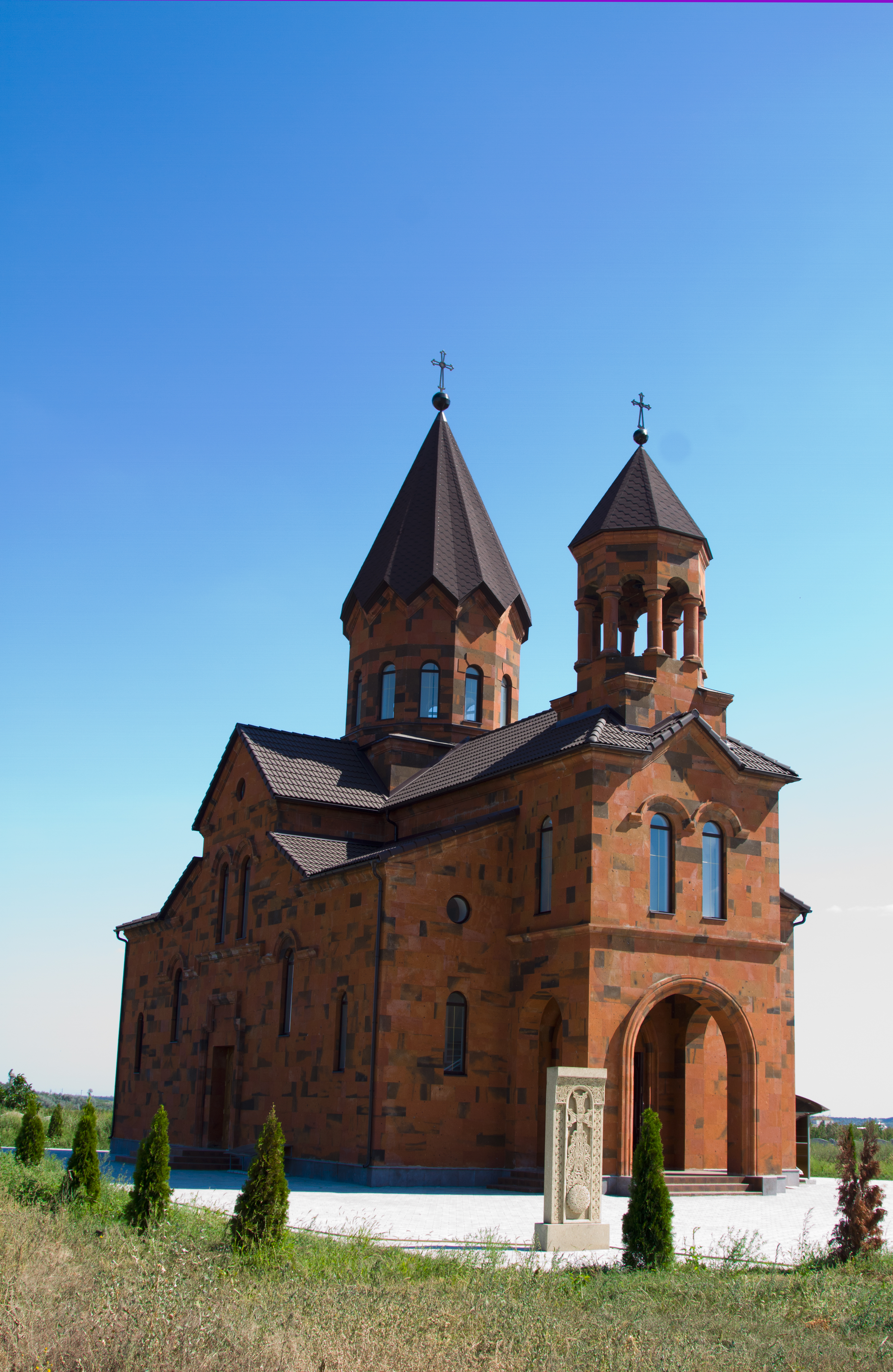
Armenian Church in Mykolaiv

Armenian Apostolic Church

Adherents of Oriental Orthodox Christianity in Ukraine are mainly ethnic Armenians. Historical ties between peoples of Ukraine and Armenia have resulted in significant presence of Armenian diaspora in Ukraine throughout history and up to the modern times. Most of ethnic Armenians in Ukraine are adherents of the Armenian Apostolic Church, one of main churches of the Oriental Orthodoxy, distinctive from Eastern Orthodoxy in terms of particular miaphysite christology. In spite of those theological differences, relations between Armenian Apostolic Church and various Eastern Orthodox Churches in Ukraine are friendly. There is an Armenian eparchy (diocese) in Ukraine, centered in Armenian Cathedral of Lviv, and also there are many Armenian churches and other monuments on the territory of Ukraine.

=== Catholicism ===
Byzantine Rite Eastern Catholicism is the religion of 9% of the population of Ukraine as of 2022. This church is largely concentrated in Western Ukraine, where it gathers a significant proportion of the population (28%). Latin Church Catholics compose 1% of the population of Ukraine, mostly in western (2%) and central (1%) regions. Catholicism is largely absent in eastern Ukraine and non-existent in Donbas.

As of 2016, there are 4,733 registered Catholic churches, among which 3,799 belong to the Ukrainian and Ruthenian Greek Catholic Churches and 933 belong to the Latin Church.

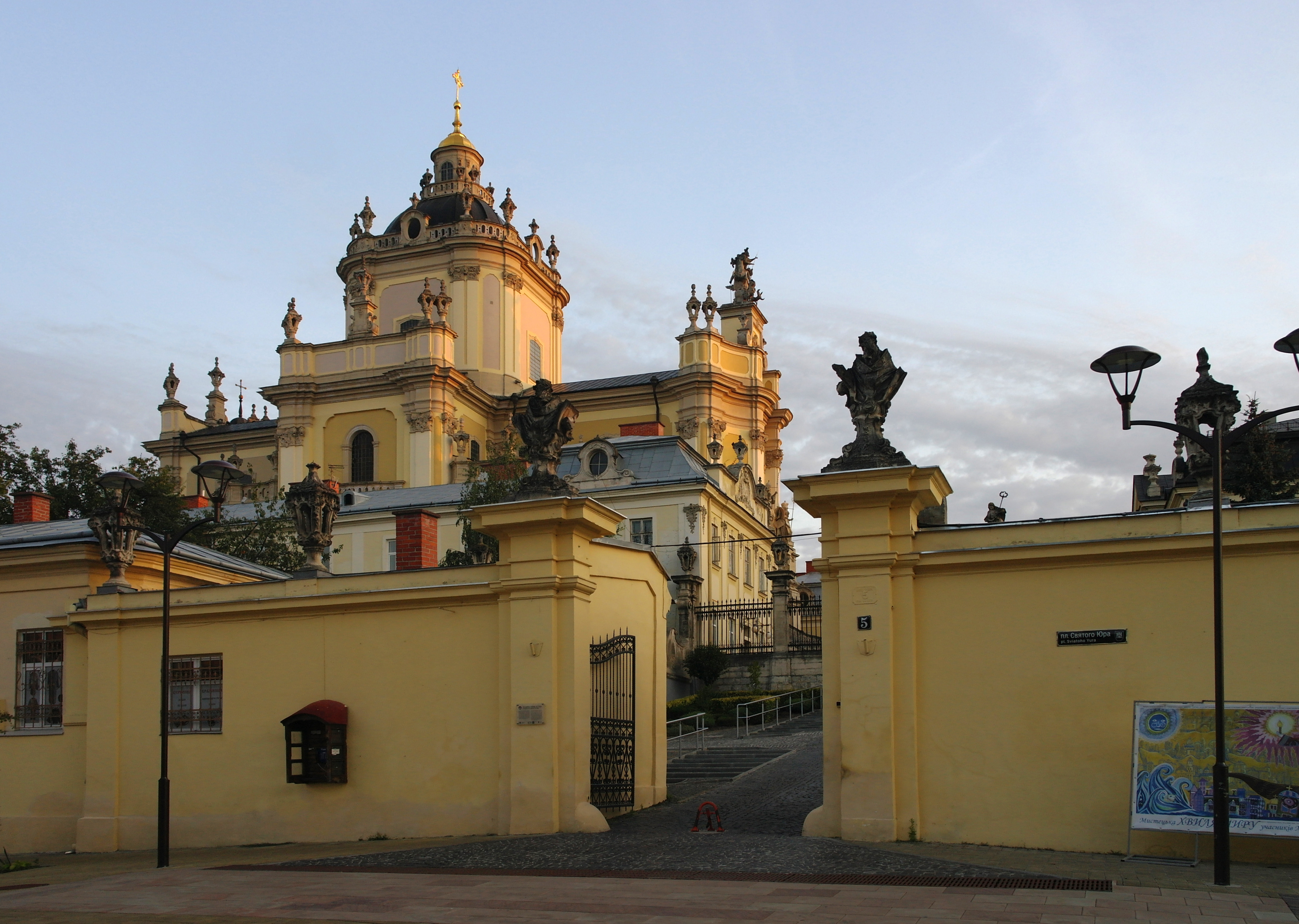
St. George's Cathedral, Lviv

==== Ukrainian Greek Catholic Church ====
The Ukrainian Greek Catholic Church traditionally constituted the second largest group of believers after the Christian Orthodox churches. The Union of Brest formed the Church in 1596 to unify Eastern Orthodox and Catholic believers. Outlawed by the Soviet Union in 1946 and legalized in 1987, the church was for forty-three years the single largest banned religious community in the world. Major Archbishop Sviatoslav Shevchuk is the present head of the Ukrainian Greek Catholic Church. The church uses Ukrainian as its liturgical language.

==== Latin Church ====
The Latin Church is traditionally associated with historical pockets of citizens of Polish ancestry who lived mainly in the central and western regions. It uses the Polish, Latin, Ukrainian and Russian as liturgical languages.

==== Ruthenian Greek Catholic Church ====
Main concentrations of the Ruthenian Greek Catholic Church are in Trans-Carpathia near the Hungarian border. This community has multiple ties in Hungary, Slovakia and the United States.

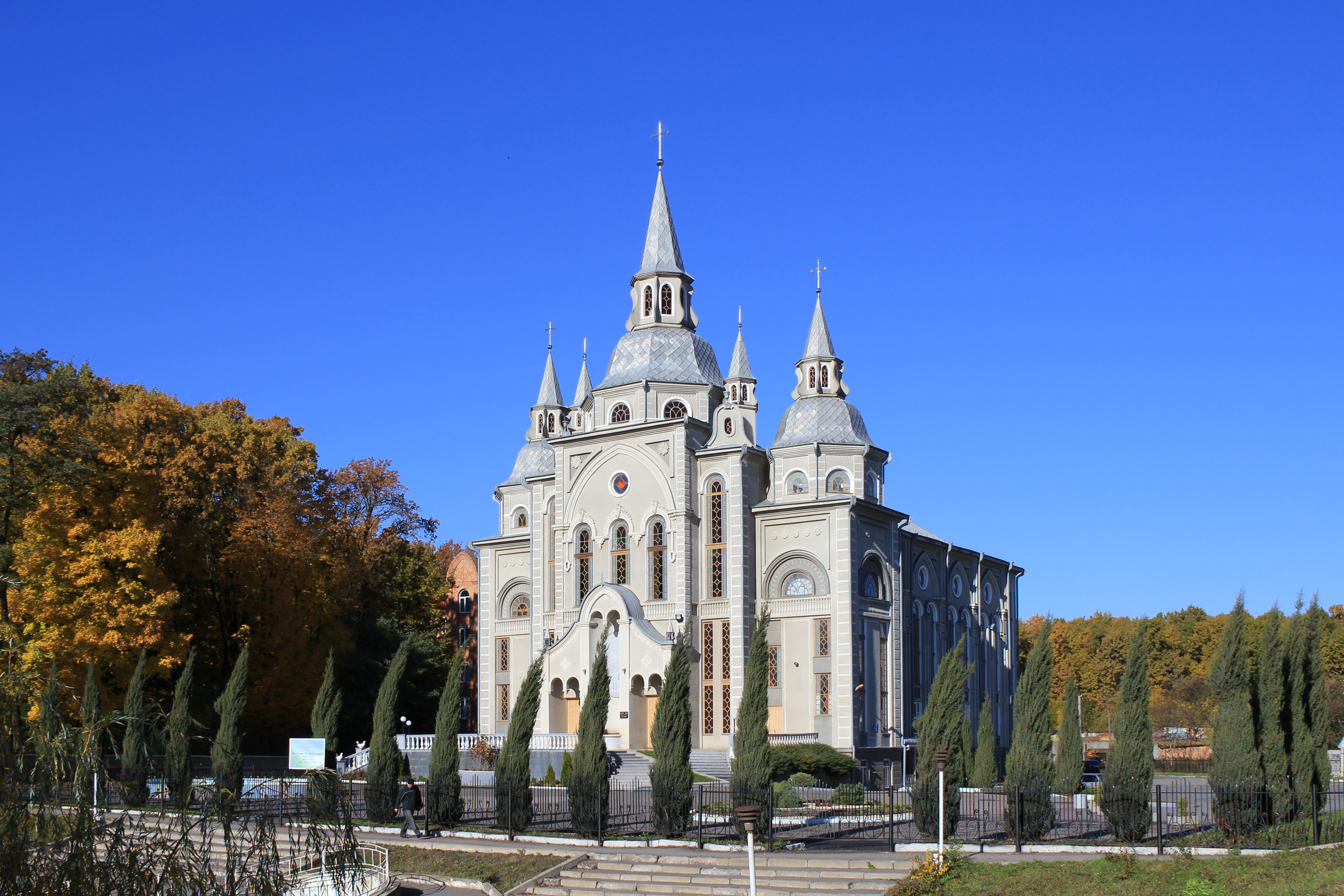
Baptist Church "House of the Gospel", Vinnytsia

=== Protestantism ===
As of 2022, Protestants make up 2% of the population of Ukraine, with the strongest concentration in Western Ukraine (4%). In the country there are communities of Baptists, Pentecostals, Charismatics, Evangelicals as well as Lutherans, Presbyterians, and others. There is also a Sub-Carpathian Reformed Church with about 140,000 members, which is one of the earliest Protestant communities in the country.

There are several Pentecostal associations in Ukraine: Ukrainian Pentecostal Church (Trinitarian Pentecostals) and United Pentecostal Church International (Oneness Pentecostalism). As of 2016, there are 2,973 Evangelical churches, 2,853 Baptist churches, 1,082 Seventh-day Adventist churches, 128 Calvinist churches, 79 Lutheran churches, 1,337 churches of Charismatic Christianity, and 1,347 other organizations belonging to the Protestant spectrum (including 928 Jehovah's Witnesses' halls and 44 Latter-day Saints congregations). In total, as of 2016, there are 9,799 registered Protestant groups in Ukraine.

=== Other denominations ===
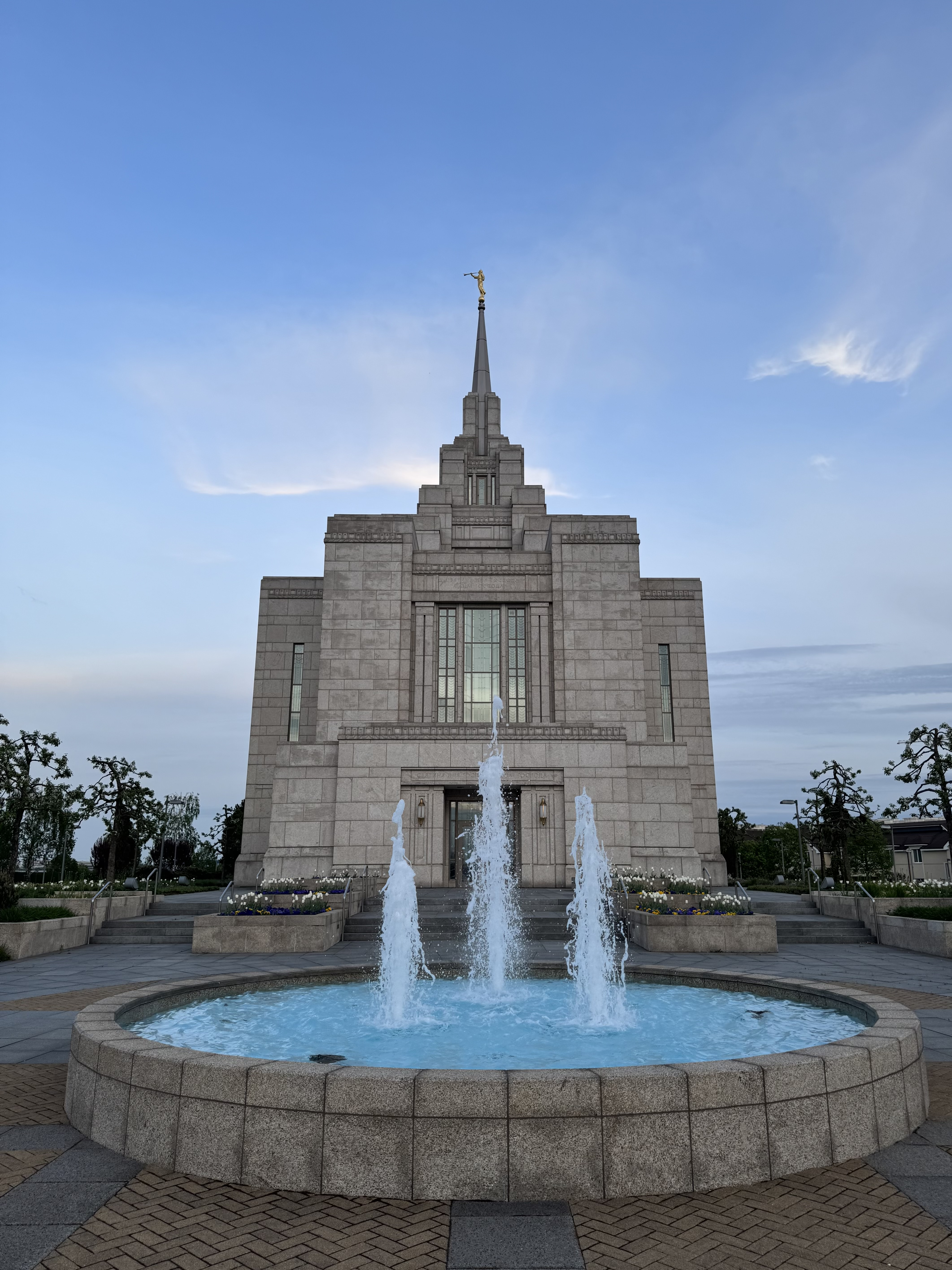
Kyiv Ukraine Temple of the Church of Jesus Christ of Latter-day Saints

Jehovah's Witnesses claim to have 265,985 adherents, as reported in the movement's 2013 Yearbook. In 2010 the Church of Jesus Christ of Latter-day Saints dedicated its Kyiv Ukraine Temple, and in 2012 claimed a membership more than 11,000 in 57 congregations in Ukraine.

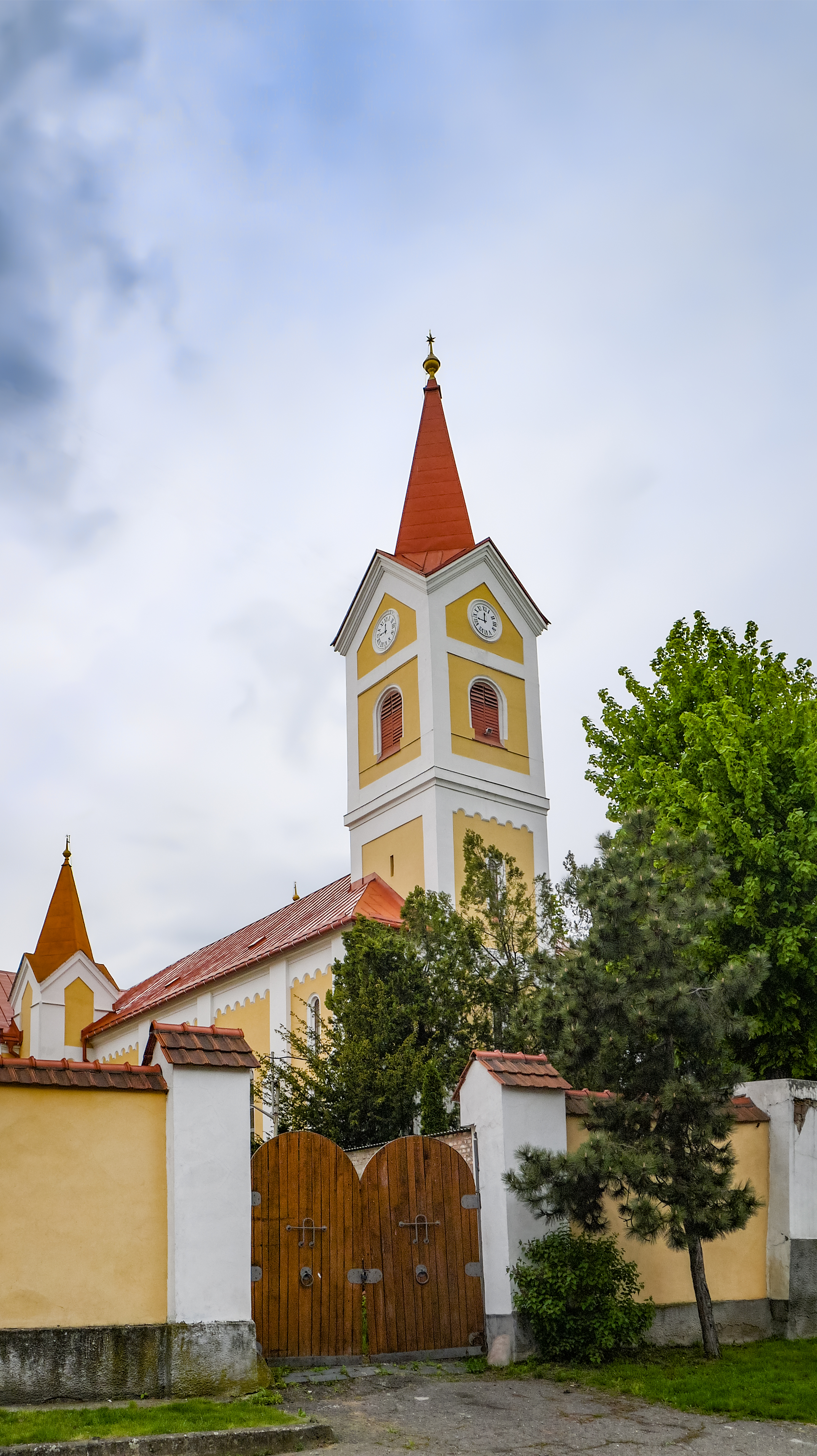
Reformed Church in Uzhhorod

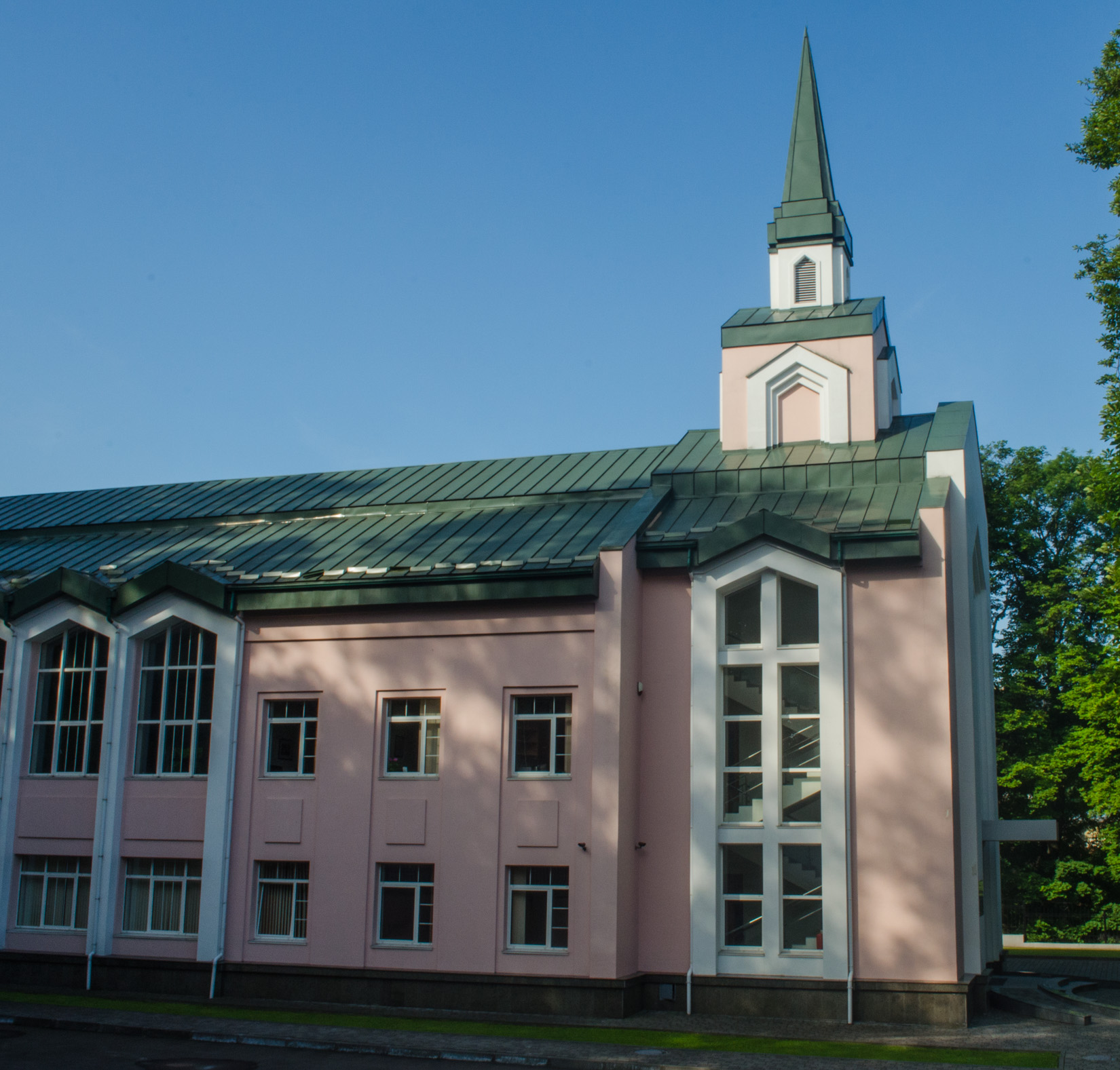
The meeting house of the Church of Jesus Christ of Latter-day Saints in Lviv

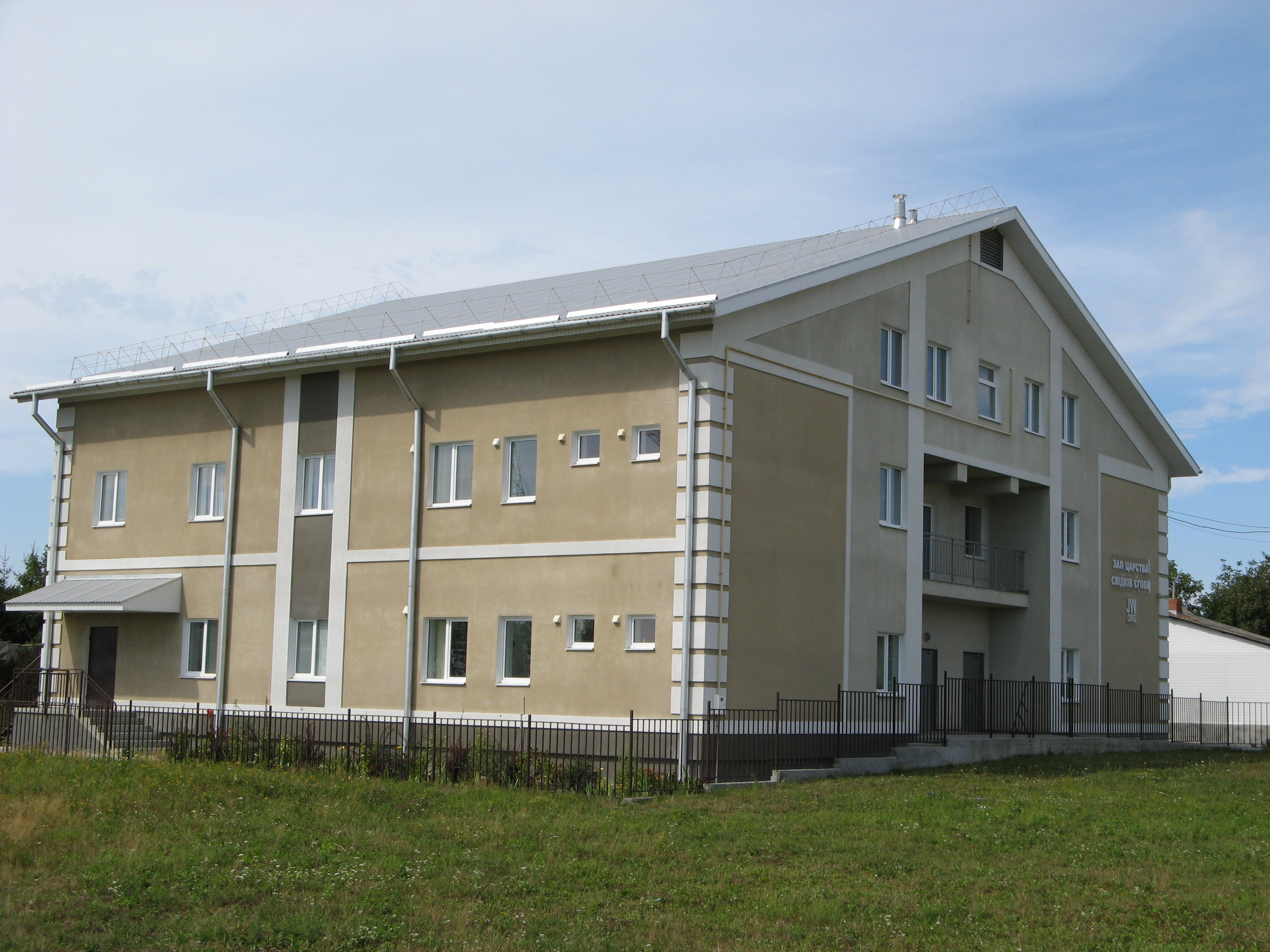
Kingdom Hall of Jehovah's Witnesses in the city of Lviv

== Islam ==
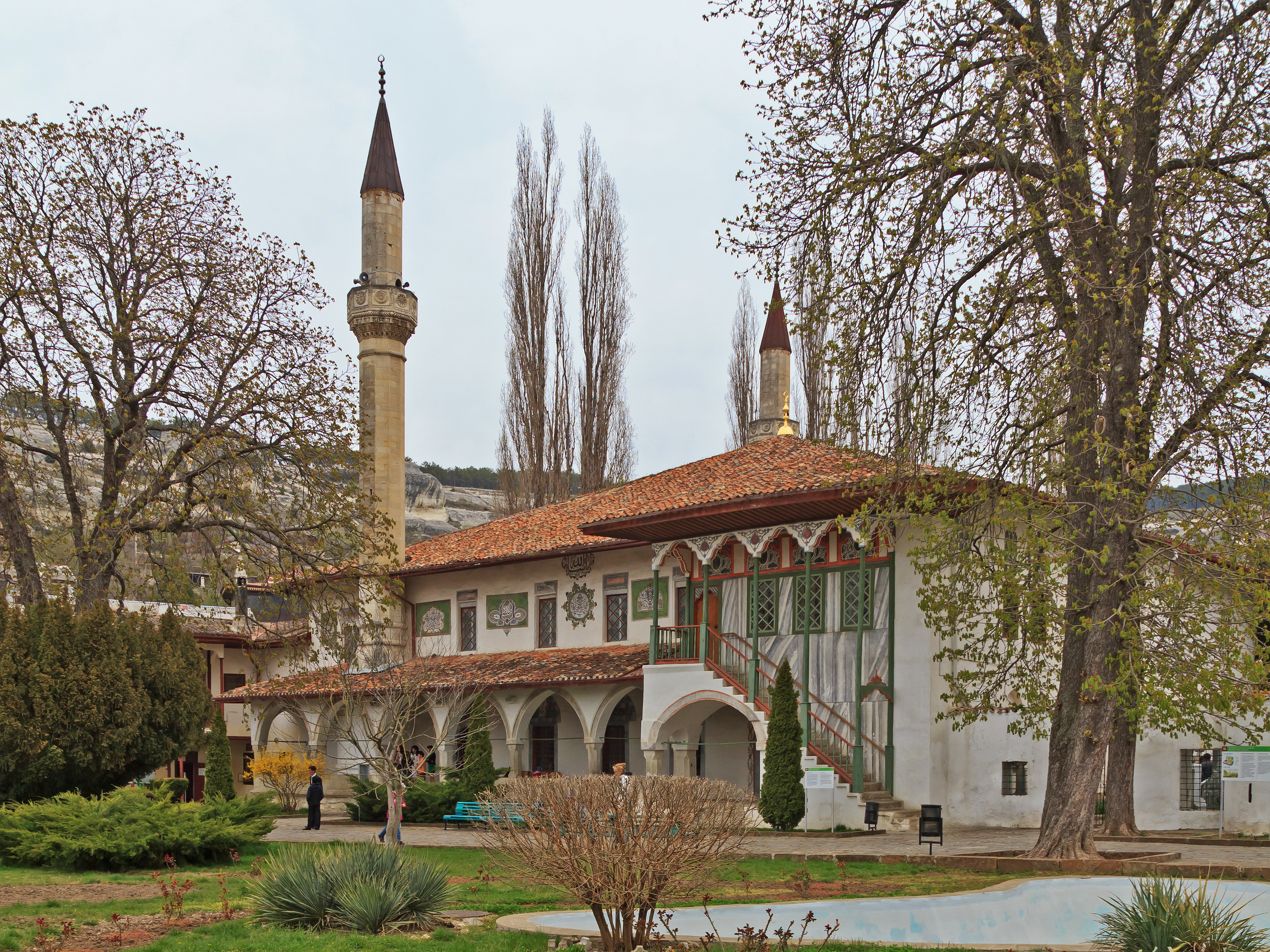
The Crimean Khan's palace at Hansaray was the center of Islam in Crimea for more than 300 years.

Islam in Ukraine is the second largest religion after Christianity. Islam has been present in Ukraine for hundreds of years.

Historically, there were two main ways of spreading Islam in Ukraine: the eastern (North Caucasus) and southern (Crimean Khanate and the Ottoman Empire).

Islam in Ukraine does not have any special specifics, it did not lead to the emergence of new trends, directions, groups, etc. Muslims in Ukraine overwhelmingly profess Sunnism.

As of 2016, Islam was the religion of 1.1% of the population of Ukraine. Muslims are mostly concentrated in Donbas, where they make up 6.0% of the population. In the same year, there are 229 registered Islamic organizations. In Crimea, which in 2014 was annexed by Russia, Crimean Tatar Muslims constitute as much as 25% of the population. A major part of the south steppes of modern Ukraine at a certain period of time were inhabited by Turkic peoples, most of whom were Muslims since the fall of the Khazar Khanate.

The Crimean Tatars are the only indigenous Muslim ethnic group in the country. The Nogays, another Muslim group who lived in the steppes of southern Ukraine, emigrated to Ottoman Empire in the 18th–19th century. In addition, there are Muslim communities in all major Ukrainian cities representing Soviet-era migrants from Muslim backgrounds. There are approximately 150 mosques in Ukraine.

Most of Ukraine's Muslims are Crimean Tatars. Then there are Turks, Chechens, Azerbaijanis, Arabs, Pashtuns.

In Ukraine, there is the Spiritual Administration of the Muslims of Crimea (Crimean Tatars), the Spiritual Administration of the Muslims of Ukraine and the Religious Administration of Muslims of Ukraine "Ummah".

== Judaism ==
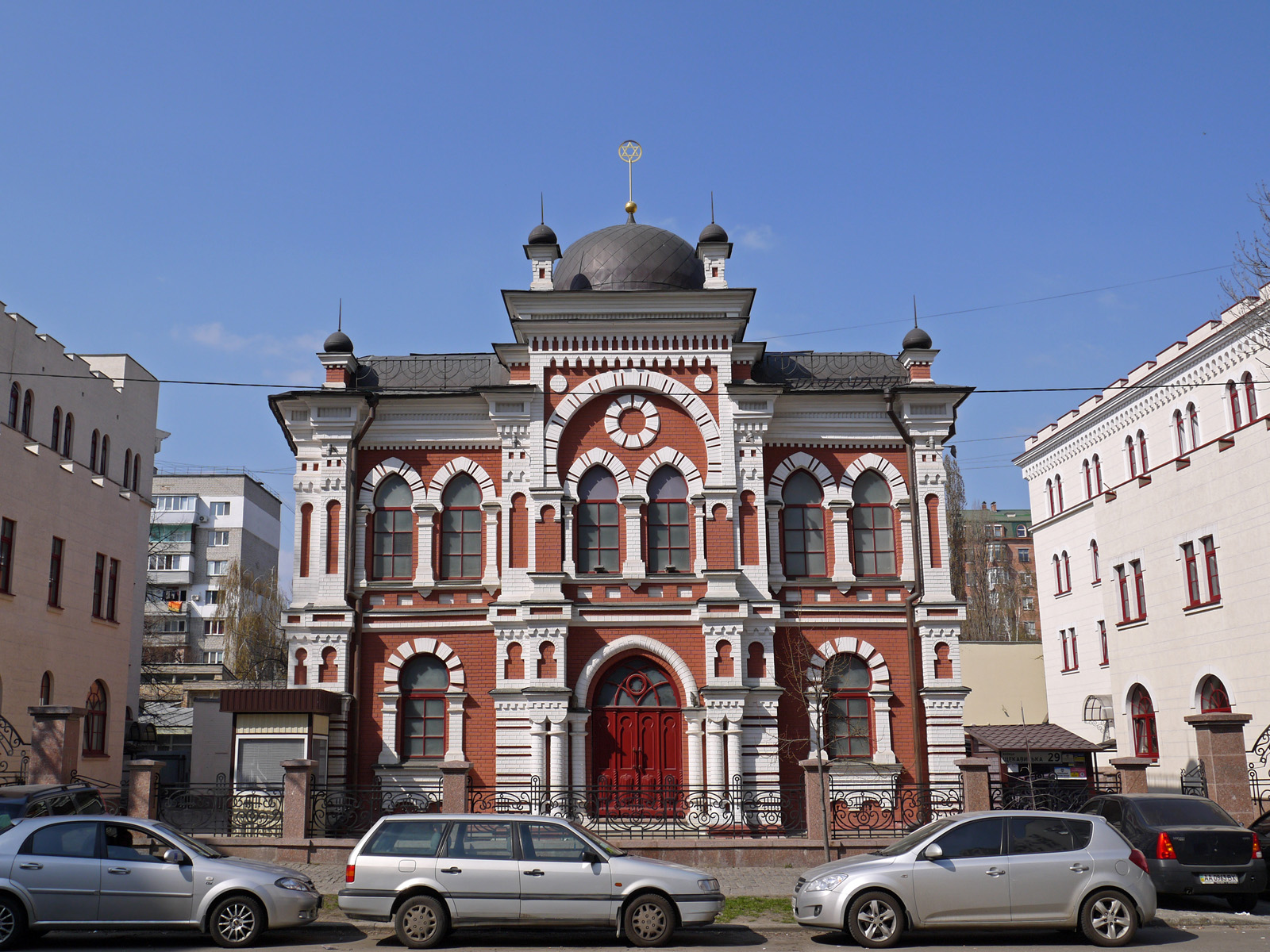
Great Choral Synagogue (Kyiv)

The size of the Jewish population of Ukraine has varied over time, with current estimates between 100,000 and 300,000. Jews in Ukraine primarily identify as such in an ethnic capacity, with only 35-40% identifying specifically as followers of Judaism. Ethnic Jews may be irreligious or practise religions other than Judaism. Most observant Jews subscribe to Orthodox Judaism, including Chabad-Lubavitch communities, while others practice Reform Judaism, Conservative Judaism or Reconstructionist Judaism.

The largest Jewish communities are in Kyiv (Rabbi Jonathan Markovitch), Dnipro (Rabbi Shmuel Kamintski), and Odesa (Rabbi Avraham Wolf).

Jewish congregations use Russian, Hebrew, Yiddish and Ukrainian languages. As of 2018, religious Jews constituted only 0.4% of the population of Ukraine, with 271 officially registered religious communities.

== Buddhism ==
Buddhism in Ukraine has existed since the 19th and 20th century, after immigration from countries with Buddhist populations, mainly North Vietnam and Korea under Communist period. Although sources are not readily available, Buddhists are believed to constitute 0.1% of the total population in Ukraine. At present, Ukraine is home to 58 formally registered Buddhist communities, but according to religious scientists there are probably 100 communities in Ukraine. The largest Buddhist communities in Ukraine belong to the Tibetan tradition. Most widespread are Karma Kagyu communities, of the Kagyu school.

== Hinduism ==
Hinduism is a minority faith in Ukraine. The International Society for Krishna Consciousness managed to propagate the Hindu faith through their missionary activities. As of 2018, Hindu believers constituted 0.1% of the population of Ukraine, with a slightly higher proportion in Western Ukraine (0.2%). In 2016, there were 85 Hindu, Hindu-inspired and other Eastern religions-inspired organizations in the country, among which 42 are Krishna Consciousness congregations.

== Paganism and native faith ==
=== Pagans ===
The Slavic native faith (Rodnovery, Ukrainian: Рідновірство Ridnovirstvo, Рідновір'я Ridnovirya or Рiдна Вiра Ridna Vira; otherwise called Православ'я Pravoslavya—"Orthodoxy") is represented in Ukraine by numerous organizations. As of 2016 there are 138 registered communities divided between the Church of the Native Ukrainian National Faith (Рідна Українська Національна Віра, RUNVira)—72 churches, the Ancestral Fire of Native Orthodoxy (Родового Вогнища Рідної Православної Віри)—21 churches, the Church of the Ukrainian Gentiles (Церкви Українських Язичників)—7 churches, the Federation of Ukrainian Rodnovers (Об'єднання Рідновірів України)—6 churches, and other organizations—32 churches.

Lev Sylenko founded the Church of the Native Ukrainian National Faith (RUNVira) in 1966 in Chicago, United States, and only opened their first temple in the mother country of Ukraine after the breakup of the Soviet Union in 1991. The current headquarters of RUNVira is in Spring Glen, New York, United States. The doctrine of the Church of the Native Ukrainian National Faith, "Sylenkoism" or "Dazhbogism", is monist and centered around the god Dazhbog.

As of 2018, there were 0.1% Pagan believers in Ukraine, with a higher percentage in Central Ukraine. Sociologists estimated between 1,000 and 95,000 Rodnovers (0.2%) in Ukraine in the early 2000s.

=== Native places of power ===
The most famous temple is located in Khortytsia in Zaporizhzhia. According to the beliefs of ancestors, the whole island is a sacred place that has a strong energy. There are still preserved idols and temples. Modern followers of the old faith often visit this place.

== Other religions ==
As of 2016, there were 241 officially registered churches belonging to various new religious movements (including the aforementioned Hindu groups, the Bahá'í Faith, Jehovah's Witnesses), 58 registered Buddhist groups, and various registered churches for national minorities – including two Chinese Taoist churches and one Korean Methodist church, four Jewish Karaite kenas, eight churches for Christian Jews, and 35 churches of Messianic Judaism.

== Ecumenism: All-Ukrainian Council of Churches and Religious Organizations ==
In December 1996, the All-Ukrainian Council of Churches and Religious Organizations was formed with the objective of uniting around 90–95% of religious communities of Ukraine. Since the end of 2003, the Council of Representatives of the Christian Churches of Ukraine exists in parallel to the council to promote the principles of Christianity in Ukraine and religious freedom. Affiliation with either or both of the assemblies is voluntary.

In 2007, the council accounted for representatives of 19 organizations, while in 2013, only 18. The Council of Christian Churches accounted for representatives from 9 churches.

== Religious freedom ==
Ukraine's laws guarantee the right of religious freedom, and provide a legal framework for the registration of religious groups. Some religious groups have reported difficulties in legally acquiring property (including property previously confiscated by the government of the Soviet Union) due to discriminatory treatment by local government bodies.

There are ongoing disputes of jurisdiction between the Ukrainian Orthodox Church – Kyiv Patriarchate and the Ukrainian Orthodox Church Moscow Patriarchate, which split as a consequence of the Russian military invasion of Ukrainian territory. Far-right Ukrainian nationalist groups such as Freedom have assaulted members of the Moscow Patriarchate and otherwise harassed them.

There have been several instances of violence against Jews in Ukraine since 2013.

Vandalism against religious buildings and monuments is common, with many different denominations affected. Jewish and Roman Catholic buildings were among the most targeted.

In territories not controlled by the government of Ukraine, Jehovah's Witnesses have faced persecution by Russian and separatist authorities. Russian media has also frequently denounced Jehovah's Witnesses and the Kyiv Patriarchate as being "pro-fascist".

On 2 December 2022, Ukrainian President Volodymyr Zelenskyy entered a bill to the Verkhovna Rada that would officially ban all activities of the Ukrainian Orthodox Church (Moscow Patriarchate) UOC in Ukraine.

In 2023, the country was scored 3 out of 4 for religious freedom by American non-profit Freedom House.

== Gallery ==
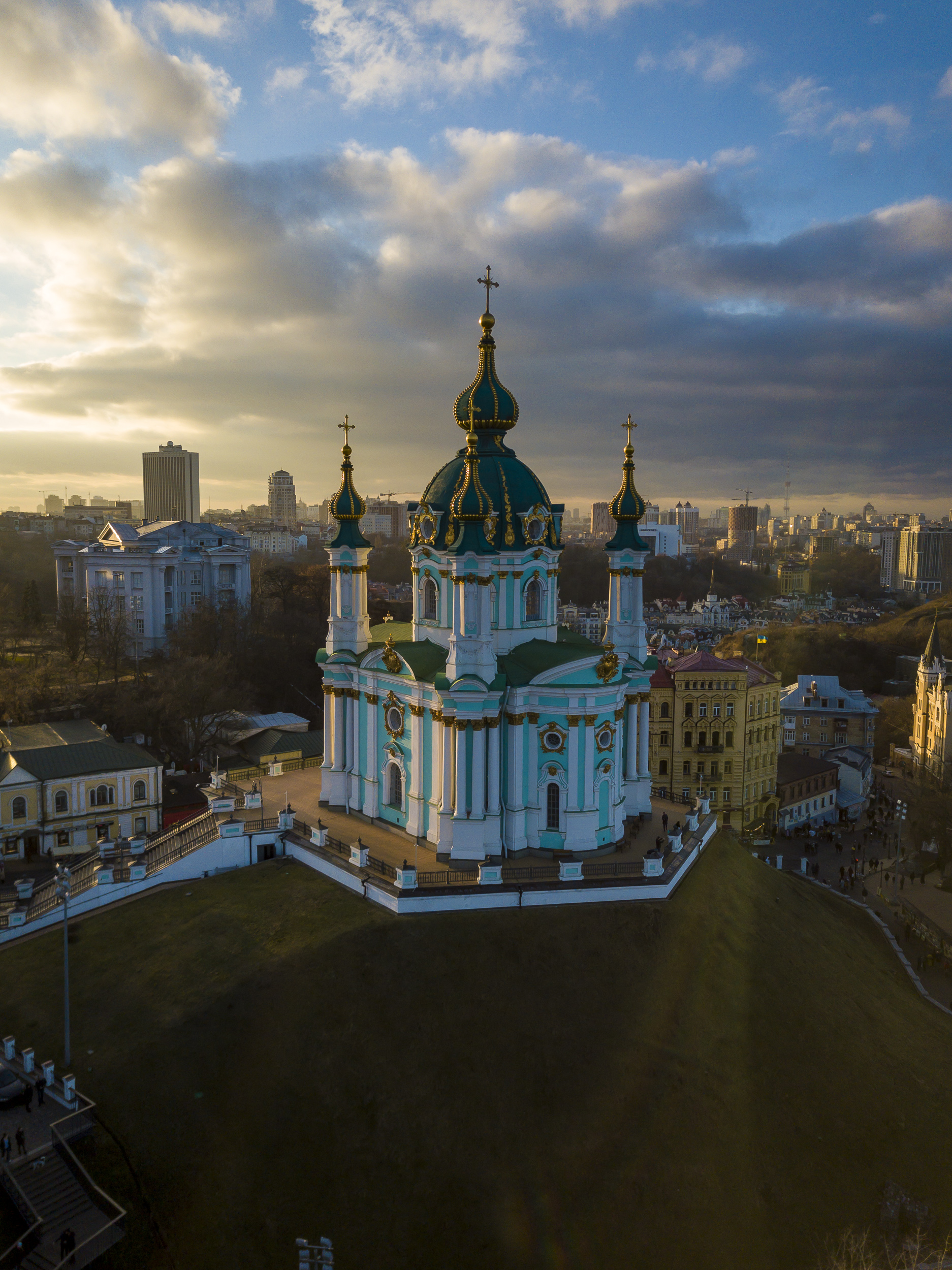
St Andrew's Church, Kyiv

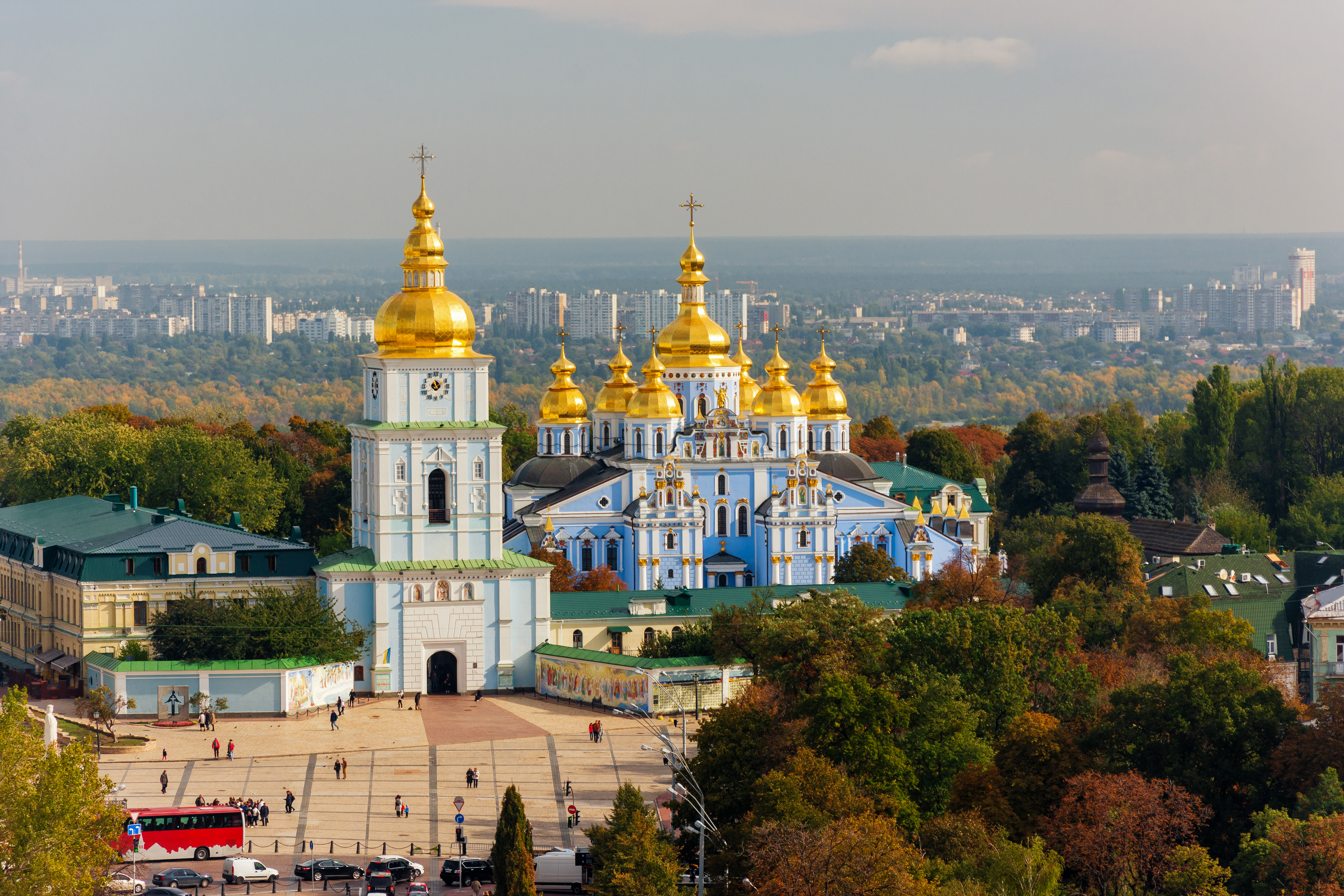
St. Michael's Golden-Domed Monastery

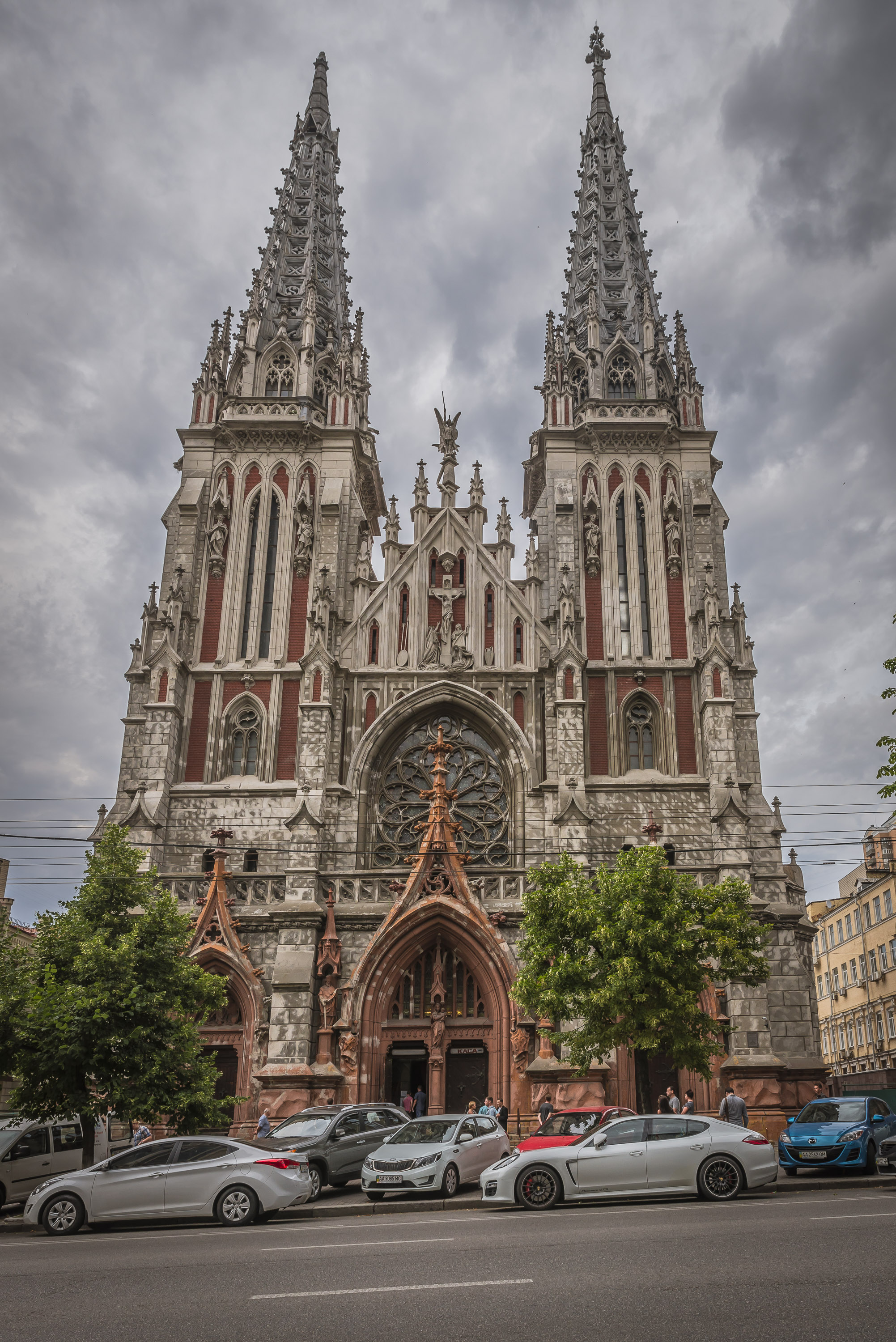
St. Nicholas Church, Kyiv

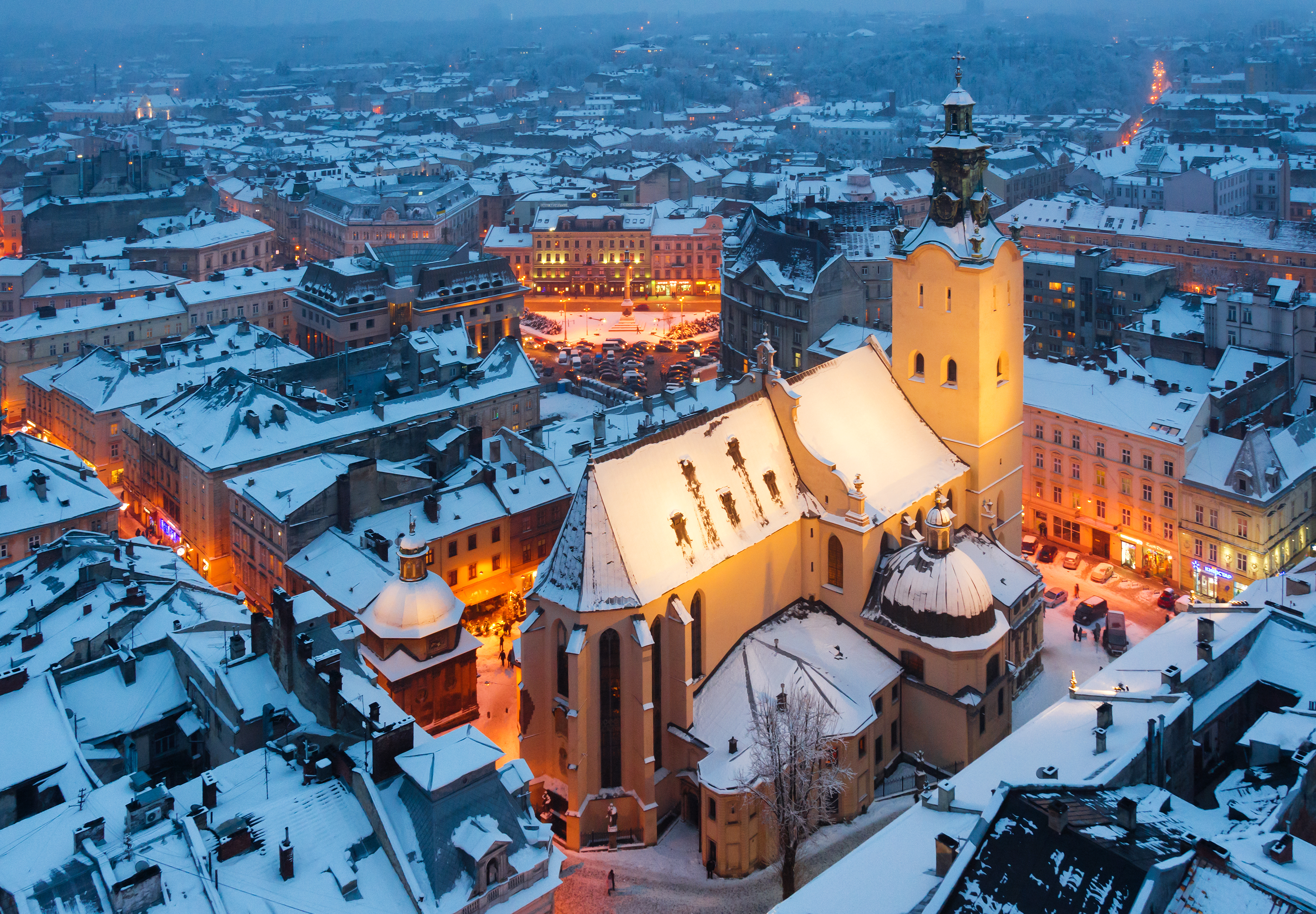
Cathedral Basilica of the Assumption, Lviv

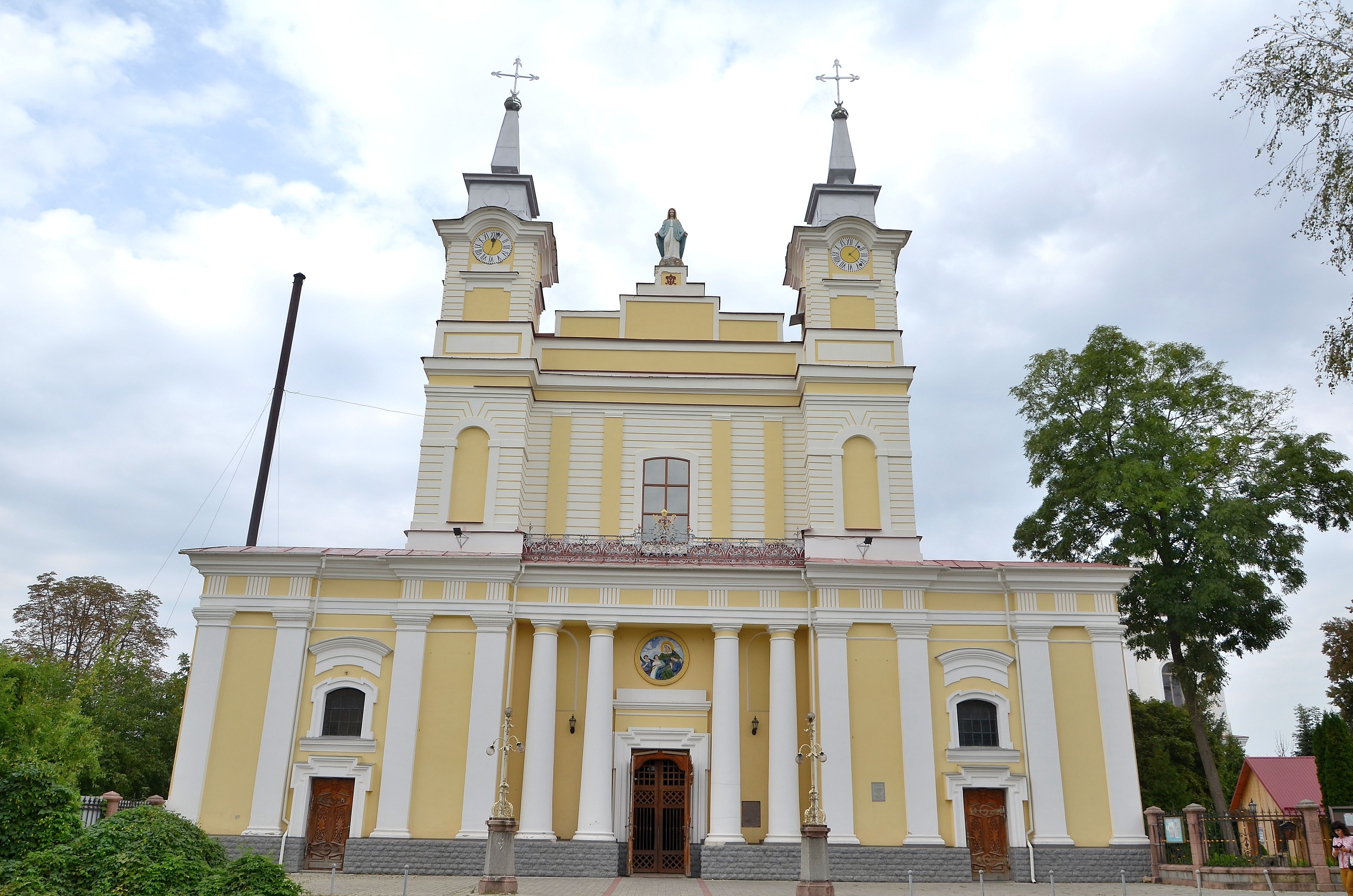
Saint Sophia Cathedral, Zhytomyr

Church of St. Nicholas, Kamianske

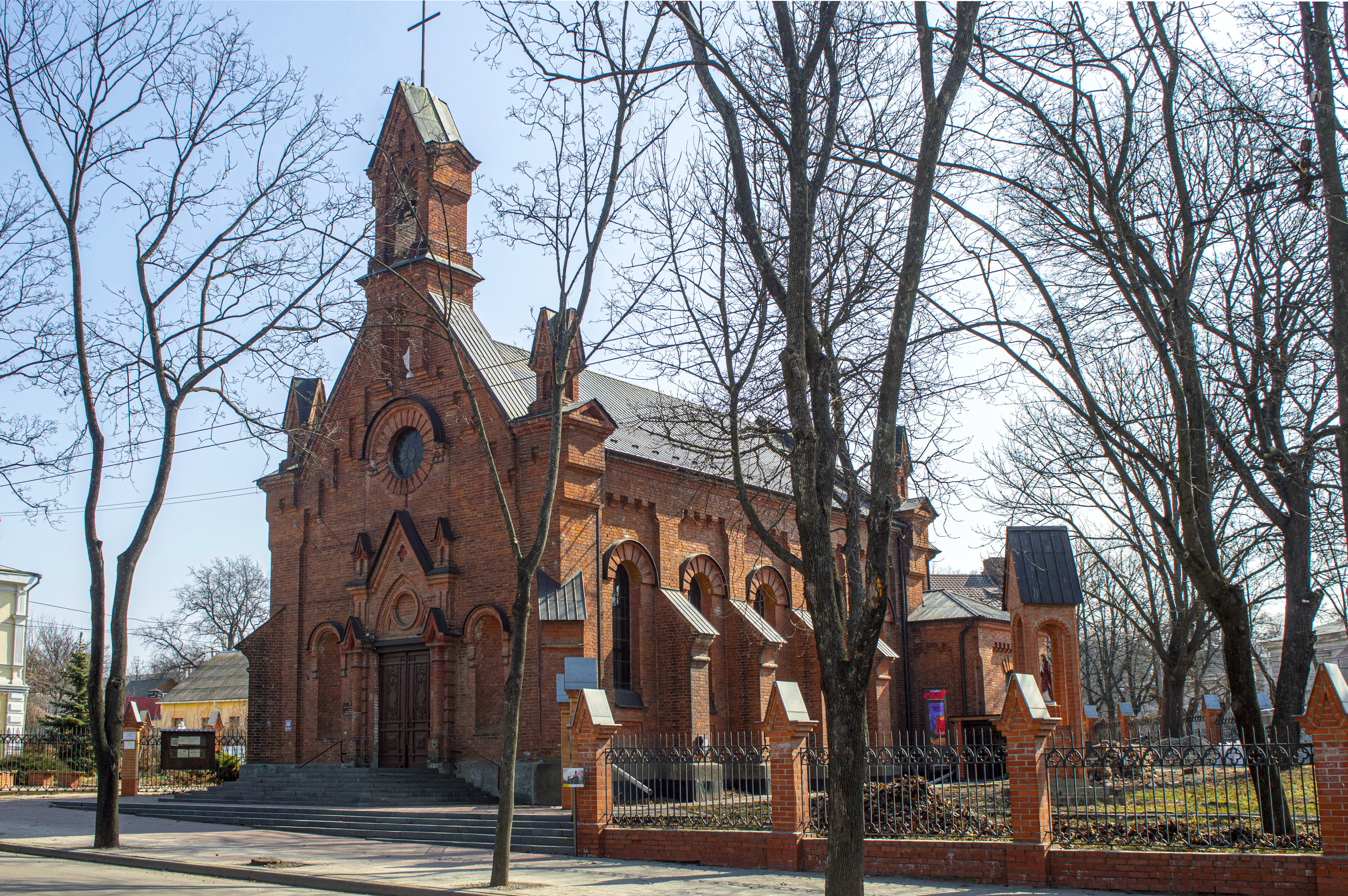
Church of the Annunciation of the Blessed Virgin Mary, Sumy

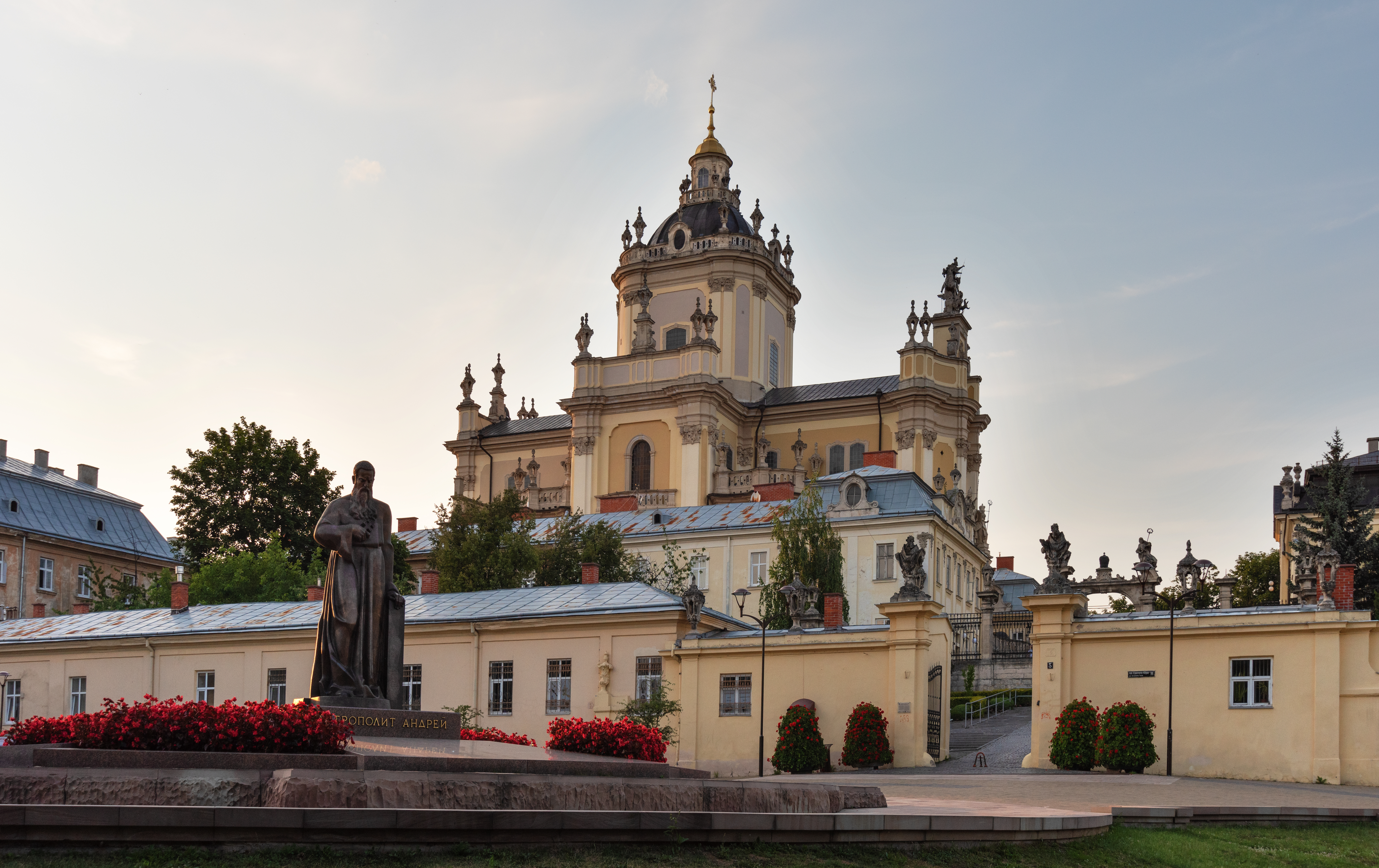
St. George's Cathedral, Lviv

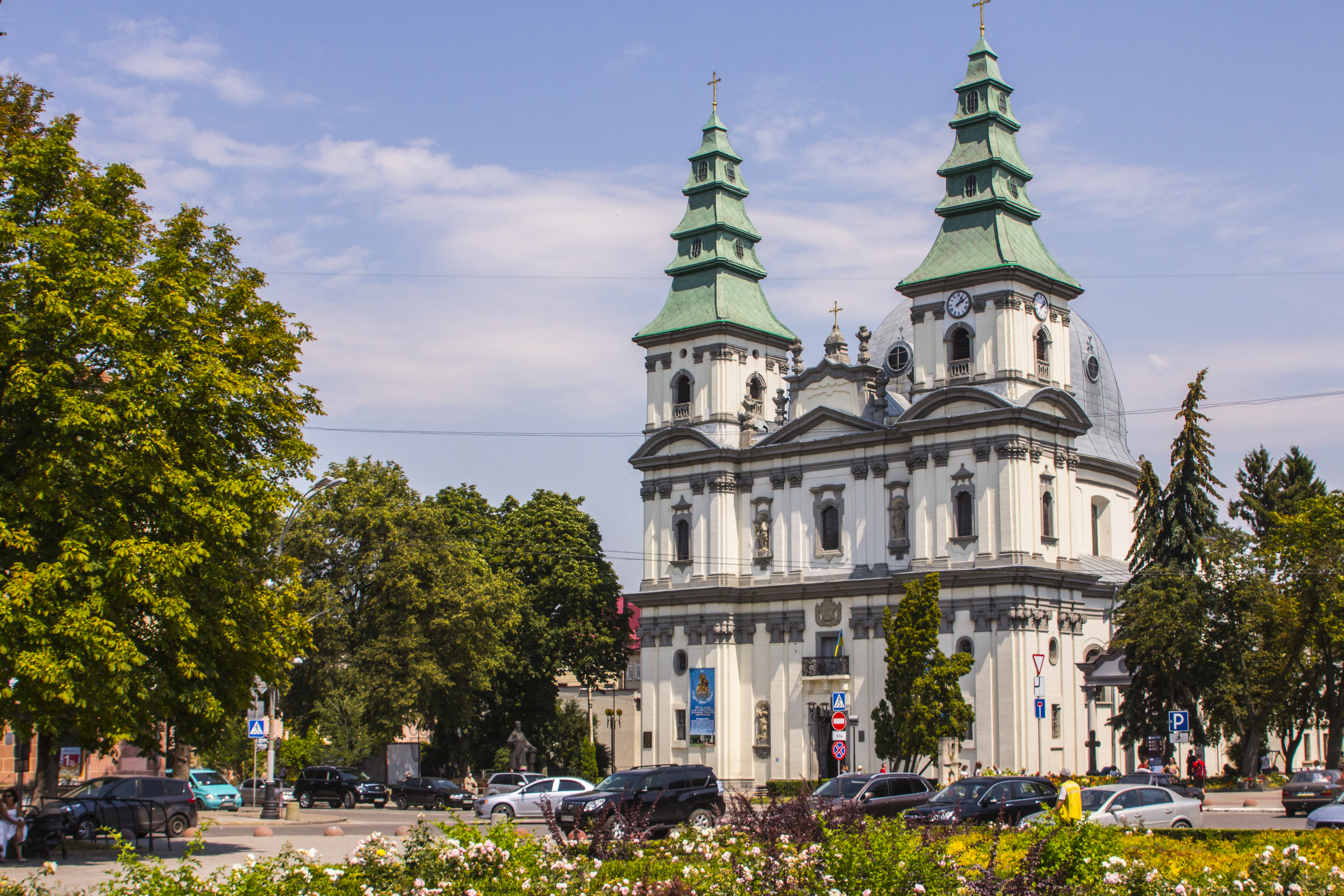
Cathedral of the Immaculate Conception of the Blessed Virgin Mary, Ternopil

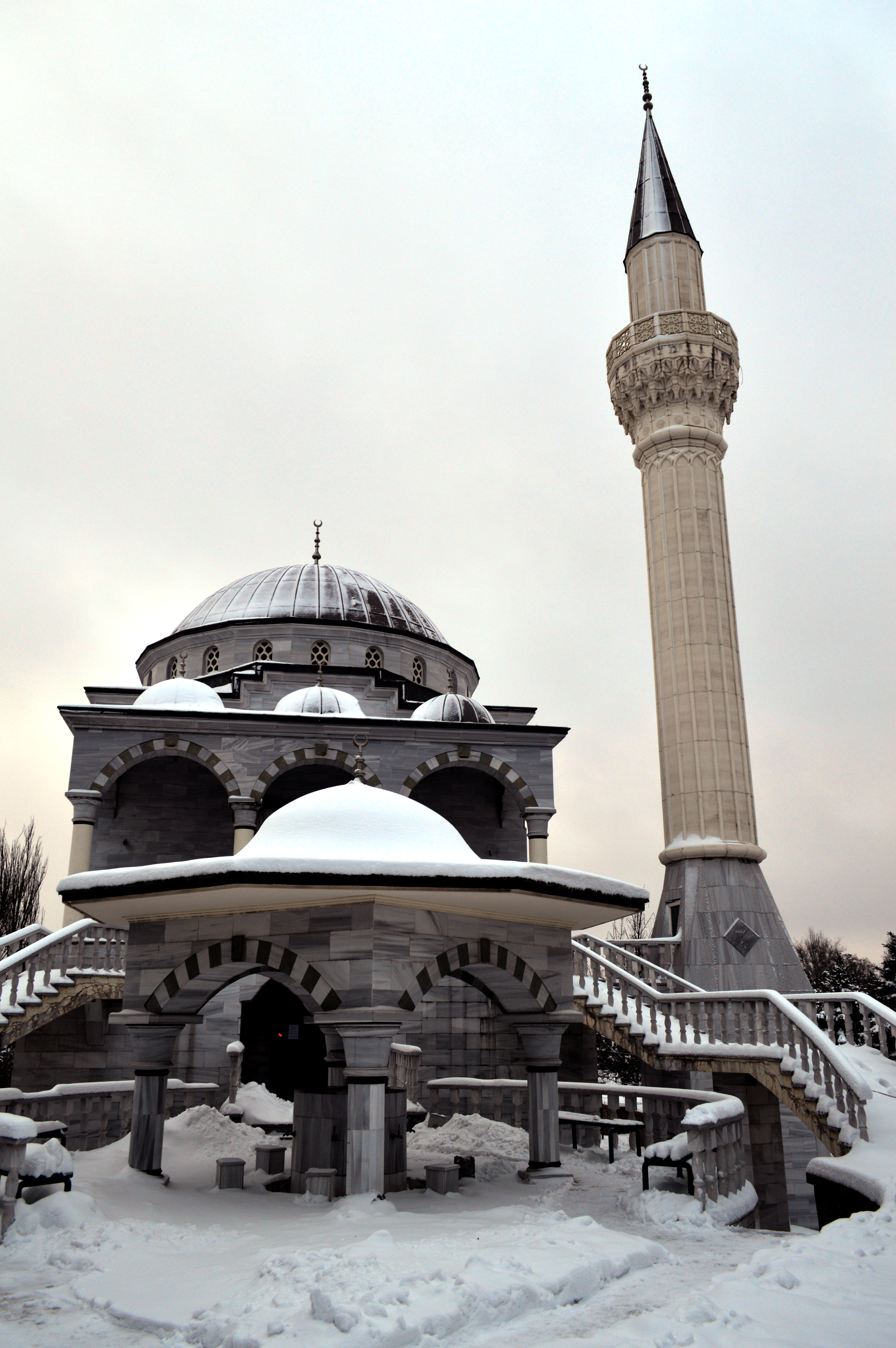
Sultan Suleiman Mosque, Mariupol

== See also ==
- History of Christianity in Ukraine
- History of the Jews in Ukraine
- Religion by country
- Catholic Church in Ukraine
- Protestantism in Ukraine
- Ukrainian Bible Society
- Islam in Ukraine
