= Razumkov Centre =

Ukrainian think tank

- Formation: 15 August 1994
- Type: Public policy think tank
- Headquarters: Kyiv, Ukraine
- Main organ: Razumkov Centre Board
- Budget: $987,000 (2007)
- Website: razumkov.org.ua

Razumkov Centre (Ukrainian: Центр Разумкова, romanized: Tsentr Razumkova), or fully the Ukrainian Centre for Economic and Political Studies named after Olexander Razumkov (Ukrainian: Український центр економічних і політичних досліджень імені Олександра Разумкова, romanized: Ukrainskyi tsentr ekonomichnykh i politychnykh doslidzhen imeni Oleksandra Razumkova), is a Ukrainian non-governmental public policy think tank.

== Overview ==
The Razumkov Center carries out research in domestic, economic, social and foreign policy, state administration, energy, land relations, international and regional security, and national security and defence.

At the International Economic Forum in Krynica-Zdrój, Poland in 2004, the Razumkov Centre received one of the awards in the category "Non-Governmental Organization of the year in Central and Eastern Europe 2004".

In 2009, The Washington Post newspaper referred to Razumkov Centre as "a top research institute."

According to the 2016 Global Go to Think Tank Index Report published by the Lauder Institute at the University of Pennsylvania, the Razumkov Centre was ranked as follows:

- 36 among the Top 150 Think Tanks Worldwide (non-US)
- 55 among the Top 175 Think Tanks Worldwide (including the US)
- 5th among the Top 90 Think Tanks in Central and Eastern Europe.

Until the year, 2000, the think tank was named Ukrainian Centre for Economic and Political Studies. Almost a year after the death of Olexander Razumkov, a former employee, its founders decided to attach his surname to the think tank's name.
