= Latin Church in Ukraine =

Church in Ukraine

- Latin: Ecclesia Latina in Ucraina
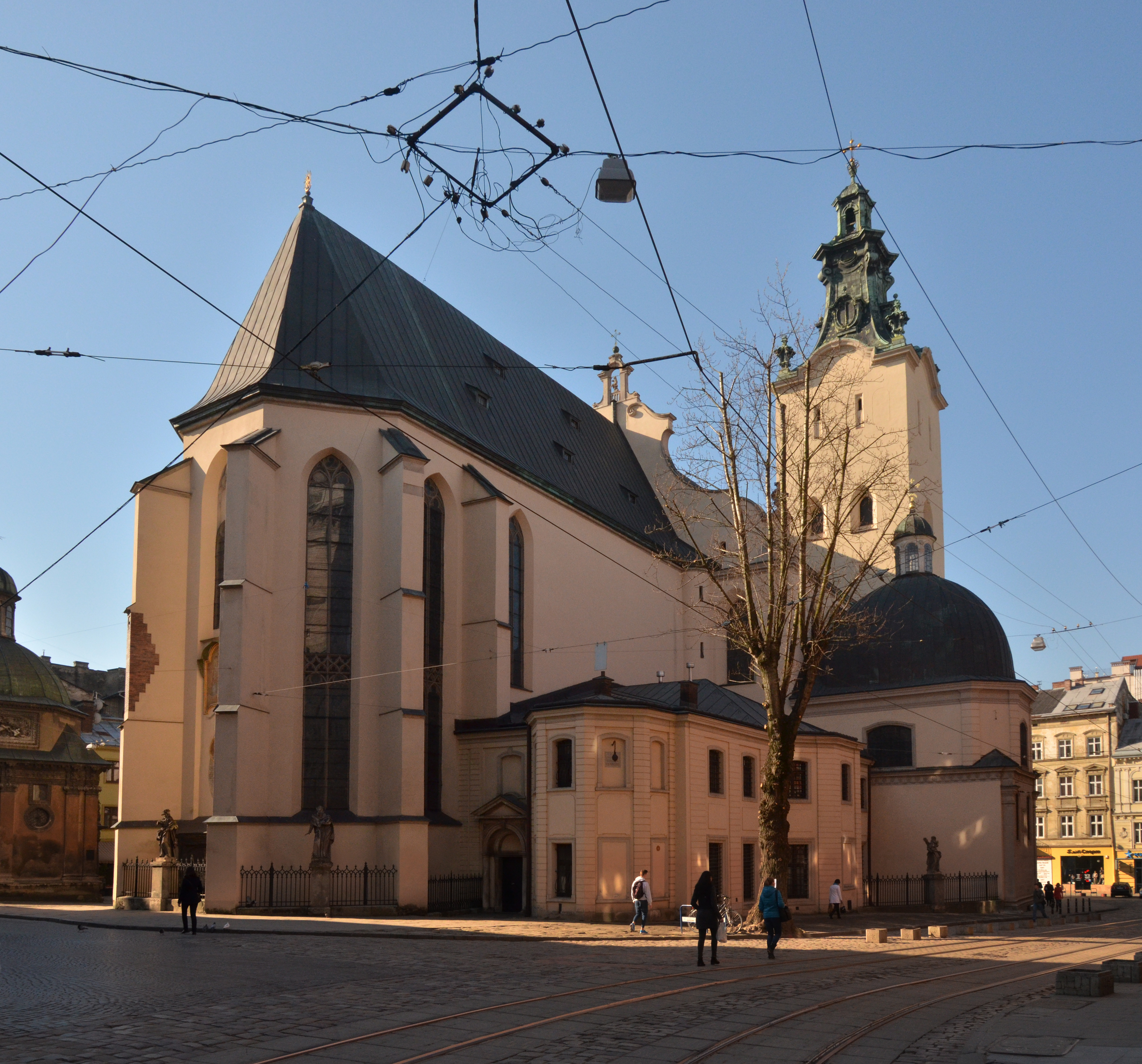
- Archcathedral Basilica of the Assumption of the Blessed Virgin Mary in Lviv
- Abbreviation: LCiU, RCCiU
- Classification: Catholic
- Orientation: Western Christianity
- Scripture: Vulgate
- Theology: Catholic theology
- Polity: Episcopal
- Governance: Holy See
- Pope: Leo XIV
- Archbishop-Metropolitan of Lviv: Mieczysław Mokrzycki
- Language: Ukrainian, Ecclesiastical Latin, Polish, Russian
- Liturgy: Latin liturgical rites
- Headquarters: Archcathedral Basilica of the Assumption of the Blessed Virgin Mary in Lviv, Ukraine
- Territory: Ukraine
- Founder: Apostles Peter and Paul, according to tradition
- Origin: 10th century Kyivan Rus
- Members: 1.2 % believers of Ukraine (2021)
- Ministers: 675
- Primary schools: 7
- Other name(s): Roman Catholic Church in Ukraine

Latin Church in Ukraine (LCiU) (Latin: Ecclesia Latina in Ucraina; Ukrainian: Латинська церква в Україні, romanized: Latynska tserkva v Ukraini), also officially Roman Catholic Church in Ukraine (RCCiU) (Latin: Ecclesia Catholica Romana in Ucraina; Ukrainian: Римсько-католицька церква в Україні, romanized: Rymsko-katolytska tserkva v Ukraini) is the Latin Church of the Catholic Church in Ukraine. The Latin Church is one of four sui iuris Catholic churches in Ukraine, the others being the Ukrainian Greek Catholic Church, the Ruthenian Greek Catholic Church, and the Armenian Catholic Church, all in full communion with each other and the Pope. The Latin Church presence performs its liturgies according to the Latin liturgical rites.

It has been present on Ukrainian lands since the 10th century, since the times of Kievan Rus'. During the Polish–Lithuanian Commonwealth in the 14th - 18th centuries she was one of the leaders of Western European culture and science in Ukraine. During the Russian Empire and in the Soviet era, it was persecuted and worked underground. After Ukraine gained independence in 1991, it resumed its official activities. As of 2021, there are 19 dioceses, 1134 parishes, 3 higher theological seminaries, 12 bishops and about 700 priests, half of whom are foreigners. The number of believers is about 1.5 million people. Since 2008 it has been headed by Lviv Archbishop-Metropolitan Mieczysław Mokrzycki. It is governed by a conference of bishops. Information Office - Catholic Media Center. The largest pilgrimage center is Berdychiv Carmelite Monastery. The main educational institution for the laity is the Thomas Aquinas Institute in Kyiv.

== History ==
The spread of Christianity in Ukraine is associated with the legend of St. Andrew the Apostle. The first historical Christian communities in the Ukrainian Crimea were founded at the end of the 1st century by Pope Clement I, who was in exile there. In the third and fourth centuries, there was a Gothic bishopric in the south of Ukraine, whose representatives took part in the First Council of Nicaea.

One of the first Christian princes in the Ukrainian lands is considered to be Prince Askold of Kiev, who was baptized in 867. On the grave of Askold was built the church of St. Nicholas, which may indicate that the Christian name of Askold was Nicholas. There is reason to believe that the prince received his name in honor of Pope Nicholas I, who pursued an active policy in the baptism of the Slavs and blessed the translations of the Bible made by Cyril and Methodius in the Slavic languages.

By the middle of the 10th century, during the reign of Prince Igor, the Christian community had grown and churches were being built. In 954–955, Slavic missionaries christened Igor's widow, Grand Princess Olga. She sent ambassadors to the German Emperor Otto I with a request to send bishops and presbyters to Rus. In 960 he was appointed Bishop of Rus Libutius of the Mogunt Monastery of St. Albania. He died in 961, and in the same year a German-Latin mission led by Bishop St. Adalbert of the Trier Monastery arrived in Kiev. Olga's grandson, Prince Yaropolk, sent ambassadors to Otto II in 974, and in 977 sent ambassadors to the Pope, and Pope Benedict VII sent his ambassadors to Yaropolk. This was the first embassy from Rome to Rus. A Latin diocese was founded in Kiev, headed by Bishop St. Boniface, which lasted until 979.

=== Baptism of Kievan Rus ===
In 988, Prince Vladimir baptized Rus. Although in Vladimir's time the Kiev metropolitanate was a subsidiary church of the Constantinople Patriarchate, the Church in Rus nevertheless became part of the Ecumenical Church. This is evidenced by the embassies from Rome, which brought the relics of Saints Clement and Titus to Korsun to Prince Vladimir in 988. After his baptism, in 991 - a new embassy from Pope John XV, in 1000 - the ambassadors of Pope Sylvester II brought relics Catholic Saints Vitus, Apollinarius, Benedict, and others. for churches that were built en masse in Rus.

Christianity strengthened the power of the prince, turned Rus into a powerful European state. In addition to ecclesiastical and political ties with the Holy See and the West, there were also dynastic ones, founded by Vladimir and inherited by his successors, including Yaroslav the Wise, whose four daughters married Christian kings of Norway, Hungary, France and Germany. From the tenth to the thirteenth century. Rus recognized the primacy of the Roman See, and the Russian episcopate, even after the so-called Great Schism of Patriarch Cerularius and the division of the churches in 1054, did not adopt any decree on separation from the Ecumenical Church.

By the end of the 10th century. Neighboring countries such as Poland (966), Bohemia, and Hungary also became Christian. In 1009, the Diocese of Transylvania was founded, one of the seven dioceses of the Catholic Church of Hungary, which contained the territory of modern Ukrainian Transcarpathia until the beginning of the 14th century. From 1346, when Transcarpathia became part of the Eger diocese - part of the Roman Catholic Church in Hungary, the construction of many Catholic churches began not only in cities but also in villages. In the 14th century. there were already more than 50 churches and several monasteries, in particular, the Templars were the first to establish their monastery in Berehove. Later - Dominicans and Franciscans. The Paulines settled in Kishbereg in 1329, and in 1363 - near Tiachiv.

=== The first dioceses in Kyiv ===
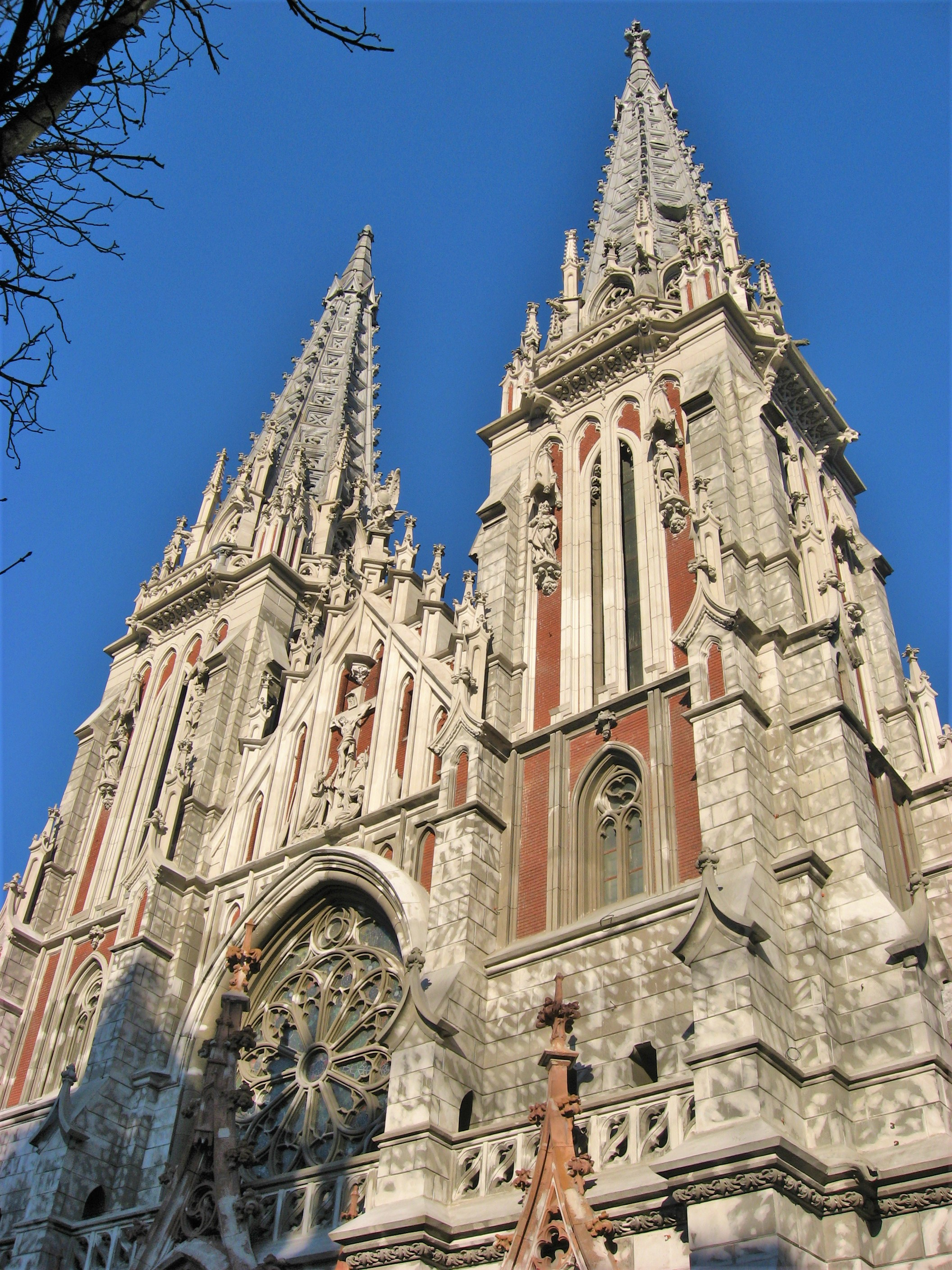
St. Nicholas Roman Catholic Cathedral, Kyiv

In Kyiv, Catholics were served by Irish Benedictines, who had their own monastery and church. From the twelfth century, active missionary work was also carried out by the Dominicans under the leadership of St. Jacek. This order included Bishops Gerard (? - 1241), Blessed Wit (? - 1269), Henry (1321–1350), James (? - 1377), Philip (? - 1387), Michael I Triska (? - 1426), Andrew of Cracow (? - 1434), Michael II (? - 1439), John (? - 1451), Michael III (? - 1487), Moses (1507–1519).

And although Latin bishops have been in Kyiv since the tenth century, the first episcopate in Kyiv appeared in 1321 under Bishop Henry. It covered the territory of modern Eastern and Southern Ukraine, including the Black Sea coast and part of modern Belarus and Russia (the territory of the Kyiv and Chernihiv principalities and the southern lands annexed in the Polovtsian wars). Bishops of Kyiv Libutiya, St. Alberta, St. Boniface, St. Until 1321, Bruno and their successors were called bishops of Rus, from 1638 - bishops of Kyiv and Chernihiv, from 1789 - bishops of Zhytomyr and Lutsk.

=== The first dioceses in Western Ukraine ===
The death of Prince Yaroslav the Wise and the gradual fragmentation of the Kyivan state affected the situation of the western Ukrainian lands. In 1199, Prince Roman Mstislavych of Volyn united Galicia and Volhynia into one state. He successfully fought with the Polovtsians and other enemies, annexed Kyiv to the Galicia-Volyn state. The claims of some historians that Roman was an opponent of Rome are not true. Many sources claim that Prince Roman was a Catholic (his mother, the Polish king's daughter, and his wife were Catholics).

In 1207, Pope Innocent III, through Cardinal Gregory, offered the Galician-Volyn state close contacts, trying to unite the peoples of Eastern Europe with Rome. In their letters, Pope Honorius III in 1227 and Pope Gregory IX in 1231 called on Ukrainian princes to switch to the Latin rite. In 1228 the Dominicans settled in Halych, and in 1235 the Franciscans came to Przemyśl and founded their monastery.

After the Tatar invasion, which began in 1239, the West united an anti-Tatar coalition, where it assigned a special role to Ukraine, and in particular to Prince Danylo Halytsky. In 1253, the papal legate Opizo of Mezano brought the crown from Innocent IV and Daniel was crowned king in Dorogichyn. The prince and the bishops took an oath, and the Pope guaranteed the inviolability of the Byzantine rite. Upon learning of this, the Tatars again threw hordes into Ukrainian lands, but Danylo repulsed their attack. But three years later, in 1256, at the request of the Tatars, Daniel severed ties with Rome, and the Pope transferred the Catholics who lived in Red Rus to the jurisdiction of the Bishop of Lublin, who had a vicar general in Volodymyr.

Ukrainian lands in the 14th-15th centuries. as a result of the decline of their own statehood, they become dependent on neighboring states. The Grand Duchy of Lithuania absorbed Volhynia and the central Ukrainian territories on both banks of the Dnieper. Having lost its dynasty, in 1349 Galicia came under the rule of the Kingdom of Poland. During the last decades of the 14th century. and during the 15th century. the northeastern lands came under the increasing control of the Moscow principality.

In 1359, the first Latin diocese was founded in Lviv, but the first Latin bishop of Lviv, Tom, did not reach Lviv. In 1367 there was already a Galician diocese, headed by Bishop Christine (died in 1370), who visited Lviv as the first of the Latin bishops.

Pope Gregory XI, with the bull "Debitum pastoralis offici" of 13 February 1375, finally founded the Latin metropolitanate and archdiocese with its seat in Galicia. Due to the greater distance from the Tatars in 1412, its settlement was moved from Halych to Lviv (bull "In eminenti specula" of 28 August 1412). The first metropolitan of the RCC in Halych was Archbishop Matthew of Eger (1375 - +1380) - a German who knew the Ukrainian language. After him, three other archbishops were Galician metropolitans: Bernard (1384–1390), c. Jakub Strzeme (Strepa) (1391–1409), beatified in 1790, and Mykolay Tromba (1410–1412).

Dioceses were established in Lutsk (1412), Kholm (1417), Volodymyr (1428) and Kamianets-Podilskyi (1440). At the beginning of the 15th century. the Latin metropolitanate in Ukraine was formed.

After the baptism of Rus during the 11th-12th centuries. The Kyiv Orthodox Metropolitanate gradually embraced all East Slavic lands, bringing them into the ecclesiastical orbit of Byzantium. But Kyivan Rus remained open to other influences. Geographical location led to contacts through trade, military action and diplomatic relations with the Eurasian steppe, the Baltic North, the Catholic West. In the Middle Ages, the Kyiv metropolitans and princes of Rus came into contact with the RCC. The metropolitans were present at the cathedrals of Lyons (1245) and Constanta (1418). Archbishop Peter Akerovich together with Pope Innocent IV conducted the Divine Liturgy in Lyon. Metropolitan of Kyiv Hryhoriy Tsamblak, not recognized as the Patriarch of Constantinople, took part in the cathedral in Constanta with a delegation of 300 people. The churches that preached the Gospel understood that their schism was contrary to the will of the Creator, so immediately after the schism in 1054 there were attempts to understand and resolve disputes between Eastern and Western Christianity. The Union of Florence in 1439 marked a temporary reconciliation, which was approved by the Pope and the Patriarch of Constantinople.

=== Florentine Union ===
In 1458 the ancient Russian metropolitanate was divided into Kyiv and Moscow. Pope Pius II proclaimed the Greek Gregory archbishop of Kyiv, Lviv and all of Little Rus. The boundaries of Gregory's jurisdiction included 6 dioceses in the Grand Duchy of Lithuania (Chernihiv, Smolensk, Polotsk, Turiv, Lutsk, Volodymyr) and 3 dioceses in the Kingdom of Poland (Peremyshl, Kholm, Galicia). The papal bull also testified that Rome had no illusions about the prospects of the Florentine union in Greater Rus under the schismatic rule of Jonah of Moscow. From 1458 to 1596 (Brest Cathedral) the lands of the Kyivan metropolitanate coincided with the borders of the dynastic United States - Poland and Lithuania. And although the Florentine union was a great achievement for the Byzantine and other Eastern patriarchs (it marked the union with the Roman Church), it was less successful for the Ukrainian Church. The main reasons for the failure were political pressure and the unfavorable church situation, in particular, the conquest of Constantinople by the Turks in 1453 and the autocephaly of the Moscow Church and the extension of its jurisdiction to Ukrainian territories.

=== Brest Union ===
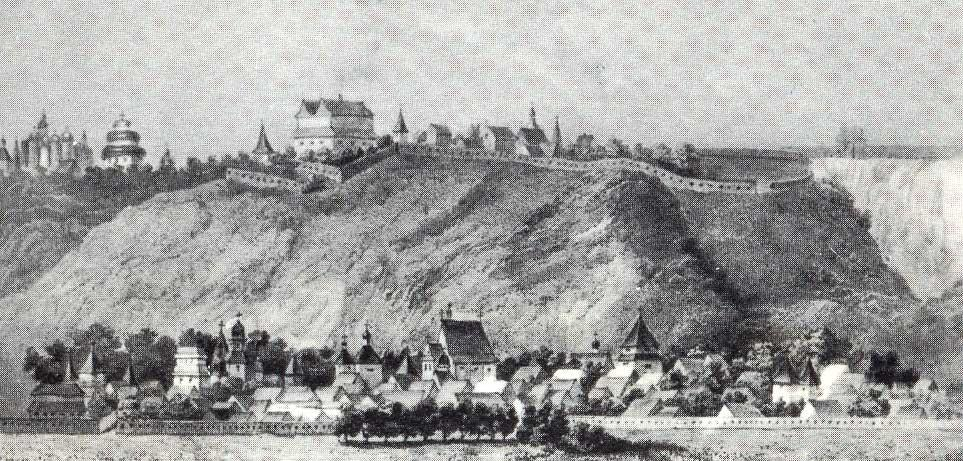
In Kyiv in the 17th century. there were two brick Catholic churches - Bernardine and Dominican. The latter existed in a rebuilt form even until the 20th century.

The aim of the Brest Union of 1596 was to unite the Kyivan Orthodox Church with the Roman See. On the Latin side, the idea of union was supported by the Jesuits Peter Skarga, Antonio Possevino, and the Apostolic Nuncio. Bull Clement VIII the Great Lord confirmed the administrative and ecclesiastical decision of Kyiv Metropolitan Mykhailo Rohoza on the union of the Roman Catholic Church and the Kyiv Orthodox Metropolitanate within the Polish-Lithuanian Commonwealth. The cathedral in Brest provoked opposition from some Orthodox Churches. In 1620, Patriarch Theophanes III of Jerusalem secretly ordained seven Orthodox bishops, headed by a metropolitan, for all dioceses already occupied by Greek Catholic bishops. By the Pereyaslav agreement of Hetman Bohdan Khmelnytsky with Moscow in 1654, Ukraine was given under the protectorate of Moscow. Partition of Poland in the 18th century. for the territories ceded to Russia, meant the demise of the union. For Greek Catholic bishops in Austrian territory in the 18th century. The Pope founded a special ecclesiastical province of Halych.

The idea of uniting the churches of the two rites gave an example of asceticism - the life and martyrdom of Polotsk Archbishop Josaphat Kuntsevich, killed in 1623 by fanatics in Vitebsk. In 1643, Urban VIII beatified the martyr Jehoshaphat, and Pius IX in 1867, the saint. His relics in 1916 were found in the Kholm region and brought to Vienna, where they remained until 1944 in the church of St. Barbarians, and then transported to Rome to the Cathedral of St. Petra.

== Organization ==
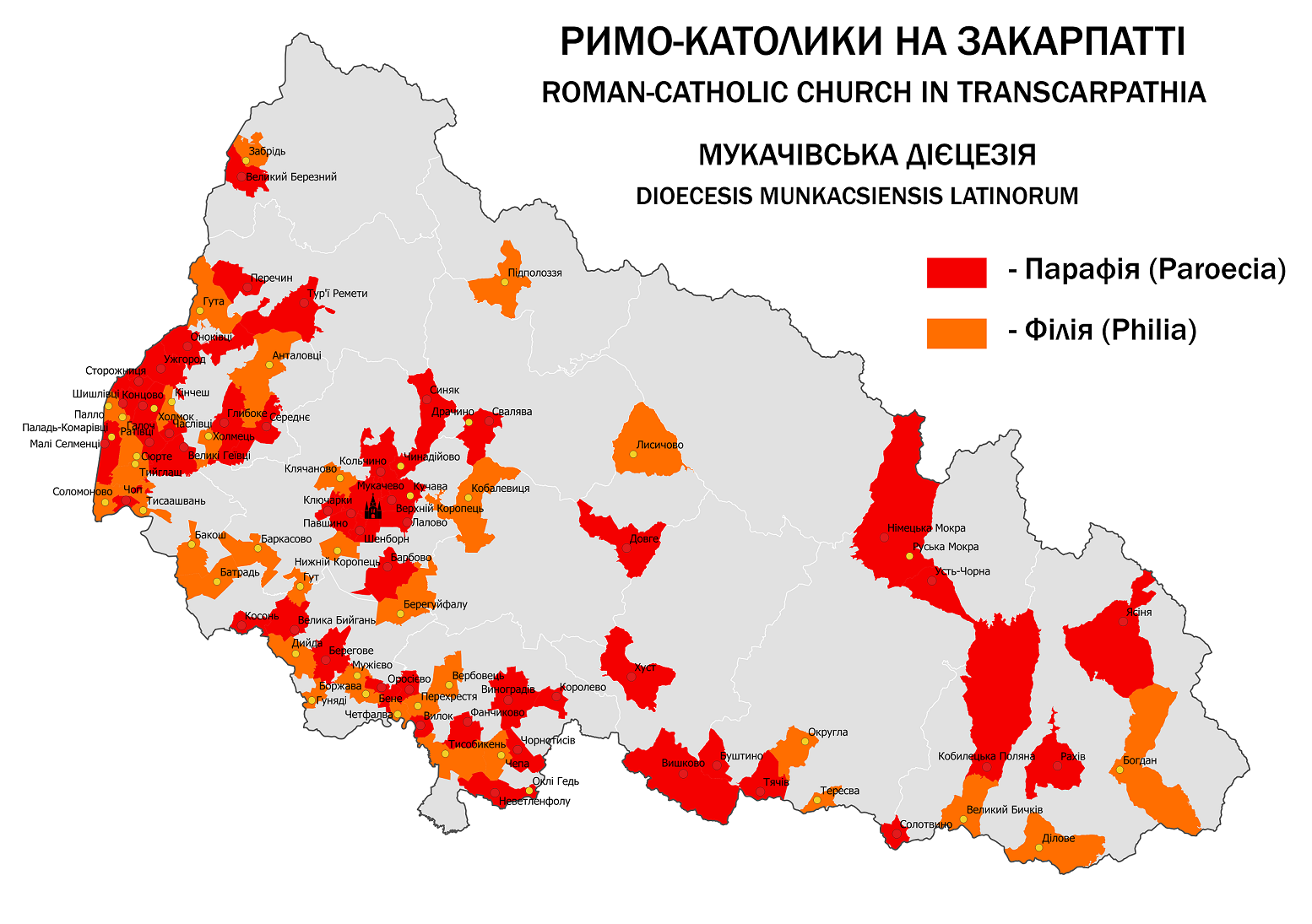
Roman Catholic parish in Transcarpathia region of Ukraine

Name	Oblast
Archdiocese of Lviv	Lviv, Ivano-Frankivsk, Ternopil and Chernivtsi
Diocese of Kyiv-Zhytomyr	Kyiv, Zhytomyr, Cherkasy and Cherhihiv
Diocese of Kamianets-Podilskyi	Khmelnytsk and Vinnytsia
Diocese of Lutsk	Rivne and Volyn
Diocese of Mukachevo	Zakarpattia
Diocese of Odesa-Simferopol	Odesa, Kherson, Kirovohrad, Mykolaiv and Crimea
Diocese of Kharkiv-Zaporizhzhia	Kharkiv, Zaporizhzhia, Dnipropetrovsk, Donetsk, Luhansk, Poltava and Sumy

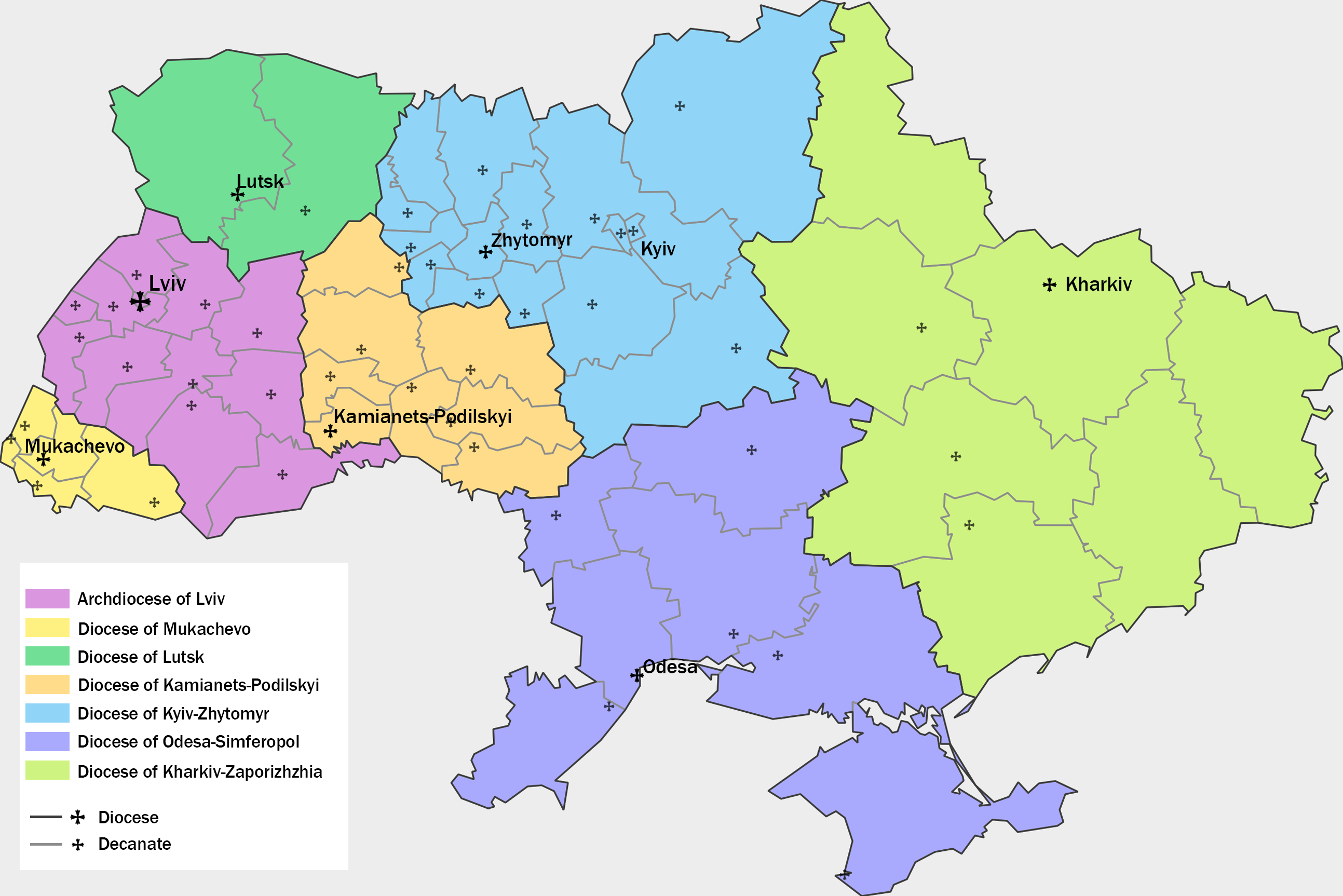
Roman Catholic Diocese and Decanates in Ukraine

== Statistics ==
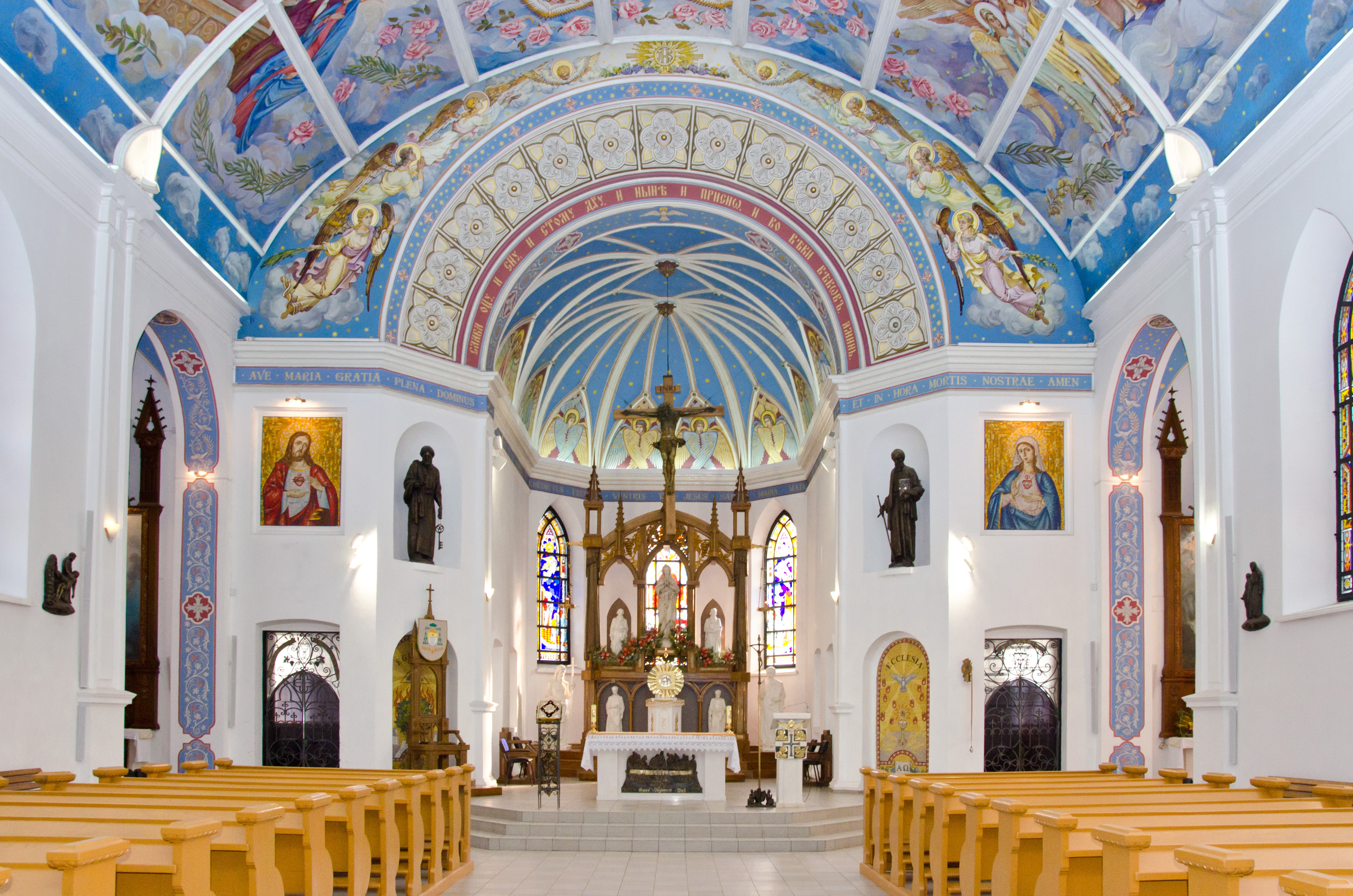
Cathedral of the Assumption of the Blessed Virgin Mary, Kharkiv

In recent years, the structure of the Roman Catholic Church in Ukraine (RCC) has become established. Thus, in 2009 the RCC had 907 organizations, in January 2013 its network consisted of 1110 structures (203 organizations or 18.2% growth over 4 years).

At the beginning of 2013, RCC religious organizations accounted for 22.1% of the country's Catholic branches or 3.0% of all religious organizations in the country. The vast majority of religious structures of the RCC operate in the west of the country, in particular in Lviv (163), Khmelnytsky (153), Zhytomyr (145), Vinnytsia (131), Zakarpattia (100), Ternopil (91), Ivano-Frankivsk (37) regions. Currently, the RCC consists of the Lviv Archdiocese and 6 dioceses, 18 monastic administrations, 925 communities (621 clergy, including 260 foreigners), 105 monasteries (648 monks), 41 missions, 5 fraternities, 9 theological schools (614 students), 521 Sunday school. The activities of the RCC are covered by 13 religious periodicals.

Date	Dioceses	Parishes	Monasteries	Monks and nuns	Missions	Brotherhoods	Teaching institutions	Listeners in them	Priests	Sunday schools	Periodicals
1.01.1997	4	712	24	229			5	216	333	232
1.01.1998		▲732	▲26	▼219	2	2	5	▼205	▲341	▲241
1.01.1999		▲751	▲33	▲252			▲6	▲372	▲401	▲309
1.01.2000		▲770	▲38	▲262			6	▲444	▲408	▲337
1.01.2001		▲798	▲50	▲309	▲22		6	▲483	▲431	▲405
1.01.2002		▲818	▲66	▲436	▲31		6	▲493	▲450	▲471
1.01.2003		▲840	▲73	▲564	31		▲7	▲1073	▲477	▲504	15
1.01.2004		▲854	▲80	▲635	▲37		7	▼782	▼474	▲518	▼13
1.01.2005	▲11	▲870	▲83	▼607	▲39	▲3	7	▼731	▲484	▲528	13
1.01.2006	11	▲872	83	▲615	39	3	7	▼687	▲499	▲553	13
1.01.2007	▲14	▲883	▲88	▲656	39	▼2	▲8	▼671	▲527	▼551	▲14
1.01.2008	▲18	▲895	▲91	▲667	39	▲3	8	▼634	▲541	▼517	14
1.01.2009	▲20	▲901	91	▲704	▲40	3	8	▼569	▲559	▲523	▼13
1.01.2010	▲21	▲904	▲96	▼695	▲41	3	8	▲581	▲566	▲524	13
1.01.2011	▲22	▲909	96	▼681	41	▲4	8	▲602	▲579	▼515	13
1.01.2012	22	▲913	▲100	▼663	41	4	8	▲619	▲608	▲518	13
1.01.2013	▲25	▲919	▲105	▼648	41	4	▲9	▼614	608	▲521	13
1.01.2014	▼24	▲942	▲108	▲652	▼40	▲6	9	▼411	▲612	▼483	▼9
1.01.2015	24	▼931	▲109	▼637	40	6	9	411	▼603	▼387	▲10
1.01.2016	▼18	▲933	▼106	637	40	6	▲10	▲431	▼580	▼362	▲18
1.01.2017	18	▲934	▲107	▲644	▲42	▼5	10	▼386	▲622	▲373	▲19
1.01.2018	18	▲937	▲109	▼641	▼41	▲6	10	▲382	▼608	▲397	▲20
1.01.2019	▲19	▲943	▲111	▲664	41	▼5	10	▼378	▲707	▲390	20

== See also ==
- Episcopal Conference of Ukraine
- Marian Yavorskyi
- Stanislav Shyrokoradiuk
- Superior Institute of Religious Sciences of St. Thomas Aquinas
