= Jan Sobilo =

- Titular Bishop of Bulna, Auxiliary Bishop of Roman Catholic Diocese of Kharkiv-Zaporizhia
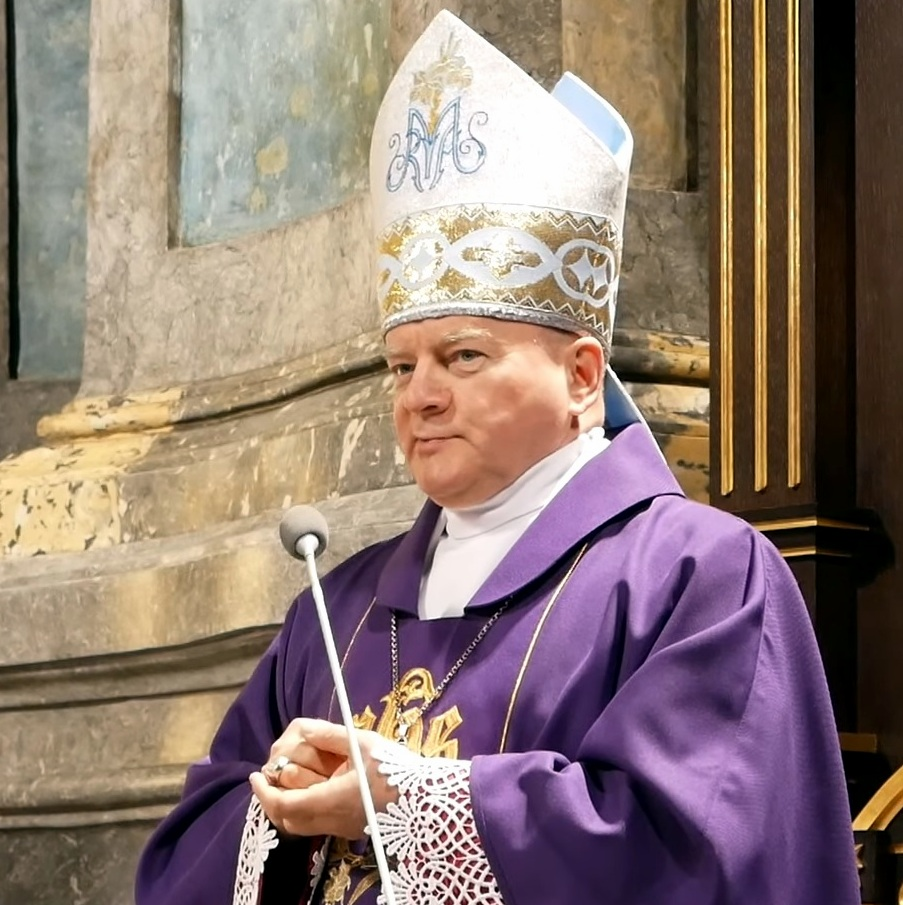
- Bishop Jan Sobiło during Mass on Ash Wednesday in the Archcathedral Basilica of the Assumption of the Blessed Virgin Mary in Lviv
- Church: Roman Catholic Church
- Appointed: 30 October 2010
- Successor: Incumbent
- Other posts: Vicar General of Roman Catholic Diocese of Kharkiv-Zaporizhia (since 2002) Order of Merit (3rd class)

Orders
- Ordination: 13 December 1986 (Priest) by Bolesław Pylak
- Consecration: 8 December 2010 (Bishop) by Marian Buczek

Personal details
- Born: Jan Władysław Sobiło; 31 May 1962 (age 64) Nisko, Polish People's Republic
- Coat of arms

Bishop Jan Sobilo (Ukrainian: Ян Собіло; Polish: Jan Władysław Sobiło; born 31 May 1962 in Nisko, Poland) is a Polish-born Ukrainian Roman Catholic prelate, who serves as an Auxiliary bishop of the Roman Catholic Diocese of Kharkiv-Zaporizhia and the Titular Bishop of Bulna since 30 October 2010.

== Life ==
Bishop Sobilo was born in the Roman-Catholic family in Nisko. After graduation of the school education in Zarzecze (1969–1977) and lyceum his native town (1977–1981), he subsequently joined the Major Theological Seminary in Lublin and the Catholic University of Lublin, and graduated them with a Master of Sacred Theology degree (1981–1986). He was ordained as priest on 13 December 1986, after completed his philosophical and theological study.

After his ordination he served as an assistant parish priest in Poland from 1986 until 1991, when he has been transferred to Ukraine. From 1991 to 1993 he was a parish priest in Manykivtsi, Roman Catholic Diocese of Kamyanets-Podilskyi and from 1993 Fr. Sobilo performed such ministry, as a parish priest in Zaporizhia and a Vicar General of Roman Catholic Diocese of Kharkiv-Zaporizhia (since 2002). Under his initiative and a supervision was constructed and consecrated in 2004 the Co-Cathedral of God Father Merciful.

On 30 October 2010 he was appointed by the Pope Benedict XVI as the Auxiliary Bishop of the Roman Catholic Diocese of Kharkiv-Zaporizhia and Titular Bishop of Bulna. On 8 December 2010 he was consecrated as bishop by Bishop Marian Buczek and other prelates of the Roman Catholic Church.

Catholic Church titles
Preceded by Jozef De Kesel	Titular Bishop of Bulna; 2010–	Succeeded by Incumbent
