= Sumi =

Sumi may refer to:

== People ==
Names

- Sumi Haru (1939–2014), American actress
- Sumi Hakim (born 1944), Indonesian fashion designer and former model
- Sumi Helal, Egyptian computer scientist
- Sumi Hwang (born 1986), South Korean soprano
- Sumi Jo (born 1962), South Korean lyric coloratura soprano
- Sumi Khadka (born 1978), Nepalese actress and beauty queen
- Sumi Shimamoto (島本 須美; born 1954), Japanese actress
- Sumi Tonooka (born 1956), American jazz pianist and composer

Surnames

- Azusa Sumi (鷲見 梓沙; born 1996), Japanese long-distance runner
- Eiji Sumi (隅 英二; born 1970), Japanese artist
- Hansjörg Sumi (born 1959), Swiss former ski jumper
- Koshiro Sumi (角 昂志郎; born 2002), Japanese footballer
- Peter Šumi (1895–1981) Yugoslav gymnast
- Reina Sumi (鷲見 玲奈; born 1990), Japanese freelance announcer
- Sharmin Sultana Sumi, Bangladeshi singer-songwriter
- Shreyaa Sumi (born 1987), Indian-American model

=== Fictional characters ===
- Sumi Sakurasawa, a character in the manga and anime series Rent-A-Girlfriend

== Places ==
- Bani Sumi', a sub-district in Taiz Governorate, Yemen
- Sumi Furasawa Site, an archaeological site, in Kanto, Japan

== Cultures ==
- Sümi Naga, one of the major Naga ethnic groups in Nagaland, India
- Sümi language, a Sino-Tibetan language spoken in India

== Cinema ==
- Sumi (film), a 2022 Indian film

== Sport ==
- Sumi, of Miga, Quatchi, Sumi and Mukmuk, the mascots of the 2010 Winter Olympics and Paralympics
- Sumi gaeshi, one of the 40 original throws in judo
- Sumi otoshi, one of the original 40 throws in judo

== Other uses ==
- Inkstick or Sumi ink, Japanese solid ink
- Ink wash painting or Sumi-e, Japanese ink wash painting
- Software Usability Measurement Inventory (SUMI), a questionnaire for assessing quality of use of software by end users
- Sumi, an honorific for Buddhist monks

== See also ==
- Sumii
- Sumitani
- Sume (disambiguation)
- Sumie (disambiguation)
- Sumy (disambiguation)
