= Sumy (disambiguation) =

Sumy is a city in the eponymous raion and oblast in Ukraine.

Sumy may also refer to:

== Places ==
- Sumy Raion, Sumy Oblast, Ukraine
- Sumy Oblast, Ukraine
- Roman Catholic Deanery of Sumy, Sumy Oblast, Ukraine

=== Facilities and structures ===
- Sumy Airport, Sumy, Ukraine
- Sumy railway station, Sumy, Ukraine
- Sumy State University, Sumy, Ukraine

== People ==
- Sumy (footballer) (born 1991), Malian soccer player
- Sumy Sadurni (1989–2022), Spanish-Mexican photojournalist and photographer

== Other uses ==
- Battle of Sumy (2022), during the Russian invasion of Ukraine
- Ukrainian corvette Sumy, an anti-submarine corvette first of the Soviet, then Ukrainian Navy
- PFC Sumy, Sumy, Ukraine; a soccer team
- FC Sumy, Sumy, Ukraine; a soccer team

== See also ==
- Sumy National Agrarian University, Sumy, Ukraine
- Sume (disambiguation)
- Sumie (disambiguation)
- Sumi (disambiguation)
