= Co-Cathedral of the Merciful Father, Zaporizhzhia =

Coordinates: 47.8450°N 35.1381°E

Co-Cathedral of the Merciful Father
- Прокафедральний собор Бога Отця Милосердного
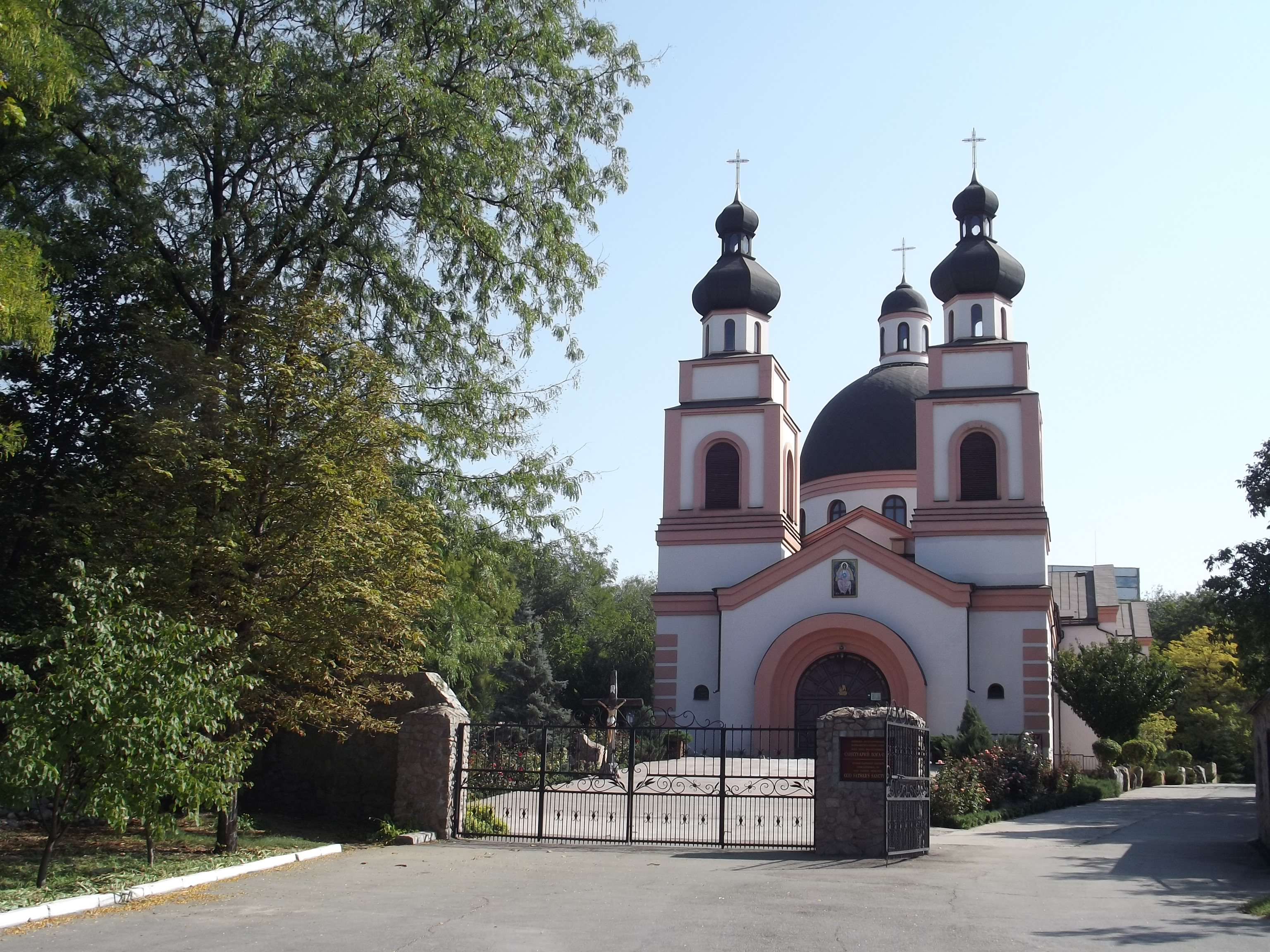
- Co-Cathedral of the Merciful Father
- Location: Zaporizhzhia
- Country: Ukraine
- Denomination: Roman Catholic Church

History
- Consecrated: 2004

Administration
- Diocese: Roman Catholic Diocese of Kharkiv-Zaporizhzhia

Clergy
- Dean: Bishop Jan Sobilo

The Co-Cathedral of the Merciful Father (Ukrainian: Прокафедральний собор Бога Отця Милосердного), also called the Co-Cathedral of Zaporizhzhia, is a religious building that is affiliated with the Catholic Church and is located in the city of Zaporizhzhia in the European country of Ukraine.

The cathedral follows the Roman or Latin rite and serves as the co-cathedral of the Roman Catholic Diocese of Kharkiv-Zaporizhzhia (Dioecesis Kharkiviensis-Zaporizhiensis, Харківсько-Запорізька дієцезія) which was created in 2002 by bull "Ad plenius prospiciendum" of Pope John Paul II. Its history dates back to April 5, 1998, when he was blessed plot of land for future building by Bishop Stanislaw Padewski. On October 7, 1999 the first stone in the presence of Bishop Leon Dubrawski, sent from Rome is placed. The church was designed by architects of Ukraine, partly following the model of the Basilica of St. Peter's in Rome.

On August 7, 2004, the cathedral was consecrated by the bishops Stanisław Padewski, Leon Dubrawski, among others

== See also ==
- Roman Catholicism in Ukraine
- Co-Cathedral
- List of cathedrals in Ukraine

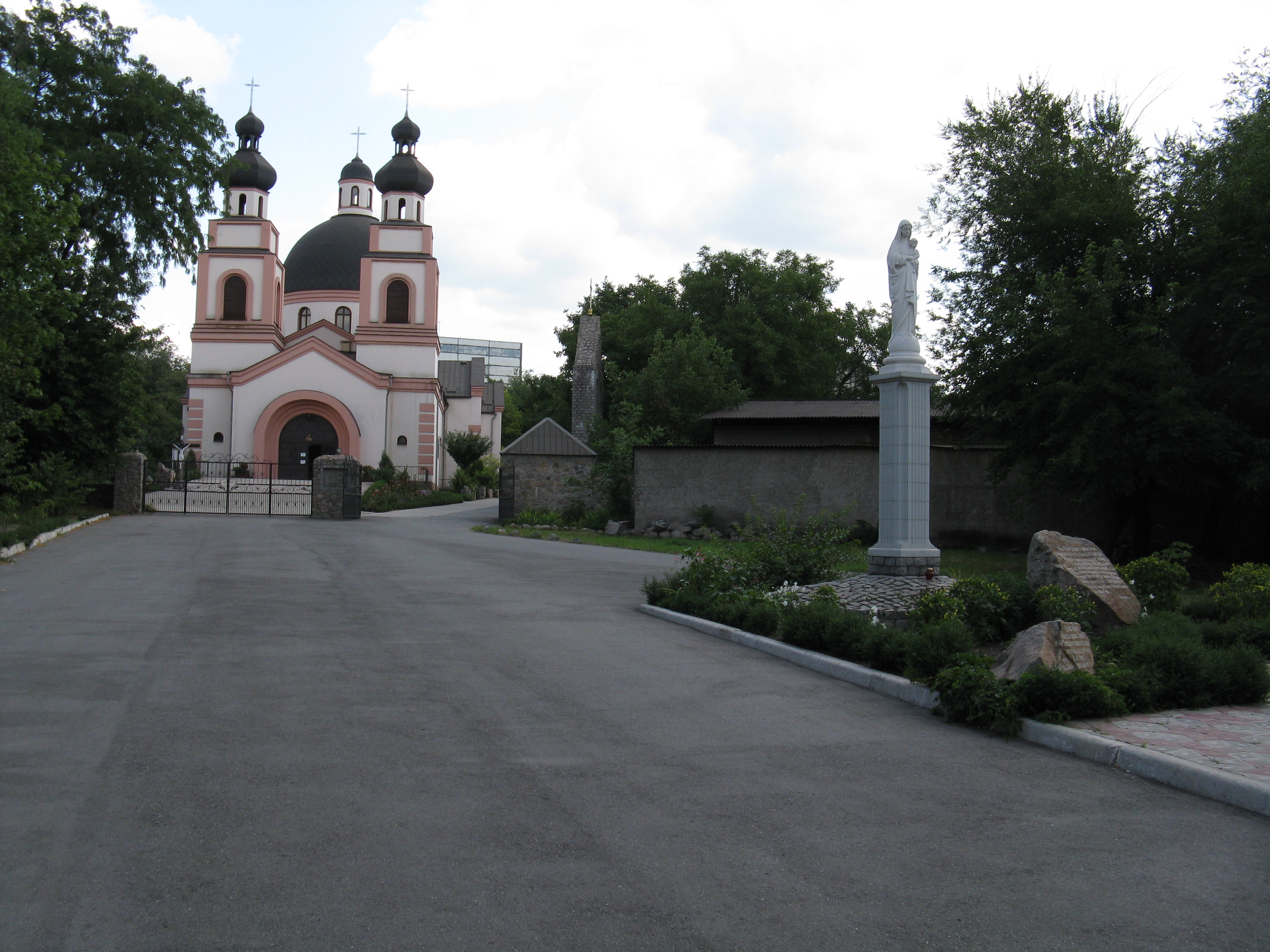
Another view
