= Cieszanów =

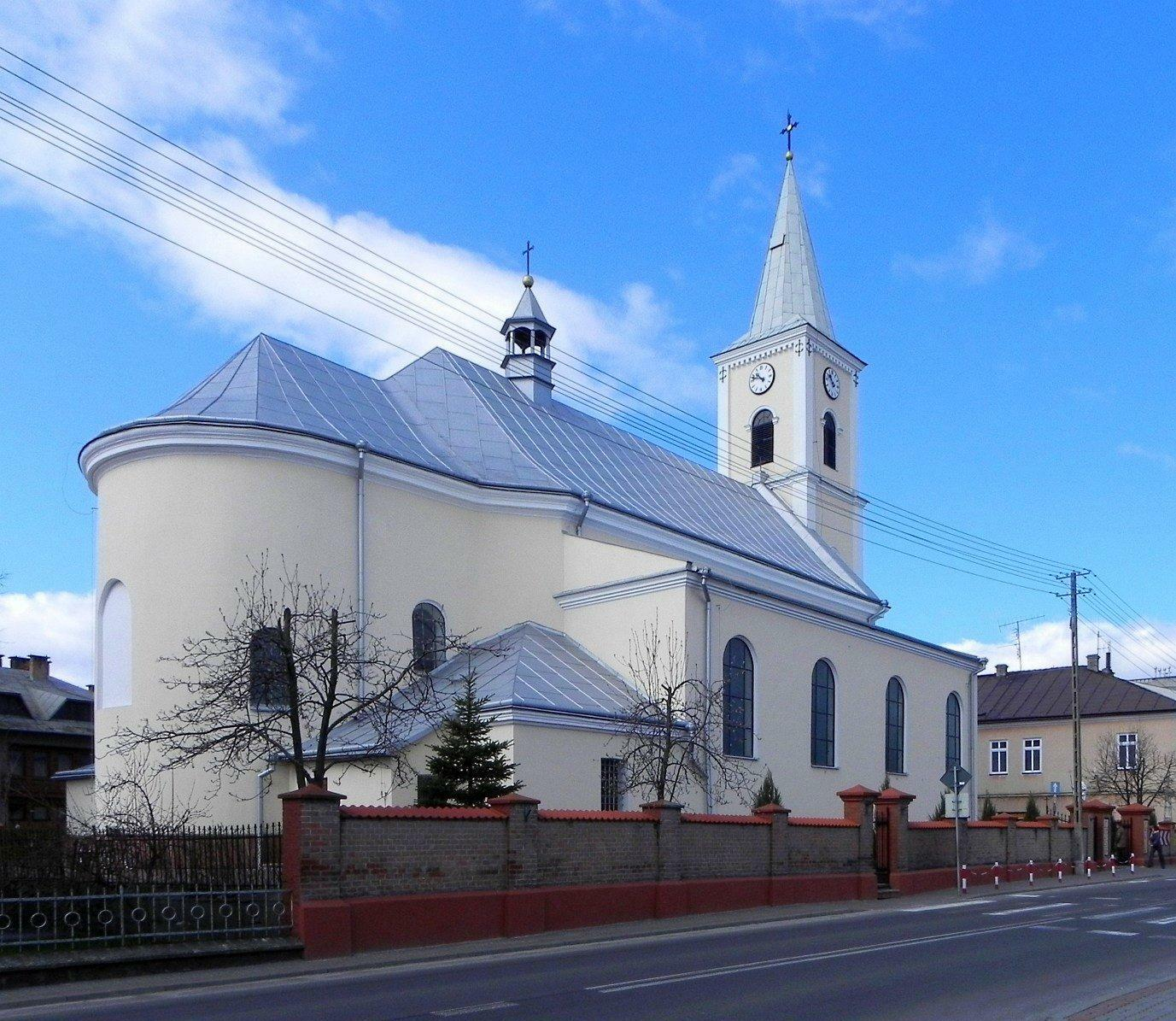
- St. Adalbert's Church

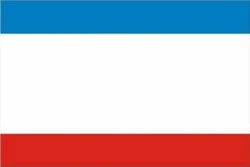
- Flag Coat of arms

- Location within Poland
- Coordinates: 50°16′N 23°8′E
- Country: Poland
- Voivodeship: Subcarpathian
- County: Lubaczów
- Gmina: Cieszanów
- Town rights: 1590

Government
  - Mayor: Zdzisław Zadworny

Area
  - Total: 15.09 km^{2} (5.83 sq mi)

Population (31 December 2021)
  - Total: 1,906
  - Density: 126.3/km^{2} (327.1/sq mi)
- Time zone: UTC+1 (CET)
  - Summer (DST): UTC+2 (CEST)
- Postal code: 37-611
- Area code: +48 16
- Car plates: RLU
- Website: http://www.cieszanow.org

Cieszanów (pronounced [t͡ɕɛˈʂanuf] (Note: Ukrainian: Тішанів or Цішанів or Чесанів, Tishaniv or Tsishaniv or Chesaniv; Yiddish: ציעשאנאָוו Tsyeshanov) is a town in Lubaczów County, Subcarpathian Voivodeship, Poland. As of December 2021, it has a population of 1,906.

Cieszanów is located on the boundary of southern Roztocze, in the valley of the Brusienka river.

== History ==
In the Middle Ages, sandy shores of the Brusienka river attracted Slavic Lechitic settlers, who probably in the 10th century established a gord here.

The history of a town named Cieszanów is rather short and dates back to the late 15th century, as it was first mentioned in documents in 1496. At that time, it was part of Lubaczów County, Bełz Voivodeship, Lesser Poland Province of the Kingdom of Poland. In 1580, the city of Zamość was founded, which attracted an influx of settlers. Furthermore, a merchant road to Jarosław was established nearby, so a nobleman Stanisław Cieszanowski (Jelita coat of arms), who was owner of the village, applied for town charter. On May 14, 1590 in Warsaw, King Sigismund III of Poland granted Magdeburg rights to the new town, which was named Cieszanów, after the Cieszanowski family.

Following the death of Stanisław Cieszanowski, the town belonged to several families. In 1648, its castle was attacked by Cossacks, during the Khmelnytsky uprising. In 1656, the town was burned by Swedes (see Swedish invasion of Poland), and in 1672 by Crimean Tatars. In 1681, King John III Sobieski, who had fought the Tatars in this area in the Polish–Ottoman War (1672–76), confirmed Cieszanów's town charter.

From the First Partition of Poland in 1772 until 1918, the town was part of the Austrian monarchy (Austria side after the compromise of 1867), head of the district with the same name, one of the 78 Bezirkshauptmannschaften in Austrian Galicia province (Crown land).

A brickyard was opened here, and in 1800, a brick church was built. The town remained private property of the Rojowski family, whose coat of arms is now used as the coat of arms of Cieszanów. In 1857, the population consisted of 859 Roman Catholics, 250 Greek Catholics and 1057 Jews. Since poverty was rampant, a number of residents decided to leave Galicia and settle in Northern America. In 1867 Cieszanów was named seat of a newly created county, which included six towns (Lubaczów, Cieszanów, Lipsko, Narol, Oleszyce and Płazów. County court, post and tax offices, and offices of the local governments were moved here from other towns.

Due to proximity of the border with Russian-controlled Congress Poland, Cieszanów and its vicinity was used for smuggling of weapons, ammunition and volunteers during the January Uprising (1863–1864). In May 1863, a large military hospital for Polish rebels was established here, and Austrian government, uneasy about the situation, sent to Cieszanów a squadron of Hungarian mounted troops, which guarded the borderline.

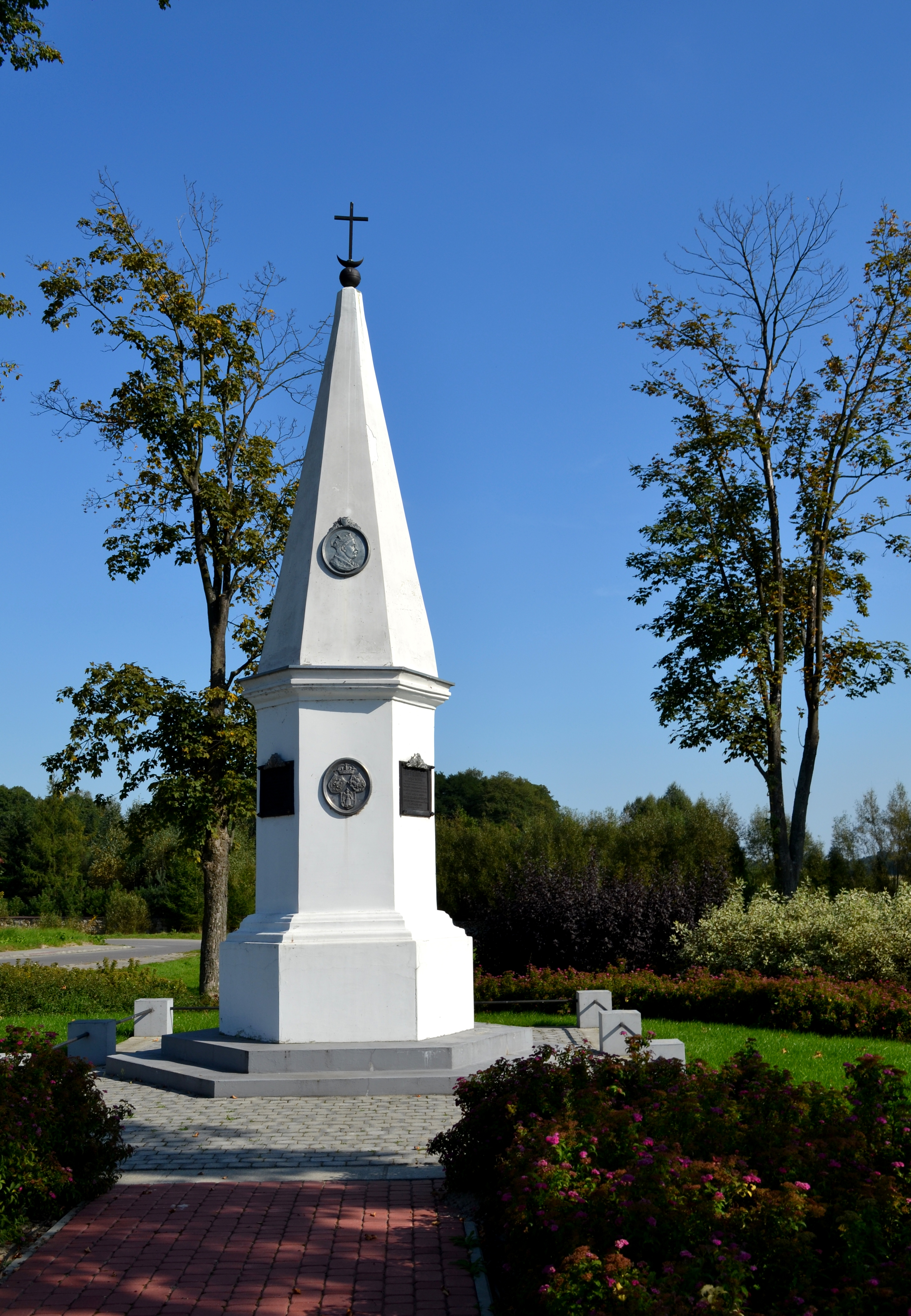
Monument to King John III Sobieski from 1883

In 1883, the monument of King John III Sobieski was unveiled, in 1871, a post of the Polish Pedagogical Society was established, followed by Volunteer Firefighters, Charity Society, Gymnastic Society Sokol, Polish Boyscouts, and other organizations. The development of Cieszanow was stopped by World War I. On November 11, 1914, the town was captured by the Russians, who remained here until June 18, 1915. During heavy fighting, the town was burned, and county government was temporarily moved to Lubaczów (until 1919).

On November 1, 1918, Ukrainian military units seized control over Cieszanów, but they were expelled by Polish soldiers on December 6, 1918. In the Second Polish Republic, Cieszanów belonged to Lwów Voivodeship, losing in 1923 its status as the seat of a county. Cieszanów was rebuilt, becoming local center of trade and commerce. In 1921, its population was 2282. In 1921 there were 929 Jews in Cieszanów.

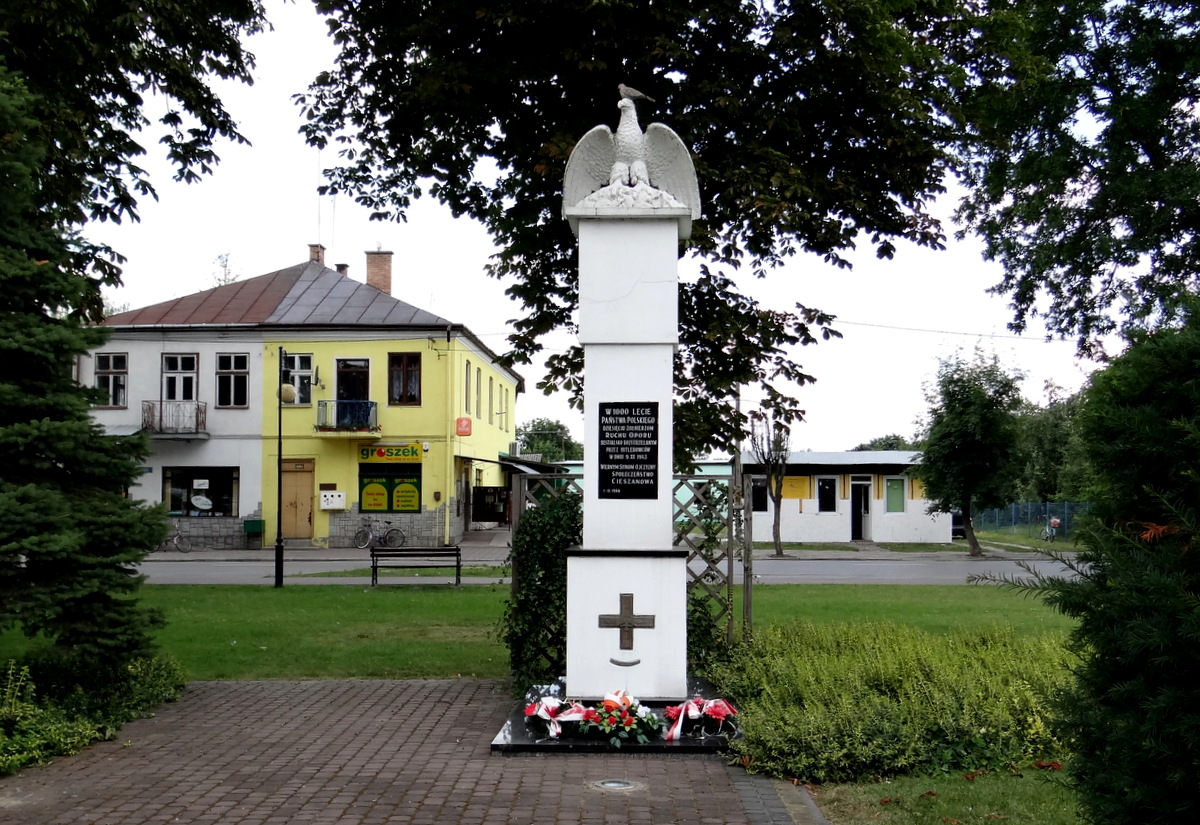
Memorial to Polish resistance members executed by the occupying German forces in 1943

On September 7, 1939, Cieszanów was bombed by the Luftwaffe, and five days later, first Wehrmacht units entered the town, arresting members of local government. The Germans soon retreated (see Molotov–Ribbentrop Pact), replaced by the Red Army, but in early October 1939, Cieszanów became part of General Government’ Zamość County. The town had a garrison of German border guard (Grenzschutz). The German occupying administration operated a forced labour camp for Jews in the town from June 1940 to October 1942. In 1942, almost all of the Jewish population of Cieszanów were murdered, mostly in Belzec.

On May 4, 1944, Cieszanów was destroyed by the UPA unit commanded by Iwan Szpontak and aided by local militia. During the attack several inhabitants were killed and the rest evacuated by the Home Army. On July 21, first Soviet troops entered the empty town. Residents returned, a post office was established (September 15, 1944), and on September 18, classes at the local elementary school started.

In 1957, Cieszanów had a population of 1352, but two years later, its population shrank to 1267. Until 1975, the town belonged to Rzeszów Voivodeship, and from 1975 until 1999, it was part of Przemyśl Voivodeship.

== People ==
- Marian Buczek – Roman Catholic bishop of the Roman Catholic Diocese of Kharkiv-Zaporizhia
- Łucja Charewiczowa – Polish scientist of the University of Lwów
- Petro Karmanskyi – Ukrainian poet
- Franciszek Lisowski – Roman Catholic bishop of the Diocese of Tarnów
