= Soum =

Soum may refer to:

== Places ==
- Sum (administrative division) (сум; also spelt "soum") of Mongolian inhabited areas, both in Mongolia, in the People's Republic of China (Inner Mongolia), and in Russia
- Soum, Boulkiemdé, Burkina Faso
- Soum Province, Burkina Faso

== People ==
- Soum Bill, Ivorian singer
- Henry Soum (1899–1983), Monaco politician

== Other uses ==
- Soum (currency) (also spelled "sum" or "som"), a traditional Turkic unit of currency

== See also ==
- Som (disambiguation)
- Sum (disambiguation)
- Sume (disambiguation)
