= Sume =

Sume may refer to:

== Places ==
- Sumé, Brazil
- Šume (Ivanjica), Serbia
- Šume (Topola), Serbia
- Sume Island, Zanzibar Archipelago, Tanzania
- Ricardo Detomasi Airport (ICAO airport code: SUME), Uruguay

== Persons ==
- Abdullah Elyasa Süme (born 1983), Turkish soccer footballer
- Cahit Süme (born 1972), Turkish boxer

== Other uses ==
- Sume (band), Greenlandic rock band
- Sume (수메), a tool; part of the 호미 - homi (tool)

== See also ==
- Sum (disambiguation)
- Soum (disambiguation)
- Sumi (disambiguation)
- Sumie (disambiguation)
- Sumy (disambiguation)
