= Sumie =

Sumie or Sumi-e or Sumi e or variation, may also refer to:

== People ==
Sumie is a feminine Japanese given name. Notable people with the name include:

- Sumie Awara (湶 純江, born 1952), Japanese long jumper
- Sumie Baba (born 1967), a Japanese voice actor
- Sumie Ishitaka, women's professional shogi player
- Sumie Mishima (1900–1992), Japanese writer, translator, educator
- Sumie Oinuma (born 1946), a Japanese volleyball player and Olympic medalist
- Sumie Sakai (born 1971), a Japanese professional wrestler and mixed martial artist
- Sumie Sakai (voice actress) (born 1945), a Japanese actress and voice actress

Fictional characters

- Sumie Taira (平良 すみえ, Taira Sumie), a character from Kamen Rider Fourze

== Music ==
- "SUMIE" (song), a tune by Toshiko Akiyoshi off the 1976 album Insights (album)
- Sumie (Toshiko Akiyoshi Quartet album), a 1971 jazz quartet album by pianist Toshiko Akiyoshi, or the title track
- Sumi-e (Toshiko Akiyoshi – Lew Tabackin Big Band album), a 1979 jazz album by the Toshiko Akiyoshi - Lew Tabackin Big Band, or the title track

== Other uses ==
- Sumie, an East Asian type of ink and wash painting
- SUMIE, a navigational beacon for Port Columbus International Airport involved in the crash of United Express Flight 6291

== See also ==
- Sumii, a Japanese surname
- Sume (disambiguation)
- Sumi (disambiguation)
- Sumy (disambiguation)
