= Sumii =

Sumii (written: 住井 or 角居) is a Japanese surname.

== People ==
Notable people with the surname include:

- Katsuhiko Sumii (角居 勝彦, born 1964), Japanese horse trainer
- Sue Sumii (住井 すゑ, 1902–1997), Japanese social reformer, writer, and novelist

== Characters ==
- Yuya Sumii (角居 裕也, Sumii Yūya), a fictional character from Kamen Rider Gaim; see List of Kamen Rider Gaim characters

== See also ==
- Sumi (disambiguation)
- Sumie (disambiguation)
