= Pavlo Honcharuk =

Ukrainian Roman Catholic prelate (born 1978)

- Diocesan Bishop of Roman Catholic Diocese of Kharkiv-Zaporizhia
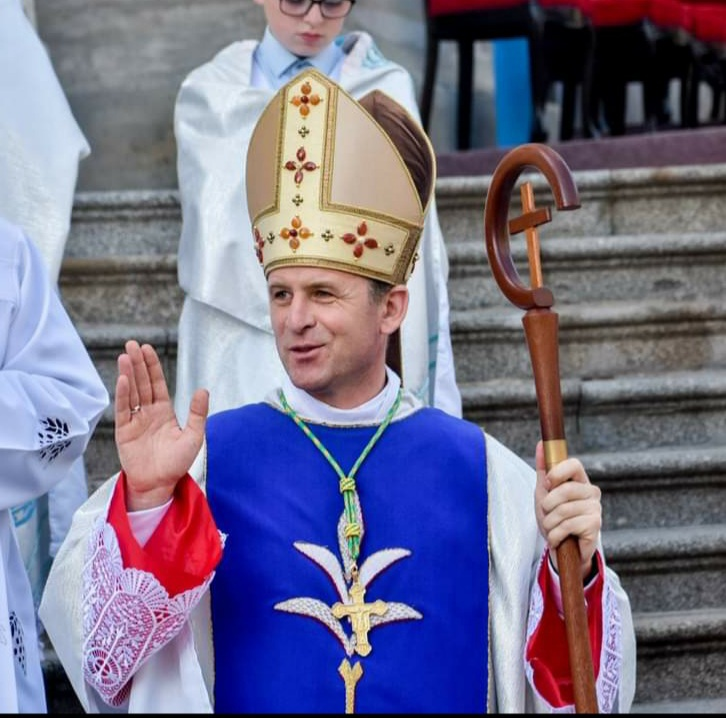
- Church: Roman Catholic Church
- Appointed: 6 January 2020
- Successor: Incumbent
- Other post: Parish priest in Dunaivtsi (2010–2016)

Orders
- Ordination: 22 June 2002 (Priest) by Jan Olszanski
- Consecration: 14 February 2020 (Bishop) by Claudio Gugerotti

Personal details
- Born: Pavlo Bronislavovych Honcharuk; 16 January 1978 (age 47) Kornachivka, Khmelnytskyi Oblast, Ukrainian SSR
- Coat of arms

Bishop Pavlo Honcharuk (Ukrainian: Павло Гончарук; born 16 January 1978) is a Ukrainian Roman Catholic prelate who serves as a Diocesan bishop of the Kharkiv-Zaporizhia since 6 January 2020.

== Life ==
Bishop Honcharuk was born in the Roman Catholic family of Bronislav and Mariya Honcharuk with 13 children (he is the fifth) in the Yarmolyntsi Raion of the Khmelnytskyi Oblast, but grew up in the town Horodok of the neighbouring raion. After graduation of the school education, he joined the Major Theological Seminary in Horodok in 1995; and was ordained as priest on 22 June 2002, for the Roman Catholic Diocese of Kamyanets-Podilskyi, after completed his philosophical and theological study.

After his ordination Fr. Honcharuk worked as assistant priest at the Cathedral of Sts. Peter and Paul in Kamianets-Podilskyi (2002–2005) and parish priest in Dunaivtsi (2010–2016), and meanwhile continued studies at the Cardinal Stefan Wyszyński University in Warsaw, Poland, with Licentiate of Canon Law degree in 2010.

He also served as the diocesan bursar in his native diocese and since 2003 until 2020 he was Director of the diocesan Caritas. In addition, he exercised the office of Defender of the Bond at the Diocesan Ecclesiastical Court from 2005 to 2016, the year in which he was appointed Judge of the same Court. In addition to these offices, he also was a military chaplain.

On 20 January 2020 he was appointed by the Pope Francis as the Diocesan Bishop of the Roman Catholic Diocese of Kharkiv-Zaporizhia.

== 2022 Russian invasion of Ukraine ==
As bishop of Kharkiv-Zaporizhia, Bishop Honcharuk found his diocese directly affected by the 2022 Russian invasion of Ukraine and spoke out publicly and often about the conflict and the suffering inflicted on the local population. In a message to Aid to the Church in Need, just days after the invasion began, he pointed out that the war was also bringing out good in many people. "I wish for this war to end as quickly as possible. But while evil has shown itself to be so strong, this has also exposed a lot of good. In a way, the evil we are experiencing also squeezes the good juice from the grape, and that good juice is our compassion, mutual support, and love. It shows our true faces, he said, adding “my message is short because we are under constant bombardment, and I am a little nervous, but we try to act normally. God bless you!” Despite the danger of the situation, he steadfastly refused to leave, saying he would stay as long as there were believers in Kharkiv.

The bishop documented attacks on Kharkiv, showing that despite Russian claims, civilian buildings were being targeted and destroyed, and stating, in an interview in August 2022 "If anyone is still stuck in the fantasy that Russia is only bombing military facilities, they are not only mistaken, but they are also badly deluded. Hospitals, businesses, schools, universities, kindergartens and homes have been destroyed. What is the purpose of shooting at residential buildings and at markets? They also destroy villages; some are simply razed to the ground. What is the purpose of doing this?" He also participated in food distributions and visited wounded civilians in the company of Bishop Mytrofan of the Orthodox Church of Ukraine. The war actually improved ecumenical relations, and the Orthodox bishop found refuge in the Catholic cathedral when his own residence was exposed to attacks. "When he came to visit, we invited him to stay with us, and he lived with us in the curia for almost four months. We travelled together, visited the sick in the hospital, people in the subway when it functioned as a shelter, and so on, he in his bishop's clothes and I in mine."

In an interview with Aid to the Church in Need, he showed concern for the lasting effects of the war on children. "I see a lot of trauma in people, in their eyes, their faces. The children especially will suffer the consequences later. There will certainly be psychiatric illnesses after the war. We will have our work cut out." In a later interview, also with ACN, he revisited the issue of trauma healing, saying "this is a very special part of my ministry. We have military chaplains who work with the soldiers, and we see that when they come back to their families they are completely changed, and this also affects the rest of the family. When we speak about people who lost their homes or their belongings, that is also a kind of trauma, and also prisoners of war who return, they carry a different kind of trauma and pain. It’s very complex. It’s very important to listen to the people and to try to help everyone in a different way".

“Even I, as the bishop, and the other priests and sisters, we all receive permanent psychological formation. This is very important because with it we can help to avoid psychological problems with the people, tensions and problems within the families, violence and even suicide, which is also a big problem”, he added.

Catholic Church titles
Preceded by Stanislav Shyrokoradiuk (as Apostolic Administrator)	Diocesan Bishop of Kharkiv-Zaporizhia; 2020–	Succeeded by Incumbent
