= Sum certain =

A sum certain is a specified and set amount of money owed by one person to another. It is a legal term of art, having specialized meaning in the law. Some kinds of legal claims can not be brought at all unless the sum certain can be pleaded. A document claimed to be a negotiable instrument can not be negotiated unless it is for a sum certain.
