= Stanislaw Padewski =

Stanislaw Padewski OFMCap
- Bishop of Kharkiv-Zaporizhia
- Native name: Станіслав Падевський
- Church: Catholic Church
- Diocese: Diocese of Kharkiv-Zaporizhzhia
- In office: 4 May 2002 – 19 March 2009
- Predecessor: Diocese erected
- Successor: Marian Buczek
- Previous posts: Auxiliary Bishop of Lviv (1998-2002); Titular Bishop of Tigias (1995-2002); Auxiliary Bishop of Kamianets-Podilskyi (1995-1998)

Orders
- Ordination: 24 February 1957 by Stanisław Rospond
- Consecration: 10 June 1995 by Antonio Franco

Personal details
- Born: 18 September 1932 Buczacz, Tarnopol Voivodeship, Poland
- Died: 29 January 2017 (aged 84) Sędziszów Małopolski, Podkarpackie Voivodeship, Poland

Stanislaw Padewski, OFMCap (born 18 September 1932 – 29 January 2017) was a Roman Catholic bishop. Ordained to priesthood in 1957, Padewski served as auxiliary bishop for the Diocese of Kamyanets-Podilskyi] from 1995 to 1998 and for the Archdiocese of Lviv from 1998 to 2002. He then served as bishop of the Diocese of Kharkiv-Zaporizhia from 2002 to 2009.

== Life ==
Born in 1932 near Buczacz (then Tarnopol Voivodeship in eastern Poland, today Butschatsch, Ukraine), Padewski was forcibly resettled with his family in December 1945 to Nowe Miasteczko near Nowa Sól in western Poland. Padewski attended the lyceum in Nowa Sól for two years before entering the Capuchin convent in Sędziszów Małopolski in 1949, where he took the religious name Wenanty. After his first vows in 1950, he made his perpetual vows on September 19, 1953 in the Capuchin monastery in Kraków.

From 1952 to 1957, Stanisław Padewski studied philosophy and theology at the Higher Spiritual Seminary of the Capuchin Friars in Kraków. Padewski was ordained a priest on February 24, 1957 by the auxiliary bishop in Kraków, Stanisław Rospond. In 1957, he graduated from the Kochanowski Lyceum in Kraków. From 1957 to 1959 he was a catechist and parish vicar in the Capuchin parish in Bytom. He then worked as a teacher in a Kraków school. In 1961, Padewski began studying at the Faculty of Humanities at the Catholic University of Lublin, which he continued from 1964 at the Jagiellonian University in Kraków and graduated in 1966 with a master's degree in Polish philology.

In 1964, he served as a chaplain at the University of Breslau for a year. Later he was a youth catechist at the middle school in Krosno. In the years 1970-1973 he served as guardian of the convent in Kraków and as confessor of the Saint Bernard Sisters and the Servants Maria Immaculata. After moving to Rozwadów, he was initially house vicar and catechist, from 1976 to 1985 he held the office of a guardian of the convent and parish. In the meantime he was given the position of vicar provincial. He then served as a chaplain in Piła and Sędziszów Małopolski.

From 1988 Padewski worked in the territory of the Ukrainian Soviet Socialist Republic, including as a chaplain in the parishes of Bar, Polonne, Kiev, Starokonstantynov and Shepetovka. In 1989, he settled in Starokonstantynov, where he tried to regain the monastery and church, and in 1990, he became a parish priest there. In 1991, he was the Provincial Delegate of Kraków in Ukraine and the Soviet Union. He looked after candidates for the postulancy and the novices, as representative of the provincial superior, coordinated contacts with ecclesiastical and civil authorities as well as the apostolate and the religious life of the brothers. In 1992, Padewski was house guardian and pastor in Vinnitsa, as well as being the pastor of the surrounding towns of Teplyk, Graczow, Kuna and Samchyntsi. In 1994, he received Ukrainian citizenship.

On April 13, 1995, Pope John Paul II appointed him titular bishop of Tigias and auxiliary bishop in Kamianets-Podilskyj. Padewski was consecrated by the Apostolic Nuncio in Ukraine, Archbishop Antonio Franco, on June 10, 1995; Co-consecrators were Marian Jaworski, Archbishop of Lemberg, and Jan Olszański MIC, Bishop of Kamianets-Podilskyj. His motto was Agnus vincet (The Lamb will conquer).

On October 10, 1998 Padeski was appointed auxiliary bishop in the Archdiocese of Lemberg. Four years later, on May 4, 2002, Pope John Paul II appointed him the first bishop of the diocese of Kharkiv-Zaporizhia, which was established on the same date. The inauguration in the Assumption Cathedral in Kharkiv took place on July 10, 2002.

On March 19, 2009, Pope Benedict XVI. accepted Padewski's retirement due to age. He returned to Poland and initially lived in the Capuchin convent in Kielce. However, after a few months he returned to the priestly ministry in Ukraine. In 2012 he settled in the convent in Sędziszów Małopolski, where he died on January 29, 2017.
