= Bulna (North Africa) =

Africa Proconsularis (125 AD)

Bulnensis also known as Bulna is a titular episcopal see of the Roman Catholic Church ascribed to the ecclesiastical province of Africa Proconsularis, as a suffragan of the Archdiocese of Carthage.

Very little is known of the ancient diocese. The bishopric is mentioned by Optatus of Milevi who lists the bishop Victor with the Proconsularis bishops at a council of 646. No other bishops are known to us and even the location of Bulna is not known, though doubtless it was in Tunisia.
