= Deanery of Sumy =

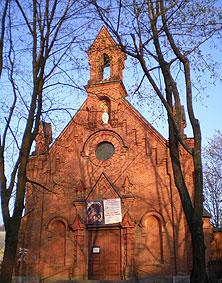
The Church of the Annunciation of the Blessed Virgin Mary in Sumy

The Deanery of Sumy is a part of the Diocese of Kharkiv-Zaporizhzhia of the Latin Catholic Church in Ukraine. It includes four north-eastern Ukrainian towns, Sumy, Romny, Konotop and Shostka.

The center of the deanery is located on the high right bank of the Psel River (left tributary of the Dnieper), in one of the old districts in the heart of the ancient Ukrainian capital Sumy. In the Middle Ages, the town was annexed by the possessions of the Orthodox monastery of St. Sophronius of the Wilderness (near Putivl). The unique cave priory, founded by the first Greek missionaries who came to Kievan Rus' from Byzantine, was razed almost to the ground in the 1960s by communists. The Church of the Annunciation of the Blessed Virgin Mary, the main church of the deanery, is located in Sumy.

Other significant Latin Catholic sites in the region include the Church of the Immaculate Conception of the Virgin Mary in Romny, the Church of Our Lady of Fatima in Konotop, and the Church of St. Joseph in Shostka.

== Sumy ==
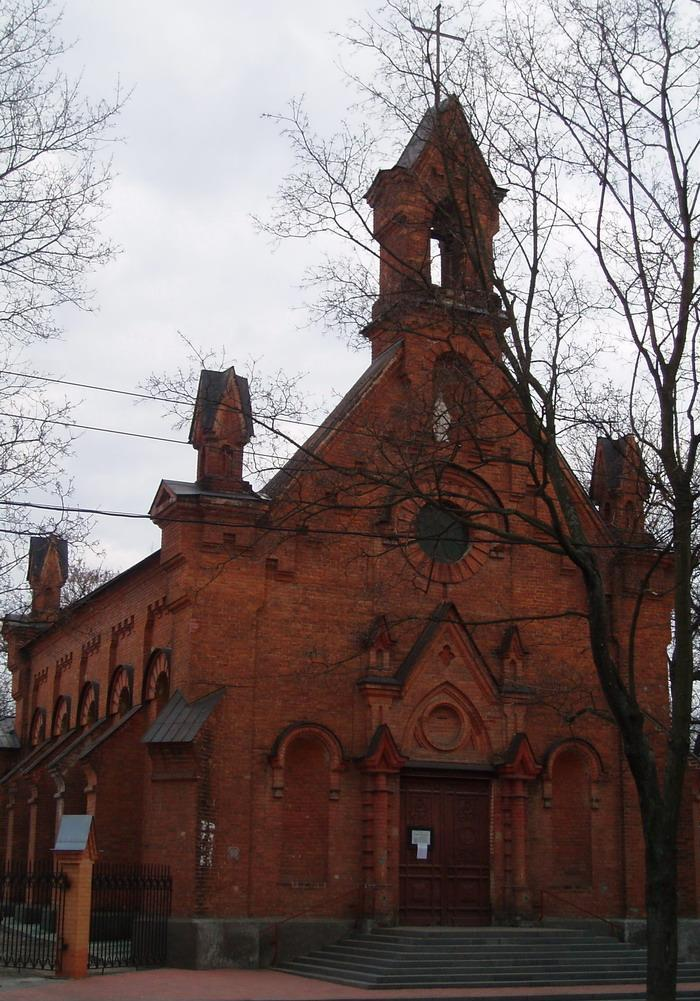
The Church of the Annunciation of the Blessed Virgin Mary in Sumy

The history of the comparatively new Latin Catholic parish in town Sumy is dramatic. It faced a number of ordeals while Ukraine was part of the Soviet Union. At the end of the 19th century Latin Catholics in Sumy had decided to build their own church, which was approved in 1900 with the aid of famous patron Maecenas Paul Kharitonenko (1853–1914), at whose sugar refineries, the largest in Europe and Russia, worked many specialists from Europe, chiefly Latin Catholics from Poland and the Czech Republic. The Church of the Annunciation of the Blessed Virgin Mary, in Gothic style, was built in 1901. "...All attempts to find information about the building process as well as its interior have been unsuccessful" to date. Consecrated in 1911 by Jan Tsepliak, bishop of Mogilev, the Church of the Annunciation of the Blessed Virgin Mary was closed by authorities two decades later, and was not used as intended. After World War II, a museum, then a gym, were located there for 50 years. Only after the fall of the USSR was the church again used as a Latin Catholic church and in spring 1998 it was solemnly reconsecrated.

The first masses (1911–1915) at the church were led by parish priest Fr. Theodor Ryllo. He also gave lessons in religion at Alexander High School, 1st and 2nd High Schools, the technical educational institution and the military college in Sumy, and at the high school in Lebedin.

His successor (1916–1919) was chaplain Fr. A. Krzhivitsky, whose assistants during festivities were Fr. Florian Garaburda and Fr. Jozef Varpekhovsky.

The last registration was on November 20, 1919. Archive documents witness that on February 21, 1926, believers met to form a parish council and commission for inspections. The last mass before the church was closed down was held in 1932 by Fr. Vagonis. Some masses were conducted during World War II.

Reformation, proclaimed by Mikhail Gorbachev, had enabled believers to begin the struggle of reviving the town's Latin Catholic parish. And soon, after Ukraine had found independence, at the end of 1991, the parish reopened.

In the beginning, parishioners gathered for services every two weeks (1991 – August 1992) conducted by the parish priest of the Church of the Assumption of the Blessed Virgin Mary in Kharkiv, Fr. George Zyminsky, directly on the church's stairs. After the church building had been returned to the parish, ill-wishers turned out the lights during the service.

The first priest (September 1992 – February 1995) of the new parish was a priest appointed from the Diocese of Zhytomyr, Fr. Vitaly Skomarovsky. During his service, in May 1994, the building again began to be used as a church.

The following two parish priests were Fr. Gennadius Bilinsky (March 1995 – September 1997) and Fr. Felix Svintsitsky (September 1997 – August 1999). During the latter's service, the church was reconsecrated by the Bishop of Zhytomyr, Jan Purvinsky, on 25 March 1998.

The fourth parish priest (September 1999 – June 2006) was Fr. Stanislav Tanatarov.

For the celebration of the 2000th anniversary of Christmas, the Sacred Heart of Jesus Chapel (about 4 m (13 ft) high) was erected on the left side of the church's courtyard. A bronze statue of the Blessed Virgin Mary with an Infant in her arms was placed on the left side of the church and building behind it, where the residents of the parish priest and Latin Catholic religious mission are accommodated. Standing on a red brick pedestal with a quadrilateral base of black stone, surrounded by flowers, grass and trees, the polished figure is reminiscent of the sacramental.

Since 2002 the church's canteen has been operated by members of the Secular Franciscan Order, a branch of which has been based out of the parish since spring of 1999.

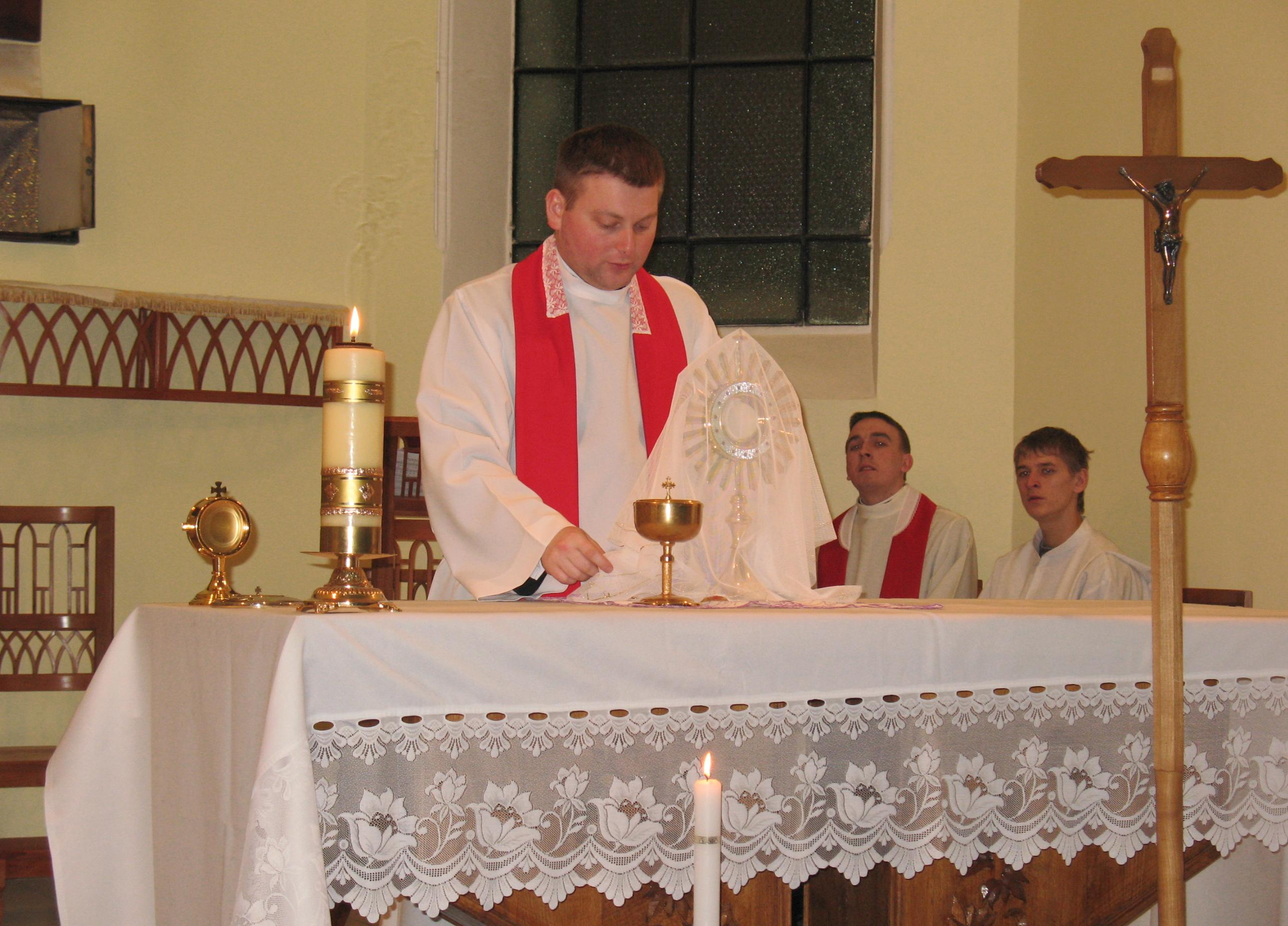
Fr. Arthur Surovsky (left) and behind him Fr. Voicheck Stasevich (center) during mass

Tanatarov's successors were parish priest Fr. Arthur Surovsky (since 2006) and parish priest Fr. Voicheck Stasevich (since August 2008).

The church has successfully developed a Sunday School (with the aid of pious nuns), a library, theatre, museum, spiritual music band, and various groups, including spiritual culture groups.

Emblem of Caritas Spes Sumy

For charitable work in the community, the parish of the Annunciation of the Blessed Virgin Mary founded the Latin Catholic mission Caritas Spes Sumy, which acts as a branch of the All-Ukrainian Latin Catholic religious mission Caritas Spes Ukraina.

On February 6, 2008, and April 15, 2008, websites were created for the mission and parish under the titles Caritas Spes Sumy and Ave Maria to elucidate their activities. To support this aim, the parish publishes a bulletin named "Ave!" on the church's history and parish life. On September 29, 2008, the websites were closed by a decision of the new parish administration. Soon after, the parish began a new website, title To the Glory of Jesus Christ.

On January 15, 2009, the author of the former websites Caritas Spes Sumy and Ave Maria created a website for the Sumian Historical Web Society under the title Ave Maria to elucidate different historical subjects, including the history of religion and the church.

== Romny ==
The history of the Church of the Annunciation of the Blessed Virgin Mary in Sumy depicts an example of the persecution of the Catholic Church in the Soviet Union.

Likewise, the Church of the Immaculate Conception of the Virgin Mary in Romny underwent a similar test. For a short period after the 1917–1923 Russian Civil War, the church, in Romanesque architectural style, was confiscated. The chapel was subject to total destruction. Nothing remains of its existence but a strip of ruined wall, which in the past joined the chapel to the temple. The church was used for other purposes for decades (the Ministry of Education turned it over to the disposal of the polytechnic secondary school, which was housed on the premises.)

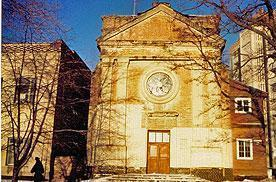
The Church of the Immaculate Conception of the Virgin Mary in Romny (present)

The parish could be content with very little–open-air services were conducted by a priest who came from Sumy, across the street in the courtyard which belonged to a married couple who had become parishioners. To return the church to the ownership of the Holy See was a difficult task. However, Fr. Stanislav Tanatarov, appointed to Sumy in September 1999, always considered it possible, and at a special conference convened in Romny he proclaimed his aspiration to reconsecrate the church. He initially succeeded in reclaiming the church's first floor and then the ground floor, the minister's house, and other edifices.

== Konotop ==
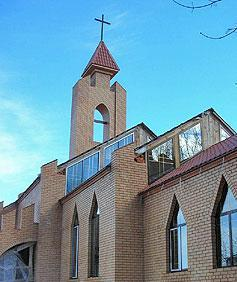
The Church of Our Lady of Fatima in Konotop, Ukraine

The Church of Our Lady of Fatima, third in the Deanery of Sumy, has come a long way before a new Latin Catholic church was constructed in 2005 in Konotop in modern style and consecrated.

Called Seven Winds by the local inhabitants, it is one of the town's sights owing to Jeff Woolthy, a young member of the Holy Apostles parish in Colorado Springs, USA. He made the donation to the Church of Our Lady of Fatima in memory of his prematurely deceased wife. The parish priest of Konotop is Fr. Zbignev.

== Shostka ==
The center of the fourth parish, a chapel named in honour of Saint Joseph, is currently located in a private home in Shostka. Its parish priest is Fr. Thomas.
