= Stanislav Shyrokoradiuk =

Ukrainian bishop

Stanislav Shyrokoradiuk, O.F.M.
- Bishop of Odesa-Simferopol
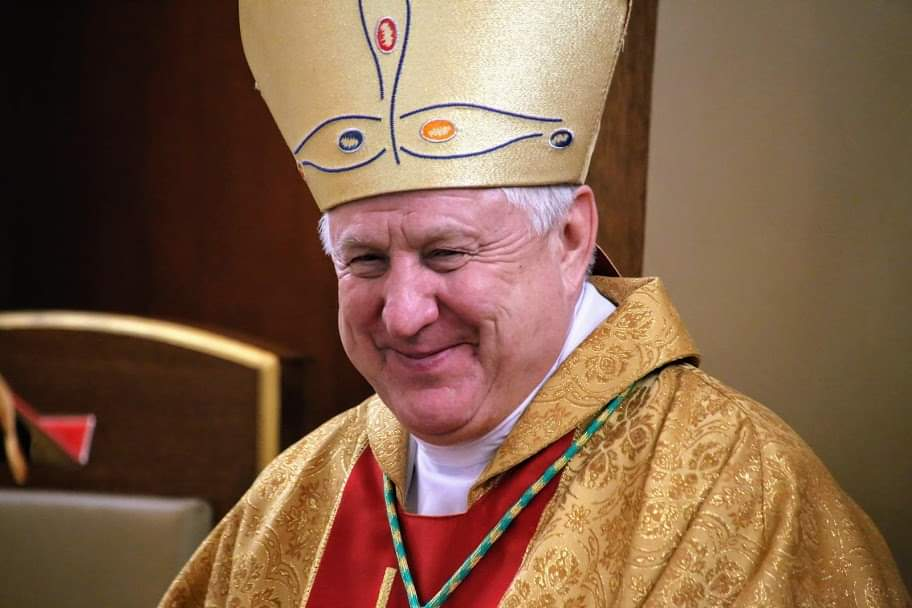
- Church: Roman Catholic Church
- Appointed: 18 February 2020
- Predecessor: Bronisław Bernacki
- Previous posts: Auxiliary Bishop of Kyiv-Zhytomyr (1994-2014); Bishop of Kharkiv-Zaporizhzhia (2014-2019)

Orders
- Ordination: 4 June 1984
- Consecration: 6 January 1995 by Pope John Paul II

Personal details
- Born: Stanisław Szyrokoradiuk; 23 June 1956 (age 69) Kornachivka, Khmelnytskyi Oblast, Ukrainian SSR
- Motto: Auxilium Nostrum (Our Help)
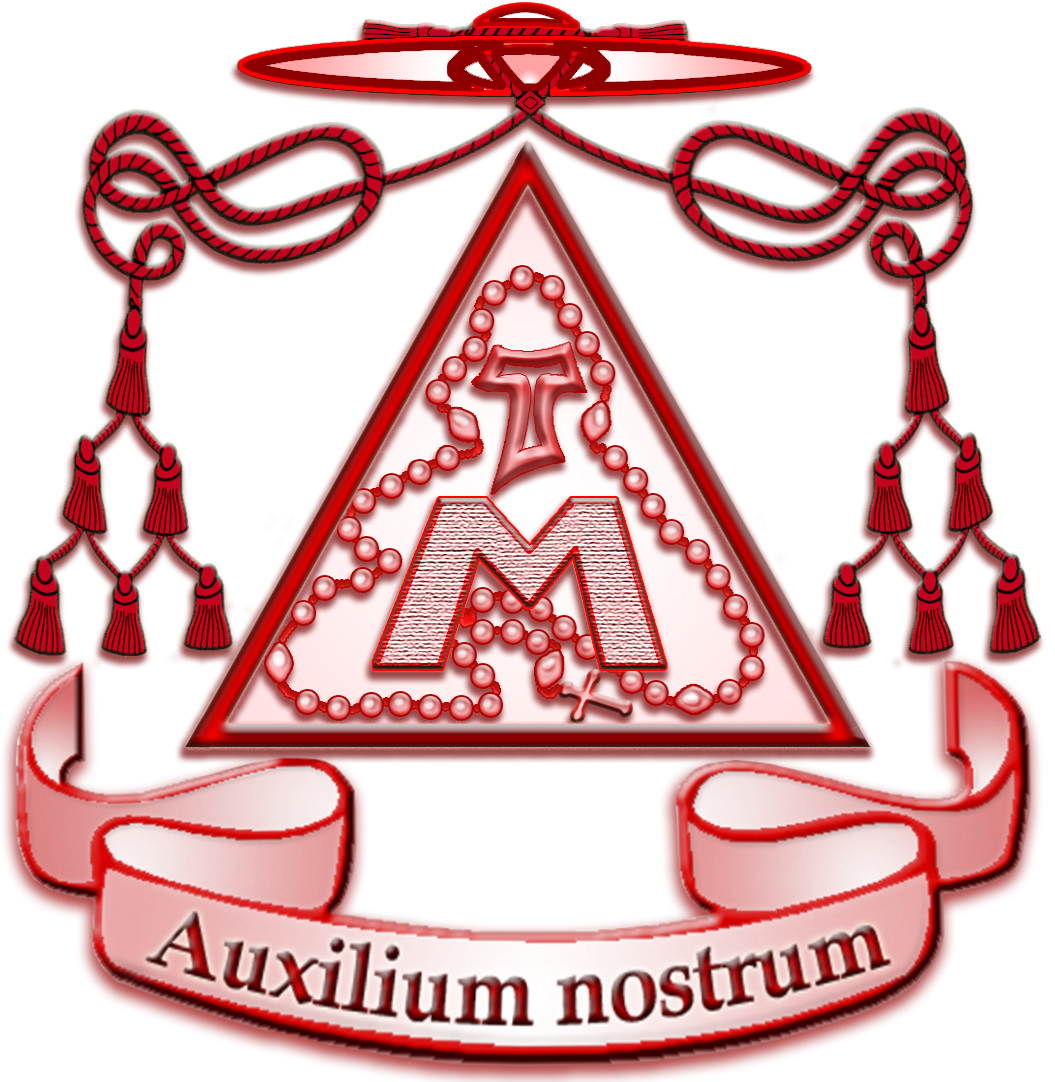
- Coat of arms

Stanislav Shyrokoradiuk, O.F.M. (Ukrainian: Станіслав Широкорадюк, pol. Stanisław Szyrokoradiuk; born 23 June 1956) is a Ukrainian prelate of the Catholic Church who became Bishop of Odesa-Simferopol since February 2020 after a year as Coadjutor Bishop there. He was Bishop of Kharkiv-Zaporizhzhia from 2014 to 2019 and Auxiliary Bishop of Roman Catholic Diocese of Kyiv-Zhytomyr from 1994 to 2014.

== Life ==
Shyrokoradiuk was born into a Polish Roman-Catholic family in Kornachivka (Kornaczówka), Yarmolyntsi Raion, Khmelnytskyi Oblast, Ukrainian SSR, on 23 June 1956. He graduated from a railway college in Zdolbuniv, performed his compulsory service in the Soviet Army from 1974 to 1976, and worked in factories. In 1980 he entered the Major Theological Seminary in Riga, Latvia, and one year later, he clandestinely joined the Franciscans. After completing his studies in theology and philosophy, he was ordained a priest on 4 June 1984.

He returned to Ukraine in 1984 and worked as a parish priest in Slavuta and Polonne from 1984 to 1994. He made his solemn profession as a Franciscan on 26 August 1988, again in secret.

On 26 November 1994, Pope John Paul II appointed him Auxiliary Bishop of Zhytomyr (Note: The Diocese of Zhytomyr became the Diocese of Kyiv-Zhytomyr on 25 November 1998.) and Titular Bishop of Surista. On 6 January 1995, he was consecrated a bishop by Pope John Paul.

From 1996 to 2016 he was national director of Caritas-Spes Ukraine.

He was also Apostolic Administrator of the Lutsk from 24 July 2012 until 12 April 2014.

He was named Bishop of Kharkiv-Zaporizhzhia on 12 April 2014. He was also Apostolic Administrator of Kharkiv-Zaporizhzhia from 2 February 2019 to 6 January 2020.

On 2 February 2019, Pope Francis appointed him Bishop Coadjutor of Odesa-Simferopol and on 18 February 2020 he became bishop there.

== 2022 Russian invasion of Ukraine ==
As Catholic bishop of Odesa, Shyrokoradiuk found his diocese heavily affected by the war and spoke out against the Russian invasion. Under his direction the Church helped provide humanitarian assistance and places of safety for refugees and children. The diocese also organised spiritual support for its flock: "we pray daily for peace. It’s important to us to pray for everyone, but especially for those who have died. Every day we celebrate a Mass with a requiem for all those who have died, including the fallen soldiers and all war victims".

During an online conference with Aid to the Church in Need, the bishop claimed that both Russians and Ukrainians were victims in the war, each in their own way. "We Ukrainians are the victims of the war; the Russian people are the victims of propaganda. I hope that their eyes will be opened, so that peace can come."

== Notes ==
Catholic Church titles
Preceded by William Edwin Franklin	Titular Bishop of Surista; 1994–2014	Succeeded by Krzysztof Stefan Włodarczyk
Preceded by Markijan Trofimiak	Apostolic Administrator of Roman Catholic Diocese of Lutsk; 2012–2014	Succeeded by Vitaliy Skomarovskyi
Preceded by Marian Buczek	Diocesan Bishop of Kharkiv-Zaporizhzhia; 2014–2020	Succeeded by Pavlo Honcharuk
