= Sum =

Sum most commonly means the total of two or more numbers added together; see addition.

Sum can also refer to:

== Mathematics ==
- Sum (category theory), the generic concept of summation in mathematics
- Sum, the result of summation, the addition of a sequence of numbers
- 3SUM, a term from computational complexity theory
- Band sum, a way of connecting mathematical knots
- Connected sum, a way of gluing manifolds
- Digit sum, in number theory
- Direct sum, a combination of algebraic objects
  - Direct sum of groups
  - Direct sum of modules
  - Direct sum of permutations
  - Direct sum of topological groups
- Einstein summation, a way of contracting tensor indices
- Empty sum, a sum with no terms
- Indefinite sum, the inverse of a finite difference
- Kronecker sum, an operation considered a kind of addition for matrices
- Matrix addition, in linear algebra
- Minkowski addition, a sum of two subsets of a vector space
- Power sum symmetric polynomial, in commutative algebra
- Prefix sum, in computing
- Pushout (category theory) (also called an amalgamated sum or a cocartesian square, fibered coproduct, or fibered sum), the colimit of a diagram consisting of two morphisms f : Z → X and g : Z → Y with a common domainor pushout, leading to a fibered sum in category theory
- QCD sum rules, in quantum field theory
- Riemann sum, in calculus
- Rule of sum, in combinatorics
- Subset sum problem, in cryptography
- Sum rule in differentiation, in calculus
- Sum rule in integration, in calculus
- Sum rule in quantum mechanics
- Wedge sum, a one-point union of topological spaces
- Whitney sum, of fiber bundles
- Zero-sum problem in combinatorics

== Computing and technology ==
- Sum (Unix), a program for generating checksums
- StartUp-Manager, a program to configure GRUB, GRUB2, Usplash and Splashy
- Sum type, a computer science term

== Art and entertainment ==
- Sum, the first beat (pronounced like "some") in any rhythmic cycle of Hindustani classical music
- "Sum", a song by Pink Floyd from The Endless River
- Sum: Forty Tales from the Afterlives, a 2009 collection of short stories by David Eagleman
- Sum 41, a Canadian punk band
- SUM, the computer in Goat Song (novelette) story by Poul Anderson in Magazine of Fantasy and Science Fiction, (1972).

== Organizations ==
- Senter for utvikling og miljø (Centre for Development and the Environment), a research institute which is part of the University of Oslo
- Soccer United Marketing, the for-profit marketing arm of Major League Soccer
- Society for the Establishment of Useful Manufactures, a now-defunct private state-sponsored corporation founded in 1791 to promote industrial development along the Passaic River in New Jersey in the United States
- The State University of Management, a Russian university
- Save Uganda Movement, a Ugandan militant opposition group
- Ukrainian Youth Association (Спілка української молоді, Spilka Ukraïns'koï Molodi), a youth organization in Ukraine and countries with a Ukrainian diaspora

== Places ==
- Sum (administrative division), an administrative division in Mongolia, China, and some areas of Russia
  - Sum (Mongolia), an administrative division of Mongolia
- SUM, the IATA airport code for the Sumter Airport in Sumter County, South Carolina, U.S.

== Other uses ==
- Sum, an old name for the Finns in East Slavic languages, derived from the word Suomi, "Finland"
- Soum (currency) (also spelled "sum"), a unit of currency used in some Turkic-speaking countries of Central Asia
- SUM (interbank network), an interbank network in 42 U.S. states
- SUM, the ISO 639-3 code for the Sumo language
- Cen (surname) 岑, a Chinese surname sometimes romanized as Sum
- Shěn (surname) 沈, a Chinese surname sometimes romanized as Sum
- Cogito, ergo sum, Latin for: "I think, therefore I am"
- Sum certain, a legal term

== See also ==
- Addition
- Additive category
- Preadditive category
