= Sumitani =

Sumitani is a surname. Notable people with the surname include:

- Ginjiro Sumitani (炭谷 銀仁朗, born 1987), Japanese baseball player
- Masaki Sumitani (住谷 正樹, born 1975), Japanese comedian and wrestler
- Masamine Sumitani (隅谷 正峯, 1921–1998), Japanese swordsmith
- Sosuke Sumitani (炭谷 宗佑, born 1980), Japanese television announcer
