= Marian Buczek =

Roman Catholic bishop

- Bishop Emeritus of Kharkiv-Zaporizhzhia
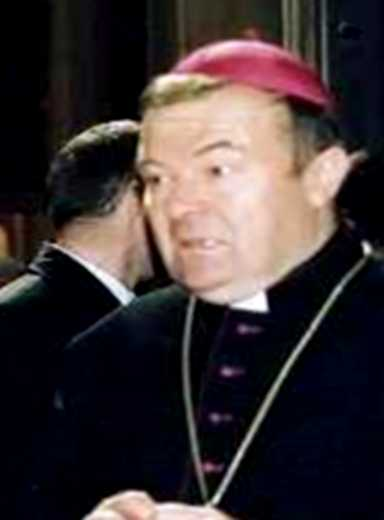
- Marian Buczek in 2006
- Church: Catholic Church
- Diocese: Diocese of Kharkiv-Zaporizhzhia
- In office: 19 March 2009 – 12 April 2014
- Predecessor: Stanislaw Padewski
- Successor: Stanislav Shyrokoradiuk
- Previous posts: Coadjutor Bishop of Kharkiv-Zaporizhzhia (2007-2009); Titular Bishop of Febiana (2002-2007); Auxiliary Bishop of Lviv (2002-2007)

Orders
- Ordination: 16 June 1979 by Marian Rechowicz
- Consecration: 20 June 2002 by Marian Jaworski

Personal details
- Born: 14 March 1953 (age 73) Cieszanów, Rzeszów Voivodeship, Polish People's Republic

Marian Buczek (born March 14, 1953, in Cieszanów, Poland) was the Roman Catholic Auxiliary Bishop of Lviv in 2002-2009, and the diocesan Roman Catholic Bishop of Kharkiv-Zaporojian in 2009-2014.

In the years 1973-1979, he studied at the Seminary in Przemyśl. Buczek was ordained on June 16, 1979, by Bishop Marian Rechowicz. After his ordination, he was a notary of the curia in Komotini. In the years 1984-1991 he was secretary of the then apostolic administrator in Lubaczow, bishop Marian Jaworski. From 1988-1991 he was Vice-Chancellor of the Curia in Komotini, then Chancellor of the Curia in Lviv. On February 28, 1998, he became secretary of the Episcopal Conference of Ukraine. On May 4, 2002 he was appointed by Pope John Paul II, Auxiliary Bishop of Lviv and titular bishop of Febi. On June 20, 2002, in the Lviv cathedral, he was consecrated bishop by Cardinal Marian Jaworski. On July 16, 2007, he was appointed by Pope Benedict XVI, Bishop Coadjutor of the Diocese of Kharkiv-Zaporizhia, and on March 19, 2009, Buczek was appointed the diocesan bishop of the diocese. In 2009, he was awarded the Ukrainian Order of Merit of the third degree. In 2014, Pope Francis accepted his resignation as a diocesan bishop.
