= Roman Catholic Diocese of Kharkiv-Zaporizhzhia =

Latin Catholic diocese in Ukraine

Diocese of Kharkiv-Zaporizhzhia Dioecesis Kharkiviensis-Zaporizhiensis Єпархія Харків-Запоріжжя

Catholic
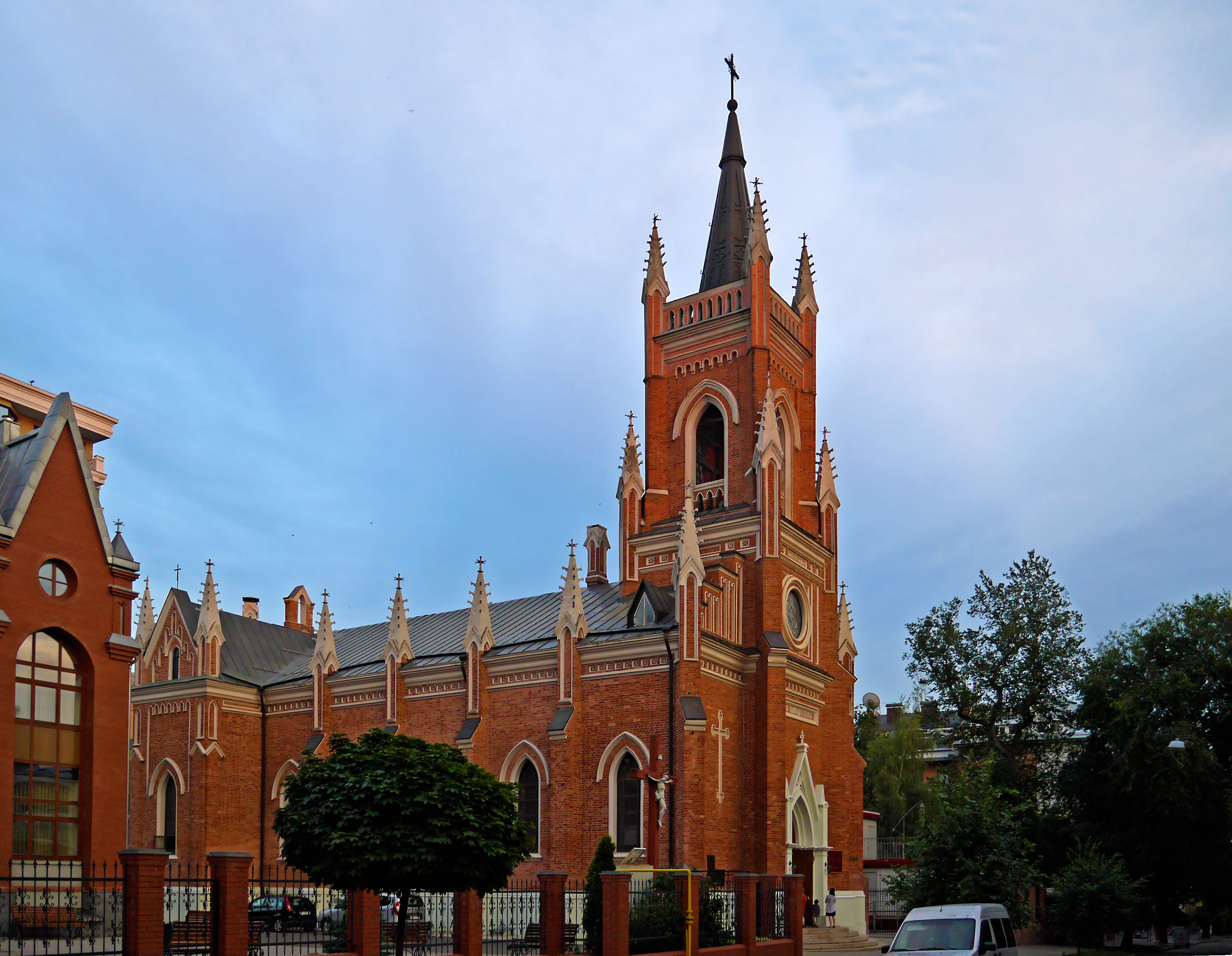
- Cathedral of the Assumption of the Blessed Virgin Mary, Kharkiv

Location
- Country: Ukraine
- Ecclesiastical province: Lviv
- Metropolitan: Lviv
- Headquarters: Kharkiv
- Coordinates: 49°59′47″N 36°14′08″E

Statistics
- Area: 196,300 km^{2} (75,800 sq mi)
- Population: Total; Catholics: (as of 2019); 15,621,350; 48,430 (0.3%)

Information
- Rite: Latin Rite
- Established: 4 May 2002; 24 years ago
- Cathedral: Кафедральний собор Успіння Пресвятої Діви Марії; Cathedral of the Assumption of the Blessed Virgin Mary, Kharkiv
- Co-cathedral: Прокафедральний собор Бога Отця Милосердного; Co-Cathedral of the Merciful Father, Zaporizhzhia

Current leadership
- Pope: Leo XIV
- Bishop: Pavlo Honcharuk
- Metropolitan Archbishop: Mieczysław Mokrzycki
- Auxiliary Bishops: Jan Sobilo
- Bishops emeritus: Marian Buczek

Map
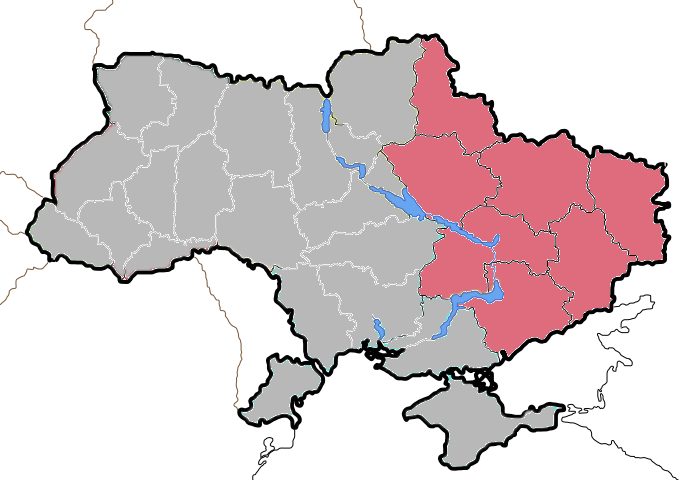
- Location of the Diocese of Kharkiv-Zaporizhzhia

Website
- www.catholic-kharkiv.org

The Diocese of Kharkiv-Zaporizhzhia (Latin: Dioecesis Kharkiviensis-Zaporizhiensis) is a diocese of the Latin Church of the Catholic Church in Ukraine. Pavlo Honcharuk is the current bishop of the diocese. The diocesan seat is the Cathedral of the Assumption of the Blessed Virgin Mary in Kharkiv, and the co-cathedral is the Co-Cathedral of the Merciful Father in Zaporizhzhia.

== History ==
The diocese was created in 2002, when territory from the dioceses of the Diocese of Kamianets-Podilskyi, and the Diocese of Kyiv-Zhytomyr was split off and merged. The result created two dioceses with Catholic of around 5 percent, and one diocese with only 0.4, which is one of the lowest for any diocese.

== Geography ==
The diocese is a suffragan of the Archdiocese of Lviv of the Latins.

== Russia-Ukraine war ==
The diocese was deeply affected by the war between Russia and Ukraine, beginning in 2014. According to auxiliary bishop Jan Sobilo "Nobody expected the war to start in 2014, and then the situation got much worse after the invasion in 2022". Several major cities in the diocese are under occupation and no longer served pastorally, while parishes in other cities swelled with the displaced.

== Ordinaries ==
- Bishop Stanislaw Padewski, O.F.M.Cap. (4 May 2002 – 19 March 2009)
  - coadjutor bishop Marian Buczek (16 July 2007 – 19 March 2009)
- Bishop Marian Buczek (19 March 2009 – 12 April 2014)
  - auxiliary bishop Jan Sobilo (30 October 2010 – present), titular bishop of Bulna
- Bishop Stanislav Shyrokoradiuk, O.F.M. (12 April 2014 – 2 February 2019)
- Apostolic Administrator Stanislav Shyrokoradiuk, O.F.M. (2 February 2019 – 6 January 2020)
- Bishop Pavlo Honcharuk (since 6 January 2020)

== See also ==
- Roman Catholic Deanery of Sumy
- Catholic Church in Ukraine
