= Shreyaa Sumi =

American model

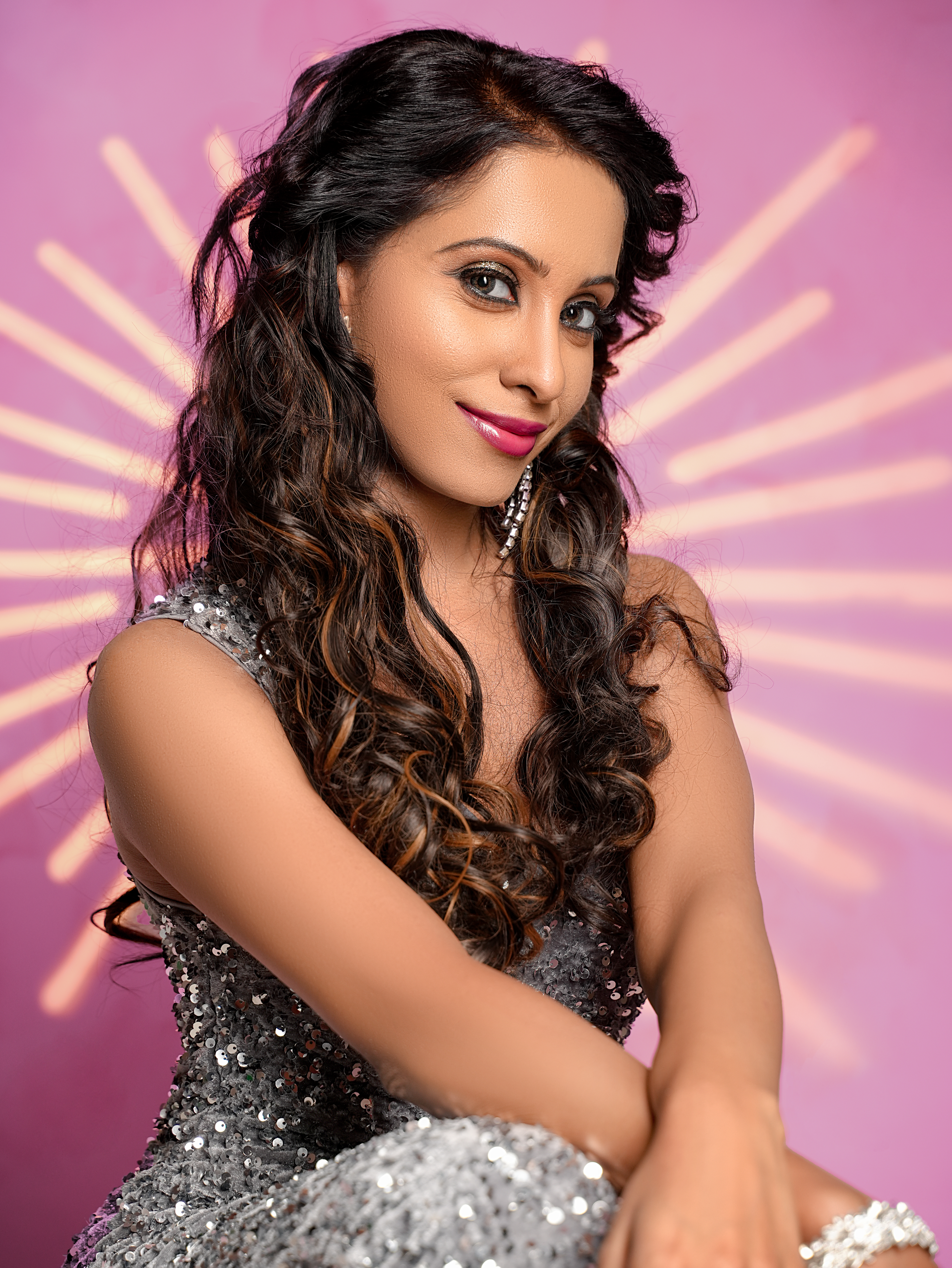
- Born: 29 April 1987 (age 39); Tamil Nadu, India
- Occupation: Model
- Height: 1.67 m (5 ft 6 in)
- Website: https://www.shreyaasumi.com/

Shreyaa Sumi (born 29 April 1987) is an Indian-American model, actress, and beauty pageant titleholder who was crowned Mrs Universe Asia USA 2022–2023.

== Pageantry ==
Shreyaa Sumi represents a variety of multinational corporations and nonprofits as a brand ambassador and as a global celebrity.

Shreyaa Sumi was officially selected to represent the Mrs. Universe Asia USA-2022 title which was held in Sofia, Bulgaria. She won the title among many other participants. Shreyaa is seen on the Global Billboard ad campaign in Los Angeles, USA. Despite being married and a mother of a child, Shreyaa remains in headlines for being active in her fashion and modeling career.

== Awards ==
- Forever Star India Award 2021
