= Superior Institute of Religious Sciences of St. Thomas Aquinas =

Catholic university in Kyiv, Ukraine

Coordinates: 50.4664°N 30.4708°E

Institutum Superius Scientiarum Religiosarum a Sancto Thoma Aquinate in civitate Kioviensi
- Вищий інститут релігійних наук святого Томи Аквінського
- Former name: Catholic Theological College of St. Thomas Aquinas (1992-2000)
- Established: 1992
- Director: Petro Balog O.P.
- Students: 210
- Location: Kyiv, Ukraine
- Website: http://tomainstytut.org/en/

The Superior Institute of Religious Sciences of St. Thomas Aquinas is an institution of higher education in Kyiv (Ukraine), conducted by the Dominican Friars of the Vicariate General of Russia and Ukraine and, affiliated to the Pontifical University of St. Thomas Aquinas (Angelicum).

== See also ==
- Pontifical University of St. Thomas Aquinas (Angelicum)
