= Cathedral of the Assumption of the Blessed Virgin Mary, Kharkiv =

Coordinates: 49.9964°N 36.2350°E

Cathedral of the Assumption of the Blessed Virgin Mary
- Кафедральний собор Успіння Пресвятої Діви Марії
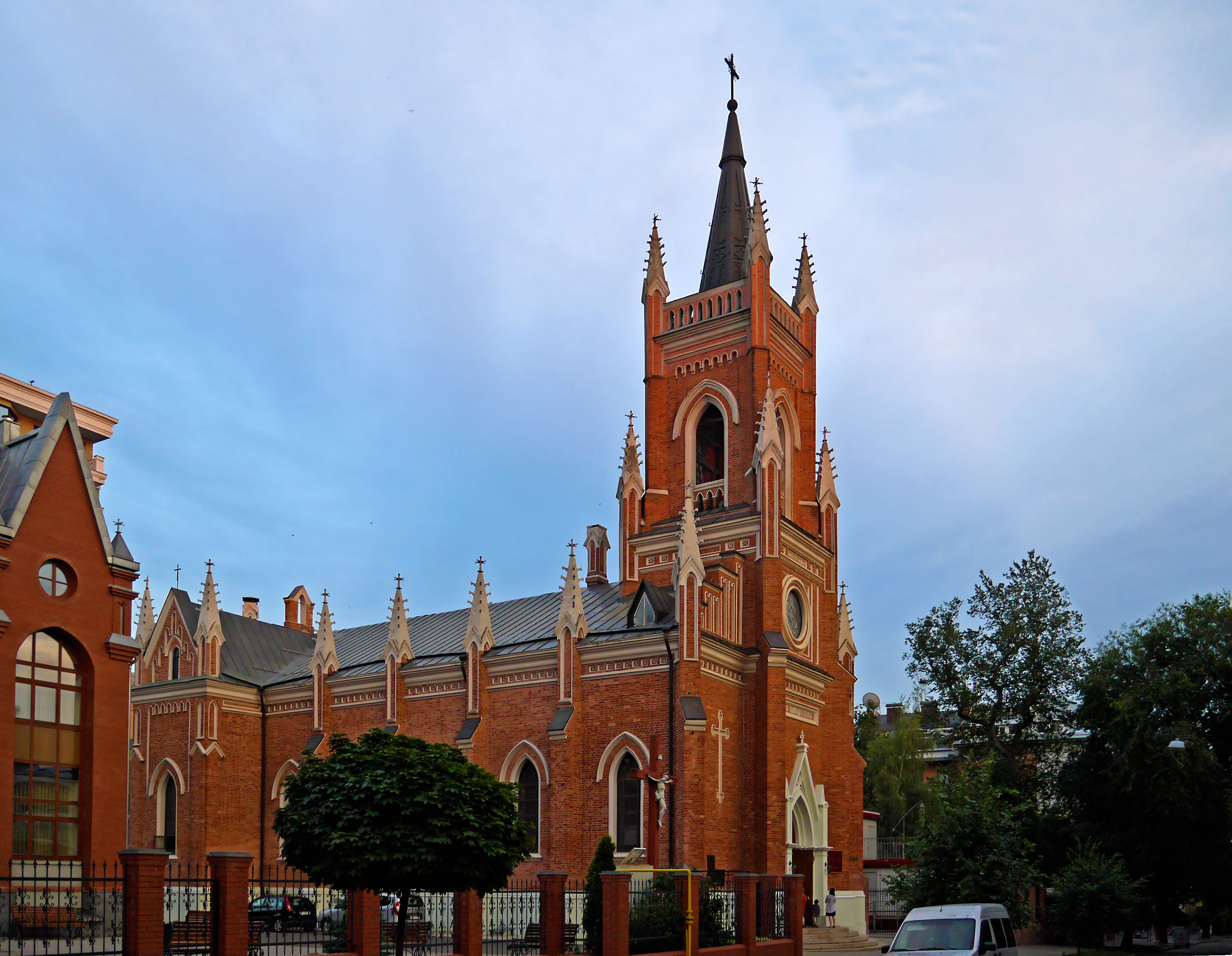
- Cathedral of the Assumption of the Blessed Virgin Mary
- Location: Kharkiv
- Country: Ukraine
- Denomination: Latin Church

Immovable Monument of Local Significance of Ukraine
- Official name: «Костел» (Church)
- Type: Urban Planning, Architecture
- Reference no.: 7047-Ха

The Cathedral of the Assumption of the Blessed Virgin Mary (Ukrainian: Кафедральний собор Успіння Пресвятої Діви Марії, romanized: Kafedralnyi sobor Uspinnia Presviatoi Divy Marii) also called Assumption Cathedral is the name given to a religious building affiliated with the Latin Catholic Church and is located in the city of Kharkiv, in Kharkiv Oblast in east part of the European country of Ukraine. The temple was built in neo-Gothic style between 1887 and 1892 on Gogol Street. The author of the temple project was a Polish architect, Bolesław Michałowski (1830-1909). He designed about 30 buildings in Kharkiv.

In the 1930s, during the period of the Soviet Union the church was closed and turned into secular Local housed, among others, a cinema and an installation of the Communist Party. In 1992 the temple was returned to the Catholic faithful. Since 2002 is the cathedral of the new diocese of Kharkiv - Zaporizhzhia (Dioecesis Kharkiviensis-Zaporizhiensis, Харківсько-Запорізька дієцезія) that was created by bull "Ad plenius prospiciendum" of Pope John Paul II.

== See also ==
- Catholic Church in Ukraine
- Cathedral of the Assumption of the Blessed Virgin Mary

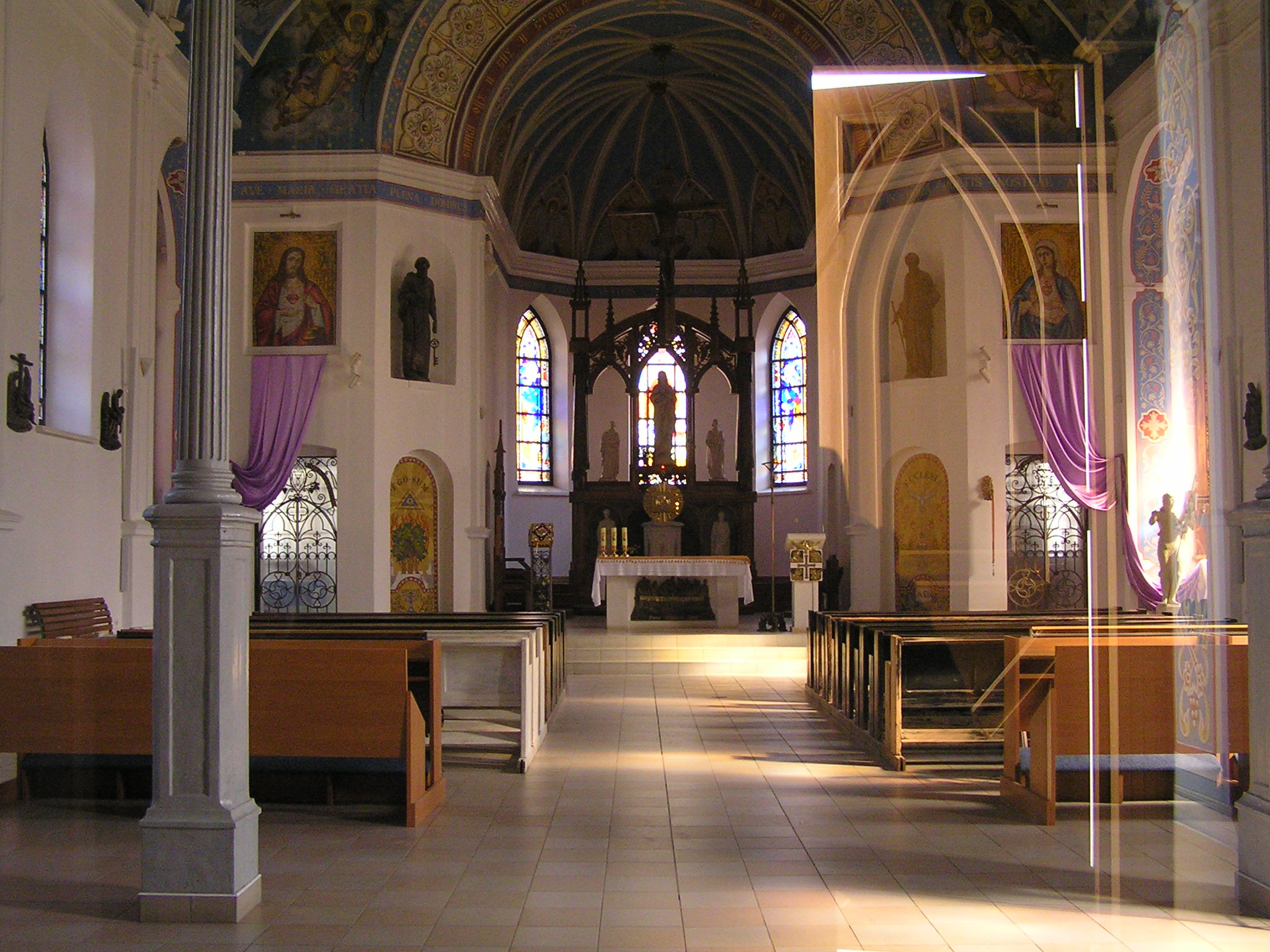
Internal view
