= Our Lady of Berdyczow =

Icon of the Virgin Mary in Ukraine

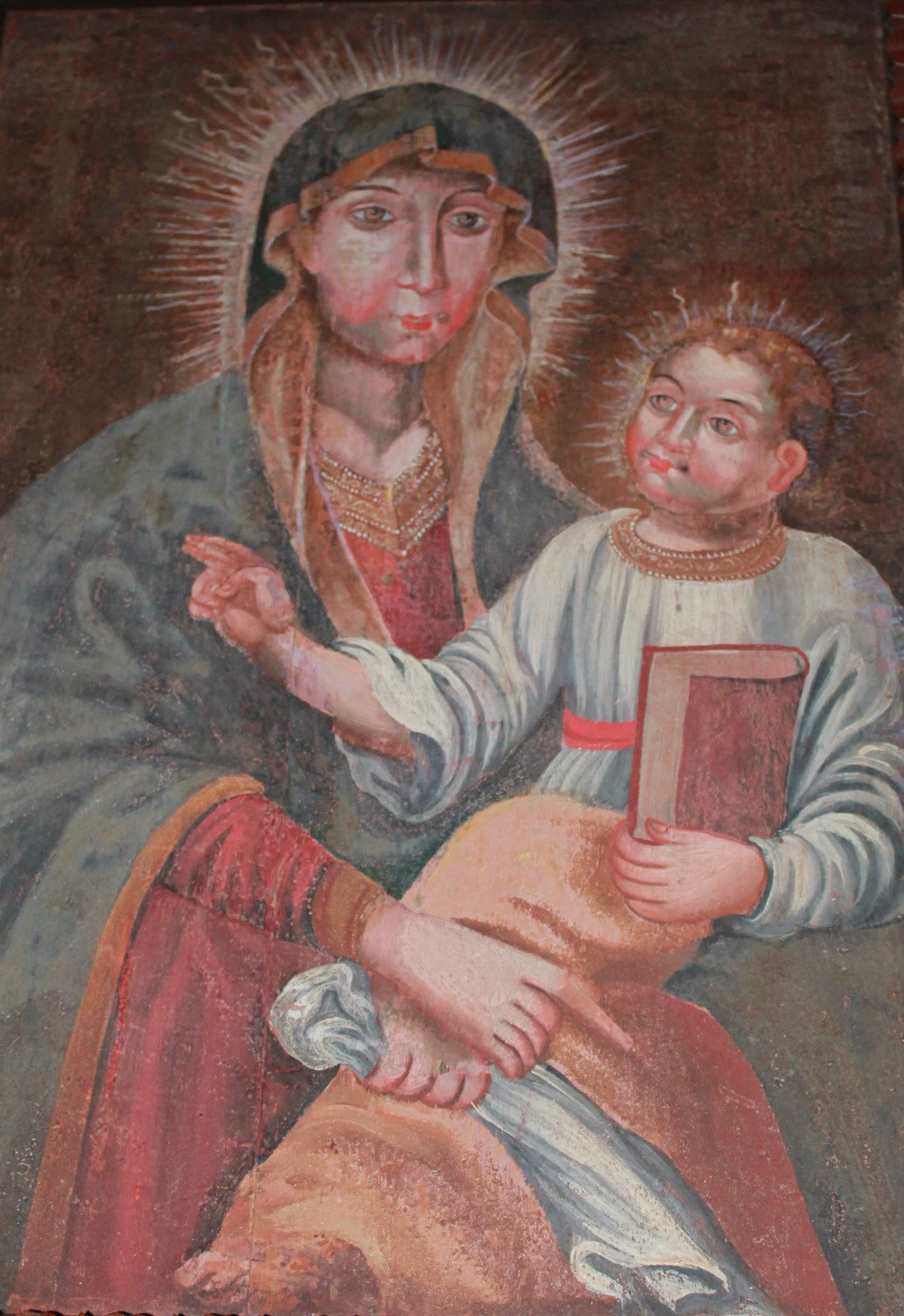
- Location: Berdychiv, Ukraine
- Date: Original: 1630; Current:1998
- Type: Wooden icon, golden crowns
- Approval: Pope Benedict XIV; Pope Pius IX; Pope John Paul II
- Shrine: Berdychiv Carmelite Monastery, Berdychiv, Ukraine

Our Lady of Berdyczow (Polish: Matka Boza Berdyczowska; Ukrainian: Бердичівська Мати Божа, romanized: Berdychivska Maty Bozha) is a 17th-century icon of the Virgin Mary, patterned after Rome’s Our Lady of the Snows. The icon, whose size was 70 x 51 centimeters, was crowned on 16 July 1756. At that time, it was kept at a Roman Catholic shrine at Berdyczow, Polish–Lithuanian Commonwealth (now: Berdychiv, Ukraine). The shrine in Berdyczhow was the most important such location of the Kiev Voivodeship, and whole Polish Ukraine (see Shrines to the Virgin Mary).

The original painting of Our Lady of Berdyczow perished in a 1941 fire. Its copy (143 x 93 cm) was made in 1991 by a painter and restorer from Kraków, Bozena Mucha-Sowinska.

== History ==
The history of the shrine dates back to 1630, when Voivode of Kiev Janusz Tyszkiewicz built a Discalced Carmelites church and a monastery, as a votum for his release from Ottoman captivity. Tyszkiewicz presented to the church the icon of Virgin Mary, kept by his family. Due to numerous wars and conflicts of the 17th century, the icon was kept at Lwów (1648-1721) and Lublin (1722-1736).

Since the Berdyczow icon was associated with several miracles, Pope Benedict XIV agreed to crown it with golden crowns. The coronation took place on 16 July 1756, and the ceremony was led by Bishop of Kiev Kajetan Soltyk. From May 28 until 14 June 1768, Polish rebels under Kazimierz Pulaski defended the monastery from Russian troops (see Bar Confederation). In 1820, when Berdyczow was part of the Russian Empire, the papal crowns were stolen. Pope Pius IX sent new ones, and the re-crowning ceremony took place on 6 June 1856, ordained by Bishop of Luck and Zytomierz, Kasper Borowski.

In 1924, Soviet authorities seized the monastery together with the church, opening here a museum and a cinema. The icon was preserved as a piece of art. In 1941, the complex, together with the icon, burned in a great fire.

Carmelite monks returned to Berdychiv in 1991. On 19 July 1997, Bishop of Kiev and Zhytomir, Jan Purwinski, blessed the copy of the original icon. The third crowning of Our Lady of Berdychiv took place on 19 July 1998.

On 27 October 2001, the church at Berdychiv was named all-Ukrainian national sanctuary.

== Sources ==
- Miejsca swiete Rzeczypospolitej. Leksykon, red. Antoni Jackowski, Znak, Kraków 1998, pp. 27–29.
- Przewodnik po sanktuariach maryjnych. Z dawna Polski tys Królowa. Koronowane wizerunki Matki Bozej 1717–1999, Szymanow 1999, pp. 79–81.
