= Onnen (surname) =

Onnen is a surname. Notable people with the surname include:

- Eike Onnen (born 1982), German high jumper
- Imke Onnen (born 1994), German high jumper
- Jakobus Onnen (1906–1943), German military officer and war criminal
- Tony Onnen (born 1938), American politician
