= Berdychiv Carmelite Monastery =

Carmelite Roman Catholic monastery in Berdychiv, Ukraine

Monastery of Discalced Carmelites
- Монастир кармелітів босих
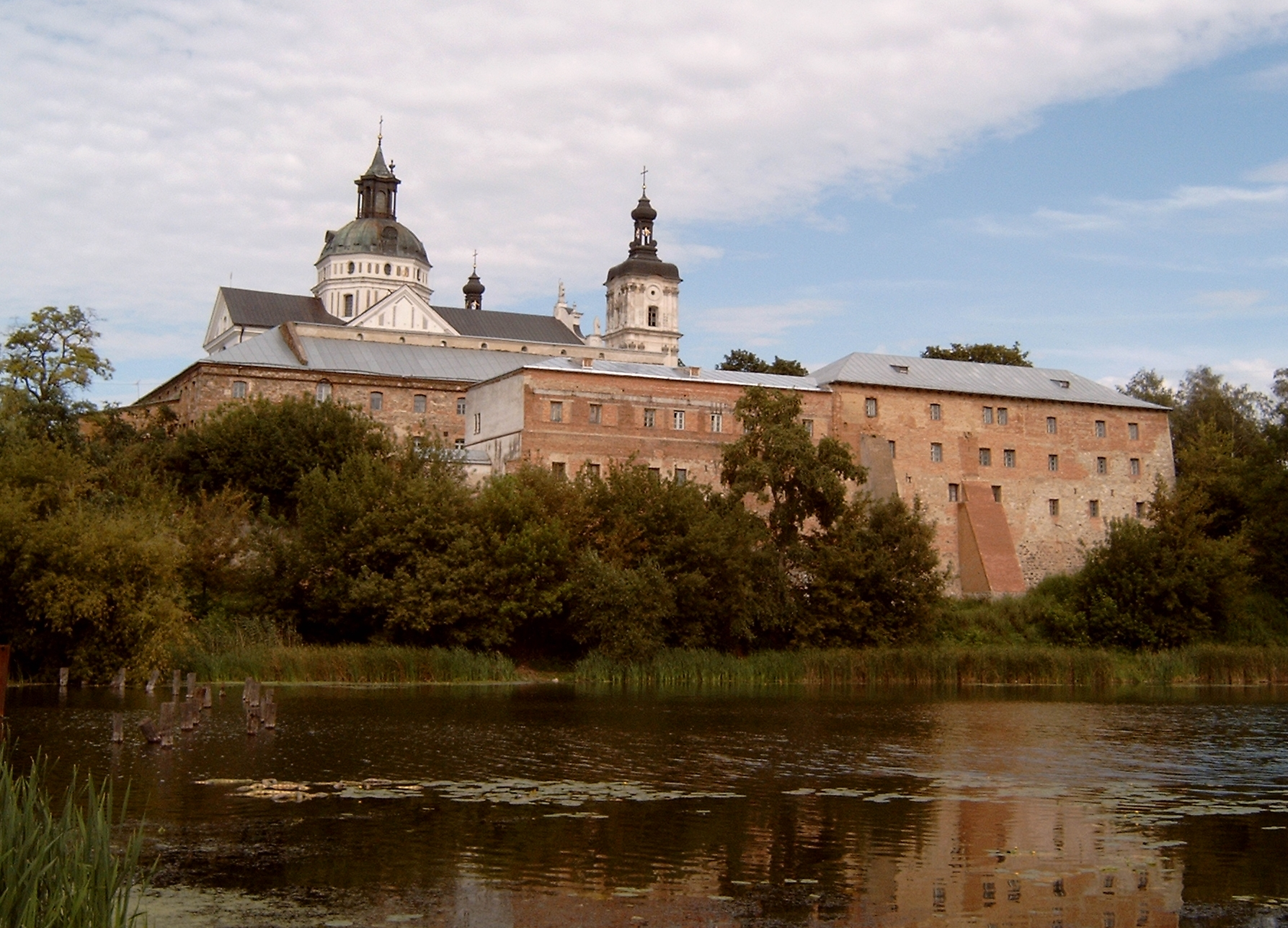

- Location within Zhytomyr Oblast Location within Ukraine

Monastery information
- Order: Discalced Carmelites
- Denomination: Latin Church
- Established: 1630
- Diocese: Roman Catholic Diocese of Kyiv-Zhytomyr

People
- Founder: Janusz Tyszkiewicz Łohojski

Architecture
- Heritage designation: 105
- Style: Baroque
- Completed date: 1842

Site
- Location: Berdychiv, Zhytomyr Oblast
- Country: Ukraine
- Coordinates: 49°53′50″N 28°34′28″E

Immovable Monument of National Significance of Ukraine
- Official name: Кармелітський монастир (Carmelite monastery)
- Type: Architecture
- Reference no.: 060025

The Berdychiv Carmelite Monastery, formally known as the Monastery of Discalced Carmelites (Ukrainian: Монастир кармелітів босих, romanized: Monastyr karmelitiv bosykh; Polish: Klasztor warowny Karmelitów Bosych) is a Discalced Carmelite monastery in the city of Berdychiv, Ukraine. The adjacent sanctuary is dedicated to the Immaculate Conception, which was elevated to the status of a basilica in 2024.

== History ==
The Berdychiv Carmelite Monastery began construction in 1634, four years after voivode of Kiev Janusz Tyszkiewicz Łohojski gave a Berdychiv fortress to the Carmelites. It eventually finished construction in 1642. The building was destroyed during the Khmelnytsky Uprising, but later rebuilt. The monastery became known for its icon, Our Lady of Berdyczow, which was given golden crowns by Pope Benedict XIV on 16 July 1756. The icon became an object of pilgrimage for Polish Catholics, and the monastery also began printing and education programmes during the 18th century.

Following the partitions of Poland, Berdychiv became part of the Russian Empire, and the monastery's printing and educational programmes were forced to close. The crowns of the icon were stolen, though it was crowned again by Pope Pius IX in 1854. The monastery was later taken over by the Russian government, and would only be restored shortly after the Russian Revolution. The monastery briefly resumed activities, but was soon taken over by the Soviet government after the only monk at the monastery died in 1926.

=== World War II ===
In 1941, shortly before Operation Barbarossa, Our Lady of Berdyczow was destroyed in a fire, along with much of the rest of the monastery.

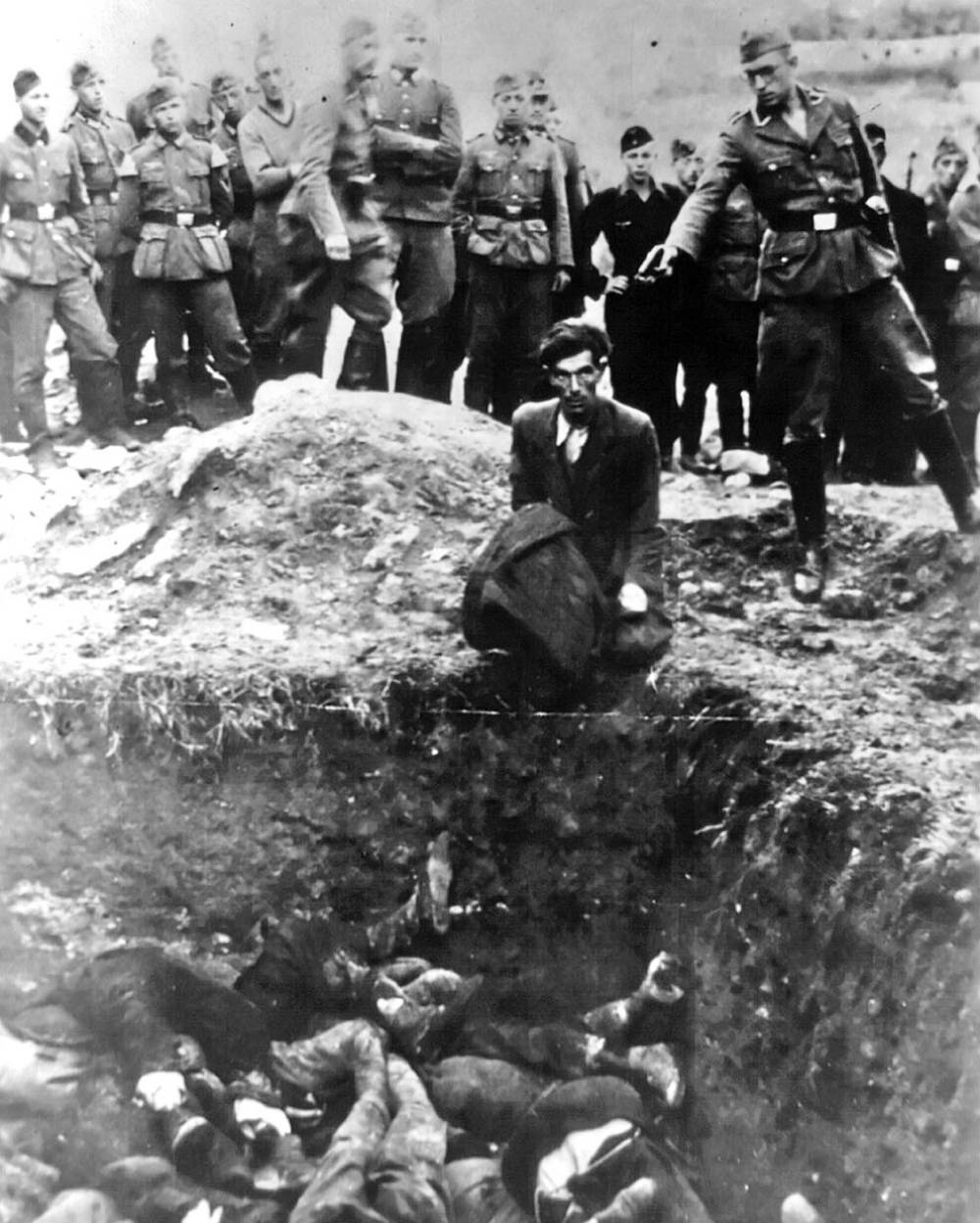
Although this photograph is often identified as The Last Jew in Vinnitsa it is now believed to show an unknown Jewish man—probably on 28 July 1941 in Berdychiv (Berditschew)—about to be shot dead by Jakobus Onnen a member of Einsatzgruppe C.

An infamous photograph from the Holocaust in Ukraine is believed by researchers to have been made at the monastery. The photo is known as The Last Jew in Vinnitsa, showing an unknown Jewish man—probably on 28 July 1941—about to be shot dead by a member of the Einsatzgruppen, a mobile death squad of the German SS. The victim is kneeling beside a mass grave already containing bodies; behind, a group of SS and Reich Labor Service men watch. Recent research has suggested that the photograph was probably taken at the abandoned Berdychiv Carmelite Monastery, which can be seen in an alternative print of the photograph, and not in Vinnytsia (Vinnitsa).

=== After World War II ===
The monastery was returned to the Roman Catholic Church in 1991, following the Declaration of Independence of Ukraine. Our Lady of Berdyczow was restored, and once again crowned by Pope John Paul II in 1998. The monastery continues to attract thousands of pilgrims yearly, both among Catholics and followers of Eastern Orthodoxy. During the Russian invasion of Ukraine, head of the Discalced Carmelites Miguel Márquez Calle celebrated Mass at the monastery.

On 25 June 2024, Pope Francis, through the Dicastery for Divine Worship and the Discipline of the Sacraments, decreed that the sanctuary will be elevated to the status of minor basilica. This was announced on 21 July in a mass presided by Cardinal Pietro Parolin.
