= Berdychiv urban hromada =

Urban hromada of Zhytomyr Oblast, Ukraine

Berdychiv urban hromada Бердичівська міська громада
- Hromada
- Location within Zhytomyr Oblast Location within Ukraine
- Coordinates: 49°54′0″N 28°34′0″E
- Country: Ukraine
- Oblast (province): Zhytomyr Oblast
- Raion (district): Berdychiv Raion

Area
  - Total: 82.4 km^{2} (31.8 sq mi)

Population (2023)
  - Total: 80,398
- Website: berdychiv.com.ua

Berdychiv urban territorial hromada (Ukrainian: Бердичівська міська територіальна громада, romanized: Berdychivska miska terytorialna hromada) is one of the hromadas of Ukraine, located within Berdychiv Raion in Zhytomyr Oblast. Its capital is the city of Berdychiv.

The hromada has an area of 82.4 km^{2} (31.8 mi^{2}), as well as a population of 80,398 (as of 2023).

== Composition ==
In addition to one city (Berdychiv), the hromada contains two villages: Pidhorodne and Skrahlivka.
