= The Last Jew in Vinnitsa =

1941 photograph from the Holocaust

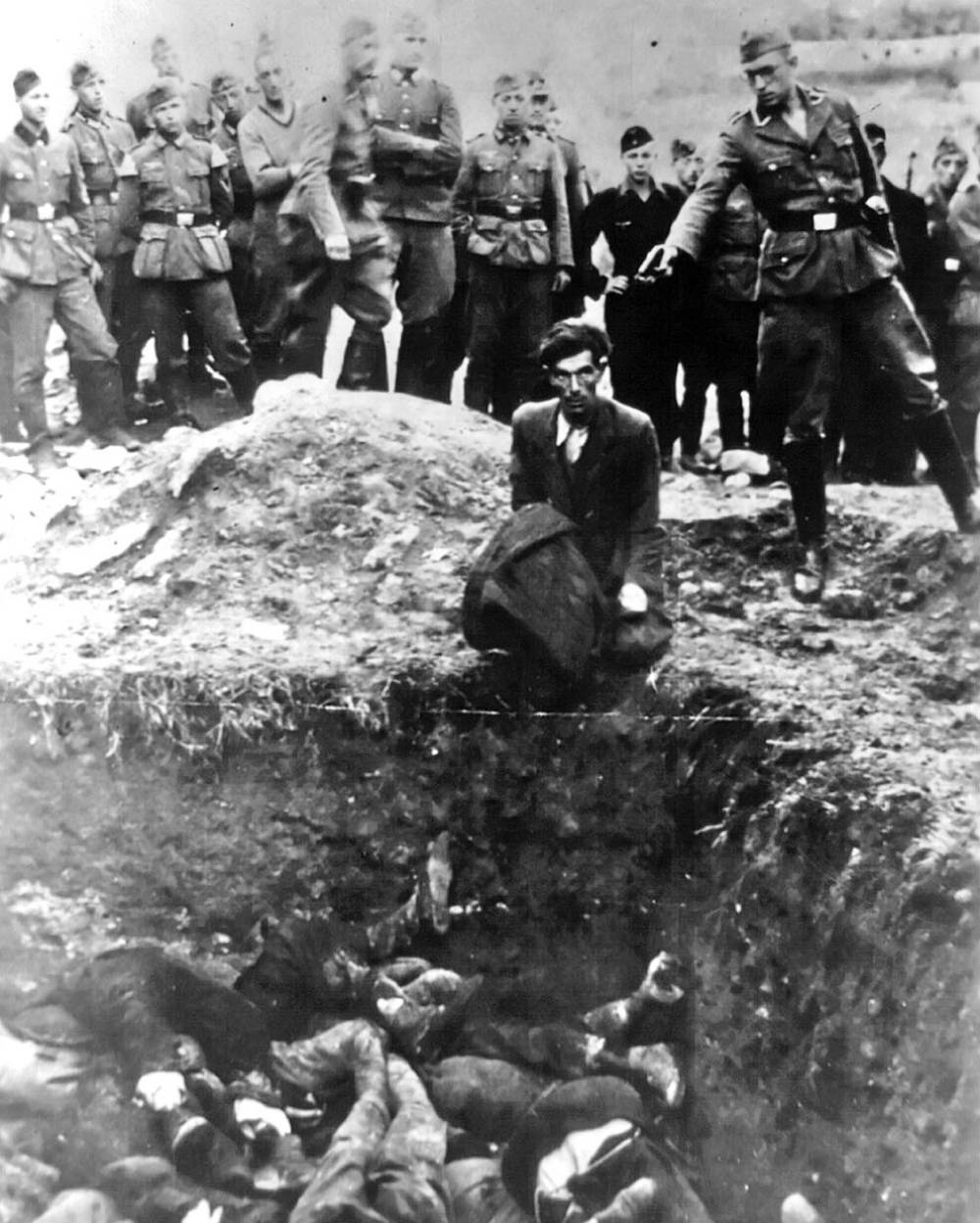
The Last Jew in Vinnitsa

The Last Jew in Vinnitsa is a photograph taken during the Holocaust in Ukraine showing an unknown Jewish man—probably on 28 July 1941 in Berdychiv (not Vinnitsa)—about to be shot dead by Jakobus Onnen, a member of Einsatzgruppe C, a mobile death squad of the German SS. The victim is kneeling beside a mass grave already containing bodies; behind, a group of SS and Reich Labor Service men watch indifferently.

== History ==
The photograph was circulated in 1961 by United Press (UPI) during the trial of Adolf Eichmann. UPI had received it from Al Moss (b. 1910), a Polish Jew who acquired it in May 1945 shortly after he was liberated from Allach concentration camp by the American 3rd Army. Moss, living in Chicago in 1961, wanted people "to know what went on in Eichmann's time". The UPI copy was published over a full page of The Forward.

=== Early accounts ===
Multiple wartime prints of the image exist. Later sources give various accounts of their provenance. Some say that the original physical image was in an Einsatzgruppe member's photograph album, or removed from the pocket of a dead soldier; and that written on its reverse side was "Last Jew in Vinnitsa", now widely used as the image's name. Several people have contacted Die Welt, each purporting to identify the shooter as a relative. The Germans' summer uniforms mean the photograph is unlikely to have been taken in winter.

If it was taken in Vinnytsia, the photograph would date from some time between mid-1941, when the Germans and Romanians occupied the oblast (province) of Vinnytsia, and 1943. During this period, there were numerous massacres of Jews in the oblast, including in the town itself on 16 and 22 September 1941 and April 1942, after which those spared were sent to labour camps and Yerusalimka, Vinnitsa's Jewish quarter, was largely razed.

=== 2020s developments ===
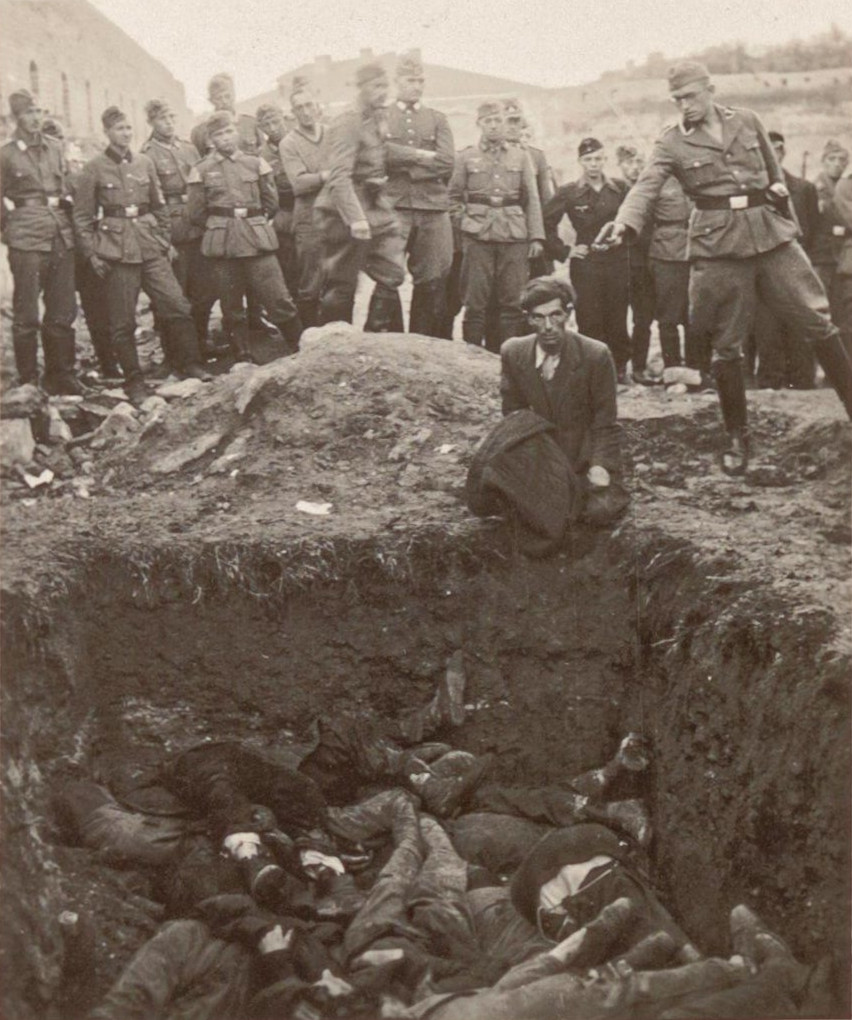
The alternative print allowed the identification of the shooter and the exact location where the picture was taken. Note that buildings in the background are visible which are obscured in the original print.

In 2023, Jürgen Matthäus of the United States Holocaust Memorial Museum discussed the image in an article in the journal Holocaust and Genocide Studies, based on an alternative print from the same negative found in the diary of Walter Materna, an Austrian captain in a Wehrmacht pioneer unit attached to Army Group South, then deployed to the Ukrainian city of Berdychiv, about 90 kilometres (56 mi) north of Vinnytsia in Zhytomyr Oblast. This print has the handwritten caption "Late July 1941. Execution of Jews by SS in the Berditschew citadel" on its reverse. The print has finer detail and the uncropped image includes a number of additional soldiers to the left, and a building in the background. Matthäus' article reproduces another photograph, possibly of the same event from a different angle, published by the Archive of Modern Conflict in an album of Wehrmacht sergeant Heinz Baier, which also mentions Berdychiv. Materna's diary for 28 July 1941 in Berdychiv tells of hearing from other Germans at the citadel that about 70 Jews were shot that day (and one "Aryan", a trainee political commissar) after 180 and 300 killed on the previous two days. After the victims were shot and fell into the mass grave, another SS-man machine-gunned them to ensure death.

In September 2025, Matthäus claimed that analysis of the buildings in the image confirmed the location as the Berdychiv citadel (now Berdychiv Carmelite Monastery, 49°53′52.6″N 28°34′27.2″E) and that facial recognition software had identified the shooter "with more than 99 percent certainty" as Jakobus Onnen (1906–1943), a teacher from Tichelwarf near Weener in East Frisia who had been a member of the SS since 1934 and was later killed in action near Zhitomir in 1943. Volunteers from the investigative journalism group Bellingcat helped Matthäus to geolocate the image. They were the first to identify the location depicted in the photograph. The photographer and victim remain unidentified.

== Significance ==
The photograph has become iconic. Matthäus says, "The number of extant copies indicate that the image was popular with Germans stationed in or transitioning through Berdychiv." Some features are unusual among well-known Holocaust pictures: it was taken during the Holocaust rather than after its end, and presumably by someone complicit in the killing; it depicts Einsatzgruppen rather than concentration or extermination camps; the focus is on a solitary victim rather than a multitude. The photograph has been reproduced, with different degrees of cropping, in many books and museum exhibits about the Holocaust. Books include ones by Guido Knopp and Michael Berenbaum. Exhibits include in Berlin at "Questions on German History" in the Reichstag building from 1971 to 1994, and then at Topography of Terror and the Memorial to the Murdered Jews of Europe; the Institute of National Remembrance in Poland; the United States Holocaust Memorial Museum; and Yad Vashem.

The photograph was used on the cover of Agnostic Front's 1984 album Victim in Pain, liable to be interpreted as part of the Nazi chic then current in the New York hardcore scene. Roger Miret later said his thinking had been "this needs to be publicized in order to prevent history from repeating itself."

== See also ==
- Photography of the Holocaust
- List of photographs considered the most important
