= Berdychiv =

City in Zhytomyr Oblast, Ukraine

Berdychiv Бердичів
- City
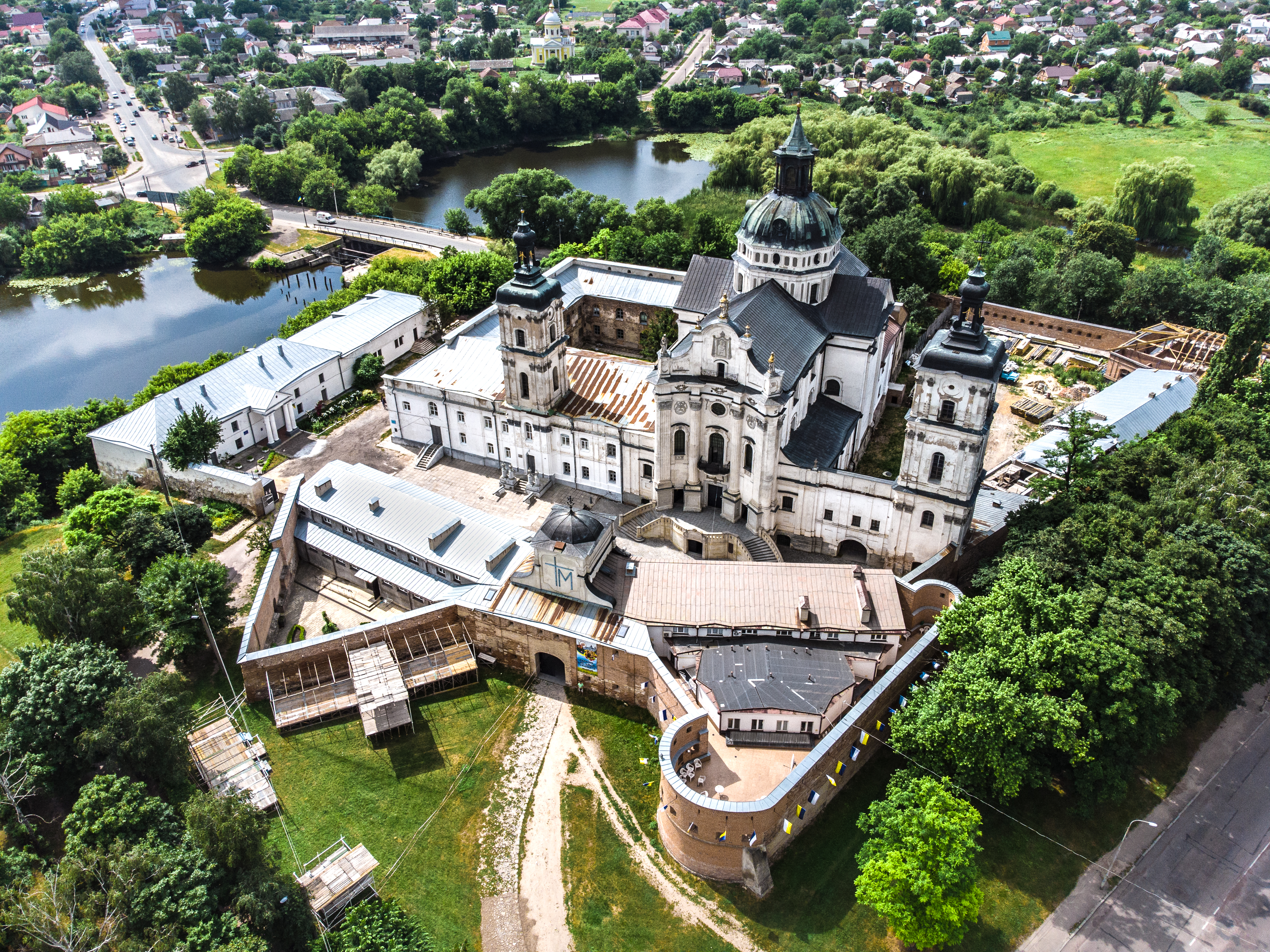
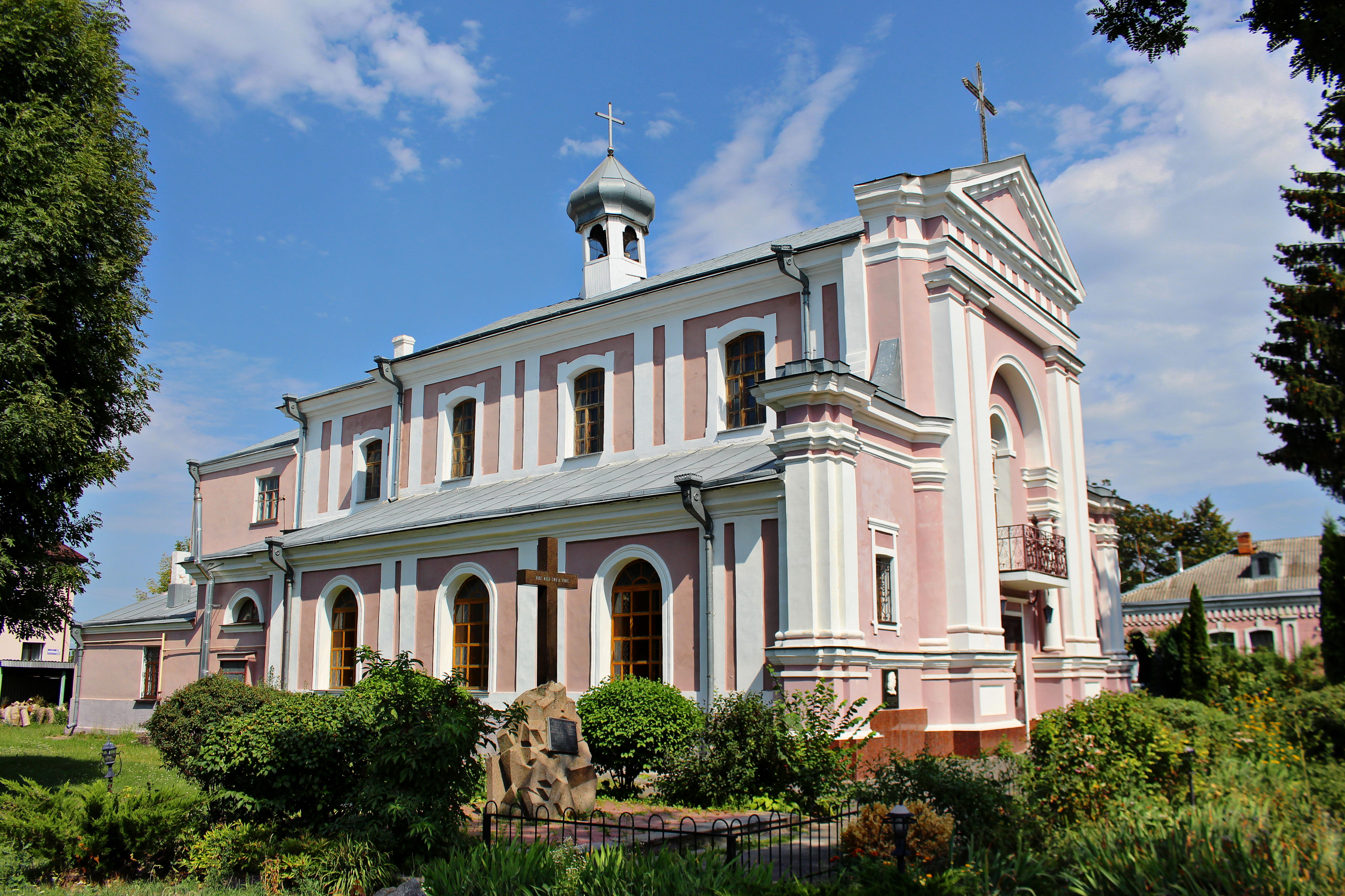
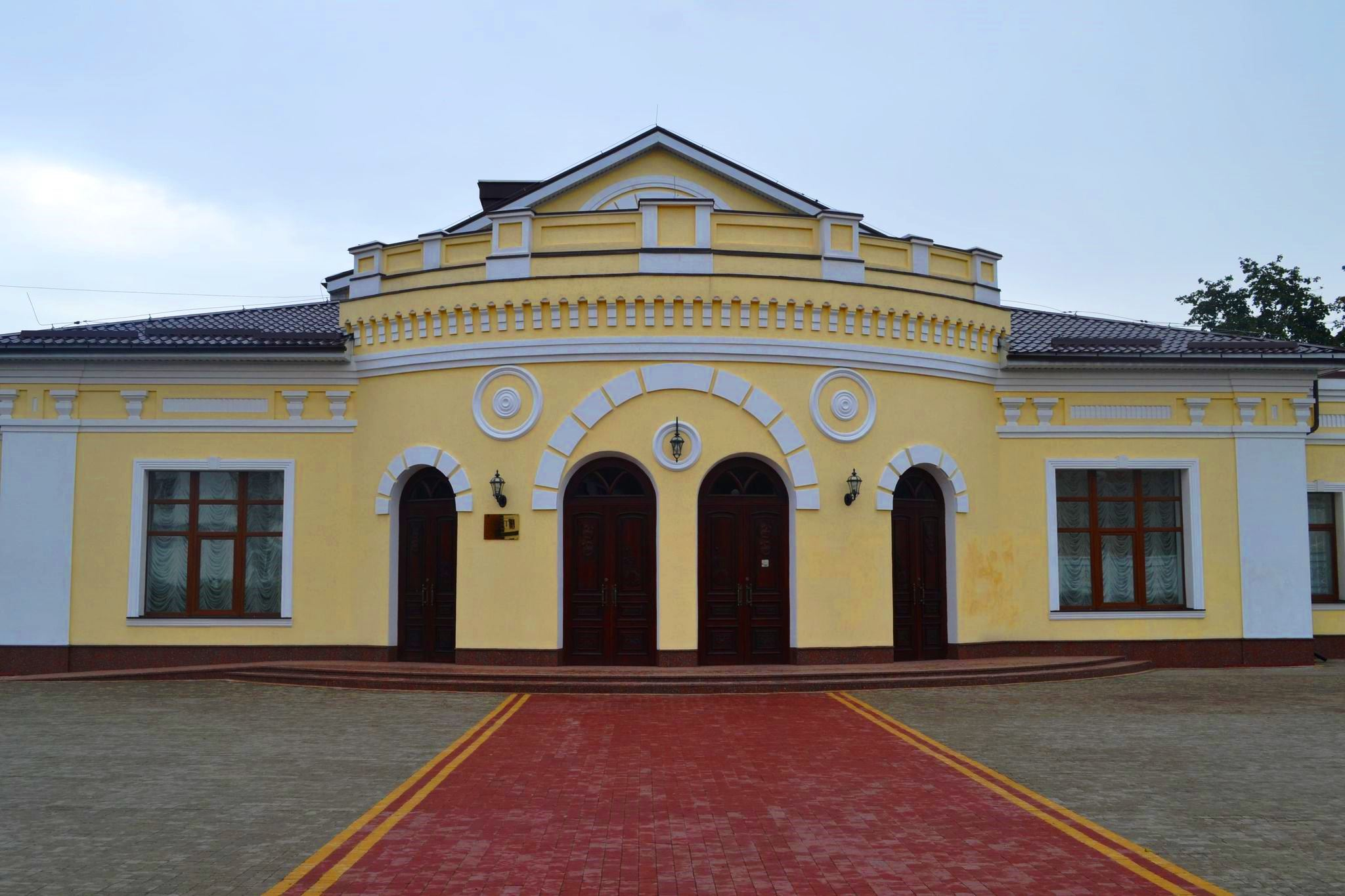
- Carmelite Monastery St. Barbara's Church District House of Culture

- Flag Coat of arms
- Interactive map of Berdychiv
- Location of Berdychiv Berdychiv (Ukraine)
- Coordinates: 49°54′0″N 28°34′0″E
- Country: Ukraine
- Oblast: Zhytomyr Oblast
- Raion: Berdychiv Raion
- Hromada: Berdychiv urban hromada
- Founded: 1430

Government
  - Head of City Council: Kolyada Bohdan Oleksandrovych (acting)

Population (2022)
  - Total: ▲73,046
- Website: berdychiv.com.ua

Berdychiv (Ukrainian: Берди́чів, IPA: [berˈdɪtʃiu̯]; Russian: Берди́чев; Polish: Berdyczów; Yiddish: בערדיטשעוו) is a historic city in Zhytomyr Oblast, northern Ukraine. It serves as the administrative center of Berdychiv Raion within the oblast. It is 44 km (27 mi) south of the administrative center of the oblast, Zhytomyr. Its population is approximately 73,046 (2022 estimate).

The area has seen various cultural influences and political changes over time, from its early settlement by the Chernyakhov culture to its position within the Polish-Lithuanian Commonwealth and later, the Russian Empire. Berdychiv was an important trading and banking center in its heyday, but the town became impoverished after the banking industry moved to Odesa in the mid-19th century. Berdychiv was also a significant center of Jewish history, with a large Jewish population and an important role in the development of Hasidism. However, during World War II, the Nazis and their collaborators brutally massacred tens of thousands of Jews in Berdychiv. Before the Holocaust, about 80 percent of the town’s population was Jewish.

The city has seen continued conflict, with damage sustained during the Russian invasion of Ukraine beginning in 2022.

== Name ==
In addition to the Ukrainian Бердичів (Berdychiv), in other languages the name of the city is Polish: Berdyczów, Yiddish: באַרדיטשעװ, romanized: Barditshev and Russian: Берди́чев, romanized: Berdichev.

== History ==
=== Early history ===
The territory on which the city is located was inhabited as early as the 2nd millennium BC. Bronze Age settlements and the remains of two settlements of the Chernyakhov culture were discovered here.

In 1430, Grand Duke of Lithuania Vytautas (великий князь литовський Вітовт) granted the rights over the area to Kalinik, the procurator (намісник) of Putyvl and Zvenyhorodka, and it is believed that his servant named Berdich founded a khutor (remote settlement) there. However the etymology of the name Berdychiv is not known.

In 1483, Crimean Tatars destroyed the settlement. In 1545, Berdyczów was mentioned as a property of the Polish-Lithuanian magnate Tyszkiewicz family, and in a 1546 document settling the border between Poland and Lithuania within the Polish–Lithuanian union.

=== Polish rule ===
According to the Union of Lublin (1569), Berdyczów passed to Poland within the Polish–Lithuanian Commonwealth. It was granted city rights in 1593 and was a private town, administratively located in the Żytomierz County in the Kijów Voivodeship in the Lesser Poland Province.

The fortified Carmelite monastery was built from 1627 to 1642 with funding from Janusz Tyszkiewicz Łohojski. In 1643, Bishop Andrzej Szołdrski laid the foundation stone of the Church of the Immaculate Conception, Saint Michael Archangel and Saint John the Baptist. Berdyczów became a Catholic pilgrimage destination and an important defensive fortress on the eastern flank of Western Christian civilization.

The monastery was captured and plundered by Bohdan Khmelnytsky in 1647.

In 1687, Teresa Tyszkiewicz married Krzysztof Stanisław Zawisza, and Berdyczów passed to the Zawisza family of Łabędź coat of arms. Krzysztof Stanisław Zawisza erected a new manor house in the city.

Following the suppression of Paliy uprising, hetman Ivan Mazepa imprisoned its leader Semen Paliy in the underground crypt of Berdychiv's Carmelite Monastery.

After the death of Krzysztof Stanisław Zawisza in 1721, the town passed to his daughter Barbara Franciszka, wife of Prince Mikołaj Faustyn Radziwiłł, thus passing to the Radziwiłł family. Berdyczów flourished during the rule of Kings Augustus III of Poland and Stanisław August Poniatowski. In 1760 a printing house was founded at the monastery, which in 1777 printed the oldest Polish encyclopedia for children.

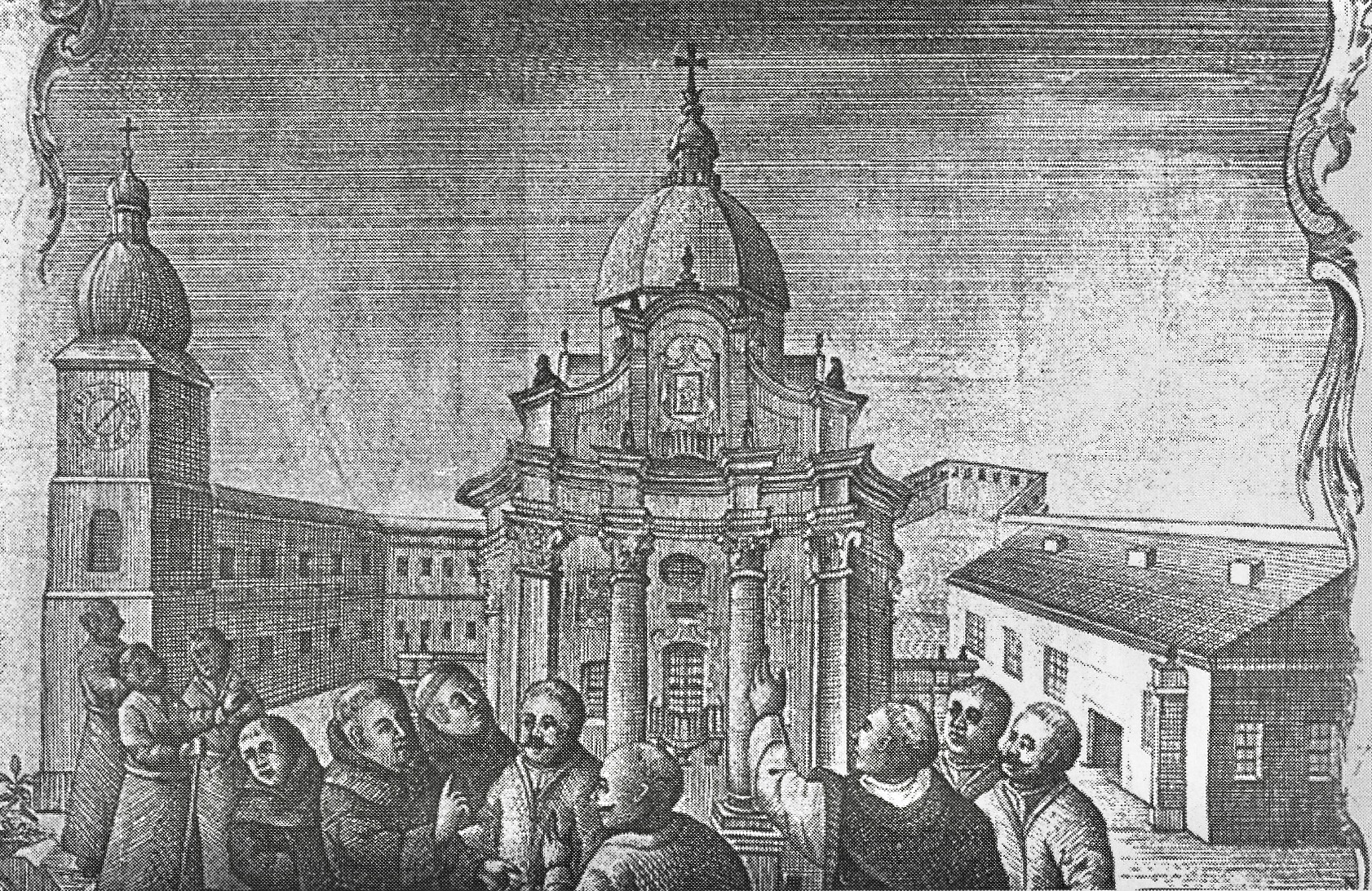
18th-century view of the Carmelite monastery (by Teodor Rakowiecki)

In 1768, Kazimierz Pulaski defended the city with his 700 men surrounded by royal army during Bar Confederation.

The town underwent rapid development after king Stanisław August Poniatowski, under pressure from the powerful Radziwiłł family, granted it the unusual right to organize ten fairs a year. This made Berdychiv one of the most important trading and banking centers in the Polish–Lithuanian Commonwealth, and later, the Russian Empire. At the time, the saying "Pisz na Berdyczów!" ('Send letters to Berdychiv!') had an idiomatic meaning; because merchants from all over Poland, Lithuania, Ukraine and the rest of eastern and central Europe were sure to visit the town within two or three months of each other, it became a central poste restante (post office box) of the region. Later, because of the phrase being used in a popular poem by Juliusz Słowacki, "Pisz na Berdyczów!" acquired a second meaning as a brush-off; "send me a letter to nowhere" or "leave me alone".

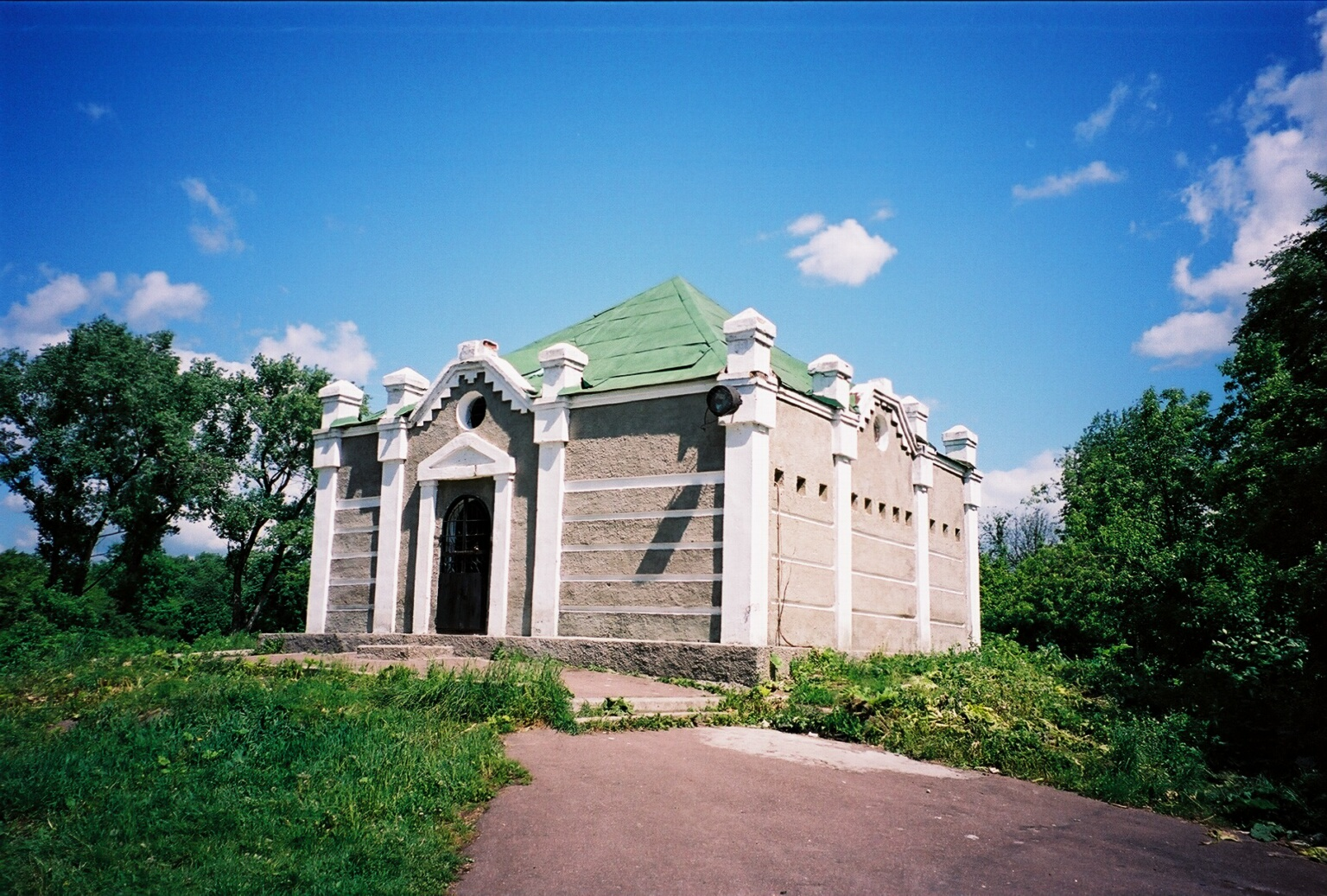
Ohel (tomb-prayer house) Levi Yitzchok of Berditchev

According to the census of 1789, Jews constituted 75% of Berdychiv's population. In 1797, Prince Radziwill granted seven Jewish families the monopoly privilege of the cloth trade in the town. By the end of the 18th century, Berdychiv became an important center of Hasidism. As the town grew, a number of noted scholars served as rabbis there, including Lieber the Great, Joseph the Harif and the Tzadik Levi Yitzchok of Berditchev (the author of Kedushat Levi), who lived and taught there until his death in 1809. (Note: See Berditchev (Hasidic dynasty)) Berdychiv was also one of the centers of the conflict between Hasidim and Mitnagdim.

=== In the Russian Empire ===
In 1793, after the Second Partition of Poland and the annexation of Right-Bank Ukraine to the Russian Empire, Berdychiv became part of the Volyn Province as a town of Zhitomirsky Uyezd. In 1798, it had 864 houses and 4820 people. The town was the administrative centre of the Berdichevsky Uyezd, a part of the Kyiv Governorate (1796–1925).

Trade began to decline since 1798, however it revived during the Napoleonic Wars in 1812–1814. Jews were a major driving force of the town's commerce in the first half of the 19th century, founding a number of trading companies (some traded internationally) and banking establishments, and serving as agents of the neighboring estates of Polish nobility (szlachta). As the ideas of Haskalah influenced parts of the Jewish communities, a large group of Maskilim formed in Berdychiv in the 1820s. In 1847, 23,160 Jews resided in Berdychiv and by 1861 the number doubled to 46,683. Berdychiv became the city with the largest share of Jewish population in Ukraine and the Russian Empire. The May Laws of 1882 and other government persecutions affected Jewish population and in 1897, out of the town's population of 53,728, 41,617 (about 80%) were Jewish. 58% of Jewish males and 32% of Jewish females were literate.

In 1840 the Carmelite printing house was moved to Zhytomyr. In 1831 local schools were closed down by Tsarist authorities as punishment for the unsuccessful Polish November Uprising, and in 1864 the Carmelite monastery was dissolved as punishment for the January Uprising. In 1837, the Związek Ludu Polskiego Polish resistance organization was founded in the city. The banking industry was moved from Berdychiv to Odesa (a major port city) after 1850, and the town became impoverished again in a short period of time.

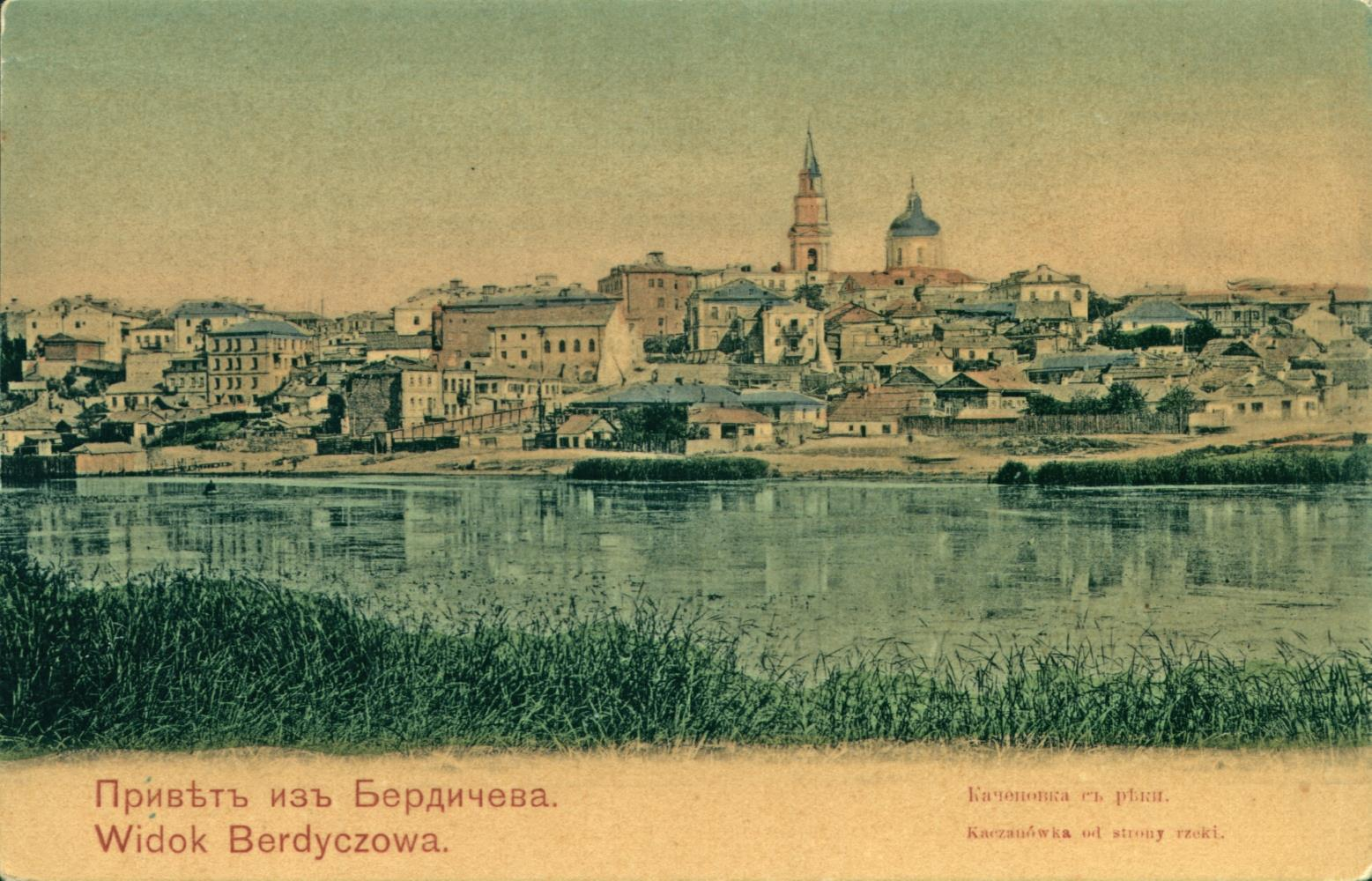
Early 20th-century view of the city

Until the mid-19th century, Berdychiv was one of the biggest cities in Ukraine as centre of grain and cattle trade and small-scale industry, such as mercery and shoemaking. In 1846, the town had 1893 buildings, 69 of which were brick-made, 11 streets, 80 alleys, and four squares. Honoré de Balzac visited it in 1850 and noted that its unplanned development made it resemble the dance of a polka as some buildings leaned left while others leaned right. In 1857, Polish-British writer Joseph Conrad, regarded as one of the greatest novelists to write in the English language, was born in Berdychiv.

During the second half of the 19th century Berdychiv's population stagnated due to the decline of fairs and emergence of railways. Around the turn of the 20th century, Berdychiv counted some 80 synagogues and batei midrash, and was famous for its cantors.

=== World War I and interwar period ===
By World War I, the city's population had reached around 100,000, but the natural growth was balanced by the emigration. After the February Revolution, during the Russian Civil War and Ukrainian War of Independence, in 1918–19, Berdychiv's mayor and chairman of its Jewish community was the Bundist leader David Petrovsky (Lipetz). As mayor he managed to prevent a planned multi-day pogrom in Berdychiv by haidamaks from the Kuren Smerti (Clan of Death), thus saving thousands of lives.

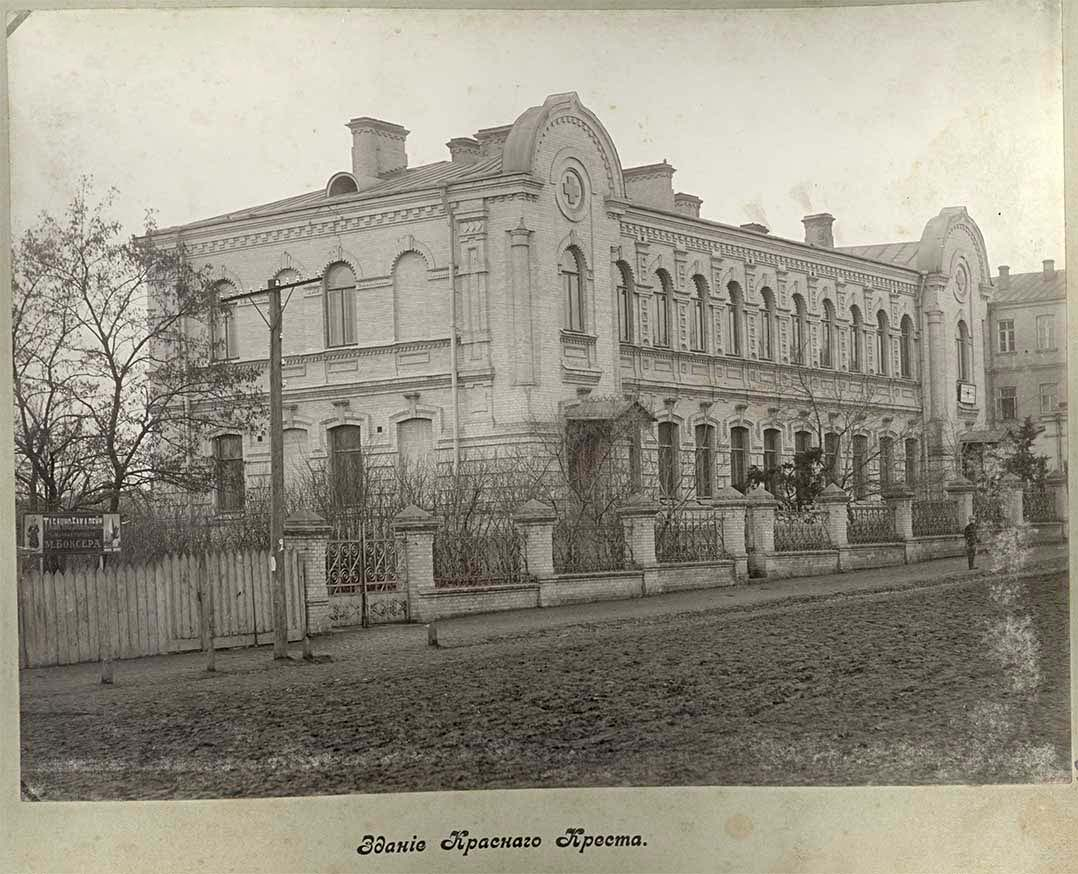
Former Red Cross Hospital

After the fall of Tsarist Russia, the town was under control of the newly formed Ukrainian People's Republic from 1917 to 1919. In early 1918 German troops passed through the city along with Ukrainian forces, including Sich Riflemen, and defeated the Bolsheviks. After a short period of time under the rule of Ukrainian State in 1918, Berdychiv eventually fell to the Communists and was included within Soviet Ukraine in October 1919. On 26 April 1920, it was the site of a battle in which Poles defeated the Soviets and liberated the city during the Kyiv offensive and Polish–Soviet War. Polish troops also liberated dozens of Polish hostages, who were brought by the Soviets to the town from Zhytomyr. After another battle, on 7 June 1920, it was lost by the Poles to the Russian 1st Cavalry Army, which then carried out a massacre of hundreds of wounded Polish and Ukrainian soldiers plus Red Cross workers and nuns, who were burned alive in the local hospital.

In the 1920s, the Yiddish language was officially recognized and, beginning in 1924, the city had a Ukrainian court of law that conducted its affairs in Yiddish. In 1923, Berdychiv became the center of the district and district of the same name, and in 1937 it entered the Zhytomyr region.

By 1926 Jews comprised 55% of Berdychiv's population. The Soviet authorities closed most of the town's synagogues by the 1930s. All remaining Jewish cultural and educational institutions were suspended in the second half of the 1930s, before the beginning of World War II.

The city suffered from the man-made famine Holodomor of 1932-1933. In 2008, the National Museum of the Holodomor Genocide published the National Book of Memory of the Victims of the Holodomor of 1932-1933 in Ukraine. Zhytomyr region. The book has 1116 pages and consists of three sections. According to historical records, more than 2,490 people died during Holodomor in 1932-1933.

In 1936, part of the Polish population was expelled by the Soviets to Kazakhstan. By 1939 Berdychiv's population consisted of 66,000 inhabitants.

=== World War II and the Holocaust ===
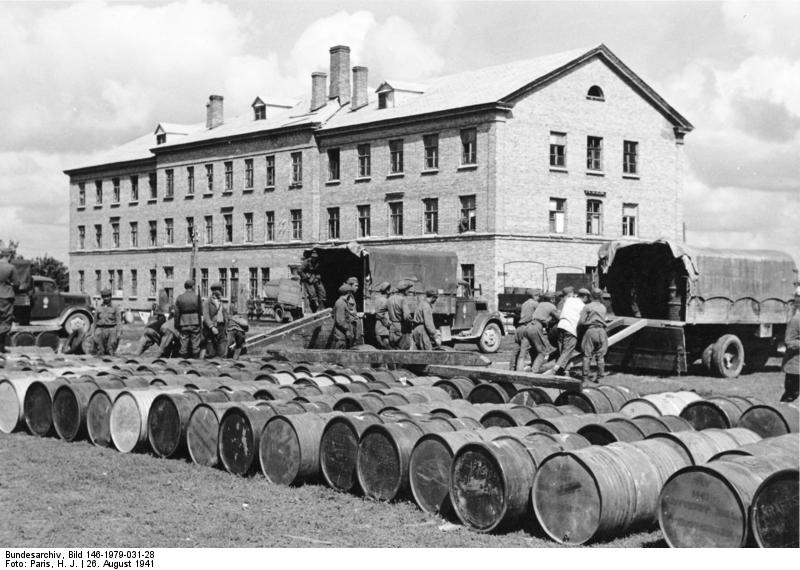
German occupation in 1941

Most civilians from areas near the border did not have a chance to evacuate when the Nazis began their invasion on 22 June 1941. Berdychiv was occupied by the German Army from 7 July 1941 to 5 January 1944. An extermination German SS unit was established in Berdychiv in early July 1941 and a Jewish ghetto was set up. It was stated in one of the Einsatzgruppen reports that on "Sept. 1, and 2, 1941, leaflets and inflammatory pamphlets were distributed by Jews in Berdychiv. As the perpetrators could not be found, 1,303 Jews, among them 875 Jewesses over 12 years, were executed by a unit of the Higher SS and Police Leaders". The ghetto was liquidated on 5 October 1941, when all the inhabitants were murdered. Eyewitnesses stated that Ukrainian auxiliary police aided the 25-member shooting squad in corralling Jews into the ghetto, policing it, and killing those who attempted to escape. One witness to a mass killing of Jews in Berdychiv said, "They had to wear their festivity-dresses. Then their clothes and valuables were taken. The pits were dug and filled in by war prisoners who were executed shortly after."

According to figures from the Soviet Extraordinary State Commission, a total of 10,656 individuals had been murdered here by the end of 1943.

The Nazis likely killed 20,000 to 30,000 Jews in Berdychiv, but a 1973 Ukrainian-language article about the history of Berdychiv says, "The Gestapo killed 38,536 people." (Ukrainian: "Гестапівці стратили 38 536 чоловік.")

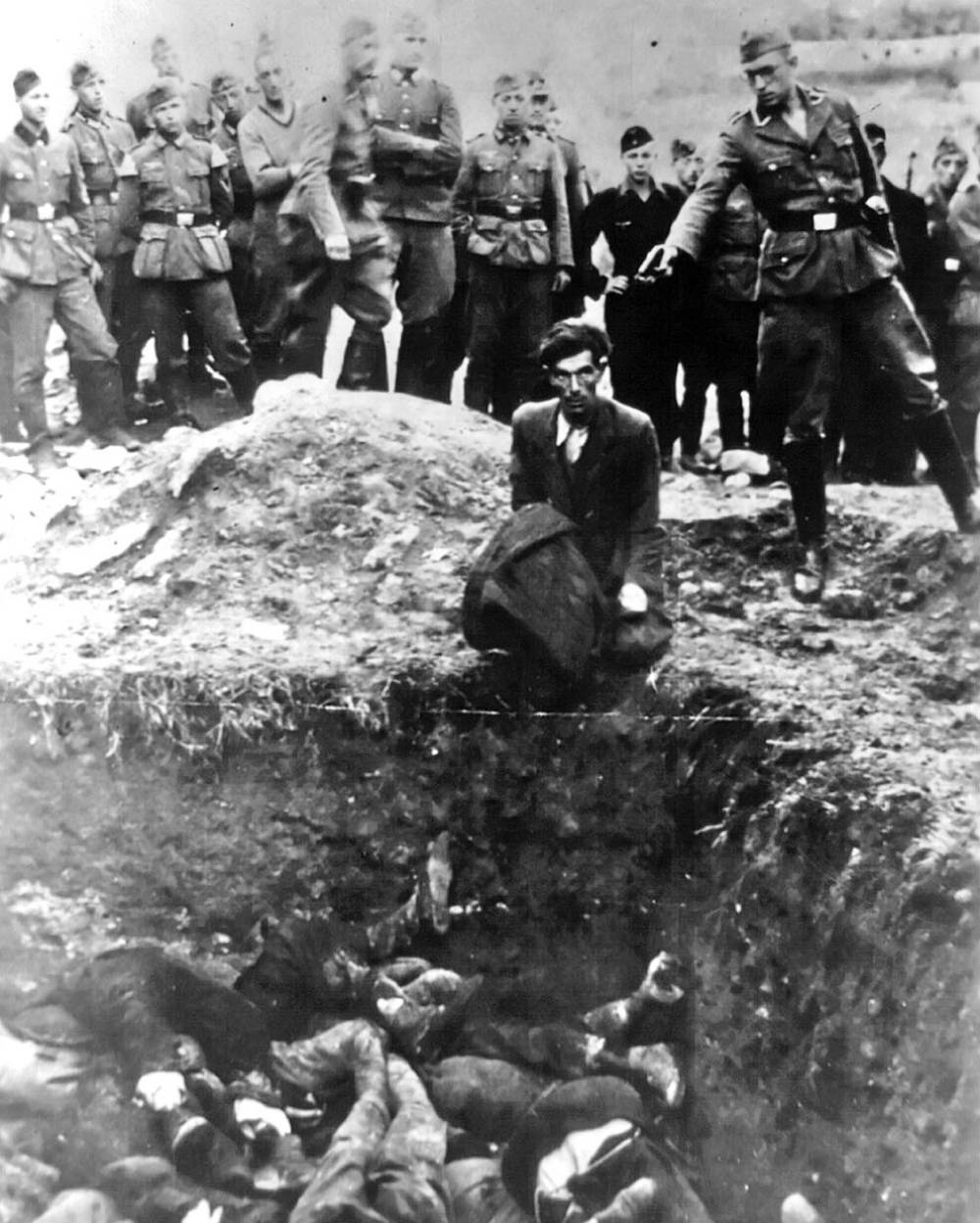
Although this photograph is often identified as The Last Jew in Vinnitsa it is now believed to show an unknown Jewish man—probably on 28 July 1941 in Berdychiv—about to be shot dead by Jakobus Onnen, a member of Einsatzgruppe C.

The Germans operated a Nazi prison, a forced labour camp, a Jewish forced labour battalion and temporarily the Stalag 339 prisoner-of-war camp in the town.

An infamous photograph from the Holocaust in Ukraine is believed by researchers to have been made at Berdychiv. The photo is known as The Last Jew in Vinnitsa, showing an unknown Jewish man—probably on 28 July 1941—about to be shot dead by a member of the Einsatzgruppen, a mobile death squad of the German SS. The victim is kneeling beside a mass grave already containing bodies; behind, a group of SS and Reich Labor Service men watch. Recent research has suggested that the photograph was probably taken at the abandoned Berdychiv Carmelite Monastery, which can be seen in an alternative print of the photograph, and not in Vinnytsia.

Berdychiv was the hometown of Soviet novelist Vasily Grossman, who worked as a war correspondent. Grossman's mother was murdered in the massacre. He wrote a detailed description of the events for publication in The Black Book, edited by Grossman and Ilya Ehrenburg, which dealt with the German treatment of Soviet Jews in the Holocaust. Originally meant for publication in the Soviet Union, it was banned there; one volume was eventually published in Bucharest in 1947. The original manuscript is in the archive of Yad Vashem, Jerusalem. A detailed account of the massacre as told by the narrator's mother appears in a fictionalized context in Grossman's novel Life and Fate, which is widely available in an English translation by Robert Chandler.

=== Postwar era ===
Under the Soviet rule Berdychiv developed as a centre of sugar industry, machine building and light industry, and served as an important railway hub. Several establishments of higher education were active, as well as a theatre and a historical museum. The territory of the Carmelite Monastery was transformed into a historical reserve.

=== 21st century ===
==== Russia invasion of Ukraine ====
During the Russian invasion of Ukraine that began in 2022, on 16 March 2022, Berdychiv was damaged by Russian air strikes. A few buildings were torn down.

== Demographics ==
Year	Total population	Jewish population
1789	2,640	1,951 (75%)
1847	?	23,160
1861	?	46,683
1867	52,563	41,617 (80%)
1926	55,417	30,812 (55.6%)
1941	?	0
1946	?	6,000
1972	77,000	15,000 (est)
1989	92,000	?
2001	88,000	1000

=== Ethnicity ===
Distribution of the population by ethnicity according to the 2001 Ukrainian census:

Ethnic groups in Berdychiv
	percent
Ukrainians	84.83%
Russians	8.74%
Poles	4.73%
Jews	0.46%
Belarusians	0.43%
Moldovans	0.10%
Gypsies	0.10%
Armenians	0.09%
Germans	0.08%

=== Language ===
Distribution of the population by native language according to the 2001 census:

Language	Percentage
Ukrainian	88.96%
Russian	10.59%
other/undecided	0.45%

== Notable people ==
Alphabetically by surname. Pseudonyms treated as one word.

- Honoré de Balzac (1799–1850), French novelist and playwright, married in Berdychiv
- Joseph Conrad (1857–1924), Polish and British writer
- John Demjanjuk (born Ivan Mykolaiovych Demjanjuk; 1920–2012), Ukrainian-American accused of war crimes and crimes against humanity carried out while serving as a guard at Nazi extermination camps during World War II
- Der Nister, pen name of Pinchus Kahanovich (1884–1950), Yiddish author, philosopher, translator, and critic
- Charles Joachim Ephrussi, the patriarch of the Ephrussi family grain dynasty
- Lipa Feingold (1878–1945), American jeweler and composer
- Abraham Firkovich, Karaite hakham
- Polina Gelman, member of the Night Witches
- Abraham Goldfaden (1840–1908), considered the father of the Jewish modern theatre
- Israel Grodner (c. 1848 – 1887), one of the founding performers in Yiddish theater
- Vasily Grossman (1905–1964), Soviet Russian writer and journalist
- Hessye Halperin, mother of actor Jacob Pavlovich Adler (1855–1926)
- Felix Lembersky, fine arts, painter (1913–1970), born and raised in Berdychiv, worked as theater stage designer
- Osip Mikhailovich Lerner (Y. Y. Lerner), writer, critic, and folklorist
- Raquel Liberman (1900–35), Jewish-Polish victim of human trafficking who broke up the notorious Zwi Migdal forced-prostitution ring in Argentina.
- Viacheslav Mishchenko (born 1964), Ukrainian photo artist and painter
- Mendele Mocher Sforim, pen name of Sholem Yankev Abramovich, Jewish author and one of the founders of modern Yiddish and Hebrew literature
- Vsevolod Nestayko (1930–2014), Ukrainian children's writer
- Pedotser, whose real name was A.M. Kholodenko (1828-1902), a Klezmer violin virtuoso
- David Petrovsky (1886–1937) — the mayor of the city and the chairman of the Jewish community of Berdychiv in 1918–1919, a member of the Central Committee of the General Jewish Labour Bund in Lithuania, Poland and Russia, a member of the Central Committee of the Jewish Socialist Federation and the Socialist Party of America, the editor of the Jewish Daily Forward newspaper in New York, journalist, political and economic scientist, the statesman of the Soviet Union.
- Antoni Protazy Potocki, szlachta (owned and organized several factories in the village of Makhnivka, near Berdychiv)
- Anatoliy Puzach (1941–2006), Soviet football player and Ukrainian coach
- Sholem Aleichem, pen name of Solomon Naumovich Rabinovich (1859–1916), leading Yiddish author and playwright, lived here doing research for his novels in the 1880s
- Boris Sidis (1867–1923), Ukrainian American psychologist, physician, psychiatrist, and philosopher of education
- Valeriy Skvortsov (1945–) Soviet high jumper; European champion
- Stempenyu, stage name of Iosef Druker (1822–79), a klezmer violin virtuoso and bandleader
- Dmytro Tymchuk (1972–2019) Ukrainian Army Reserve colonel, "informatsiinyi sprotyv" group coordinator
- Levi Yitzchok of Berditchev (Levi Yosef Yitzhak of Berdichev; 1740–1809), Torah commentator, chassidic rabbi, leader, religious songwriter, and leader of the Berditchev Hasidic dynasty.

Some sources erroneously claim that the pianist Vladimir Horowitz was born in Berdychiv. Horowitz's birth certificate unequivocally gives Kyiv as his birthplace.

== Gallery ==
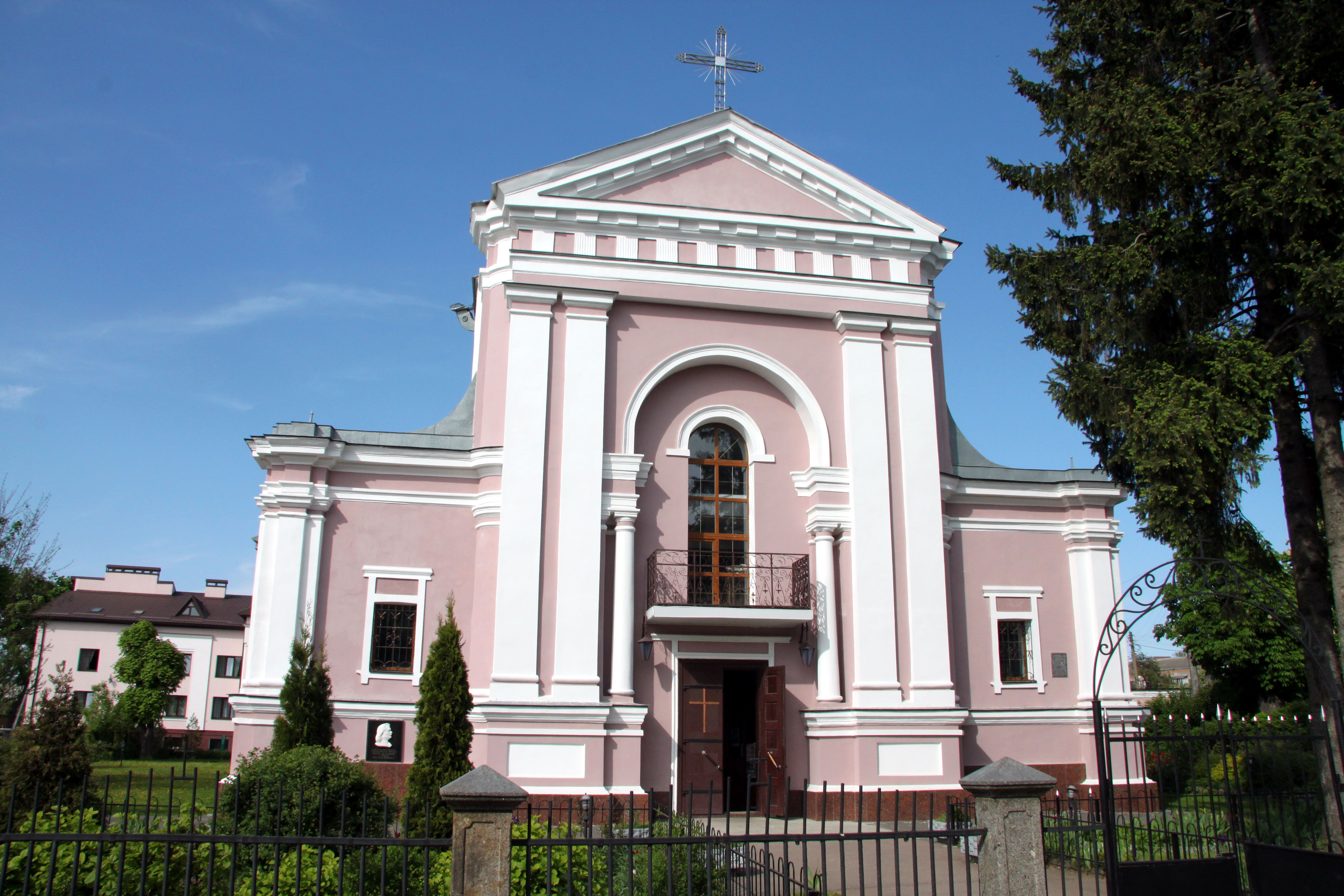
Church of St. Barbara

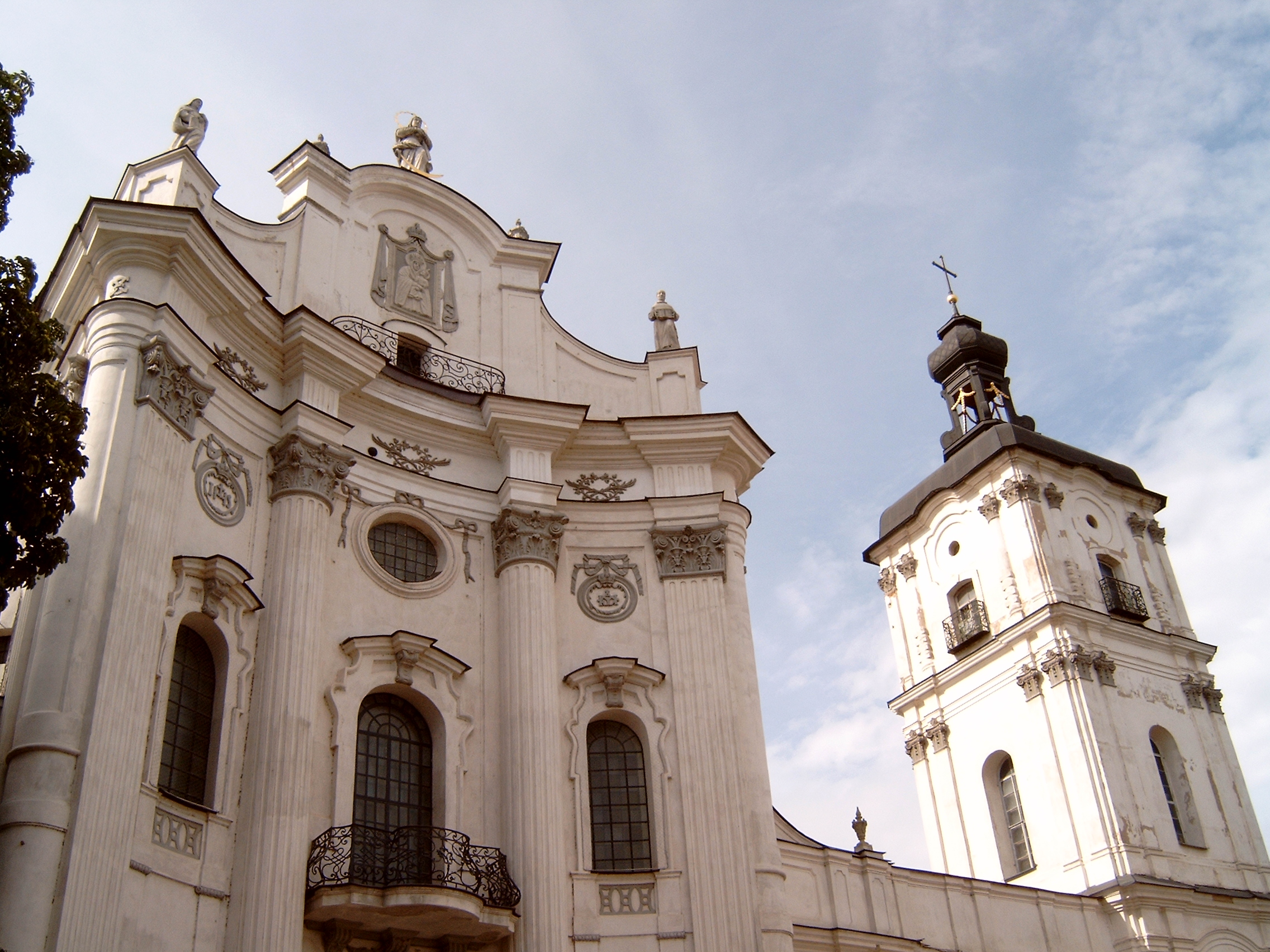
Carmelite monastery

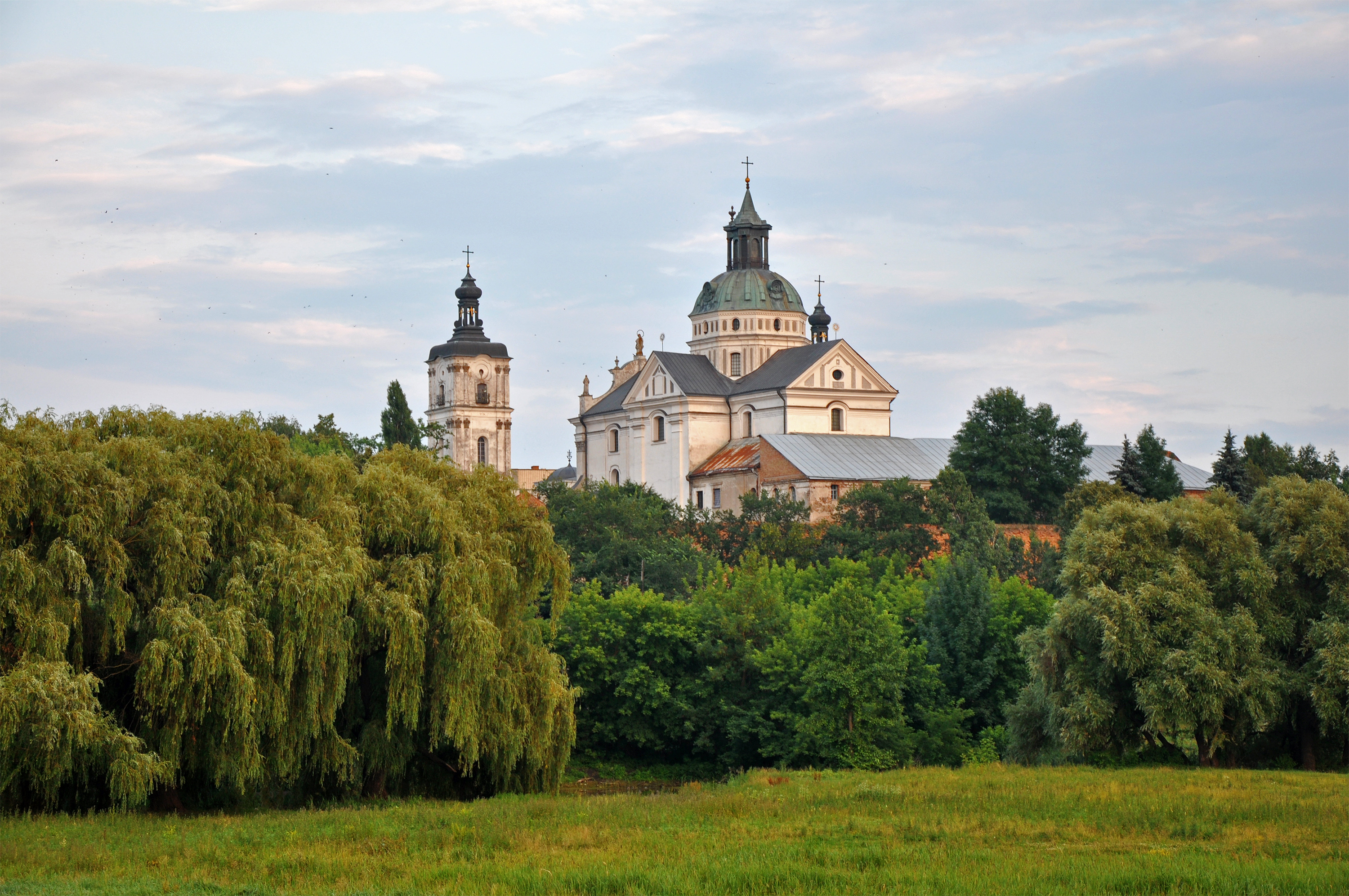
Carmelite monastery

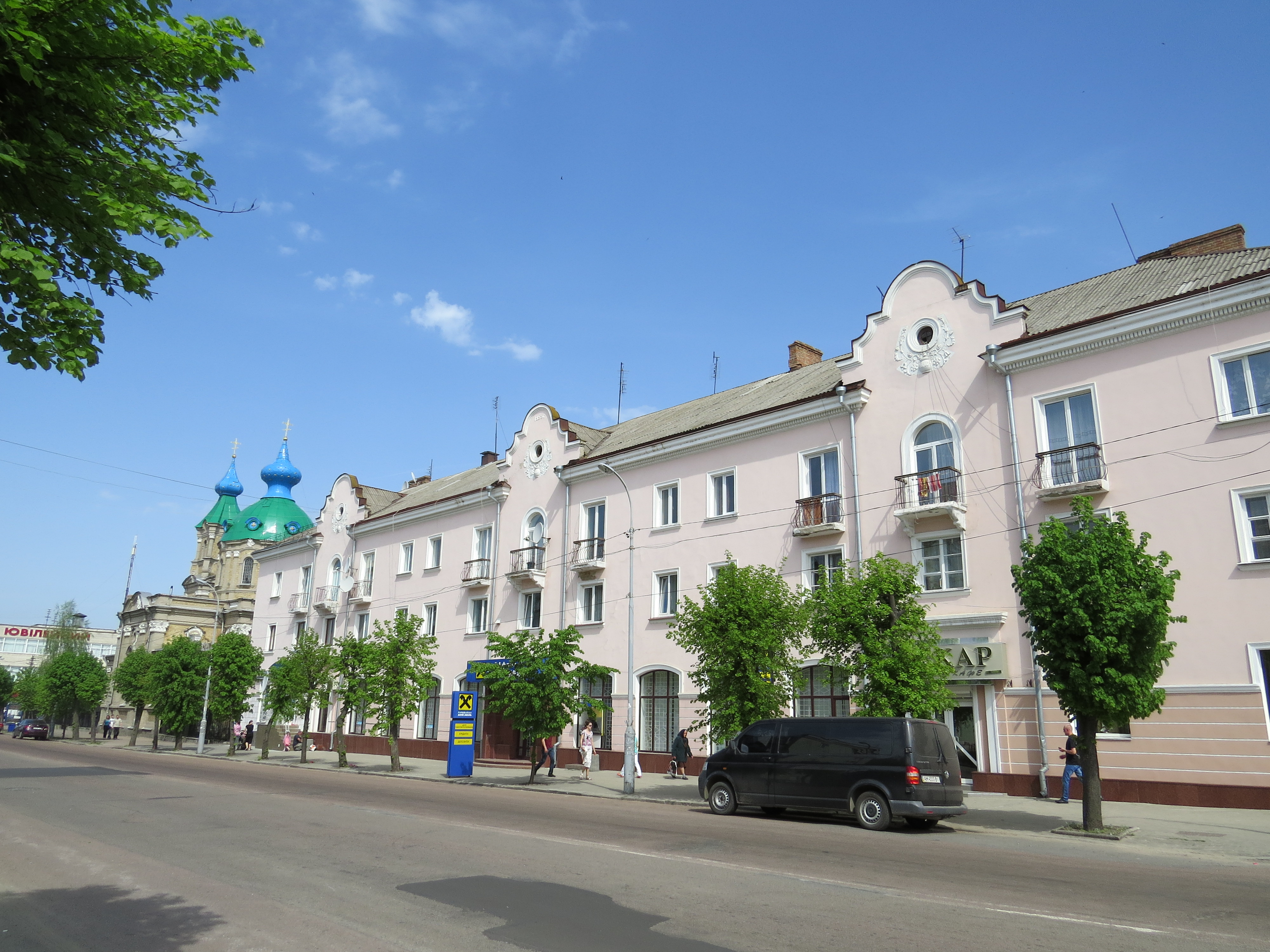
A dwelling house in Berdychiv

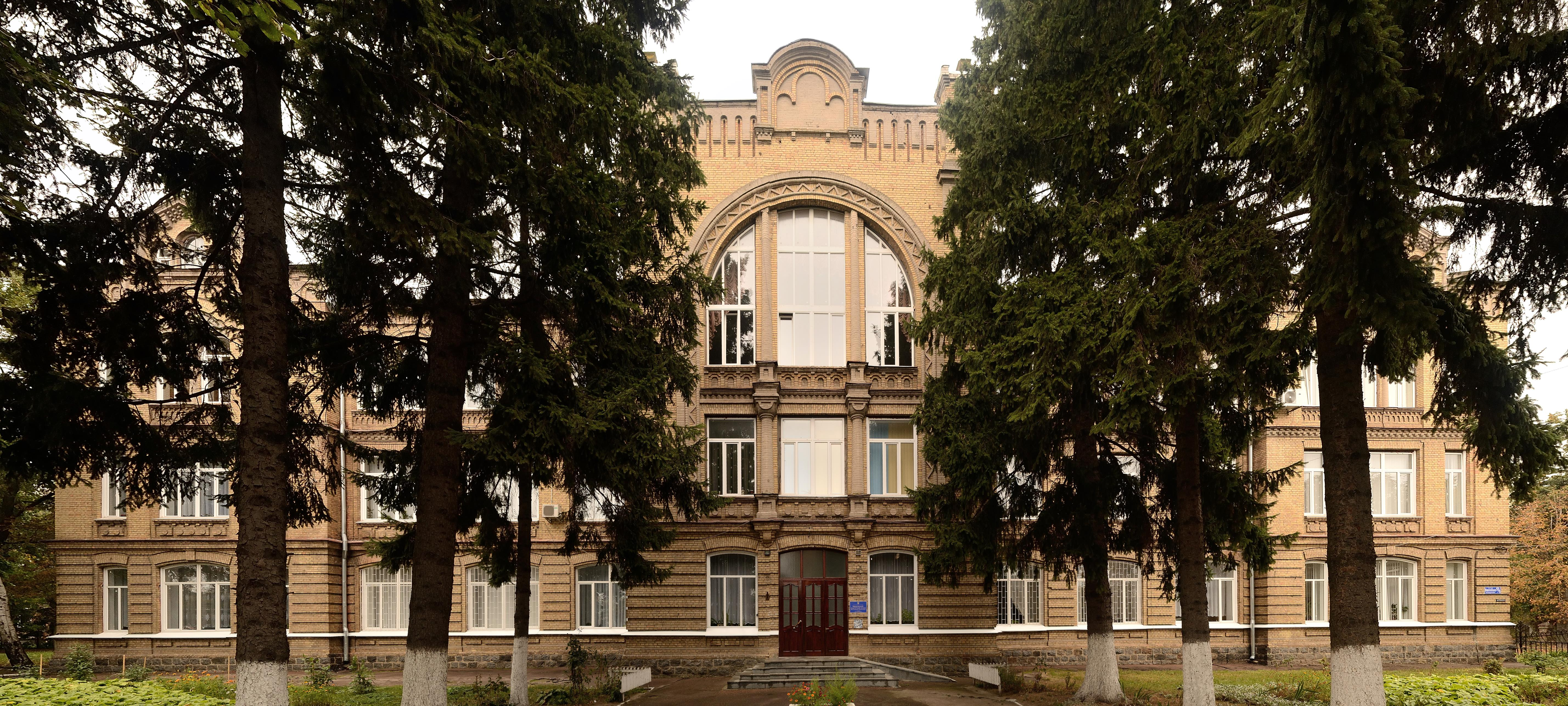
Former commercial college

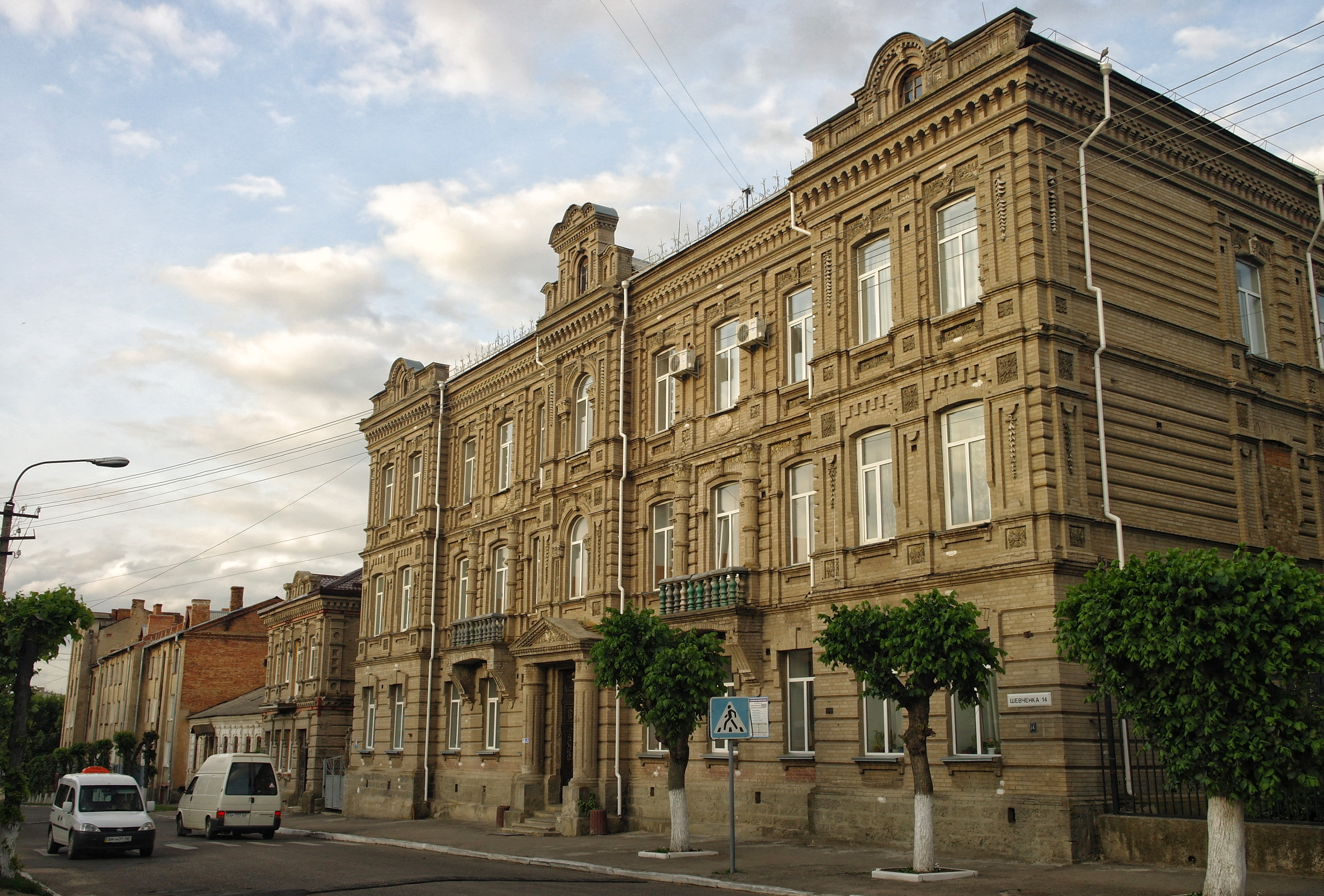
Former hospital building

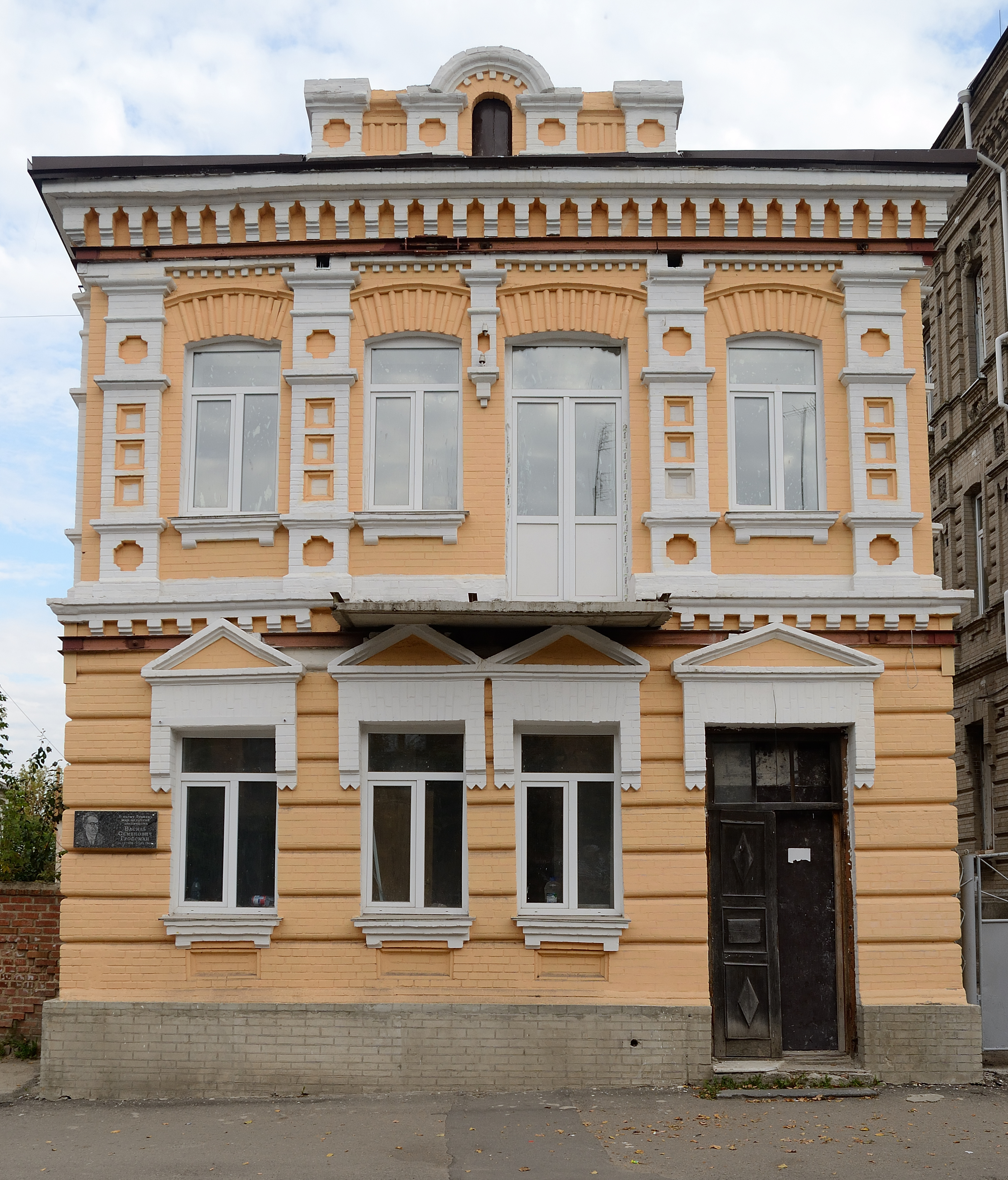
Grossman's Mansion, Berdychiv

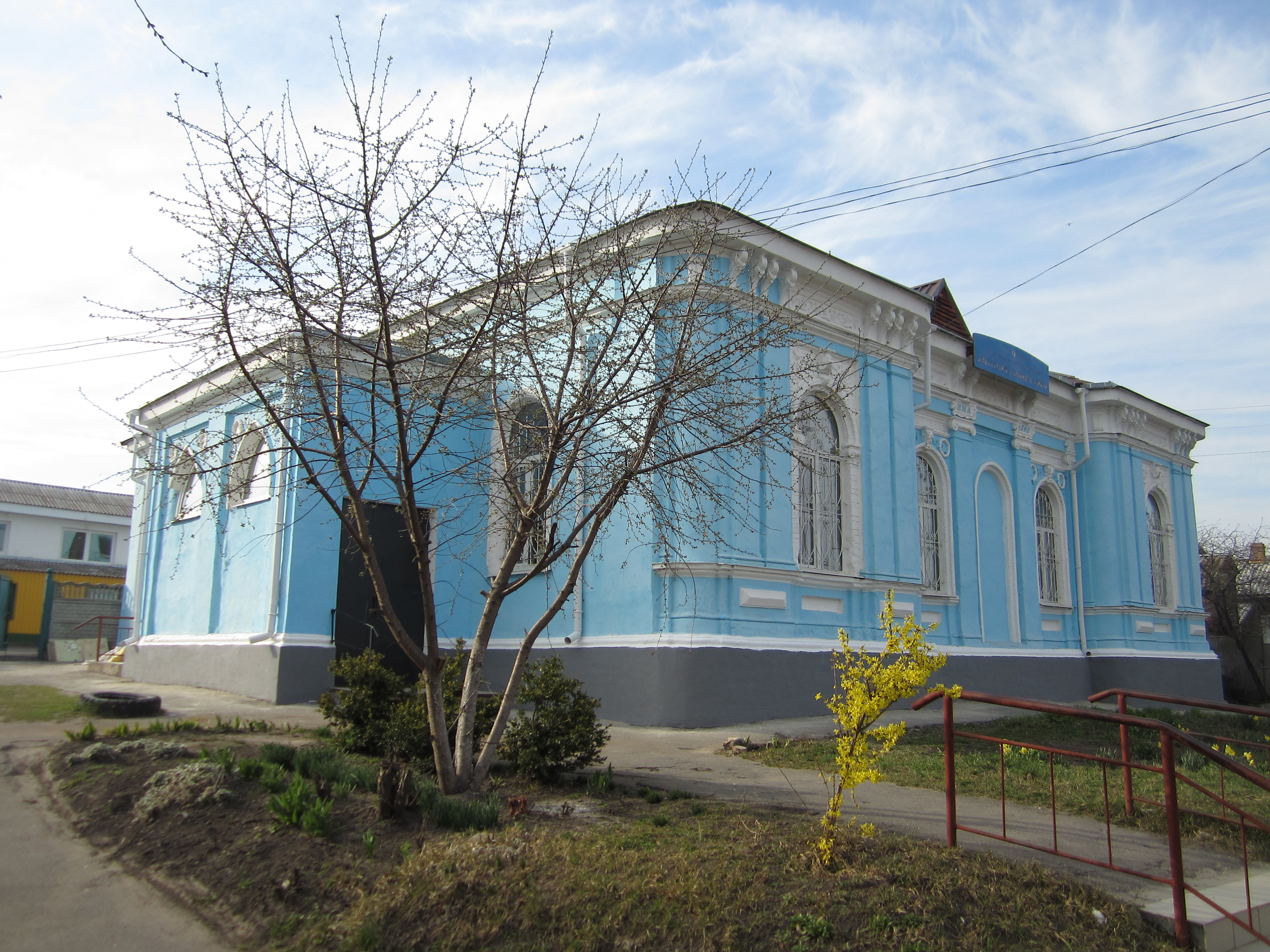
Synagogue

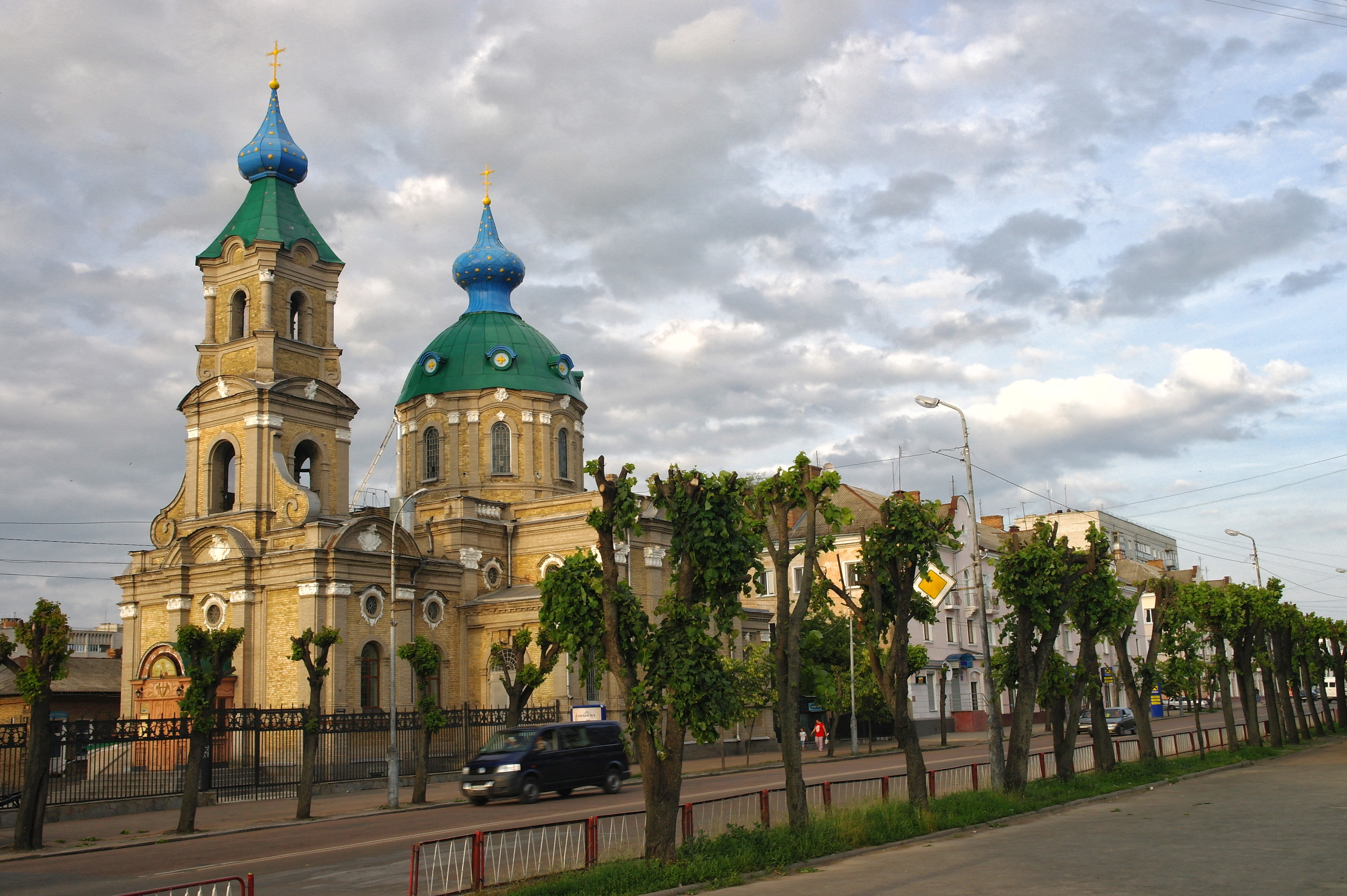
Saint Nicholas Church

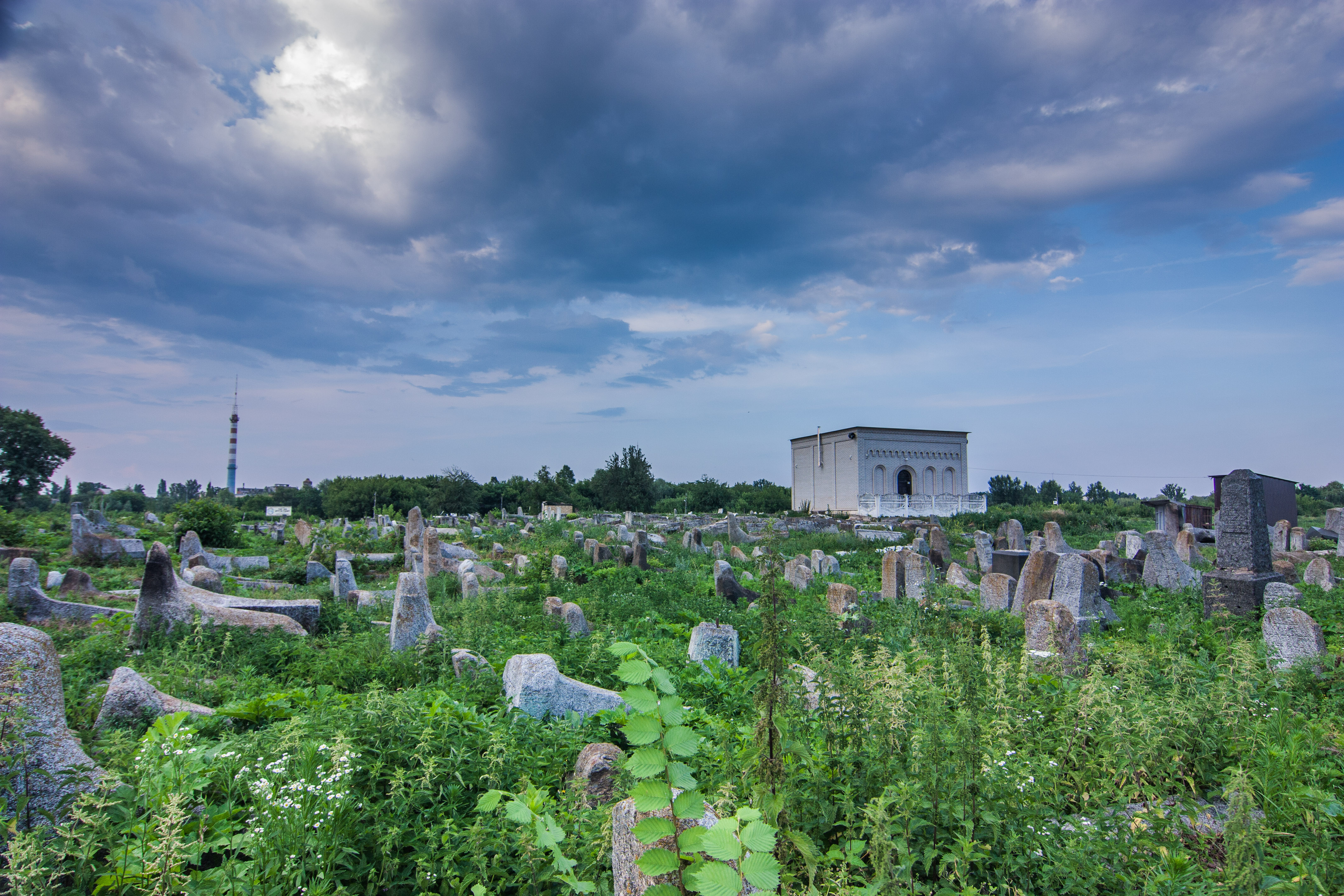
Jewish cemetery

== Berdychiv on stage ==
See: Abraham Ellstein

== See also ==
- History of the Jews in Russia and the Soviet Union
- Berdichev machine-building plant
