= Jakobus Onnen =

Nazi military officer and war criminal (1906–1943)

- Onnen in 1940
- Born: 3 August 1906; Tichelwarf, East Frisia, Germany
- Died: 12 August 1943 (aged 37); Korosten, Reichskommissariat Ukraine
- Military career
- Allegiance: Nazi Germany
- Branch: Sturmabteilung (until 1933); Schutzstaffel (from 1934)
- Conflicts: World War II; Eastern Front

Jakobus Onnen (Note: German pronunciation: [jaˈkoːbʊs ˈɔnən].) (3 August 1906 – 12 August 1943) was a German schoolteacher and a member of the Nazi Schutzstaffel (SS) who served in a mobile killing unit during World War II. He was identified as the individual who appears as the executioner in the Holocaust photograph The Last Jew in Vinnitsa, which depicts a Nazi officer about to shoot a Jewish man at a mass grave in 1941, by the historian Jürgen Matthäus in 2025. Onnen was killed in action on the Eastern Front in 1943 and was never prosecuted for his crimes, remaining unidentified as a war criminal for decades after the war.

== Early life and education ==
Based on documents from the SS Race and Settlement Office analyzed by Neue Osnabrücker Zeitung, Onnen was born on 3 August 1906 as the fifth child of the headmaster Johann Normannus Engelken Onnen in the village of Tichelwarf in East Frisia, Germany, near the Dutch border. After attending the local primary school for four years, he went to the Latin school in Weener in 1917, after which, from 1921, he attended the Realgymnasium for Boys in Leer, Lower Saxony, graduating in 1927. He studied "Modern Languages" (English, French, Dutch and Spanish) at the University of Göttingen, it is possible that there is where he became radicalized. Onnen became politically active in the late Weimar era, and on 1 November 1931 he joined the Nazi party (NSDAP), which was recognized at the time as a group seeking a "revolution through violent means ... with the goal of establishing the National Socialist Third Reich", his party number was 723098. It is assumed that when Onnen took his state exam in May 1932, he was already a fervent supporter of fascist ideology. He enlisted to the Sturmabteilung (SA) in January 1932, a year before the "Seizure of Power" by the Nazis, and on 1 November 1933, he joined the SS, with the membership number 267841. From October 1934 to March 1936, Onnen was engaged in preparatory service for the assessor exam in Heiligenstadt, which was a requirement for his employment in the German Colonial School in Witzenhausen, Hesse. In March 1936, Onnen passed his pedagogical exam, after which he worked as a secondary school teacher, teaching French, English, and physical education. However, according to a May 1939 report on the German Colonial School, his performance as a teacher was subpar: "The teaching staff suffers in both their reputation and their performance because immoral and conscienceless individuals like a teacher Onnen ... are allowed to act. Apart from his inability to master the languages he claims to teach, there are drinking parties and fraternizing with students".

After two failed engagements, Onnen married Ruth (née Hübotter) on 3 April 1939, and in August that same year, Onnen joined the SS Death's Head Standarte "Oberbayern", a nucleus of the Waffen-SS, assigned to the Dachau concentration camp near Munich.

== World War II and Einsatzgruppe service ==
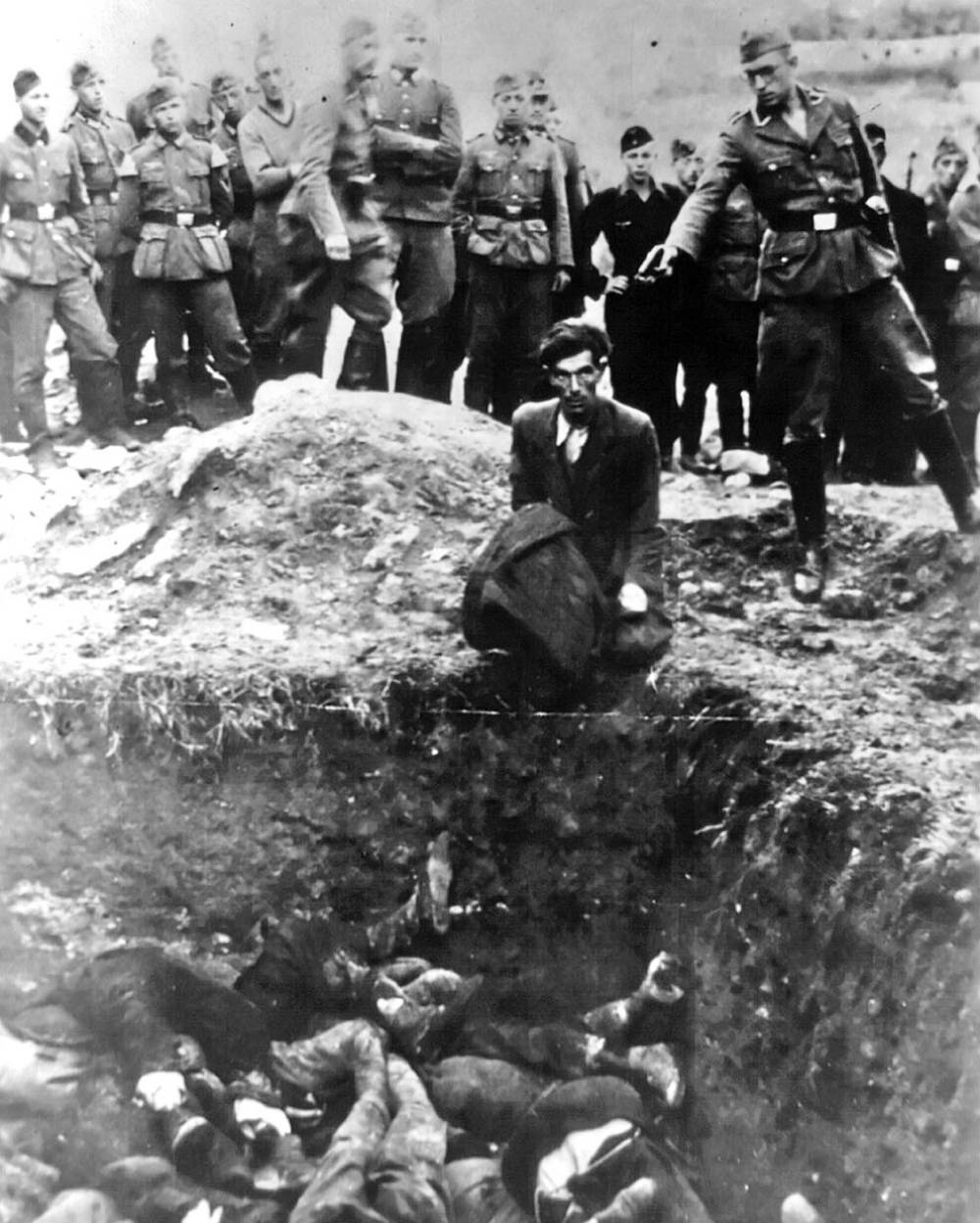
''The Last Jew in Vinnitsa'', 1941. The executioner is believed to be Onnen.

In late 1939, after the German invasion of Poland, Onnen was transferred to the Ordnungspolizei (Order Police), and from January to 1940 he was stationed in the occupied Polish city of Płock, northwest of Warsaw. Following the launch of Operation Barbarossa in June 1941, Onnen was sent to the Eastern Front and became a member of Einsatzgruppe C, a mobile SS death squad operating in Ukraine. Einsatzgruppe C, under the command of SS-Brigadeführer Otto Rasch, was one of several units tasked with mass shootings of Jews, communists, and other civilians in the wake of the German army's advance. The unit comprised roughly 700 men and is estimated to have murdered over 100,000 people, mostly Jews, in Ukraine by the spring of 1942.

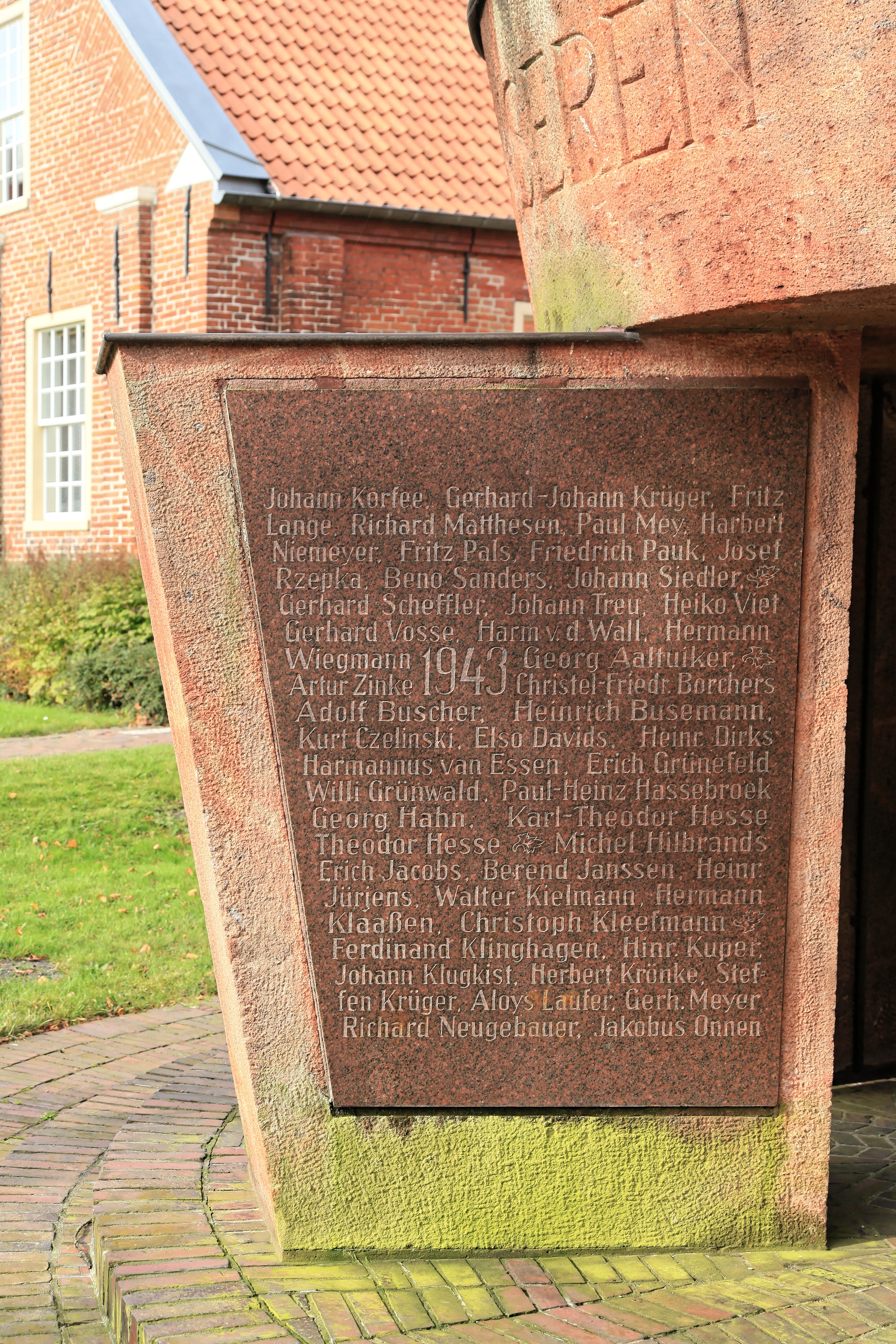
Memorial in front of the Rheiderland local history museum. Onnen's name is listed on the plaque at the very bottom right.

Onnen took part in these atrocities as a low-ranking SS member. By July 1941 he had already committed his first murders as part of Einsatzgruppe C's killing operations. During this time, Onnen was an SS-Unterscharführer (equivalent to a sergeant), which would be the highest rank he ever attained, though it was not a high rank. On 28 July 1941, an SS massacre of Jews took place at the citadel in Berdichev, and a photograph captured a man aiming a pistol at a Jewish man kneeling before a pit of bodies, an image dubbed The Last Jew in Vinnitsa, under the mistaken belief that it was taken in Vinnitsa. In 2025, the historian Jürgen Matthäus identified Onnen as the gunman with 99% certainty after extensive research and an artificial intelligence image analysis conducted by Bellingcat, together with corroborating testimony from Onnen's living relatives. His findings were published in the Journal of Historical Studies. According to Matthäus, participating in mass shootings did not advance one's career in such units: "The participation in such massacres brought neither career nor rewards, in these killing units it was considered normal".

Onnen continued to serve with Nazi security forces through 1942, during which Einsatzgruppe C and affiliated units carried out mass murder across occupied Soviet territories. On 12 August 1943, Onnen, at the age of 37, was killed in combat near Korosten in Zhitomir Oblast, in western Ukraine, and was buried at a military cemetery in Kiev. The letters Onnen sent to his sister during the war were destroyed by her. Because of this, and due to the fact that he died in the field, Onnen was considered a "fallen" soldier, escaping any post-war trial or accountability for his role in the Holocaust. In his hometown region of Weener, his name was inscribed on a local war memorial honoring those victimized by war. After Matthäus published his research the council began considerations to remove his name from the memorial, with the conclusion being that his name would be covered by a plaque with a QR code, through which visitors could find out about him.
