= Henryk Ciereszko =

21st-century Polish Catholic bishop

- Auxiliary Bishop of Białystok
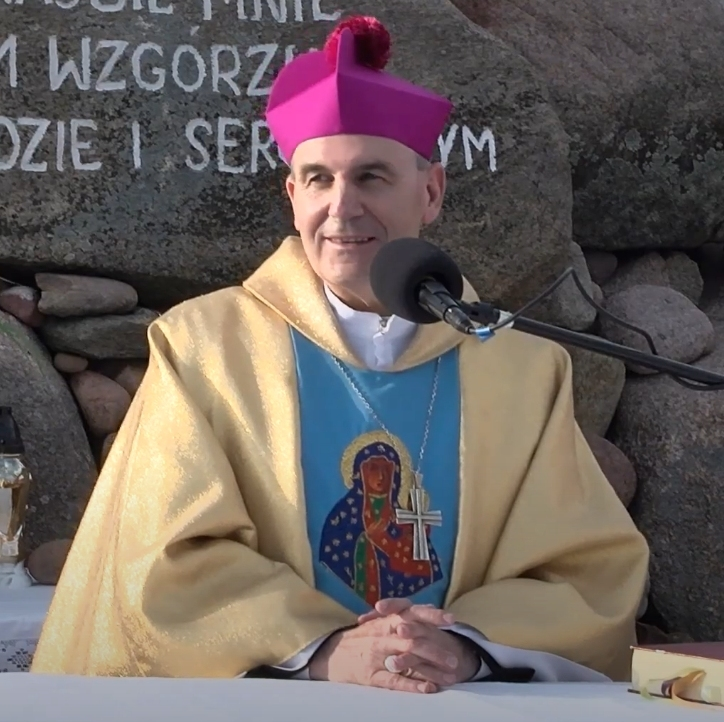
- Ciereszko in 2019
- Church: Roman Catholic Church
- Archdiocese: Białystok
- In office: 17 November 2012 –
- Predecessor: Edward Ozorowski

Orders
- Ordination: 14 June 1981 by Edward Kisiel
- Consecration: 15 December 2012 by Edward Ozorowski
- Rank: Bishop

Personal details
- Born: 9 September 1955 (age 70) Hermanówka, Poland
- Motto: In Misericordia Tua speravi
- Coat of arms

Henryk Ciereszko (born 9 September 1955) is a Polish Roman Catholic bishop serving as the Auxiliary Bishop of the Archdiocese of Białystok and the Titular Bishop of the Diocese of Dices since 2012.

== Biography ==
=== Early life ===
Henryk Ciereszko was born on 9 September 1955 in Hermanówka to parents Jan and Maria. In 1974 he passed his secondary school leaving examination at the VI High School – King Sigismund Augustus and would then begin education at the Archdiocesan Major Seminary in Białystok.

Ciereszko was ordained on 14 June 1981 at the Białystok Cathedral by Bishop Edward Kisiel. He then obtained his master's degree at the John Paul II Catholic University of Lublin. In 1983 he began specialized studies in fundamental theology at the John Paul II Catholic University of Lublin, where he obtained a bachelor's degree in 1985 and a doctorate in 1988 based on the dissertation "Metoda apologetyczna Pawła Swietłowa".

=== Ordination as Bishop ===
On 17 November 2012, Pope Benedict XVI appointed Ciereszko as the Auxiliary Bishop of the Archdiocese of Białystok and the Titular Bishop of the Diocese of Dices. Ciereszko was consecrated on 15 December 2012 at the Białystok Cathedral by Archbishop Edward Ozorowski with the help of Archbishop emeritus Stanisław Szymecki and tha apostolic nuncio, Celestino Migliore. For his episcopal motto, he chose the words: "In Misericordia Tua speravi" (I trusted in Your mercy).
