= Piotr Sawczuk =

Polish Catholic prelate (born 1962)

Mgr. Piotr Henryk Sawczuk
- Bishop of Drohiczyn
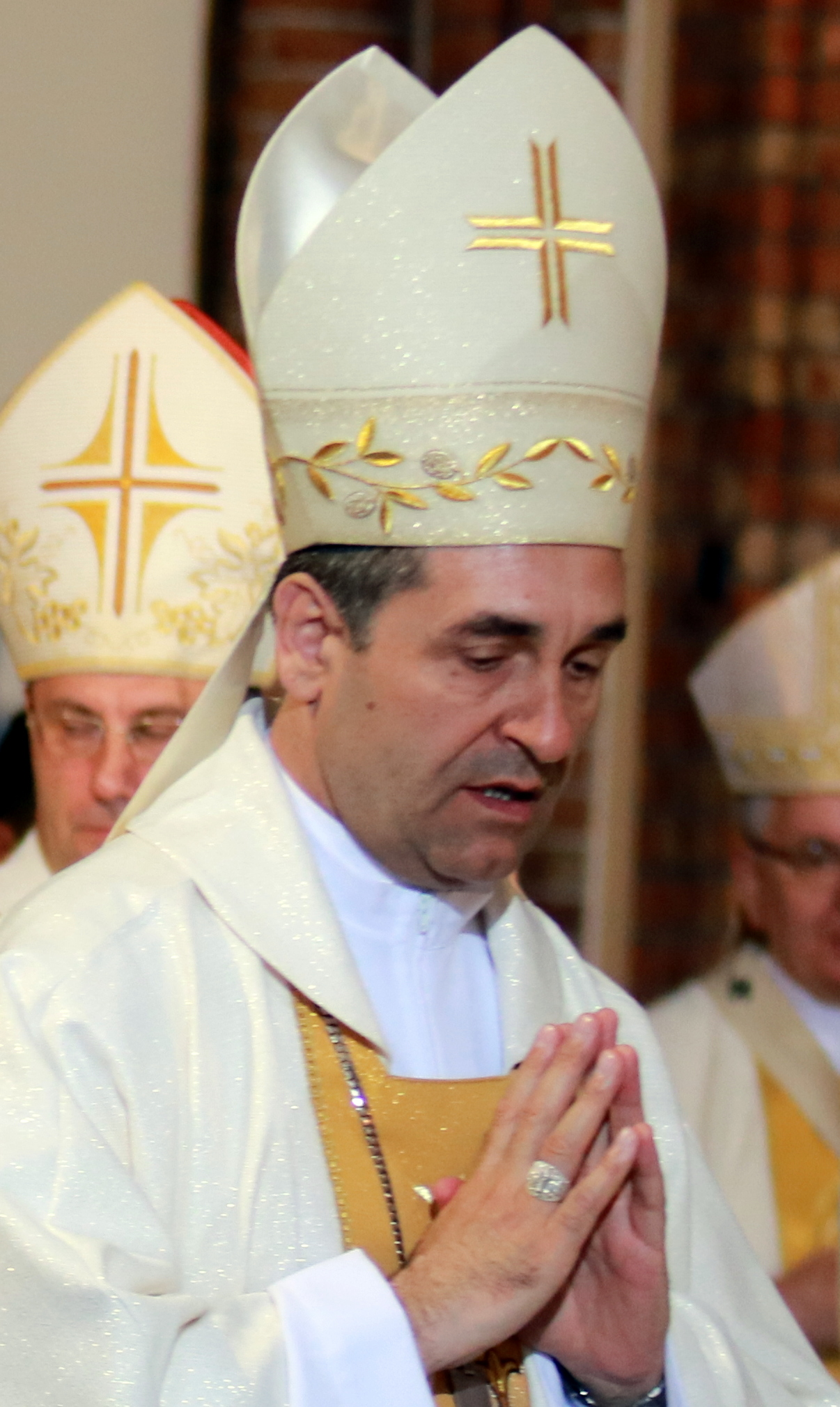
- Swczczuk in 2018
- Church: Catholic
- Province: Białystok
- Diocese: Drohiczyn
- Installed: 2019
- Predecessor: Tadeusz Pikus
- Previous posts: Auxiliary Bishop of Siedlce; Titular Bishop of Ottana

Orders
- Ordination: 6 June 1987 by Jan Mazur
- Consecration: 6 April 2013 by Zbigniew Kiernikowski

Personal details
- Born: 29 January 1962 (age 64) Puczyce, Poland
- Motto: Nomini Tuo Da Gloriam (Glory to Your Name)
- Coat of arms

Piotr Henryk Sawczuk (born 29 January 1962) is a Polish prelate of the Catholic Church, serving as the bishop of the Diocese of Drohiczyn since 2019. He was previously the auxiliary bishop of Siedlce and titular bishop of Ottana from 2013 to 2019.

== Biography ==
=== Early life ===
Sawczuk was born on 29 January 1962 in the village of Puczyce. He grew up in the village of Kornica. In 1981 he graduated from the high school in Biała Podlaska and from 1981 to 1987 Sawczuk completed philosophical and theological studies at the Major Diocesan Seminary in Siedlce. On 6 June 1987, he was ordained a priest by Jan Mazur in the cathedral of the Immaculate Conception of the Blessed Virgin Mary in Siedlce as a priest for that diocese. In 1988, he obtained a master's degree in theology at the Faculty of Theology of the Catholic University of Lublin. In 1989 he began specialized studies at the Faculty of Canon Law of the Academy of Catholic Theology in Warsaw. Sawczuk obtained a master's degree in canon law in 1992, and received a doctorate in canon law in 1996 after defending his dissertation titled "Communicatio in sacris" about the Catholic canon relating to criminal laws.

=== Priestly ministry ===
From 1987 to 1989 Sawczuk worked as a vicar in the parish of Przemień Pańskiego in Wisznice. He served as a chaplain during his doctoral studies. In 1989 he became an employee of the curia for the Siedlce diocese. In the years 1989–1990 he was a notary in the episcopal court. In 1993 he became a judge at the episcopal court. From 1996 to 2003 he was the notary of the diocesan curia. In 2003 Sawczuk became chancellor of the curia. On 7 November 2009, he took the office of vicar general of the diocese. He also actively participated in the work of the Second Synod of the Siedlce Diocese, acting as chairman of the Preparatory Commission (in 2011) and member of the Main Committee (in 2012). As a delegate of Siedlce bishops he gave the sacrament of confirmation and conducted canonical visits to parishes. In 2003 he became the canon of honor, while in 2009 he was the canon canon and prelate scholastic of the Siedlecka Cathedral Chapter.

=== Ordination as bishop ===
On 19 January 2013, Sawczuk was appointed by Pope Benedict XVI as auxiliary bishop of the Diocese of Siedlce, as well as the titular bishop of Ottana. He was ordained a bishop on 6 April 2013 in Siedlce, with the consecrator being Zbigniew Kiernikowski, and the co-consecrators being Celestino Migliore, apostolic nuncio to Poland and titular archbishop of Canosa, and Henryk Tomasik, the bishop of Radom. Sawczuk chose "Nomini Tuo Da Gloriam" (Thy name give glory) as his bishop's motto.

On 17 June 2019 Pope Francis appointed Sawczuk as the new bishop of Drohiczyn, succeeding the retiring Tadeusz Pikus. He was officially installed as bishop in the Cathedral of the Most Holy Trinity in Drohiczyn on 20 July 2019.

=== Life as Bishop ===
As part of the Polish Bishops' Conference, in 2013 Sawczuk became a delegate for the Ministry of Polish Food Processors, and in 2014 a delegate for the Ministry of Lawyers and a member of the Legal Council.
