= Antoni Pacyfik Dydycz =

Polish Roman Catholic bishop (1938–2025)

Antoni Dydycz OFMCap
- Bishop of Drohiczyn
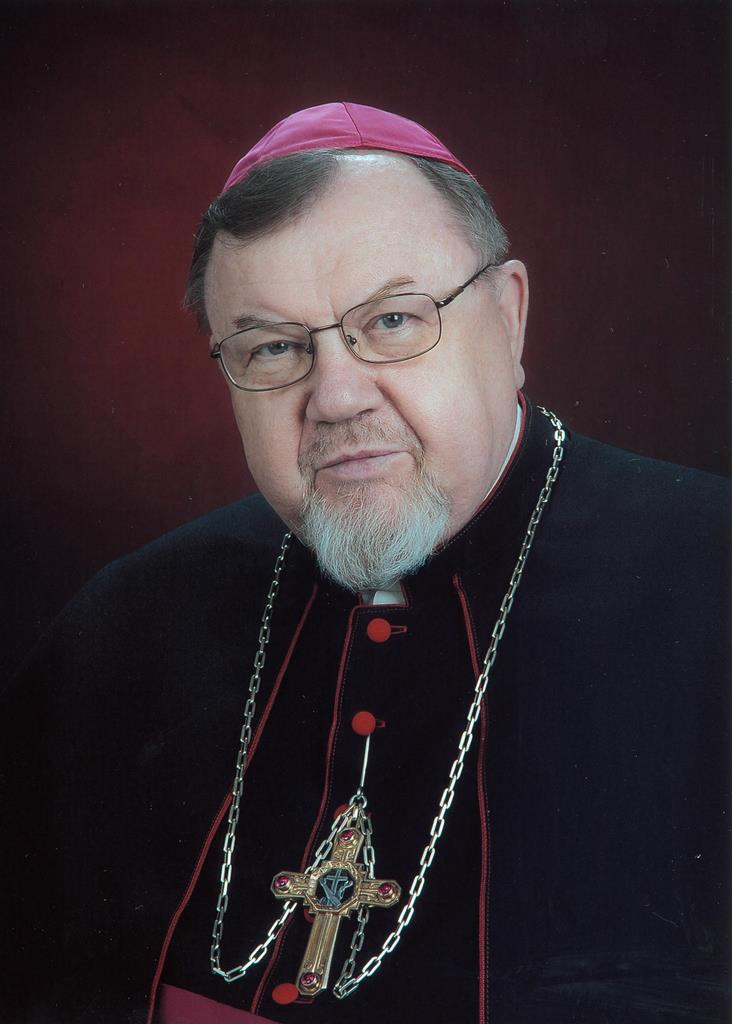
- Church: Catholic Church
- Diocese: Drohiczyn
- In office: 20 June 1994 – 29 March 2014
- Predecessor: Władysław Jędruszuk
- Successor: Tadeusz Pikus

Orders
- Ordination: 29 June 1963 by Czesław Falkowski
- Consecration: 10 July 1994 by Józef Kowalczyk

Personal details
- Born: 24 August 1938 Serpelice, Lublin Voivodeship, Poland
- Died: 14 September 2025 (aged 87) Drohiczyn, Podlaskie Voivodeship, Poland
- Motto: Populus Tuus - hereditas Tua; (Your People - your inheritance)

Antoni Pacyfik Dydycz, OFMCap (24 August 1938 – 14 September 2025) was a Polish prelate of the Roman Catholic Church. He served as bishop of Drohiczyn from 1994 to 2014.

== Biography ==
Born in Serpelice, Dydycz became a member of the Order of Friars Minor Capuchin. He was ordained to the priesthood on 29 June 1963.

On 20 June 1994, he was appointed bishop of Drohiczyn. Dydycz received his episcopal consecration on the following 10 July from Józef Kowalczyk, nuncio for Poland, with archbishop of Białystok, Stanislaw Szymecki, and archbishop emeritus of Camerino-San Severino Marche, Francesco Gioia, serving as co-consecrators.

On 29 March 2014, his resignation was accepted upon reaching the age of 75. Dydycz died on 14 September 2025, at the age of 87.

Catholic Church titles
Preceded by Władysław Jędruszuk	Bishop of Drohiczyn; 1992–2006	Succeeded by Tadeusz Pikus
