= Sidi Salah =

Sidi Salah can refer to the following places in Tunisia:

- Oued Sidi Salah, a wadi of eastern Tunisia
- Henchir-Sidi-Salah, a rural locality and archaeological site
- Sidi Salah Bou Kabrine Mosque
- Sidi Salah Zlaoui Mausoleum, a mausoleum in Béja
- Sidi-Salah cemetery, a cemetery in Le Bardo
- Sidi Salah, a small village 19 kilometres (12 mi) from Sidi Bouzid in the Sidi Bouzid Governorate
- Sidi Salah, a quarter of La Soukra, itself a northern suburb of Tunis.
