= Transfiguration Church, Novogrudok =

Coordinates: 53°36′05″N 25°49′49″E

Transfiguration Church
- Фарны касцёл Праабражэння Гасподняга
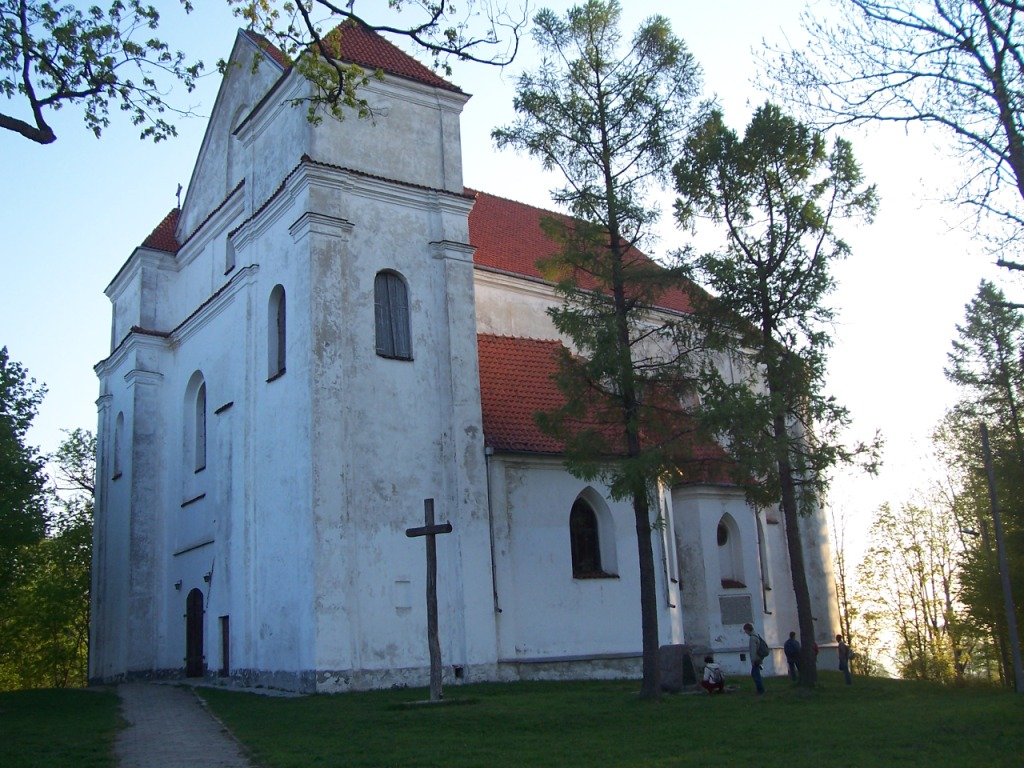
- Transfiguration Church, the pointed windows mark the older chapels from the Gothic period
- Transfiguration Church
- Location: Novogrudok
- Country: Belarus
- Denomination: Catholic Church

Architecture
- Functional status: Active

The Transfiguration Roman Catholic Church (Belarusian: Фарны касцёл Праабражэння Гасподняга) in Novogrudok, Belarus, is a Baroque church erected in 1712–1723, replacing an earlier Gothic building from the late 14th century, and originally consecrated under the title of Corpus Christi. Two Gothic chapels survive and are included in the Baroque building.

In 1799, the poet Adam Mickiewicz was baptized in this church.

Closed in 1857, re-opened in 1906. Currently active.

== History ==
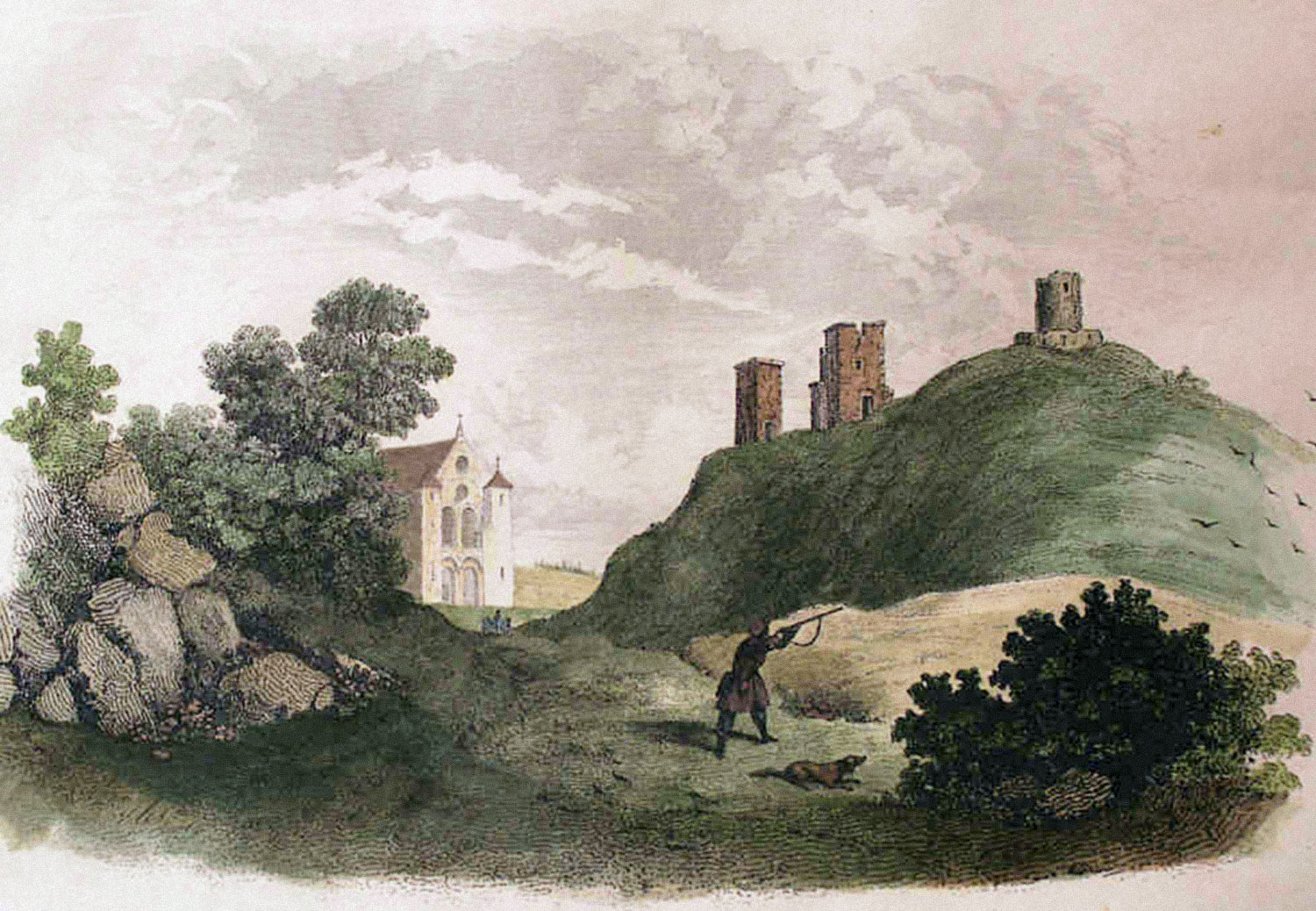
Navahrudak in 1835, Auguste François Alés

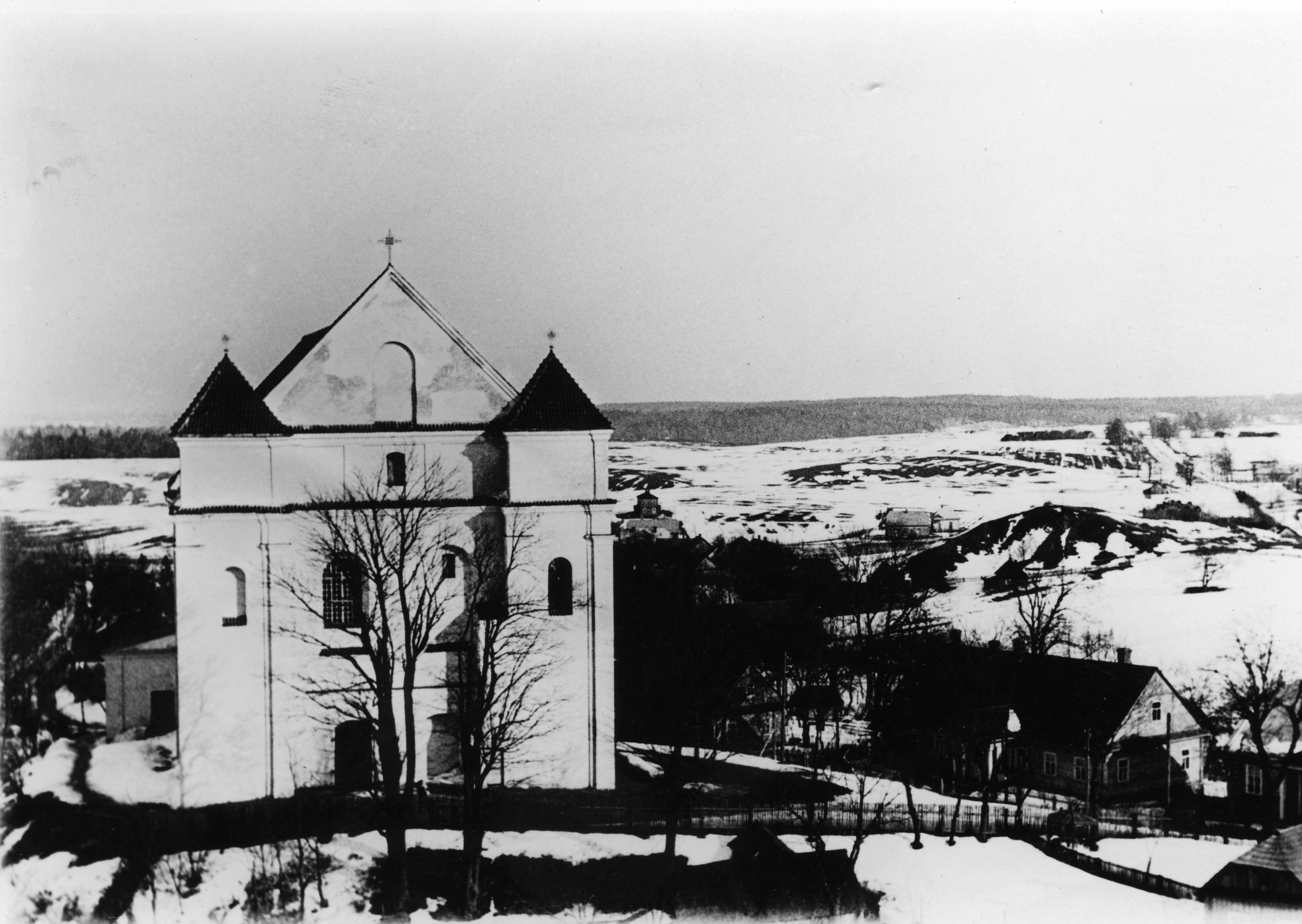
The church in 1925-39

Vytautas the Great founded the church in 1395 on the site of a former pagan temple. In 1422 Władysław II Jagiełło married here his fourth wife Sophia of Halshany, establishing the Jagiellonian dynasty. In 1643 local castellan Jan Rudamina added a marble bas-relief in commemoration of the Navahrudaks knights fallen in the Battle of Khotyn in 1621.

In 1712-1740 the church was rebuilt. The local masons Jakub Boksza, Jerzy Urłowski, Andrzej Szarecki, Jerzy Stepkowski headed the construction. The keystone was consecrated on July 14, 1714, by the bishop Maciej Józef Ancuta. The building was designed as a one-nave basilica with round apse and two towers at the main facade. Two older faceted towers of XIV century were also included into the new building.

On February 12, 1799, the poet Adam Mickiewicz was baptised here. In 1812 during the French invasion of Russia Napoleon’s troops used the church as a food storage. After the war the services in the church were resumed, but in 1864 it was closed again in the aftermath of the January Uprising.

The building decayed until 1906. In 1921 it was reconstructed by prince Stanisław Albrecht Radziwiłł and architect Bayle. The bishop Zygmunt Łoziński consecrated the restored church in 1922. In 1929 it was given to the Sisters of the Holy Family of Nazareth.

During the World War II the city was occupied by the Nazis. The sisterhood organized a clandestine school for Polish children with lessons on history and Polish language. On August 1, 1943, the Gestapo executed 11 nuns and the school’s principal. The burial place of the Martyrs of Nowogródek existed near the church until 1991.

Under the Soviets the church was closed in 1948 and reopened only in 1984. The services were resumed in 1992. The latest restoration was completed in 1998.

== See also ==
- Transfiguration

== Sources ==
- Абламскі, В. Я.; Чарняўскі, І. М.; Барысюк, Ю. А. (2009). Дзяржаўны спіс гісторыка-культурных каштоўнасцей Рэспублікі Беларусь [Official List of Belarusian Objects of Cultural Heritage] (in Belarusian). Даведнік. p. Minsk. ISBN 978-985-6828-35-8.
- Яцкевіч (2005). Вялікае Княства Літоўскае (энцыклапедыя) [The Encyclopedia of the Grand Duchy of Lithuania]. Minsk: BelEn. p. 363. ISBN 978-985-11-0393-1.
