= Church of St. Charles Borromeo, Pinsk =

Roman Catholic Church in Pinsk, Belarus

Coordinates: 52°5′N 26°11′E

Church of St. Charles Borromeo
- Касцёл Святога Карла Барамея
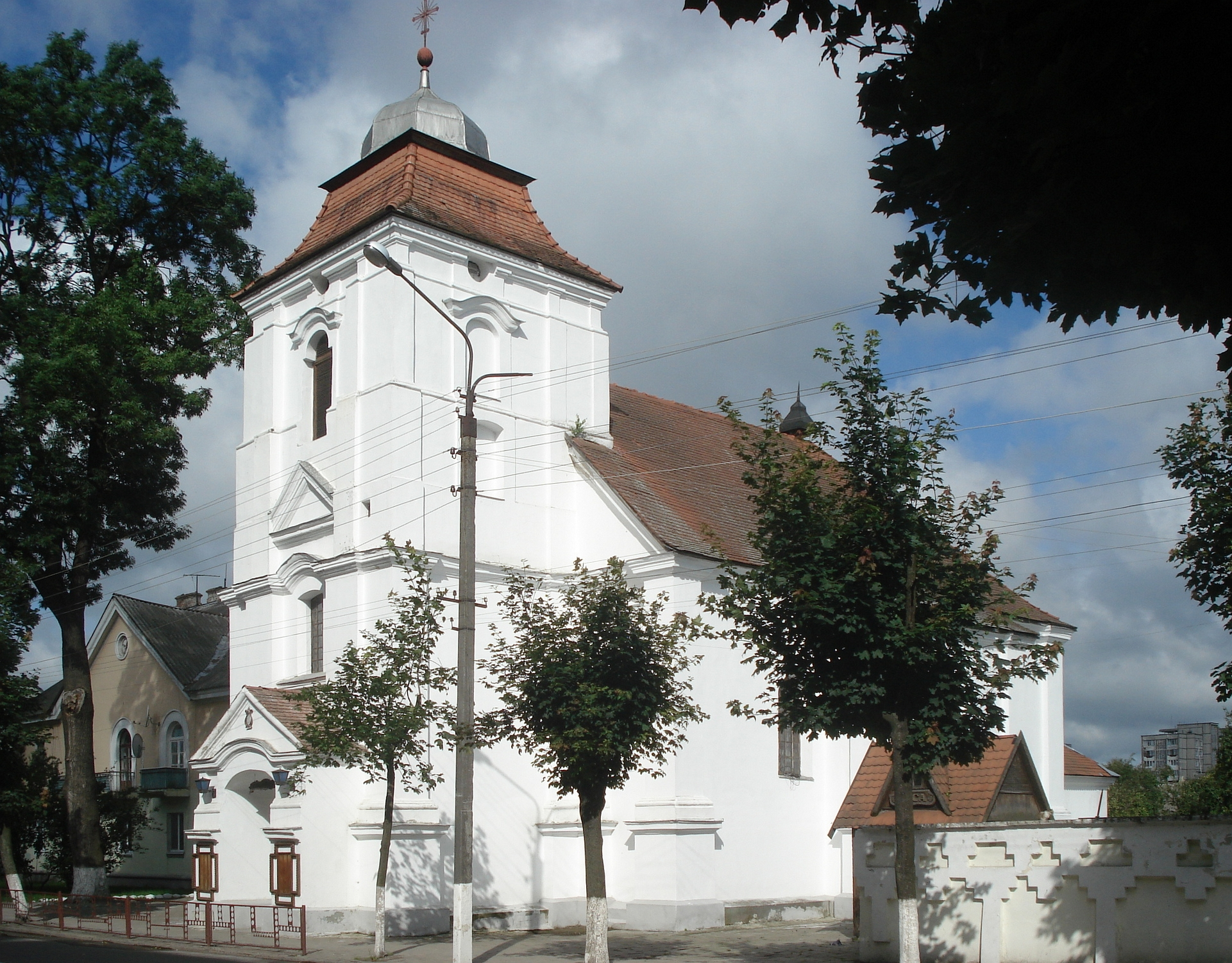
- Church of St. Charles Borromeo
- Location: 37, Kirova str., Pinsk
- Country: Belarus
- Denomination: Roman Catholic church

Architecture
- Functional status: Concert hall
- Style: Baroque
- Years built: 1770–1782
- Closed: 1960

Administration
- Diocese: Roman Catholic Diocese of Pinsk

The Church of Charles Borromeo (Belarusian: Касцёл Карла Барамея; Russian: Церковь Святого Карла Борромео; Polish: Kościół św. Karola Boromeusza) is a former Roman Catholic church in Pinsk, Belarus. Constructed between 1770 and 1782, it was consecrated in the name of St. Charles Borromeo, then reconstructed in the second part of the 19th century and dedicated to the Holy Trinity.

The church was closed by the Soviet authorities in the 1960s and repurposed as a music hall. Nowadays it is one of the cultural centres of Pinsk.

It is listed as a monument of historical heritage of Belarus.

== History ==
=== Construction ===
The Catholic parish on the outskirts of Pinsk in Karolin was established by the Polish-Lithuanian nobleman Jan Karol Dolski in 1695. In that year the first wooden church was constructed. In 1756 the Apostolic Union of Secular Priests arrived in Pinsk. They collected money and between 1770 and 1782 built a stone church. It was consecrated in 1784 in the name of St. Charles Borromeo.

=== 18th–20th centuries ===
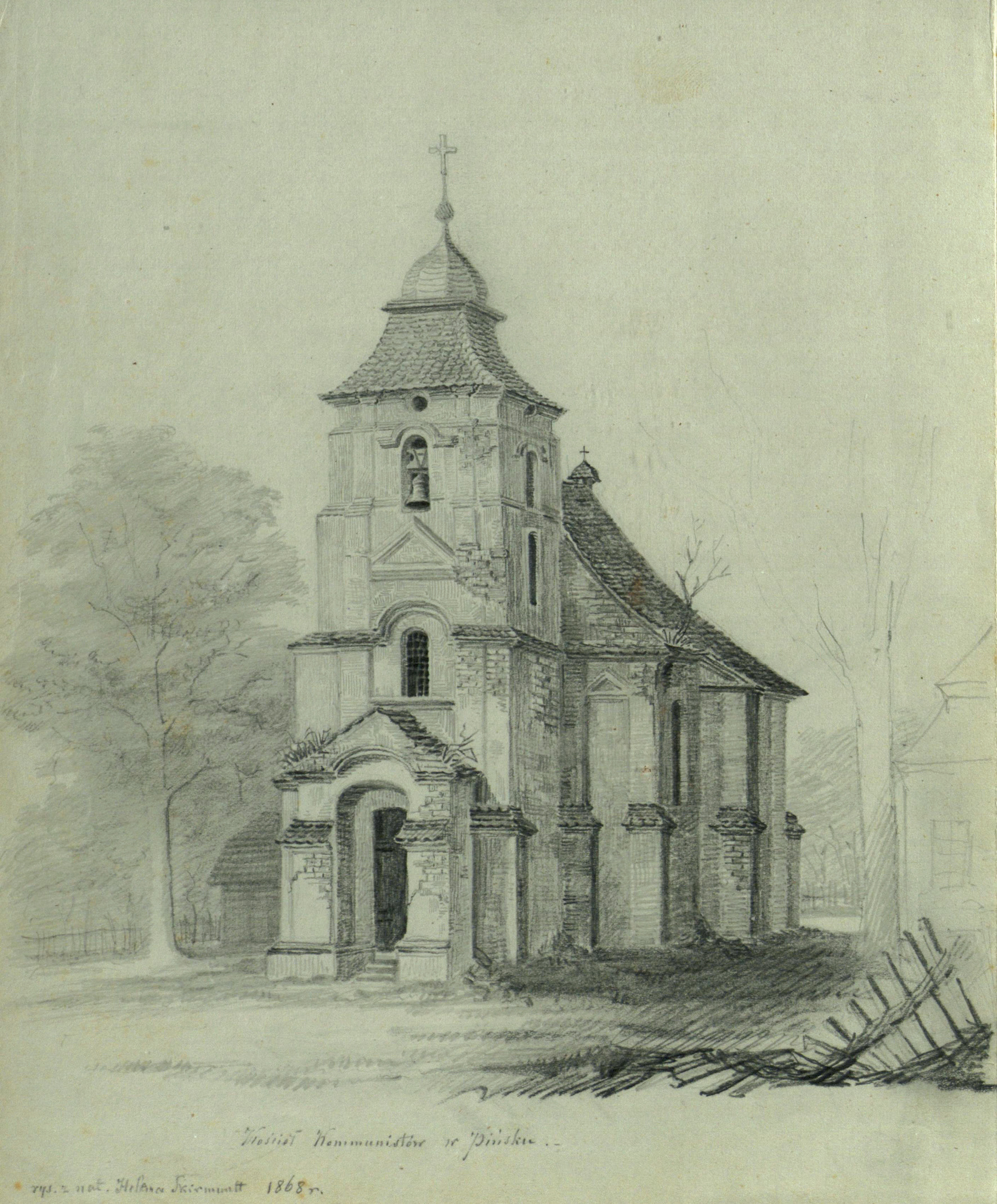
The church in 1868, painting by A. Skirmunt

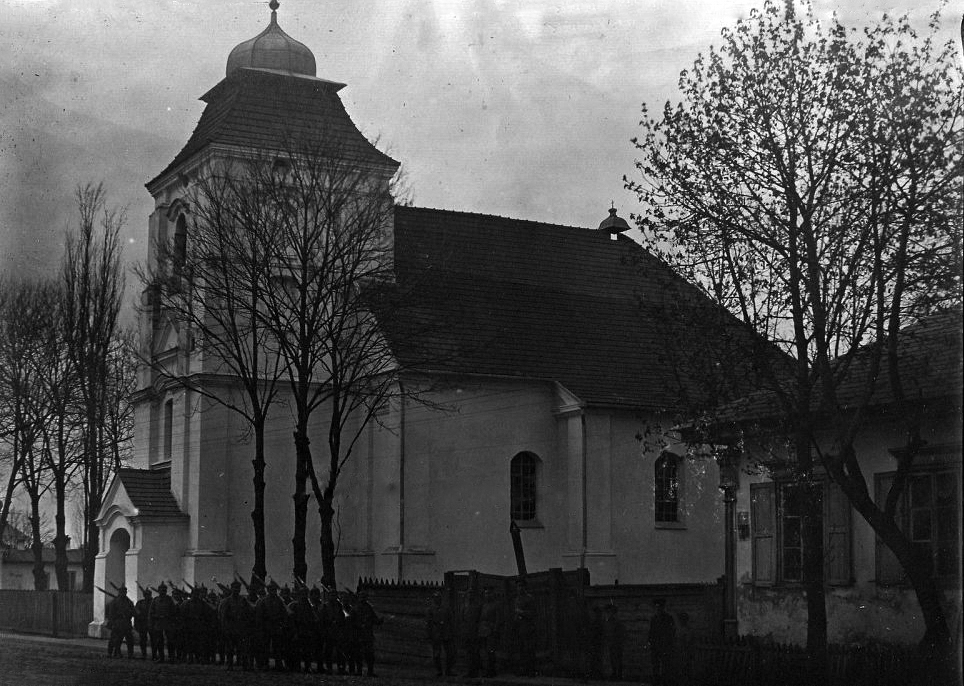
Soldiers in front of the church, 1916

By the end of the 18th century the order fell into decline. With the death of the last abbot, Isidor Kontonovich, the church was abandoned. In the second half of the 19th century, the building was restored and consecrated in the name of the Holy Trinity. Since 1912 the church has been a filial of the Cathedral Basilica of the Assumption of the Blessed Virgin Mary.

After World War II the church was active for several years but was then closed by order of the Soviet authorities in the 1960s. The building was repurposed as a concert hall for the pipe organ.

== Architecture ==
The church is an example of Baroque architecture combined with a castle-like style. It has one nave without apse, massive walls up to 2 m (6 ft 7 in) thick and a small transept. The nave is divided by three bays. The original interiors were destroyed in the 1960s.

In the 1990s new window panes and an electric organ were installed in the church.

The latest restorations to the church were completed in 2013.

== Sources ==
- Gabrus, T. V. (2001). MCH - belaruskae baroka Мураваныя харалы: сакральная архітэктура беларускага барока [Sacred Architecture of Belarusian Baroque] (in Belarusian). Minsk: Ураджай. p. 287. ISBN 9789850404992.
- Yakimovich, Y. A. (1990). Свод памятников истории и культуры Белоруссии. Брестская область (in Russian). Minsk: Белорусская Советская Энциклопедия имени Петруся Бровки. p. 320. ISBN 9785857000175.
