= St. Kazimierz Church, Białystok =

St. Kazimierz Church in Białystok
- Kościół św. Kazimierza Królewicza w Białymstoku
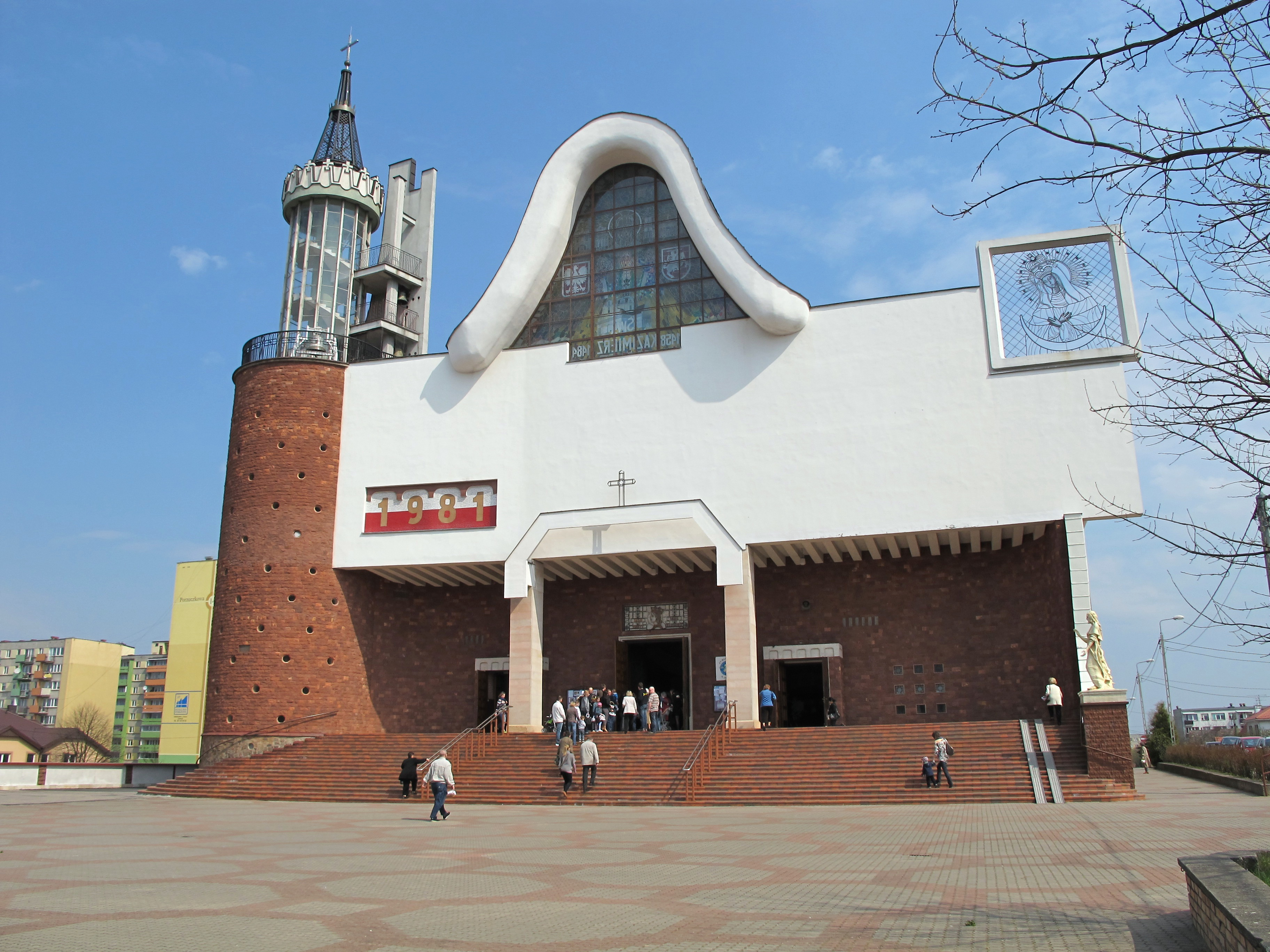
- St. Kazimierz Church in Białystok
- 53°08′59″N 23°07′21.25″E
- Location: 2 Św. Kazimierza, Dziesięciny I District, Białystok
- Denomination: Roman Catholic

History
- Founded: 21 June 1984
- Consecrated: 27 October 2002

Architecture
- Architect: Jan Krutul
- Style: Modenism
- Groundbreaking: April 1983
- Completed: 1993

St. Kazimierz Church in Białystok (Polish: Kościół św. Kazimierza Królewicza w Białymstoku) is a Roman Catholic parish church located in the Dziesięciny I District in the city Białystok capital of Podlaskie Voivodeship in north-eastern Poland. The parish is the largest in the Archdiocese of Białystok and contains about 15,000 people. Next to the church there is a monument dedicated to Solidarity movement and on the outer church wall there is the inscription '1981' to mark the year Solidarity movement was established.

== History ==
Following the massive development of blocks and panel construction in Dziesięciny I and Dziesięciny II districts, there was a growing demand for the construction of a church in the area. The place where the church stands today was used for gatherings of Solidarity members who also prayed and agitated for the church construction. On June 21, 1981, the banner of the Białystok Solidarity Regional Board was consecrated here. The permission to build a new church was signed by Voivode of Białystok Voivodeship, Kazimierz Dunaj in March 1981 and the construction permit was given in February 1983. This was the first formal permission given after the establishment of Communism to build a new Catholic church in Białystok. As a result of the competition, the design of a two-level church with a catechetical complex by architect engineer Jan Krutul was selected. Construction works started in April 1983. The lower church was put into use in its shell state on June 21, 1984, and services began to be held there. The first service, midnight mass in the upper church was held on 25 December 1993. The colors of the church's facade refer to the country's national colours.

The building, which stands out in the panorama of Białystok, was covered with a wide roof in the form of a boat, the tower-lantern is associated with the presence of the patron saint - Saint Casimir. On October 14, 1984, nationwide celebrations of the 500th anniversary of the death of saint took place at the church which was still under construction, with the participation of the Polish Episcopate under the leadership of Cardinal Józef Glemp, Primate of Poland. On March 4, 2002, the church celebrated the metropolitan celebration of the 400th anniversary of the canonization of St. Kazimierz. The church was consecrated on October 27, 2002. Finishing works on the church and cleaning the area around the church continued. The top of the tower has been erected and the interior furnishing of the upper church has been completed.

In June 2017, during the 40th anniversary of the parish's existence, the first parish priest and the builder of the church - Prelate Bogdan Maksimowicz received the Golden Cross of Merit. In 2019 the church passed through modernization.

On the night of December 30–31, 2020 the church experienced vandalism attack when the altar was destroyed.

In November 2023 the icon Image of Our Lady of the Solidarity Workers (Polish: Obraz Matki Bożej Robotników "Solidarności”) was temporarily placed in the church.
