= Władysław Jędruszuk =

Polish Roman Catholic bishop (1918–1994)

His Excellency Władysław Jędruszuk
- Bishop of Drohiczyn
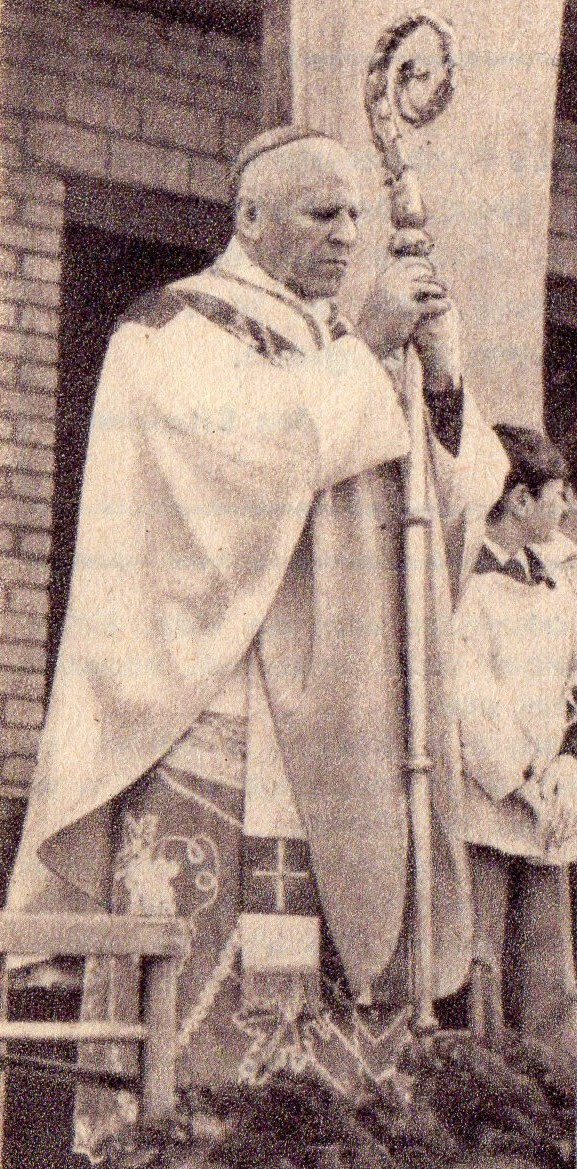
- Archdiocese: Białystok
- Diocese: Drohiczyn
- Appointed: 5 June 1991
- Term ended: 25 May 1994
- Predecessor: First
- Successor: Antoni Pacyfik Dydycz
- Previous posts: Auxiliary Bishop of Pinsk (1962–1967); Titular Bishop of Clysma (1962–1991); Apostolic Administrator of Pinsk (1967–1991)

Personal details
- Born: 19 November 1918 Lipno, Poland
- Died: 25 May 1994 (aged 75) Sokołów Podlaski, Poland

Władysław Jędruszuk (19 November 1918 – 25 May 1994) was the first bishop of the Diocese of Drohiczyn.

== Biography ==
Jędruszuk was born in 1918 to Łukasz and Elżbieta Jędruszuk. He began studying at a gymnasium in Drohiczyn in 1929; he later began attending the diocesan seminary in Pinsk in 1937. He was ordained a priest by Kazimierz Bukraba on 13 May 1943. He became a professor of liturgy at the diocesan seminary in Pinsk in 1952.

On 19 November 1962, Jędruszuk was appointed by John XXIII as auxiliary bishop of Pinsk and titular bishop of Clismy. He was consecrated on 23 June 1963 by Michał Krzywicki; he was appointed apostolic administrator of Pinsk after Krzywicki's death. He was then appointed bishop of Drohiczyn in June 1991; he assumed the position on 26 June 1991. He died in 1994 in the hospital at Sokołów Podlaski.
