= Diocese of Dices =

Roman Catholic titular see

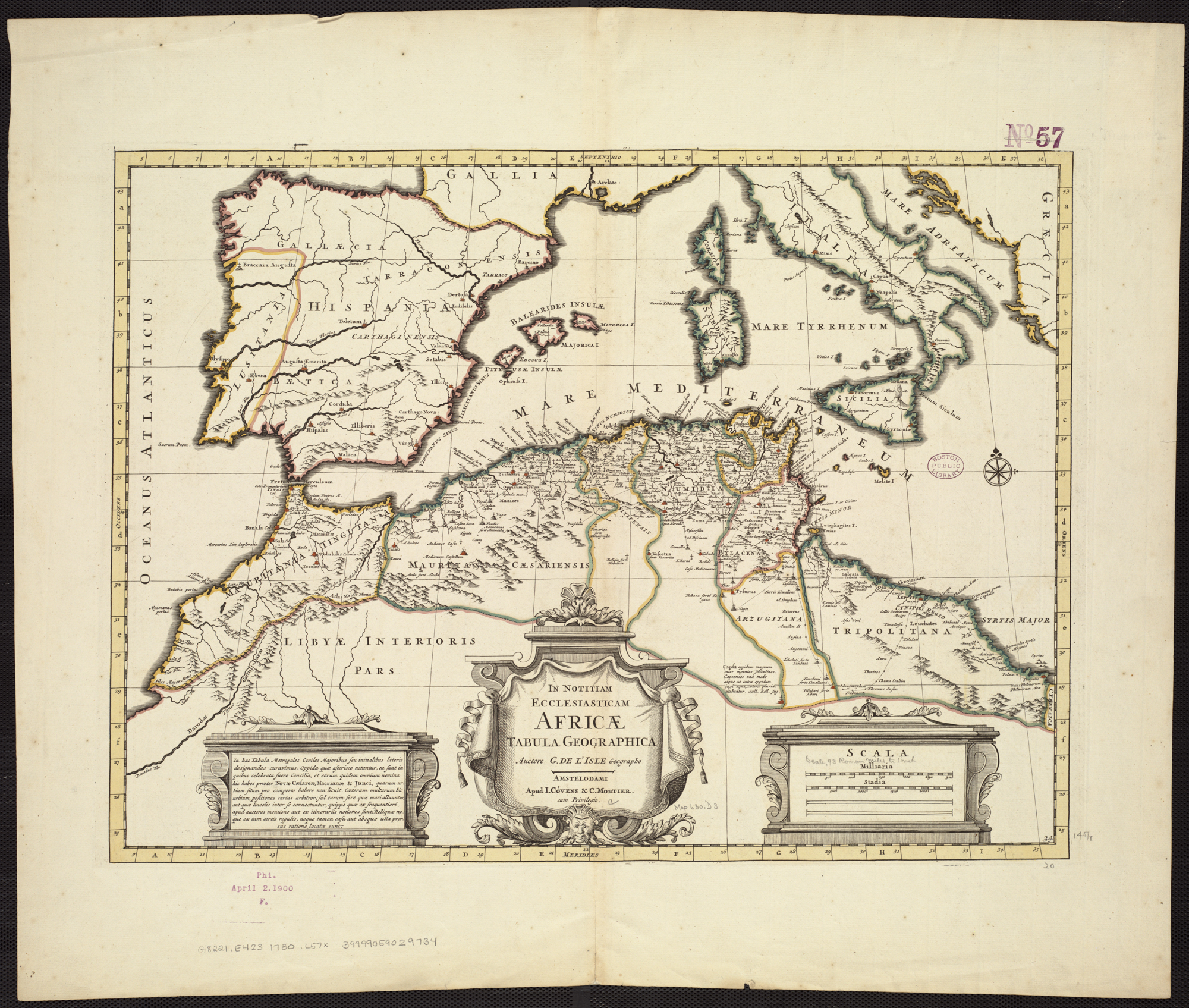
notitiam ecclesiasticam Africæ tabula geographica

The Diocese of Dices, is a titular see of the Roman Catholic Church. The location of the seat of the diocese is unknown for certain, but is perhaps identifiable with Henchir-Sidi-Salah, Tunisia. Henchir-Sidi-Salah was an ancient diocese in the Roman-Berber province of Byzacena.

There are two bishops documented in antiquity as being bishops of Dices.

- The Catholic, Massimino who attended the Council of Carthage (411) (There appears to have been at that time no Donatist bishops in Dices.)
- Candido who participated in the Council of Carthage (641).

Dices is now a titular bishopric of the Roman Catholic Church. The current bishop is Henryk Ciereszko, of Białystok.
