= Cathedral Basilica of the Assumption of the Blessed Virgin Mary, Pinsk =

Coordinates: 52.1078°N 26.0950°E

Cathedral Basilica of the Assumption of the Blessed Virgin Mary
- Катэдральны Унебаўзяцця Найсвяцейшай Панны Марыі
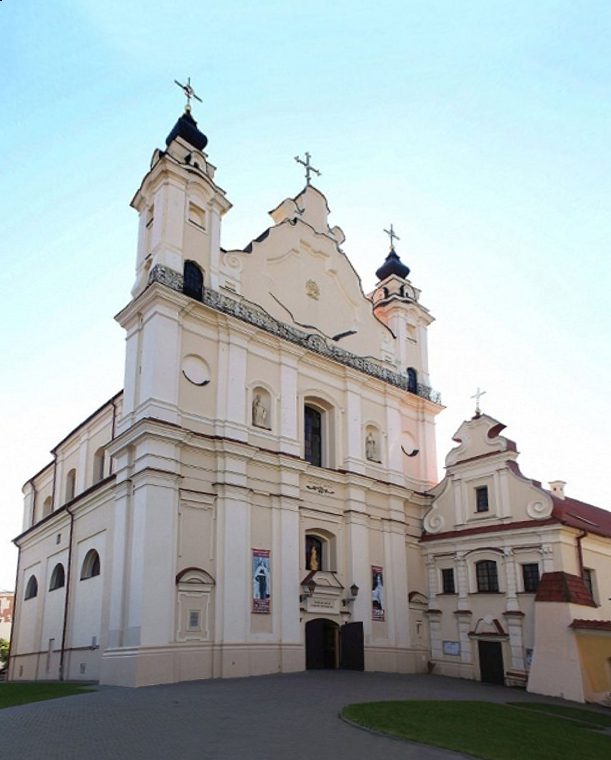
- Cathedral Basilica of the Assumption of the Blessed Virgin Mary
- Location: Pinsk, Lenina str., 18
- Country: Belarus
- Denomination: Roman Catholic Church

Architecture
- Architectural type: Baroque
- Completed: 1706-1730

The Cathedral Basilica of the Assumption of the Blessed Virgin Mary (Belarusian: катэдральны Унебаўзяцця Найсвяцейшай Панны Марыі, Polish: Bazylika katedralna Wniebowzięcia Najświętszej Maryi Panny) also called Pinsk Cathedral, is an eighteenth-century Catholic Baroque-style temple in Pinsk, Belarus.

== History ==
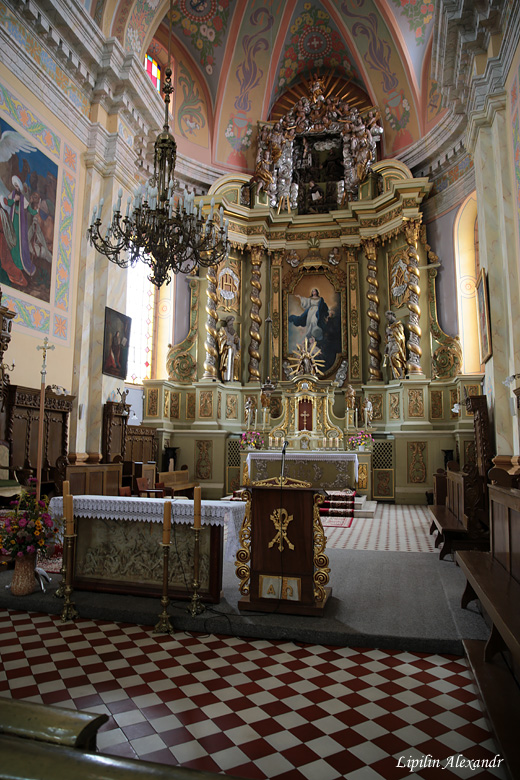
The main apse, 2013

The first wooden Franciscan monastery and church in Pinsk were founded in 1396 by Duke Sigismund Kęstutaitis. In 1510 the church was rebuilt in stone. In 1648 they were damaged during the Khmelnytsky Uprising.

The new church and the adjoining Franciscan monastery were built between 1712 and 1730 and decorated in Baroque style. The original walls of the sixteenth century church were included into new ones. The bell tower was constructed in 1817 by the architect K. Kamenskiy. In the early twentieth century the fourth level was added.

In 1836 the pipe organ built by the master Albertus Grodnitsky was installed in the church. The instrument has more than 1498 pipes and is still functional today.

In the aftermath of the January Uprising, the Franciscan monastery was closed in 1852. The church became a parish, and in 1925 became the Catholic cathedral of the Diocese of Pinsk. In 1932 the first Bishop of Pinsk, Zygmunt Łoziński, was buried in the church crypt.

Unusually for Soviet times, the church was not closed in the mid-20th century. In 1954 the future cardinal Kazimierz Świątek returned from Gulag camps and worked in the church for more than 50 years.

After the Roman Catholic Diocese of Pinsk was restored, the church became a cathedral in 1991. In 2001 the seminary was opened; its dormitories are now located in the former monastery dwelling houses. Cardinal Świątek was buried in the crypt in 2011.

The icon 'Madonna of Pinsk' painted by Alfred Romer is considered the most important relic of the church.

== Architecture ==
The cathedral has three naves and chapels and a semicircular choir, covered with a high ceiling. At the intersection of the nave with the choir is the tower with a Baroque dome. The hallways are very narrow and much lower in height than in the center. The facade is richly decorated and assumed its present form in 1766. It is a little larger than the body of the building and is divided into three levels, flanked by two square towers covered with baroque domes.

== See also ==
- Roman Catholicism in Belarus
- Cathedral Basilica of the Assumption of the Blessed Virgin Mary

== Sources ==
- Szulakowska, Urszula (2018). Renaissance and Baroque Art and Culture in the Eastern Polish-Lithuanian Commonwealth (1506-1696). Cambridge Scholar Publishing. p. 324. ISBN 978-1-5275-1135-4.
