= Wojciech Ziemba =

Polish priest (1941–2021)

- Archbishop of Warmia
- Church: Roman Catholic Church
- Archdiocese: Archdiocese of Warmia
- In office: 2006–2016
- Previous posts: Archbishop of Białystok (2000–2006); Bishop of Ełk (1992–2000); Titular bishop of Falerone (1982–1992)

Orders
- Ordination: June 18, 1967 by Józef Drzazga
- Consecration: July 4, 1982 by Józef Glemp

Personal details
- Born: October 15, 1941 Wampierzów, Debica County, Kraków District, General Government, Nazi Germany
- Died: 21 April 2021 (aged 79) Olsztyn, Poland
- Buried: Co-Cathedral Basilica of St. James in Olsztyn
- Education: Catholic University of Lublin

Wojciech Ziemba (15 October 1941 – 21 April 2021) was a Polish Roman Catholic archbishop.

Ziemba was born in Poland and was ordained to the priesthood in 1967. He served as titular bishop of Falerone and was the auxiliary bishop of the Roman Catholic Archdiocese of Warmia, Poland from 1982 to 1992. He then served as bishop of the Roman Catholic Diocese of Elk from 1992 to 2000 and as archbishop of the Roman Catholic Archdiocese of Bialystok, Poland, from 2000 to 2006 and as archbishop of the Archdiocese of Warmia from 2006 to 2016.

== Notes ==
Catholic Church titles
Preceded by Stanisław Szymecki	Archbishop of Białystok; 2000–2006	Succeeded by Edward Ozorowski
