= Diocese of Drohiczyn =

Roman Catholic diocese in Poland

Coordinates: 52°23′49″N 22°39′34″E

Diocese of Drohiczyn Dioecesis Drohiczinensis

Catholic
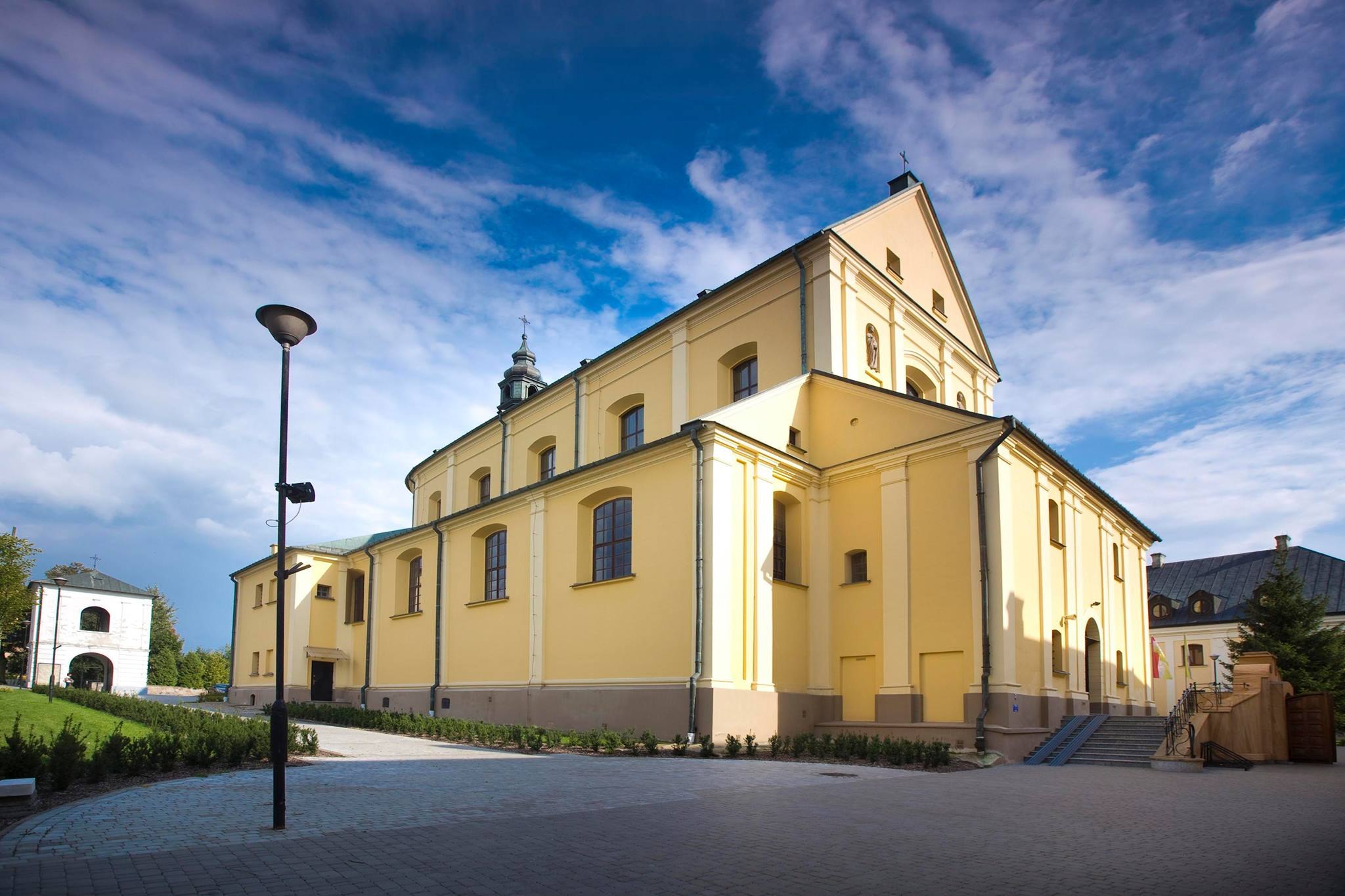
- Holy Trinity Cathedral in Drohiczyn

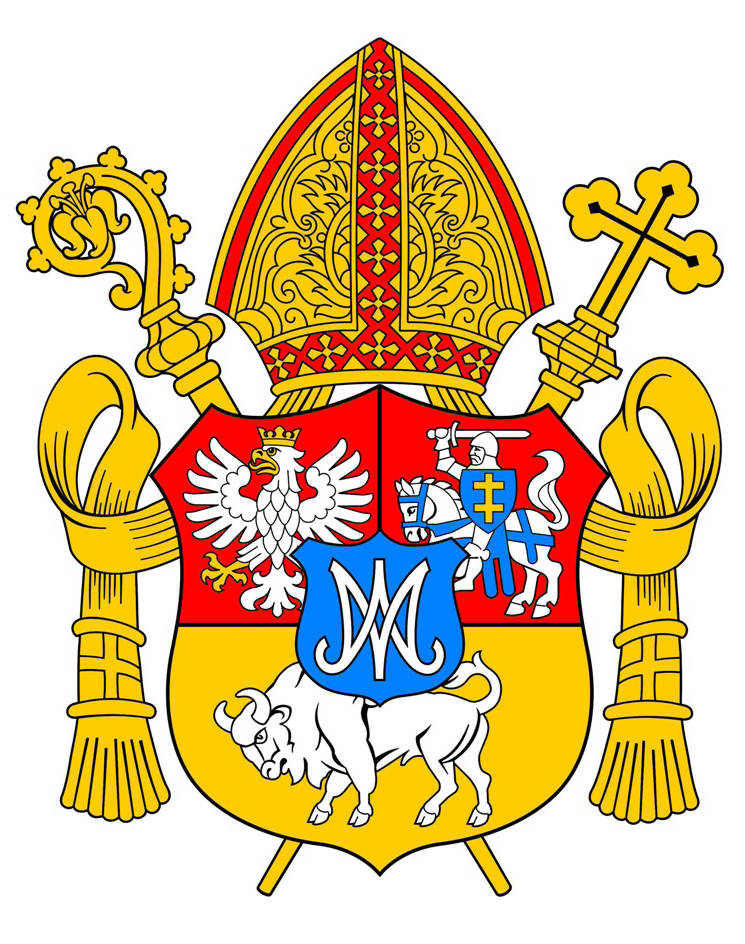
- Coat of arms

Location
- Country: Poland
- Metropolitan: Białystok

Statistics
- Area: 8,000 km^{2} (3,100 sq mi)
- Population: Total; Catholics: (as of 2023); 236,200; 178,000 (75.4%)

Information
- Rite: Latin Rite
- Established: 5 June 1991
- Cathedral: Cathedral of the Most Holy Trinity
- Co-cathedral: Co-Cathedral of the Immaculate Heart of Mary

Current leadership
- Pope: Leo XIV
- Bishop: Piotr Sawczuk
- Bishops emeritus: Tadeusz Pikus

Website
- Website of the Diocese

The Diocese of Drohiczyn (Latin: Dioecesis Drohiczinensis) is a Latin Church diocese of the Catholic Church located in the city of Drohiczyn in the ecclesiastical province of Białystok in Poland.

There are currently 249 priests in the Diocese. The most recent death of a priest was that of Antoni Pacyfik Dydycz on 14 September at age 87.

== History ==
- June 5, 1991: Established as Diocese of Drohiczyn from the Diocese of Pinsk in Belarus

== Special churches ==
- Cathedral:
  - Cathedral of the Most Holy Trinity
  - Co-Cathedral of the Immaculate Heart of Mary
- Minor Basilicas:
  - Basilica of the Nativity of the Blessed Virgin Mary and St. Nicholas
  - Basilica of the Assumption of the Blessed Virgin Mary

== Leadership ==
Bishops of Drohiczyn

  - Bishop Władysław Jędruszuk (1991.06.05 – 1994.05.25)
  - Bishop Antoni Pacyfik Dydycz, OFMCap (1994.06.20 – 2014.03.29)
  - Bishop Tadeusz Pikus (2014.05.25 – 2019.07.20)
  - Bishop Piotr Sawczuk (from 2019.07.20)

== See also ==
- Roman Catholicism in Poland

== Sources ==
- GCatholic.org
- Catholic Hierarchy
- Diocese website
