= Zabiele, Mońki County =

Zabiele
- Village
- Location within Poland
- Coordinates: 53°33′51″N 22°57′58″E
- Country: Poland
- Voivodeship: Podlaskie
- County: Mońki
- Gmina: Jaświły

Zabiele [zaˈbjɛlɛ] is a village in the administrative district of Gmina Jaświły, within Mońki County, Podlaskie Voivodeship, in north-eastern Poland.

== Notable people ==
- Tadeusz Pikus (born 1949), Bishop of Warsaw
