= Andrei Znoska =

Belarusian Roman Catholic bishop (born 1980)

The Right Reverend Andrei Znoska
- Auxiliary Bishop of Pinsk
- Church: Roman Catholic Church
- Appointed: 19 July 2024
- Other post: Titular Bishop of Scardona

Orders
- Ordination: 28 May 2005 by Aleksander Kaszkiewicz
- Consecration: 7 September 2024 by Ante Jozić; Antoni Dziemianko; Iosif Staneuski

Personal details
- Born: Andrej Časlavavič Znoska; 20 June 1980 (age 46) Byarozawka, Byelorussian SSR
- Residence: Pinsk, Belarus
- Education: Belarusian State University, Cardinal Stefan Wyszyński University in Warsaw
- Motto: Salus animarum suprema lex
- Coat of arms

Andrei Znoska (Belarusian: Андрэй Часлававіч Зноска; born 20 June 1980) is a Belarusian Roman Catholic prelate. He has been the auxiliary bishop of the Diocese of Pinsk and titular bishop of Scardona since 2024.

== Early life and education ==
Andrei Znoska was born on 20 June 1980, in Byarozawka, Grodno Region. He entered the Major Seminary in Grodno in the late 1990s and was ordained a priest for the Diocese of Grodno on 28 May 2005.

Znoska pursued further studies in law, graduating from the Belarusian State University in Minsk in 2012. He later specialized in canon law at the Cardinal Stefan Wyszyński University in Warsaw, where he earned a licentiate in 2018.

== Priesthood ==
Znoska served as a curate at the Cathedral of St. Francis Xavier in Grodno from 2005 to 2007. In 2012, he was appointed pastor of the Parish of Divine Mercy in Lida. Within the Grodno Diocese, he served as a judge for the ecclesiastical tribunal and became a professor of canon law at the diocesan seminary in 2018.

In July 2023, while serving as pastor in Lida, Znoska was reportedly detained by Belarusian authorities as part of a wider crackdown on Catholic clergy in the country.

== Episcopate ==
On 19 July 2024, Pope Francis appointed Znoska as the auxiliary bishop of the Diocese of Pinsk. At the time of his appointment, he was recognized as one of the younger members of the Belarusian episcopate. He was consecrated on 7 September 2024 by Archbishop Ante Jozić, the Apostolic Nuncio to Belarus, with Bishop Antoni Dziemianko and Archbishop Iosif Staneuski serving as co-consecrators.
