= Serpelice =

- Village
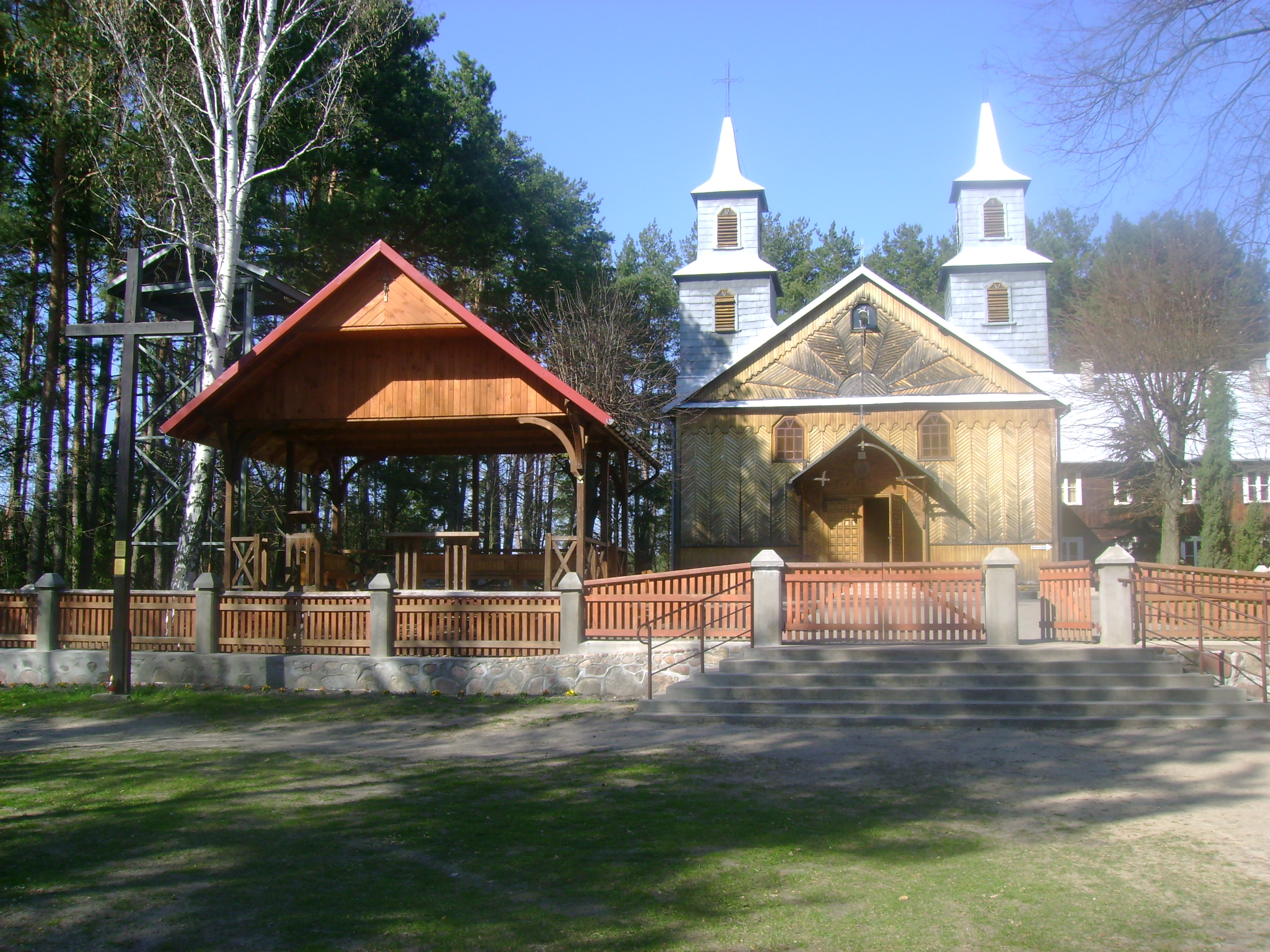
- Wooden St. Paul's church,

- Location within Poland
- Coordinates: 52°17′N 23°3′E
- Country: Poland
- Voivodeship: Masovian
- County: Łosice
- Gmina: Sarnaki

Serpelice [sɛrpɛˈlit͡sɛ] is a village in the administrative district of Gmina Sarnaki, within Łosice County, Masovian Voivodeship, in east-central Poland.

The well known person who comes from Serpelice is Bishop Antoni Pacyfik Dydycz.

The village has a wooden church, built in 1947, by the Order of Friars Minor Capuchin, who also have a monastery in the village.
