= Stanisław Szymecki =

Polish Roman Catholic archbishop (1924–2023)

His Excellency Stanisław Szymecki
- Archbishop Emeritus of Białystok
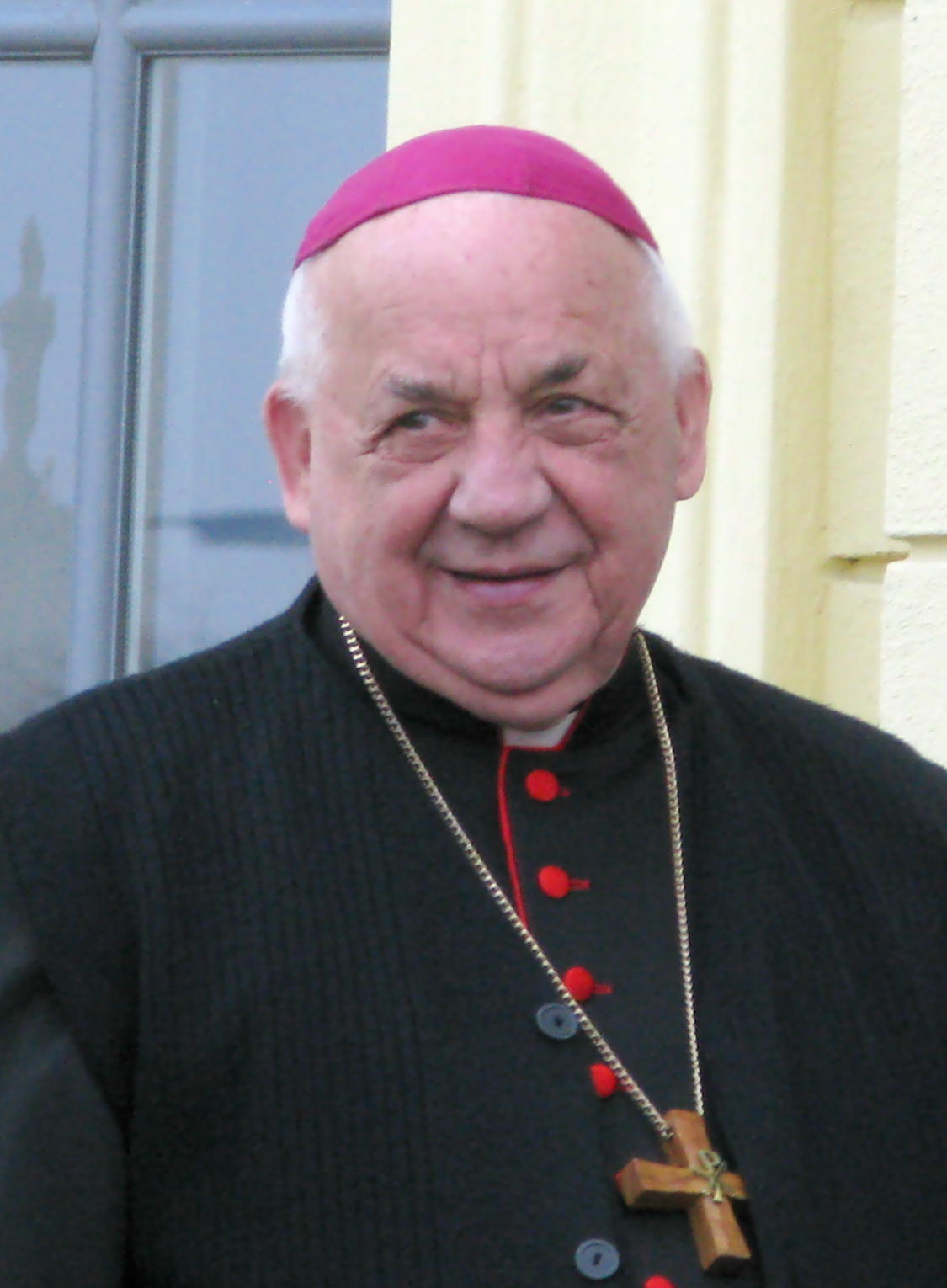
- Appointed: 15 May 1993
- Term ended: 16 November 2000
- Predecessor: Edward Kisiel
- Successor: Wojciech Ziemba
- Previous post: Bishop of Kielce (1981–1993)

Orders
- Ordination: 3 July 1947 by Emmanuel Célestin Suhard
- Consecration: 12 April 1981 by John Paul II

Personal details
- Born: 26 January 1924 Katowice, Poland
- Died: 26 September 2023 (aged 99) Białystok, Poland
- Coat of arms

Stanisław Szymecki (26 January 1924 – 26 September 2023) was a Polish prelate of the Roman Catholic Church.

== Biography ==
Szymecki was born in Katowice and was ordained a priest on 3 July 1947. Szymecki was appointed bishop of the Diocese of Kielce on 27 March 1981 and consecrated on 12 April 1981. Szymecki was appointed to the Archbishop of Białystok on 15 May 1993 and retired from the diocese on 16 November 2000. Szymecki died in Białystok on 26 September 2023, at the age of 99.

Catholic Church titles
Preceded by Edward Kisiel	Archbishop of Białystok; 1993–2000	Succeeded by Wojciech Ziemba
Preceded by Jan Jaroszewicz	Bishop of Kielce; 1981–1993	Succeeded by Kazimierz Ryczan
