= Zygmunt Łoziński =

Polish Roman Catholic bishop

Venerable Bishop Zygmunt Łoziński
- Bishop of Minsk and Pińsk
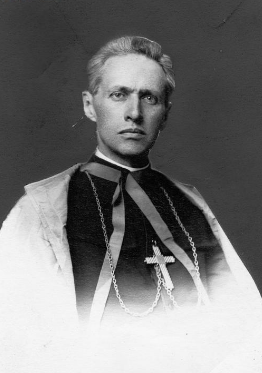
- Church: Roman Catholic Church
- Archdiocese: Minsk and Pinsk
- See: Minsk and Pinsk
- Appointed: 2 November 1917
- Term ended: 26 March 1932
- Predecessor: Adamus Wojtkiewicz
- Successor: Kazimierz Bukraba

Orders
- Ordination: 23 June 1895
- Consecration: 28 July 1918 by Aleksander Kakowski
- Rank: Bishop

Personal details
- Born: Zygmunt Łoziński; 5 June 1870 Baratin, Minsk Governorate, Russian Empire
- Died: 26 March 1932 (aged 61) Pińsk, Polesie Voivodeship, Second Polish Republic

Sainthood
- Venerated in: Roman Catholic Church
- Title as Saint: Venerable
- Attributes: Bishop's attire

Zygmunt Łoziński (5 June 1870 – 26 March 1932) was a Polish Roman Catholic bishop who served as the Bishop of Minsk (1917–1925) and later as the first Bishop of Pinsk. Soviet authorities arrested him on two occasions during his episcopate.

The title of Venerable was conferred upon him on 2 April 1993 after Pope John Paul II acknowledged his heroic virtue.

== Life ==
Zygmunt Łoziński was born on 5 June 1870 in a village of Baratin in the Novogrudsky Uyezd of the Minsk Governorate of the Russian Empire (present-day Karelichy District, Belarus).

He studied in Warsaw and in Saint Petersburg, where he graduated from the Saint Petersburg Roman Catholic Theological Academy before starting his studies for the priesthood; he was ordained to the priesthood on 23 June 1895. On 17 November 1898, Russian authorities sentenced him to three years of seclusion in a Latvian convent. Łoziński became the vicar of Smolensk in 1901 as well as being reassigned to Tula in 1902 and Riga in 1904. Łoziński became the rector of the Minsk Cathedral in 1905. In 1906 he returned to Saint Petersburg where he taught Hebrew and biblical studies. He accompanied the Archbishop of Mogilev to visit the parishes of the Russian Empire from 1909 until 1911. In 1912 he started to commence further education in the German Empire and in Rome.

Pope Benedict XV appointed him as the Bishop of Minsk on 2 November 1917 and as such he received his episcopal consecration on 28 July 1918 in Warsaw from Cardinal Aleksander Kakowski - the co-consecrators were Stanisław Kazimierz and Blessed Antoni Julian Nowowiejski. Soviet authorities arrested him on 1 August 1920 on the charges of "counter-revolution" but the pressure of local Christians saw him released on the following 11 August. He was arrested again on 4 September 1920 while the Polish government secured his release eleven months later in 1921 from Butyrka Prison; he weighed 95 pounds upon his release. Pope Pius XI appointed him on 28 October 1925 as the Bishop of Pińsk after his previous diocese was aggregated to the latter.

He filed a total of 755 lawsuits as part of the recovery of Orthodox Churches in Poland. In 1929 he invited the Blessed Martyrs of Nowogródek of the Sisters of the Holy Family of Nazareth to Navahrudak in 1929. Łoziński was awarded both the Order of the White Eagle (Poland) and the Cross of Valour (Poland).

Łoziński died on 26 March 1932.

== Beatification process ==
Order of the White Eagle.

Cross of Valour.

The beatification process commenced on two fronts in both Pinsk and Vatican. The informative process opened in 1957 and concluded its business of collating testimonies and documentation in 1962. This occurred despite the fact that the title of Servant of God - the first official stage in the process - was not conferred to him until 4 December 1980 after which point an apostolic process was held. After this the Congregation for the Causes of Saints validated the previous processes.

The C.C.S. received the Positio in 1990 at which point theologians approved the cause on 10 December 1992 while the C.C.S. also approved it on 9 March 1993. He was declared to be Venerable on 2 April 1993 after Pope John Paul II approved that the late bishop lived a life of heroic virtue.
