= Edward Ozorowski =

Polish Roman Catholic archbishop (1941–2024)

His Excellency Edward Ozorowski
- Archbishop Emeritus of Białystok
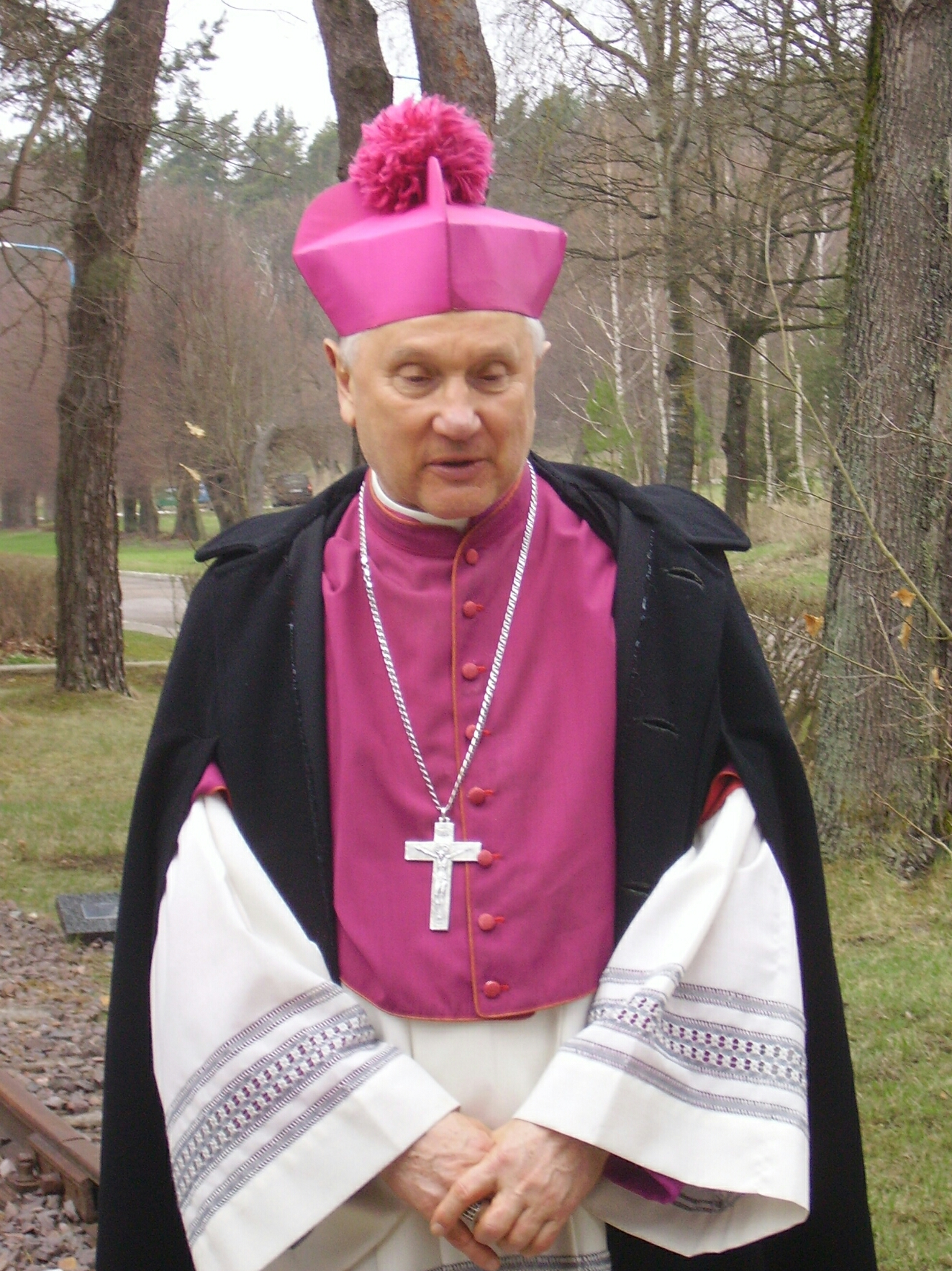
- Ozorowski in 2012
- Archdiocese: Białystok
- Appointed: 21 October 2006
- Term ended: 12 April 2017
- Predecessor: Wojciech Ziemba
- Successor: Tadeusz Wojda
- Previous posts: Auxiliary Bishop of Vilnius (1979–1991); Titular Bishop of Bitettum (1979–2006); Auxiliary Bishop of Białystok (1991–2006)

Orders
- Ordination: 21 June 1964 by Władysław Suszyński
- Consecration: 29 April 1979 by Henryk Gulbinowicz

Personal details
- Born: 1 May 1941 Wólka-Przedmieście, Belastok Region, Byelorussian SSR, USSR
- Died: 12 October 2024 (aged 83) Białystok, Poland

Edward Ozorowski (1 May 1941 – 12 October 2024) was a Polish Roman Catholic prelate. He served as the Auxiliary bishop in Białystok from 1979 to 2006. Ozorowski then served as the Metropolitan bishop in Białystok from 2006 to 2017.

Ozorowski was awarded Honorary citizenship of Wasilków in 2007. He was also honored by Białystok in 2014 and received the Minister of National Education award.

Ozorowski died on 12 October 2024, at the age of 83.

Catholic Church titles
Preceded by Wojciech Ziemba	Archbishop of Białystok; 2006–2017	Succeeded by Tadeusz Wojda
Preceded by —	Auxiliary Bishop of Białystok; 1991–2006	Succeeded by —
Preceded by Benedito de Ulhôa Vieira	Titular Bishop of Bitettum; 1979–2006	Succeeded by Leo Boccardi
Preceded by —	Auxiliary Bishop of Vilnius; 1979–1991	Succeeded by —
