= Edward Kisiel =

Polish Roman Catholic bishop

- Archbishop of Białystok
- Appointed: 25 March 1992
- Previous posts: Bishop of Białystok (1991 – 1992); Apostolic administrator of Białystok (1976 – 1991); Titular bishop of Limata (1976 – 1992)

Orders
- Ordination: 14 February 1943 by Kazimierz Bukraba
- Consecration: 27 June 1976 by Stefan Wyszyński

Personal details
- Born: 24 February 1918 Yundelovo
- Died: 28 September 1993 (aged 75) Białystok
- Motto: Evangelizare misit me

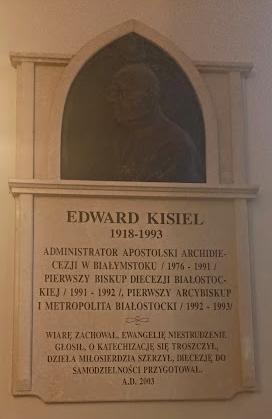
A plaque commemorating Edward Kisiel

Edward Kisiel (24 February 1918 – 28 September 1993) was an archbishop of the Archdiocese of Białystok.

== Biography ==
Kisiel was born in 1918 in Jundziłowo to Franciszek and Aniela (née Łowiec) Kisiel; he was baptized on 3 March. He attended gymnasiums in Dzisna and Pinsk, graduating from the latter in 1937. Afterwards, he began attending the seminary in Vilnius. He was ordained a deacon in 1941 and was ordained a priest on 14 February 1943 by Kazimierz Bukraba, bishop of Pinsk.

In 1950, Kisiel began studying dogmatic theology at the University of Warsaw; he obtained a doctorate in January 1953 with the thesis Wartości społeczne Wcielenia według św. Hilarego z Poitiers. On 15 January 1976, Kisiel was made chancellor of the diocesan curia. He was appointed apostolic administrator of Białystok (the polish part of the Archdiocese of Vilnius) and titular bishop of Limaty on 3 May 1976; he was consecrated on 27 June by Stefan Wyszyński.

On 5 June 1991, Kisiel was made bishop of the new Diocese of Białystok. On 25 March 1992 - with the promulgation of the papal bull Totus Tuus Poloniae populus - he was made archbishop of Białystok. He received his pallium at the Vatican on 29 June 1992. He resigned from the archdiocese on 15 May 1993 and died on 28 November; he was buried at the Białystok Cathedral.
