= Martyrs of Nowogródek =

Roman Catholic martyrs

Blesseds Martyrs of Nowogródek
- The Eleven Nuns of Nowogródek by Adam Styka
- Born: 1888–1916
- Died: 1 August 1943, Novogrudok, Generalbezirk Weissruthenien, Reichskommissariat Ostland
- Martyred by: The Nazi Gestapo during The Holocaust
- Means of martyrdom: Execution by firing squad
- Venerated in: Catholic Church
- Beatified: 5 March 2000, Vatican City, by Pope John Paul II
- Feast: 1 August

The Blessed Martyrs of Nowogródek, the Eleven Nuns of Nowogródek or Blessed Mary Stella and her Ten Companions, were a group of Sisters of the Holy Family of Nazareth executed by the Gestapo in August 1943 in occupied Poland (present-day Novogrudok, Belarus). They were beatified as martyrs by Pope John Paul II on 5 March 2000.

== Background ==
The Sisters of the Holy Family of Nazareth had arrived in Nowogródek, then part of the Second Polish Republic, in 1929 at the request of Zygmunt Łoziński, the Bishop of Pinsk. The Sisters became an integral part of the life of the town. In 1939, Nowogródek, located at that time in the Kresy-part of interwar Poland (nowadays central Belarus), was annexed by the Soviet Union and incorporated into the Byelorussian Soviet Socialist Republic. In 1941, the town was occupied by the German army as part of the Operation Barbarossa.

During the Nazi and Soviet occupations of Nowogródek, the Sisters invested great effort in preparing the residents of the town for religious services – as liturgical prayer became a beacon of hope amid the hopelessness of the occupation.

The Nazi terror in Nowogródek began in 1942 with the extermination of the town's Jewish population as part of Operation Reinhard. Of the town's pre-war population of 20,000, approximately half were Jews. The Germans murdered about 9,500 of the Jews in a series of "actions" and sent the remaining 550 Jews to slave labor camps. This was followed by a surge in Polish arrests, then the slaughter of 60 people, including two Catholic priests. This situation was repeated on 18 July 1943, when more than 120 people were arrested and slated for execution.

The women of the town turned to the Sisters to pray for the prisoners' release. After discussing the matter, the Sisters unanimously expressed their desire to offer their lives in sacrifice for the prisoners. The Superior of the community, Sister Maria Stella, C.S.F.N., shared the Sisters' decision with their local pastor, Father Zienkiewicz, telling him: "My God, if sacrifice of life is needed, accept it from us and spare those who have families. We are even praying for this intention." Almost immediately, the plans for the prisoners were changed to deportation to work camps in Germany, with some of them even being released. When the life of Zienkiewicz was threatened, the Sisters renewed their offer, saying, "There is a greater need for a priest on this earth than for us. We pray that God will take us in his place, if sacrifice of life is needed."

=== Execution ===
Without warning or provocation, on 31 July 1943, the community was summoned by the local Gestapo commander to report to the local police station, where they were held overnight. The next morning, 1 August 1943, they were loaded into a van and driven beyond the town limits. At a secluded spot in the woods about five kilometres (three miles) from the town, the eleven women were machine gunned to death and buried in a common grave. Before reporting to the police station, Sister Stella had asked one member of the community, Sister M. Malgorzata Banas, C.S.F.N., who worked as a nurse in the local public hospital, to stay behind at the convent, whatever happened, to take care of the church and their pastor. She was the best candidate for that among the community as she wore civilian clothing due to her job. It was days before she and the townspeople knew that the Sisters had been killed. Eventually, Banas located their grave, quietly tending to it and the parish church during the war years and during the post-war Soviet occupation, until her death in 1966. The Church of the Transfiguration, known as Biała Fara (or White Church), now contains the remains of the eleven Sisters.

== Martyrs ==
The eleven murdered Sisters are listed below, along with their birth names, dates of birth, and ages at the time of their deaths.

Religious Name	Birth Name	Birth Date	Age at Death
Sister M. Stella of the Blessed Sacrament, C.S.F.N., Superior	Adelaide Mardosewicz	14 Dec 1888	54 years old
Sister M. Imelda of the Eucharistic Jesus, C.S.F.N.	Jadwiga Karolina Żak	29 Dec 1892	50 years old
Sister M. Rajmunda of Jesus, C.S.F.N.	Anna Kukołowicz	24 Aug 1892	50 years old
Sister M. Daniela of Jesus, C.S.F.N.	Eleonora Aniela Jóźwik	25 Jan 1895	48 years old
Sister M. Kanuta of the Agonized Jesus in the Garden, C.S.F.N.	Józefa Chrobot	22 May 1896	47 years old
Sister M. Gwidona of Divine Mercy, C.S.F.N.	Helena Cierpka	11 Apr 1900	43 years old
Sister M. Sergia of Our Lady of Sorrows, C.S.F.N.	Julia Rapiej	18 Aug 1900	42 years old
Sister M. Kanizja, C.S.F.N.	Eugenia Mackiewicz	27 Nov 1903	39 years old
Sister M. Felicyta, C.S.F.N.	Paulina Borowik	30 Aug 1905	37 years old
Sister M. Heliodora, C.S.F.N.	Leokadia Matuszewska	8 Feb 1906	37 years old
Sister M. Boromea, C.S.F.N.	Veronika Narmontowicz	18 Dec 1916	26 years old

== Veneration ==
The beatification process for the eleven Religious Sisters was officially opened on 18 September 1991, and, on 28 June 1999, it was announced by the Congregation for the Causes of Saints of the Holy See that Pope John Paul II had confirmed that they were martyrs, having died for others in the name of the Catholic faith. Pope John Paul formally beatified them, along with a group of thirty-three others, on 5 March 2000.

== See also ==
- 108 Martyrs of World War II
