= Osiedle Dziesięciny I, Białystok =

Dziesięciny I
- District (osiedle) of Białystok
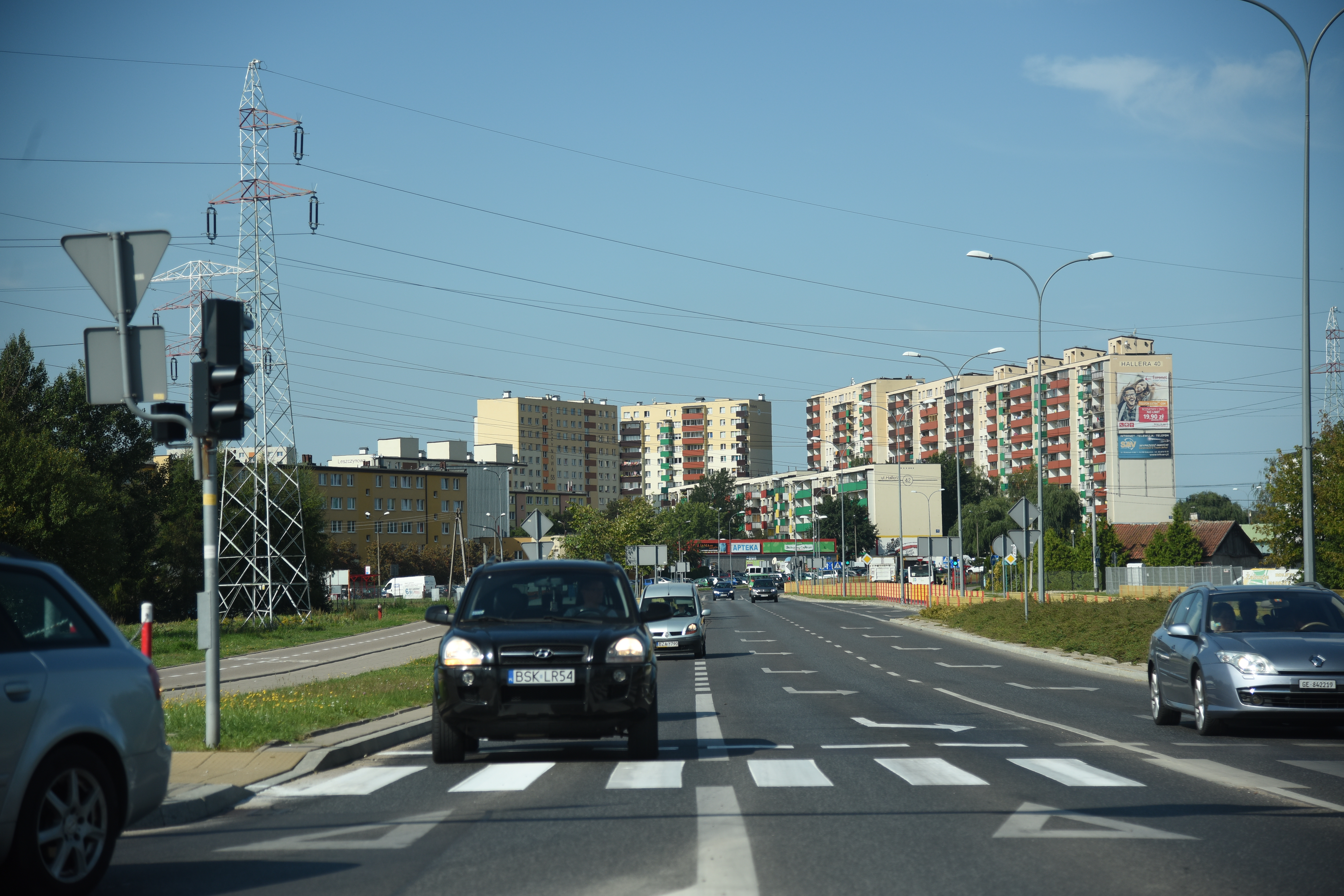

- Location of Dziesięciny I District within Białystok
- Coordinates: 53°09′16″N 23°08′06″E
- Country: Poland
- Voivodeship: Podlaskie
- City: Białystok

Area
  - Total: 1.145 km^{2} (0.442 sq mi)

Dziesięciny I is one of the districts of the Polish city of Białystok.

The estate stretches from Oliwkowa Street along Gen. St. Maczek Street to the railroad tracks, along the tracks to the Biała River, along the Biała River to Antoniuk Fabryczny Street, Antoniuk Fabryczny Street to Gen. Józef Haller Street, Gen. Józef Haller Street to Palmowa, Palmowa, Oliwkowa to Gen. St. Maczek Street.

== History ==
Construction of the 'Dziesięciny' estate began by "Rodzina Kolejowa" Housing Association, where the first building completed in 1977 and the end of December 1985. the housing resources of the estate consisted of 27 buildings with a total of 2,190 apartments. In September 2015 an archeological find was made in that district which contained graves of 22 human skeletons with rings on the finger bones and coins from 1666, in a depth of one meter. That happened during a construction of a parking lot near the intersection of Hallera street and Antoniuk Fabryczny.
