= Hermanówka =

- Village
- Location within Poland
- Coordinates: 53°2′N 23°10′E
- Country: Poland
- Voivodeship: Podlaskie
- County: Białystok
- Gmina: Juchnowiec Kościelny

Hermanówka [xɛrmaˈnufka] is a village in the administrative district of Gmina Juchnowiec Kościelny, within Białystok County, Podlaskie Voivodeship, in north-eastern Poland.
