= Puczyce =

- Village
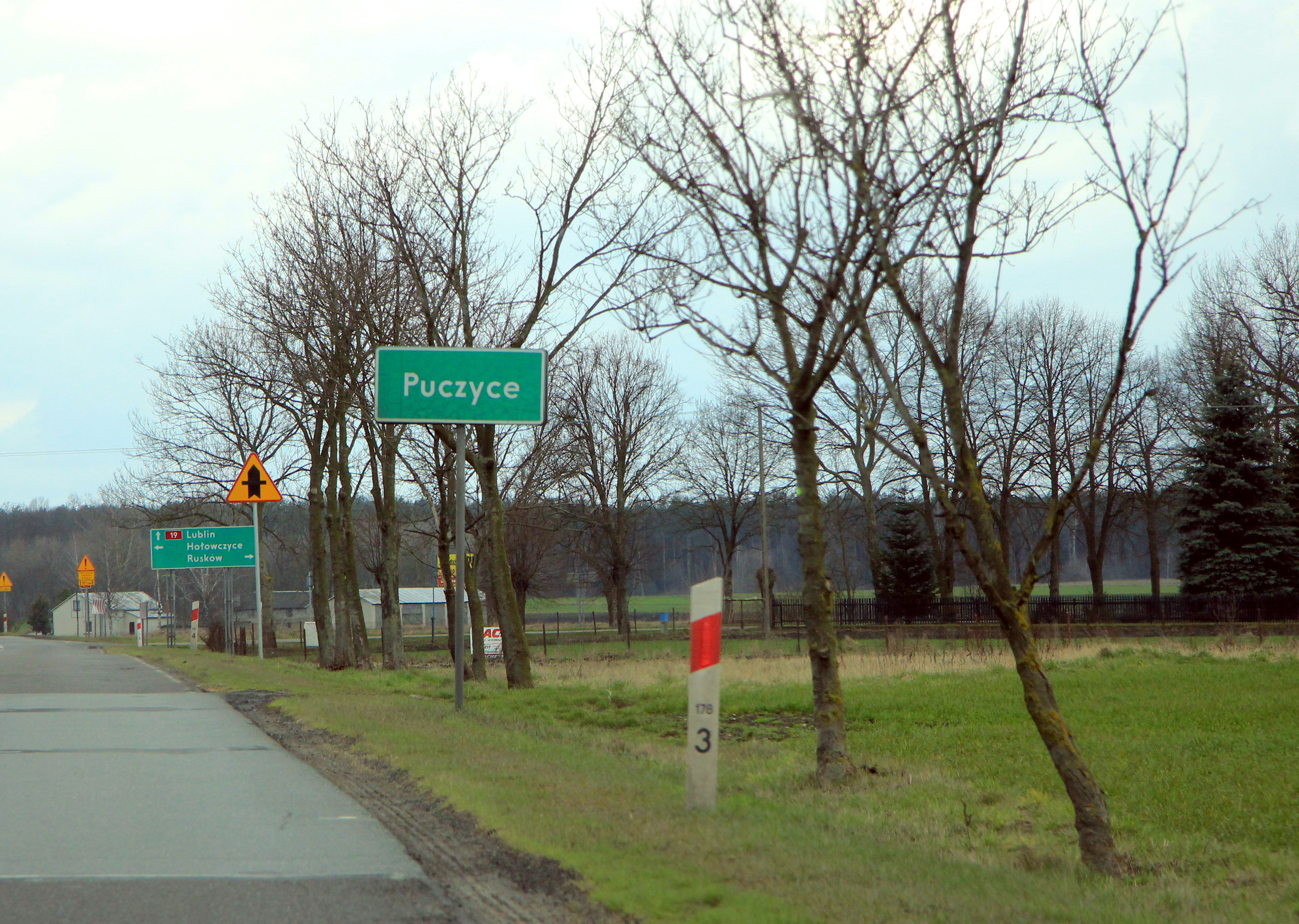

- Location within Poland
- Coordinates: 52°16′N 22°48′E
- Country: Poland
- Voivodeship: Masovian
- County: Łosice
- Gmina: Platerów

Puczyce [puˈt͡ʂɨt͡sɛ] is a village in the administrative district of Gmina Platerów, within Łosice County, Masovian Voivodeship, in east-central Poland.
