= Henchir-Sidi-Salah =

Archaeological site in Tunisia

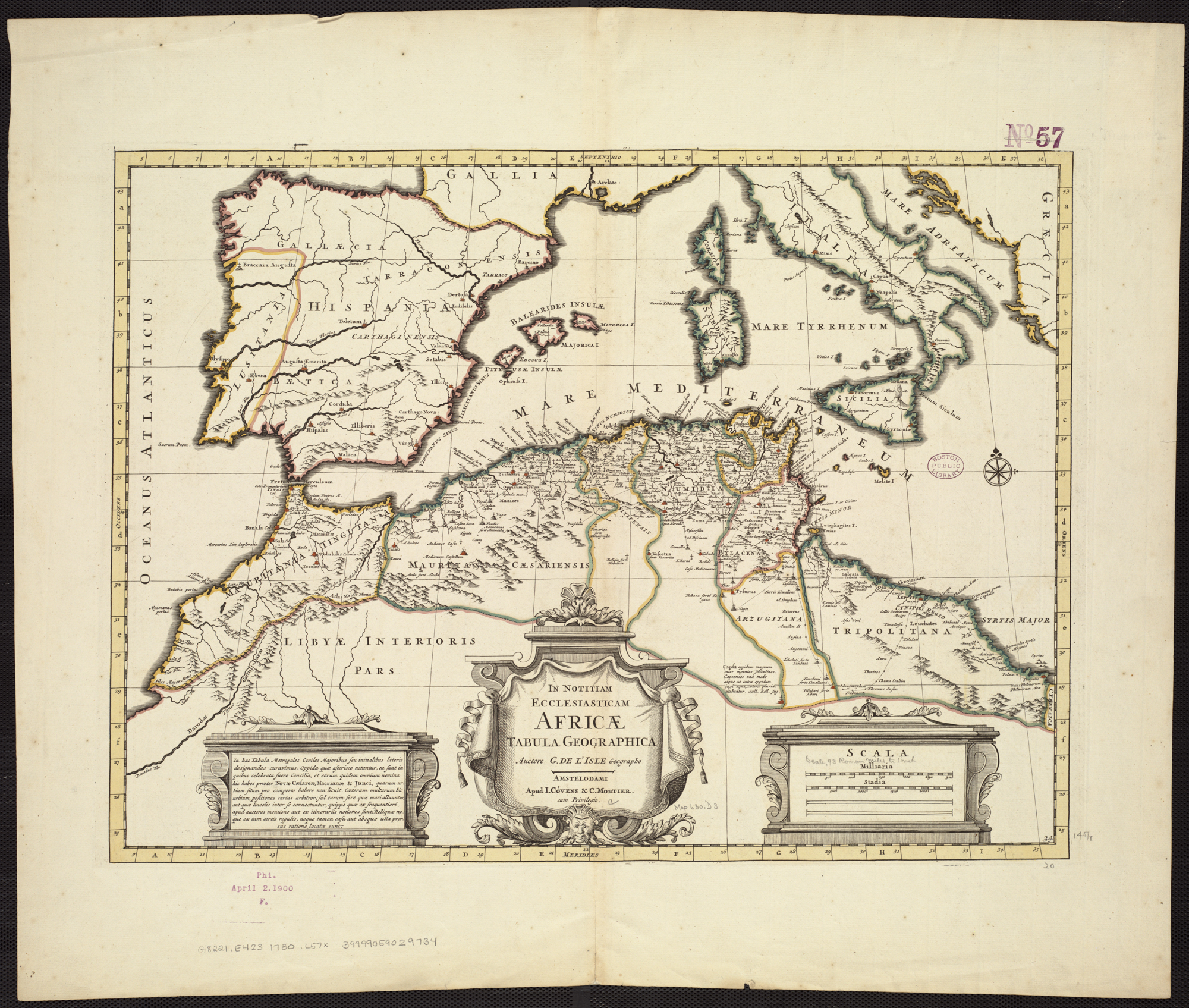
In notitiam ecclesiasticam Africæ tabula geographica

Henchir-Sidi-Salah is a rural locality and archaeological site in the hinterland behind Sfax, Tunisia.

Located at latitude:35°56'18"N, longitude10°8'51"E, Henchir Sidi Salah is close to Ait and Teniour, and Medass Sidi Salah, on the Oued Sidi Salah and near the ruins of Henchir Bou Gherara. The elevation above sea level is 50 metres (160 ft).

The ruins that dot the landscape at Sidi Salah are the remains of a fundus (farm or estate) of the Roman province of Byzacena (North Africa). Inscriptions give the name of the Roman settlement as Fundus [...]itanus assumed to be Fundus (Dic)itanus, though Fundus Tigitanus is also possible. The town flourished from 30 BC to AD 640.

Based on the name "Fundus Dicitanus", it is tentatively proposed that the village/town was the seat of the ancient Christian bishopric of Dices (or Dicensis) which is a home suppressed and titular see of the Roman Catholic Church.
