= Sidi Salah Bou Kabrine Mosque =

Former mosque in Tunis, Tunisia

- مسجد سيدي صالح بو قبرين

Religion
- Affiliation: Sunni Islam

Location
- Location: Tunis, Tunisia

Architecture
- Type: Mosque

Sidi Salah Bou Kabrine Mosque (Arabic: مسجد سيدي صالح بو قبرين) was a Tunisian mosque located in the northern suburb of the medina of Tunis. It does not exist anymore.

== Localization ==
The mosque was located on Sidi Aloui Street.

== Etymology ==
It got its name from a saint, Sidi Salah Bou Kabrine, whose tomb is between Bizerte and Mateur.

== History ==
It got destroyed after the replanning of the Sidi Aloui Street.
