= Białystok Cathedral =

Cathedral Basilica of the Assumption of the Blessed Virgin Mary
- Bazylika archikatedralna Wniebowzięcia Najświętszej Maryi Panny w Białymstoku
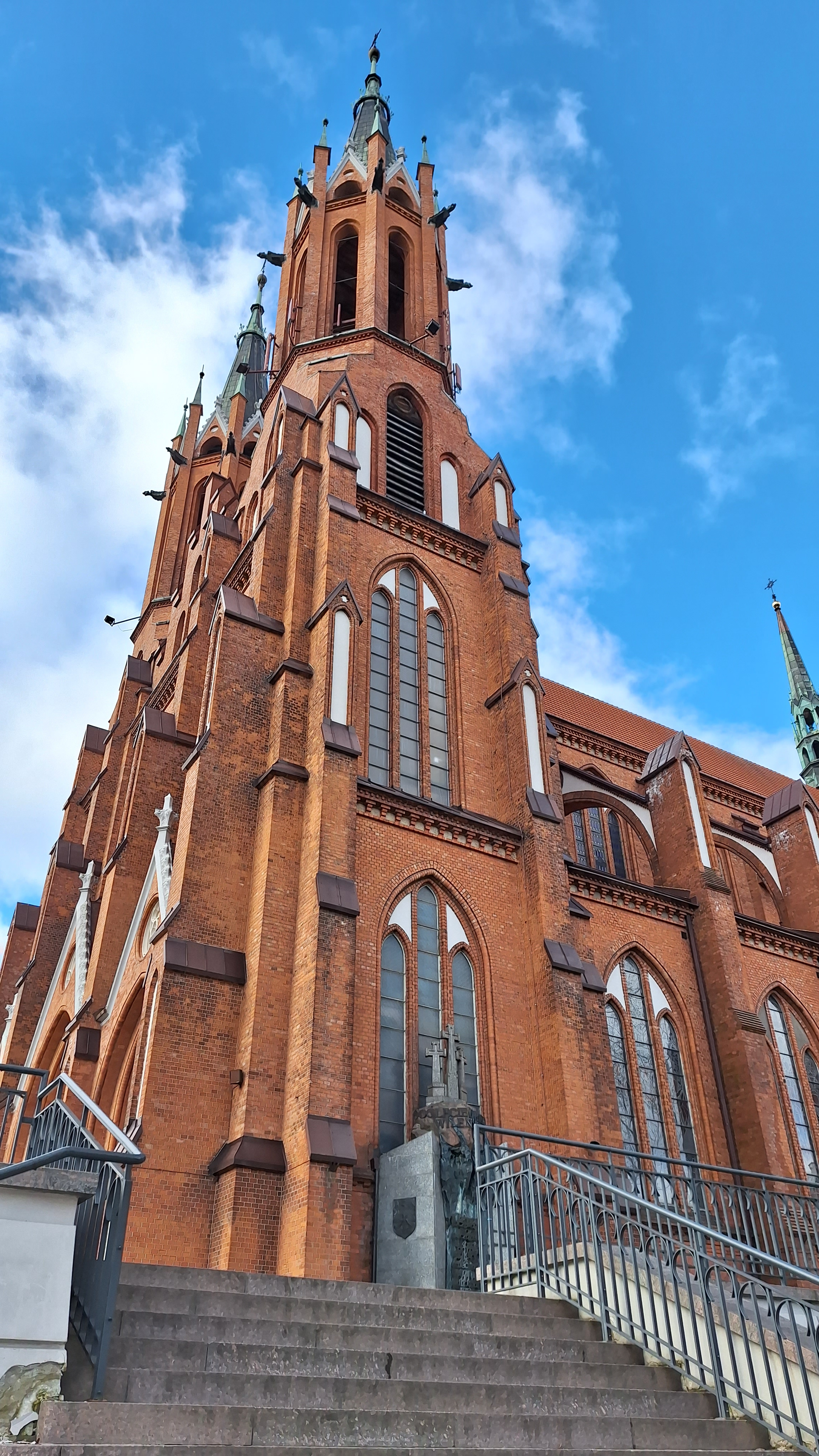
- Cathedral Basilica of the Assumption of the Blessed Virgin Mary
- 53.1325°N 23.1627°E
- Location: 2 Kościelna Street, Białystok
- Country: Poland
- Denomination: Roman Catholic Church

History
- Dedication: The Most Holy Virgin Mary, Queen of Poland

Architecture
- Architectural type: Neo-Gothic
- Completed: 1905

The Cathedral Basilica of the Assumption of the Blessed Virgin Mary (Polish: Bazylika archikatedralna Wniebowzięcia Najświętszej Maryi Panny w Białymstoku) also called Białystok Cathedral, is a Roman Catholic cathedral in Białystok in Poland. It was designed by architect Józef Pius Dziekoński. The three-nave church is 90 meters long and can accommodate 9,500 worshipers. The two towers reach 72.5 meters high. It is the main church of the Archdiocese of Białystok and acquired the status of basílica in 1985 by decision of Pope John Paul II.

== History ==
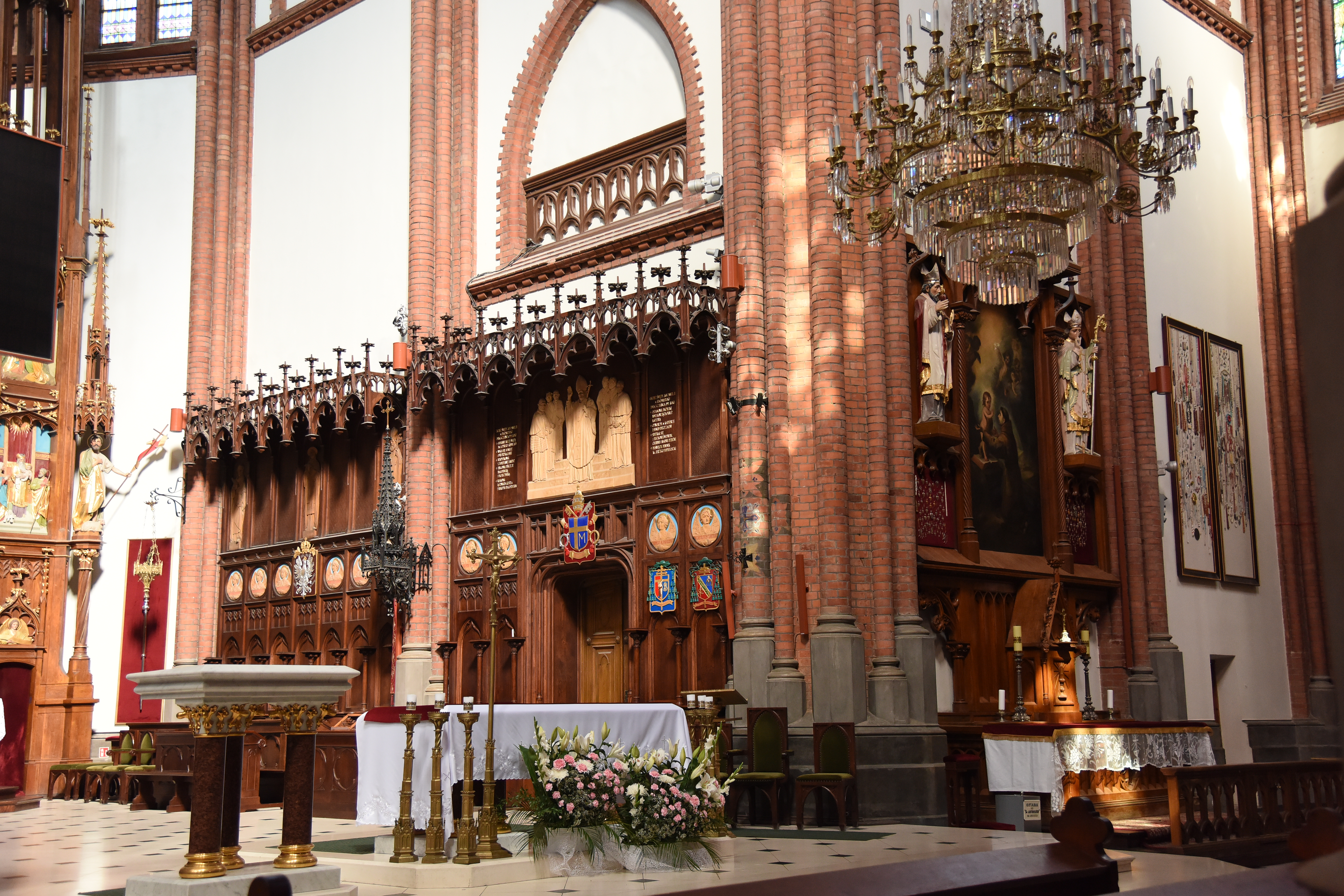
Interior view

The predecessor of the present cathedral was a Renaissance church was built between 1617 and 1626.

At the end of the 19th century, the parish had about 12,000 people and the original church that could accommodate about 1,000 people was too small. In the first half of the 19th century, the Białystok dean, Father Wilhelm Szwarc, began efforts to build a new church. He gained the support of the parishioners. The location of the future church was chosen as the St. Roch Hill with an inactive cemetery. Regarding the project, the dean contacted outstanding architects, Stefan Szyller and Józef Pius Dziekoński. Ultimately, the dean commissioned Dziekoński to prepare the designs, who completed the project at the end of 1895 and dated it January 1, 1896. The documentation included the location of the temple, a site plan, a plan of the foundations and the structure (facade, side elevations, sections) and a cost estimate of 92,948 rubles and 2 kopecks (including a 4% commission for the architect - 3,573 rubles).

The plan of the future temple reflected the building trends in sacral architecture at the time and assumed the construction of a so-called great cathedral in the Vistula-Baltic Gothic style. The horizontal plan and architectural description of the church indicated that it was a three-nave, four-bay basilica with a transept with a crossing of naves on a square plan and a presbytery with a semicircular ambulatory. From the outside, the body was to be clasped with flying buttresses. The temple was to be closed by a representative, two-tower façade.

In accordance with the administrative procedures of the time, the faithful submitted an application to the dean to build a new church, who sent the request along with the design and cost estimate to the Bishop's Curia in Vilnius. The Vilnius Consistory, in turn, sent the required documents to the governor in Grodno. When sending he proposal to the Bishop in Vilnius, the dean emphasized the fact that they had been prepared by the clerk of the Saint Petersburg Academy of Arts, architect Józef Dziekoński.

The turning point for the matter of building a new church was the visit of Tsar Nicholas II to Białystok in August 1897. During the meeting with the parish representatives, he responded favorably to the matter of a new church. Ultimately, in March 1898, the faithful received permission from the tsar's authorities only to expand the existing church funded by the Wiesiołowskis, because as part of the policy of Russification of the Polish population, the construction of a new church was not allowed.

It was then that the project of expanding the existing church by building a new, larger church was created. Dziekoński prepared a new location proposal and changed the previous design: he proposed to dismantle the presbytery of the old parish church and build a new church in the "large cathedral" type perpendicular to its axis. According to the modified design, the new church was to be enlarged by one bay between the transept and the presbytery, which was also extended. Dziekoński referred to his own design of St. Florian's Church in Warsaw's Praga. He slightly changed the appearance of the towers, enriching them with openwork structures, multi-stepped buttresses, pointed arches, pinnacles and spire cupolas. A pointed bell tower was to be built at the intersection of the main nave and the transept. Inside, there were to be cross vaults and star vaults at the intersection of the naves. The cost estimate for the new design, presented in April 1899, amounted to 117,815 rubles and 88 kopecks.

The governor's office approved the project on 16 November, and on 25 January 1900 the Construction Department officially informed the church authorities in Vilnius that the plan and cost estimate for the expansion of the Białystok church had been reviewed and received. In February, the Consistory sent a letter to the dean authorizing the expansion of the existing parish church, informing that the investment should be financed from voluntary donations from parishioners. After obtaining a building permit, the Church Construction Committee was established under the chairmanship of Father Szwarc and construction work began on April 19, 1900. On June 11 of the same year, Father Szwarc blessed the cornerstone. In mid-1901, the foundations of the church were completed and the church itself was built in the years 1902–1905.

On September 17, 1905, the church was solemnly consecrated by the order of the Bishop of Vilnius, Edward von Ropp, by the prelate of Vilnius, Father Jan Kurczewski. The finishing works in the interior were completed on October 27, 1907.

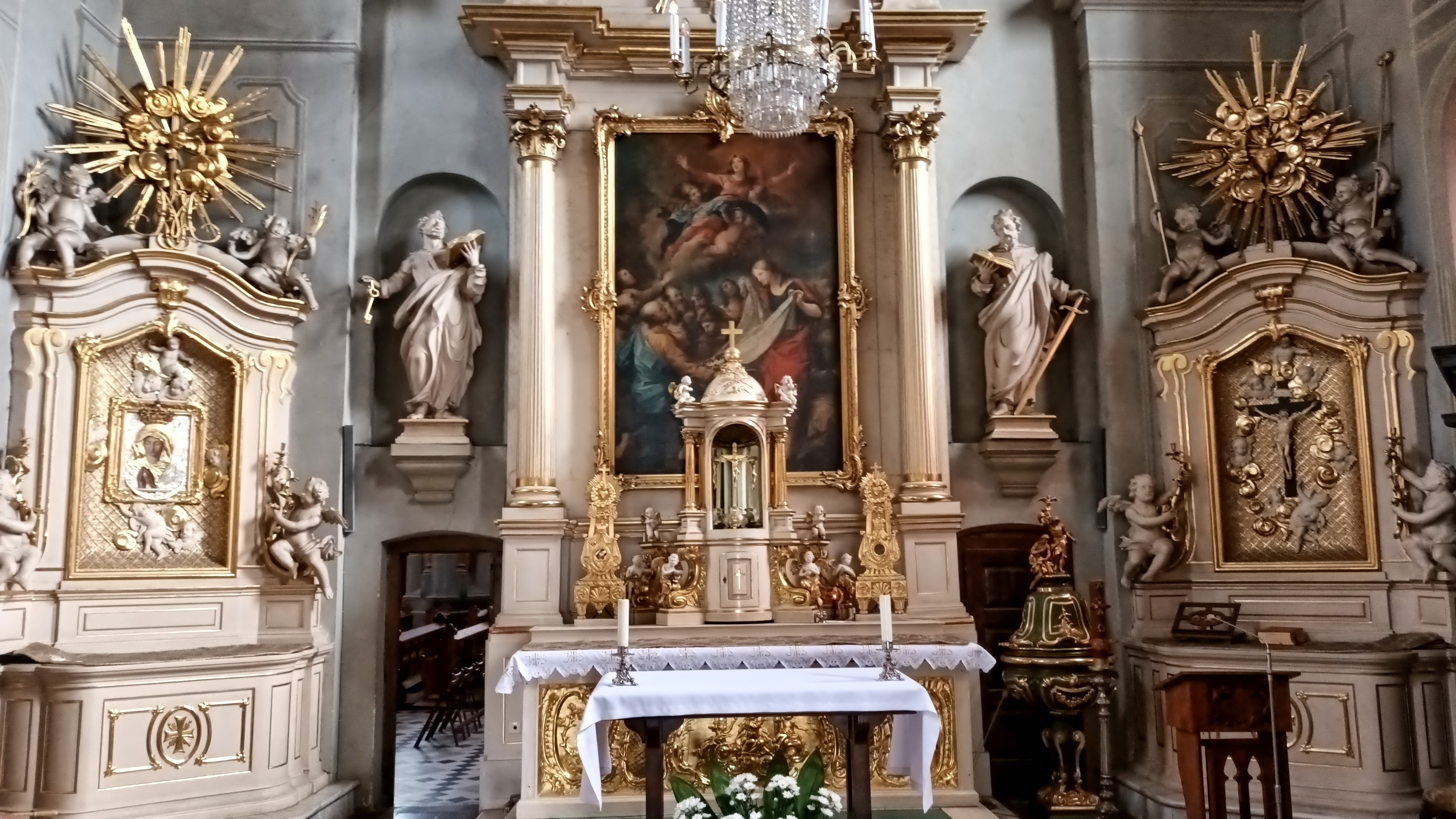
Altar of the old church

In the interwar period, the focus was on completing the interior design of the temple. At the beginning of 1925, the Warsaw sculptor Wincenty Begnesy presented a design for the stalls and the frame of the portal leading to the sacristy. The stalls were to be made of wood and placed on both sides of the presbytery. They were to consist of seats and backrests with suspended canopies and their decoration was to be neo-Gothic (tracery, pinnacles, finials). The design was partially implemented - the seats were placed on both sides only in the altar bay.

In 1926, the design for the Crucifixion altar, also by Begnesy, was ready. A temporary, neo-Gothic altar with a painting of St. Roch was also placed in the left arm of the transept.

In the years 1926–1929, two neo-Gothic confessionals and pews were made, and 14 Stations of the Cross were hung on the church walls – bas-reliefs cast in plaster and enclosed in neo-Gothic frames.

In 1938, an agreement was concluded with the City Council regarding the regulation of the intersection of Kościelna and Niemiecka Streets (currently Kilińskiego); a concrete retaining wall was built to secure the temple located on a high embankment, and the square in front of the church facade was redesigned.

=== World War II ===
The war period was characterized by an atmosphere of tension and terror. The presbytery and parish house were home to Nazi or Soviet security services. In June 1941 Dean Aleksander Chodyka was arrested in a search conducted in the church by the Soviet when they claimed about shooting done from the church tower. In 1941, the church interior was painted cream. In 1941–1942, new polychromes were made and a parquet floor was laid in the old church.

On July 22–23, 1944, the church spared the destruction of Białystok by the Germans retreating from the Eastern Front, with the church buildings did not sustain any major damage, unlike the completely burnt-out downtown of Białystok.

Between 1996 and 2004 the church was restored.

== Parish ==
Parish of the Assumption of the Blessed Virgin Mary

=== Terrain ===
To parish belong buildings from streets: Akademicka, Augustowska, Biała, Białówny, Curie-Skłodowskiej, Czackiego, Kalinowskiego (2 and 4), Konopnickiej, Kościelna, Krasińskiego, Legionowa, Liniarskiego, Lipowa (even numbers to 14, odd numbers to 29), Malmeda, Mariańskiego, Mickiewicza (odd numbers 7-41), Św. Mikołaja (6, 7a, 7), Młynowa (2, 4, 12a, 18, 20), Nowy Świat, Ogrodowa (10a), Orzeszkowej (odd numbers to 17, even numbers to 28), Pałacowa (4), Piękna, Al. Piłsudskiego (even numbers 24-44), Piotrkowska, Plac Jana Pawła II, Rynek Kościuszki, Sienkiewicza (1-9, 2-44), Spółdzielcza, Suraska, Świętojańska (13a-19, 18-32), Waszyngtona (1-11, 6-18), Wojskowa, Zamenhofa.

== See also ==
- Roman Catholicism in Poland
- Assumption Cathedral (disambiguation)
