= Tadeusz Pikus =

Polish Catholic prelate (born 1949)

- Bishop emeritus of Drochiczyn
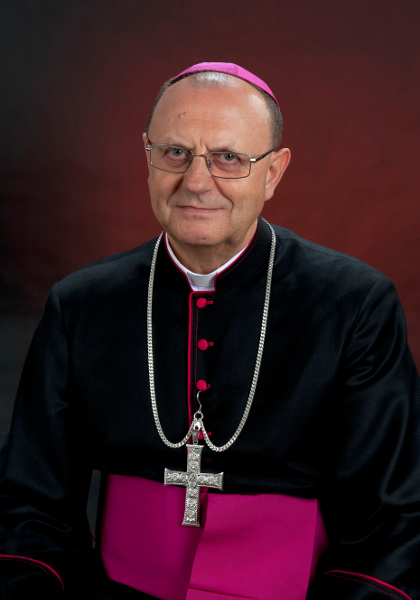
- Appointed: 29 March 2014
- Term ended: 17 June 2019
- Previous post: Auxiliary bishop of Warsaw (1999–2014)

Orders
- Ordination: 7 June 1981 by Jerzy Modzelewski
- Consecration: 8 May 1999 by Józef Glemp

Personal details
- Born: 1 September 1949 (age 76) Zabiele, Republic of Poland
- Motto: Surrexit Dominus vere!; (The Lord has truly risen!)
- Coat of arms

Tadeusz Pikus (born 1 September 1949 in Zabiele, Mońki County) is a Polish Roman Catholic prelate who was bishop of Drohiczyn from 2014 to 2019. He was previously auxiliary bishop of Warsaw from 1999 to 2014.

== Biography ==
Pikus was born on 1 September 1949 to Bronisław and Stanisława Pikus (née Gudel). He was given the sacrament of baptism on 18 September 1949 by Antoni Bachurzewski and the sacrament of confirmation on 21 April 1963 by Władysław Suszyński. After obtaining his matura in 1975, he began studying at the metropolitan seminary in Warsaw. He was ordained to the diaconate on 4 May 1980 and to the priesthood on 7 June 1981 at St. John's Archcathedral by Jerzy Modzelewski. He obtained a magister degree in patristics from the Academy of Catholic Theology in 1981, followed by a licenciate in 1983. After serving at Jaktorów during this period as an assistant parish vicar, he was sent in 1983 to the University of Navarre to study fundamental theology. He obtained a doctorate from the University on 21 June 1985 after defending his dissertation, La noción de Apologetica segun Gardeil.

After returning to Poland, Pikus taught Latin and fundamental theology at the metropolitan seminary in Warsaw between 1985 and 1993, while also working as a clerk for the Secretariat of the Primate of Poland. He was appointed rector of the metropolitan seminary in 1987, and was raised to prefect in 1988. In 1989, he was appointed secretary for the Pontifical Faculty of Theology in Warsaw. In 1990, he was sent to Moscow as a chaplain, where he founded a college for Catholic theology, serving as its dean and as a lecturer in fundamental theology between 1991 and 1992. Afterwards, he began teaching at the Pontifical Faculty of Theology in Warsaw between 1993 and 1998.

On 24 April 1999, Pikus was appointed by Pope John Paul II as auxiliary bishop of Warsaw and titular bishop of Lysinia; he was consecrated on 8 May 1999 in St. John's Archcathedral by Józef Glemp, assisted by Kazimierz Romaniuk and Bronisław Dembowski. He was appointed vicar general of the Archdiocese of Warsaw on 29 May 1999 and titular canon of the cathedral chapter of Warsaw on 24 December 1999. He was named associate professor of Cardinal Stefan Wyszyński University in Warsaw in 2002, and was appointed professor of theology on 14 April 2008.

On 29 March 2014, Pope Francis named Pikus bishop of Drohiczyn. He assumed canonical control of the Diocese on 24 May 2014 and formally assumed his position the following day. He resigned on 17 June 2019.

== Publications ==
- Aleksander Mień, kapłan Kościoła prawosławnego – zamordowany, ISBN 83-7192-012-1, Warsaw 1997
- Rosja w objęciach ateizmu, ISBN 83-85706-35-6, Warsaw 1997
- Aksjologiczny wymiar religii w twórczości Aleksandra Mienia : studium analityczno-krytyczne, ISBN 83-86851-88-0, Warsaw 1998
- Katolik w Rosji, ISBN 83-87802-67-0, Warsaw 2003
- O władzy w Kościele, ISBN 83-89203-06-5, Warsaw 2003
- Etiologiczna demarkacja dialogu religijnego w Kościele Katolickim, ISBN 83-7072-414-0, Warsaw 2006
