= Oued Sidi Salah =

Wadi of eastern Tunisia

Oued Sidi Salah is a wadi of eastern Tunisia. It rises in the hinterland behind the city of Sfax and empties into the Chott El Merdasia near Sidi Mansour (Sfax Governorate), on the Mediterranean coast. The wadi takes its name from Dar Mahommed Salah, which it flows past.
