= Diocese of Pinsk =

Roman Catholic diocese in Belarus

Diocese of Pinsk Dioecesis Pinskensis Latinorum Пінская дыяцэзія

Catholic

Location
- Country: Belarus
- Ecclesiastical province: Minsk-Mohilev

Statistics
- Area: 72,700 km^{2} (28,100 sq mi)
- Population: Total; Catholics: (as of 2013); 3,110,000; 50,000 (1.6%)

Information
- Denomination: Catholic Church
- Sui iuris church: Latin Church
- Rite: Roman Rite
- Cathedral: Cathedral Basilica of the Assumption of the Blessed Virgin Mary, Pinsk (Унебаўзяцця Найсвяцейшай Панны Марыі)

Current leadership
- Pope: Leo XIV
- Bishop: Antoni Dziemianko
- Metropolitan Archbishop: Tadeusz Kondrusiewicz
- Auxiliary Bishops: Andrei Znoska

Map
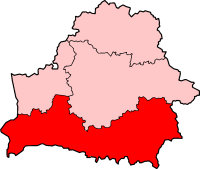
- Location of Diocese of Pinsk in Belarus

The Diocese of Pinsk (Latin: Pinsken(sis) Latinorum, Belarusian: Пінская) is a Latin Church ecclesiastical territory or diocese in Belarus. It is a suffragan diocese in the ecclesiastical province of the metropolitan Archdiocese of Minsk-Mohilev.

Its cathedral is a minor basilica: the Cathedral Basilica of the Assumption of the Virgin Mary, in the episcopal see of Pinsk.

== History ==
- 28 October 1925: Established as Diocese of Pinsk/Пінская (Беларуская)/Pinsken(sis) Latinorum (Latin adjective), on territory split off from the then Diocese of Minsk (which also provided its first incumbent by transfer), then suffragan of the Archdiocese of Vilnius (then both in Poland)
- Lost territory on 1991.06.05 to establish the Diocese of Drohiczyn.
- In 1993, the diocesan Caritas (Belarusian: Карытас Пінскай дыяцэзіі) was established.

== Statistics ==
As of 2021, it pastorally served 50,825 Catholics (1.8% of 2,780,000 total) on 72,700 km^{2} in 87 parishes with 52 priests (36 diocesan, 16 religious), 62 lay religious (26 brothers, 36 sisters) and 8 seminarians.

== Episcopal ordinaries ==
Bishops of Pinsk

- Zygmunt Łoziński (1925.10.28 – death 1932.03.26), previously Bishop of Minsk (Belarus) (1917.11.02 – 1925.10.28)
- Kazimierz Bukraba (1932.07.10 – death 1946.05.06)
- Apostolic Administrator Władysław Jędruszuk (1967.02.16 – 1991.06.05), while Auxiliary Bishop of Pinsk (1962.11.19 – 1991.06.05) and Titular Bishop of Clysma (1962.11.19 – 1991.06.05); later Bishop of Drohiczyn (Poland) (1991.06.05 – death 1994.05.25)
  - Apostolic Administrator Kazimierz Świątek (Казімір Свёнтэк) (1991.04.13 - 2011.06.30) while Metropolitan Archbishop of Minsk-Mohilev (Belarus) (1991.04.13 – retired 2006.06.14), created Cardinal-Priest of S. Gerardo Maiella (1994.11.26 – death 2011.07.21), President of Catholic Episcopal Conference of Belarus (1999.02.11 – 2006.06.14)
  - Apostolic Administrator Tadeusz Kondrusiewicz (2011.06.30 - 2012.06.16) while Metropolitan Archbishop of Minsk-Mohilev (Belarus) (2007.09.21 – ...), Vice-President of Catholic Episcopal Conference of Belarus (2006? – 2015.06.03); previously Titular Bishop of Hippo Diarrhytus (1989.05.10 – 2002.02.11) as Apostolic Administrator of Minsk (Belarus) (1989.05.10 – 1991.04.13), Apostolic Administrator of Northern European Russia (Russia) (1991.04.13 – 2002.02.11), President of Conference of Catholic Bishops of Russia (1999 – 2005), Metropolitan Archbishop of (Mother of God at) Moscow (Russia) (2002.02.11 – 2007.09.21); later President of Catholic Episcopal Conference of Belarus (2015.06.03 – ...)
- Antoni Dziemianko (2012.06.16 - ... ), previously Titular Bishop of Lesvi (1998.07.04 – 2012.05.03) as Auxiliary Bishop of Diocese of Grodno (Belarus) (1998.07.04 – 2004.12.14) and as Auxiliary Bishop of Archdiocese of Minsk-Mohilev (Belarus) (2004.12.14 – 2012.05.03), Secretary General of Catholic Episcopal Conference of Belarus (2006? – 2015.06.03), Apostolic Administrator of Archdiocese of Minsk-Mohilev (Belarus) (2006.06.14 – 2007.09.21).

== See also ==
- List of Catholic dioceses in Belarus
- the former Ruthenian Catholic Archeparchy of Polotsk–Vitebsk
- Roman Catholicism in Belarus

== Sources and external links ==
- Diocesan website
- GCatholic.org - data for all sections
- Catholic Hierarchy
