= Archdiocese of Białystok =

Roman Catholic archdiocese in Poland

Coordinates: 53°7′59.23″N 23°9′51.08″E

Archdiocese of Białystok Archidioecesis Bialostocensis Archidiecezja Białostocka

Catholic
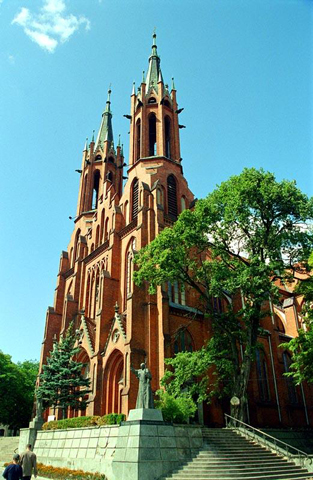
- Cathedral of the Assumption

Location
- Country: Poland
- Metropolitan: Białystok

Statistics
- Area: 6,263 km^{2} (2,418 sq mi)
- Population: Total; Catholics: (as of 2022); 437,790; 352,330 (80.5%)
- Parishes: 116

Information
- Denomination: Catholic Church
- Sui iuris church: Latin Church
- Rite: Roman Rite
- Established: 5 June 1991
- Cathedral: Cathedral Basilica of the Assumption of the Blessed Virgin Mary

Current leadership
- Pope: Leo XIV
- Archbishop: Józef Guzdek
- Suffragans: Diocese of Drohiczyn, Diocese of Łomża
- Auxiliary Bishops: Henryk Ciereszko

Website
- Website of the Diocese

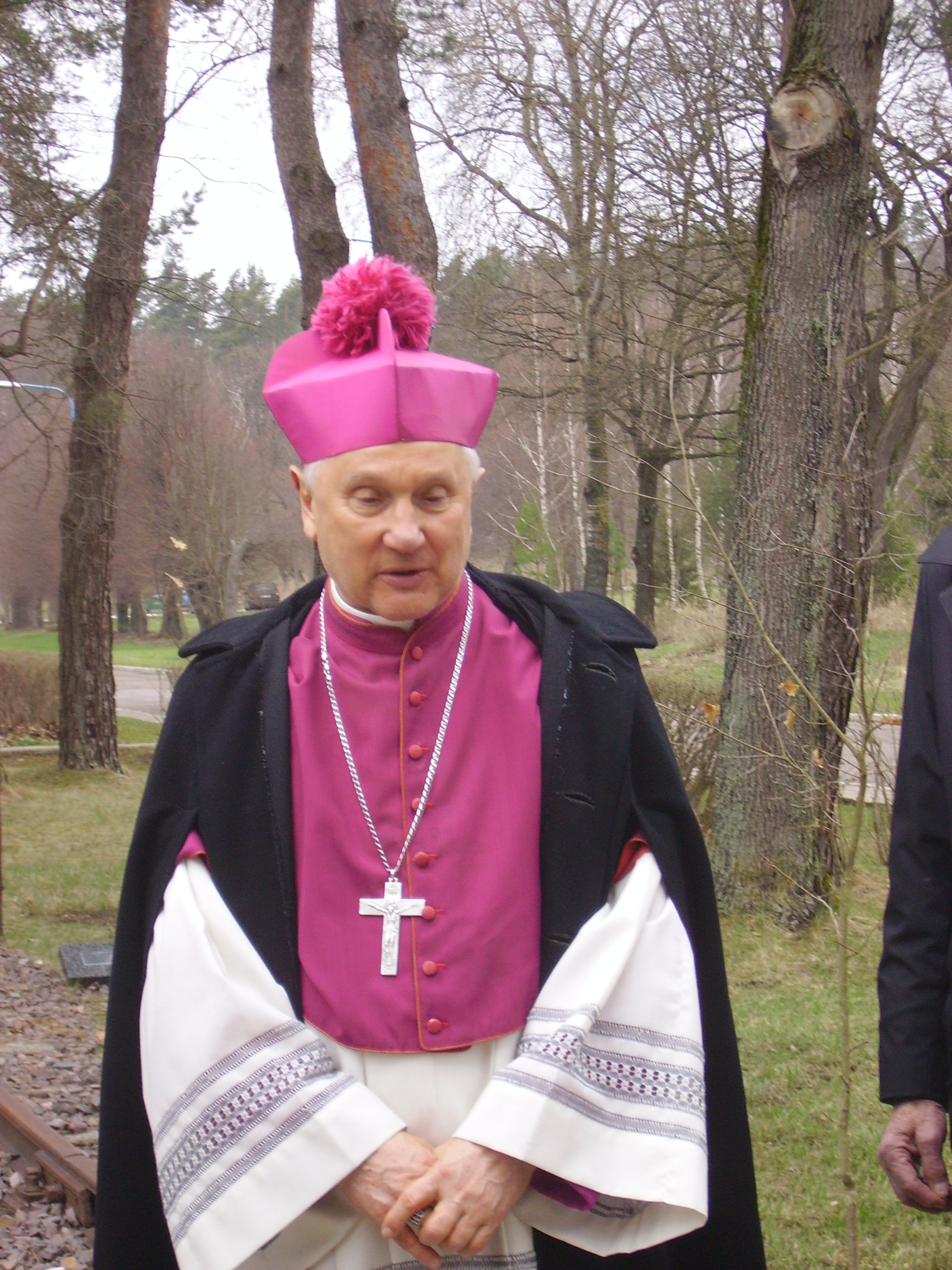
Edward Ozorowski, Archbishop of Białystok

The Archdiocese of Białystok (Latin: Bialostocen(sis); Belarusian: Беластоцкая архідыяцэзія, romanized: Biełastockaja archidyjacezia) is a Latin Church ecclesiastical territory or archdiocese of the Catholic Church in Podlaskie Voivodeship, Northeastern Poland. It is a metropolitan see with two suffragan dioceses.

Its cathedral archiepiscopal see is Bazylika Archikatedralna Wniebowzięcia NMP, a minor basilica in the episcopal see of Białystok. It also has a second minor basilica : Bazylika Ofiarowania Najświętszej Marii Panny, dedicated to the Presentation of the Blessed Virgin Mary, in Różanystok.

There are currently 431 priests in the Archdiocese. The most recent death of a priest was that of Fr. Józef Jaroma on 12 August at age 88. The most recent ordination took place on 24 May when two priests were ordained.

== Ecclesiastical province ==
Its Suffragan sees are :

- Diocese of Drohiczyn
- Diocese of Łomża

== Statistics ==
As of 2022, it pastorally served 352,330 Catholics (80.5% of 437,790 total; however only 43,2% are active members) on 5,550 km^{2} in 116 parishes and 25 missions with 390 priests (360 diocesan, 30 religious), 190 lay religious (34 brothers, 156 sisters) and 60 seminarians.

== History ==
- 1945 : Białystok became the effective see of the Archdiocese of Vilnius for the Soviet persecution
- Established June 5, 1991 as Diocese of Białystok on Polish territory split off from the Metropolitan Archdiocese of Vilnius in Lithuania
- Enjoyed a Papal visit from the Pope John Paul II in June 1991.
- Promoted on March 25, 1992, by the same as Archdiocese of Białystok

== Episcopal ordinaries ==
Bishops of Białystok

- Edward Kisiel (1991.06.05 – retired 1992.03.25), died 1993; previously Titular Bishop of Limata (1976.05.03 – 1991.06.05) as Apostolic Administrator of Białystok (1976.05.03 – 1991.06.05)

Metropolitan Archbishops of Białystok

- Stanisław Szymecki (1993.05.15 – retired 2000.11.16), died 2023; previously Bishop of Kielce (Poland) (1981.03.27 – 1993.05.15)
- Wojciech Ziemba (2000.11.16 – 2006.05.30), died 2021; next Metropolitan Archbishop of Warmia (Poland) (2006.05.30 – 2016.10.15); previously Titular Bishop of Falerone (1982.06.19 – 1992.03.25) as Auxiliary Bishop of Warmia (Poland) (1982.06.19 – 1992.03.25), Bishop of Ełk (Poland) (1992.03.25 – 2000.11.16)
- Edward Ozorowski (2006.10.20 – retired 2017.04.12), died 2024; previously Titular Bishop of Bitetto (1979.01.31 – 2006.10.20), first as Auxiliary Bishop of Vilnius (Lithuania) (1979.01.31 – 1991.06.05), then as Auxiliary Bishop of Białystok (1991.06.05 – succession 2006.10.20)
- Tadeusz Wojda, (S.A.C.) (2017.06.10 – 2021.03.02); next Metropolitan Archbishop of Gdańsk (Poland) (since 2021.03.25); previously Undersecretary of the Roman Congregation for the Evangelization of Peoples (2012.07.24 – 2017.04.12).
- Józef Guzdek (3 September 2021 – present); previously Titular Bishop of Treba (2004.09.15 – 2010.12.04) as Auxiliary Bishop of the Kraków, Bishop of Military Ordinariate of Poland (Poland) (2010.12.19 – 2021.07.14)

== See also ==
- List of Catholic dioceses in Poland
- Roman Catholicism in Poland

== Sources and external links ==
- GCatholic.org, with Google map & satellite photo - data for all sections
- Catholic Hierarchy ^{[self-published]}
- Diocese website (in Polish)
