= Iosif Staneŭski =

Belarusian Roman Catholic Archbishop (born 1969)

The Most Reverend Iosif Staneŭski
- Metropolitan Archbishop of Minsk-Mohilev
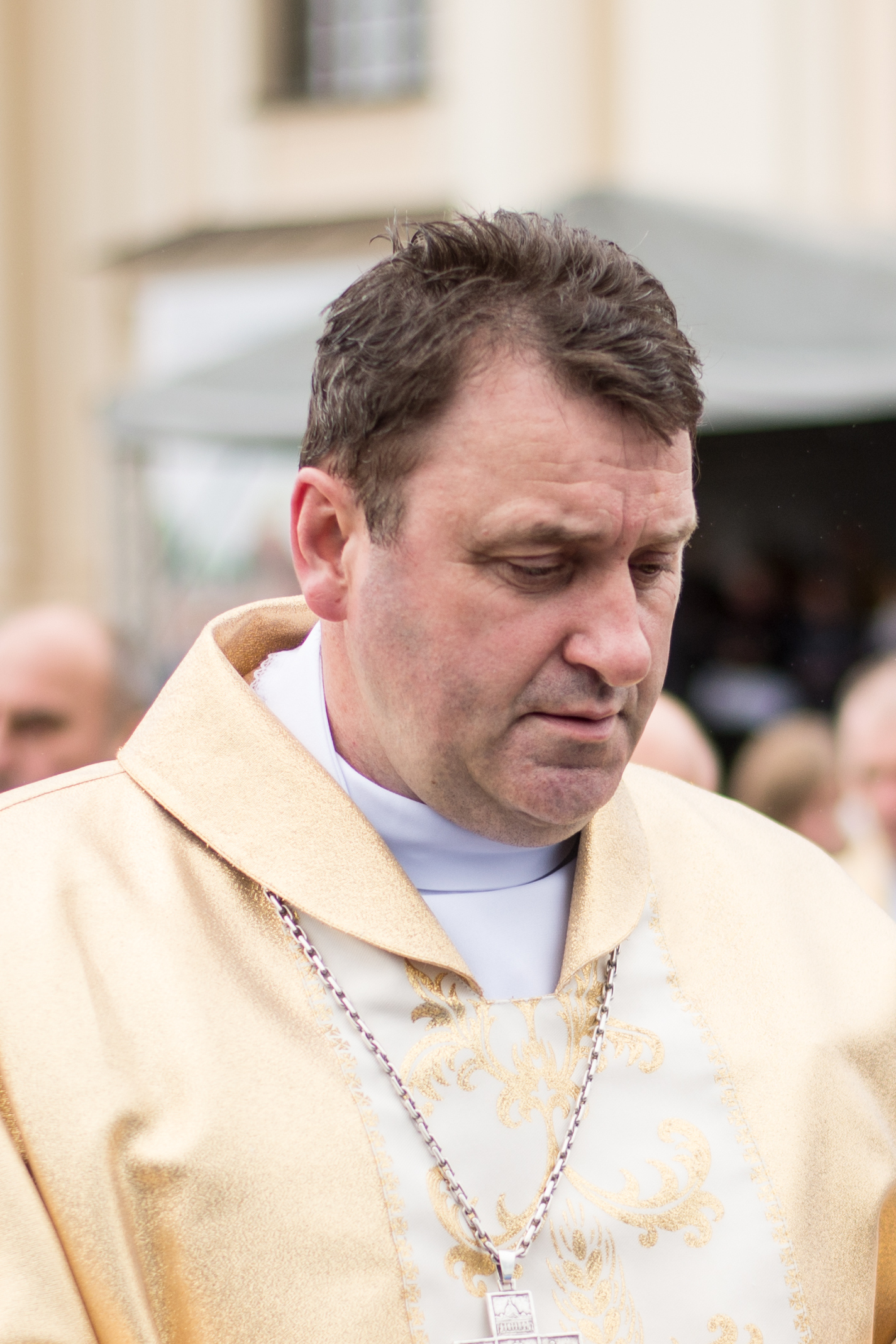
- Native name: Іосіф Станеўскі
- Church: Roman Catholic Church
- Archdiocese: Minsk-Mohilev
- Province: Minsk-Mohilev
- Appointed: 14 September 2021
- Installed: 23 October 2021
- Predecessor: Tadeusz Kondrusiewicz
- Other post: Auxiliary Bishop of Hrodna
- Previous post: Auxiliary Bishop of Hrodna (2013-2021)

Orders
- Ordination: 17 June 1995
- Consecration: 29 November 2013

Personal details
- Born: 17 April 1969 (age 57) Grodno, Belarus.
- Denomination: Catholic Church
- Occupation: Archbishop, Clergyman
- Profession: Theologian, Philosopher, Ecclesiastical Jurist
- Education: John Paul II Catholic University of Lublin
- Motto: EVANGELII GAUDIUM – CHRISTUS VIVIT
- Coat of arms

Styles of Iosif Staneŭski
- Reference style: The Most Reverend
- Spoken style: Your Excellency
- Religious style: Archbishop

Iosif Staneŭski (Belarusian: Іосіф Станеўскі; Polish: Józef Stanewski; born 17 April 1969) is a Belarusian prelate of the Catholic Church who served as Metropolitan Archbishop of Minsk-Mohilev since 2021. His Installation took place on October 23, 2021.
