= Our Lady of Budslau =

Belarusian Catholic icon

Our Lady of Budslau Budslaŭski abraz Maci Božaj
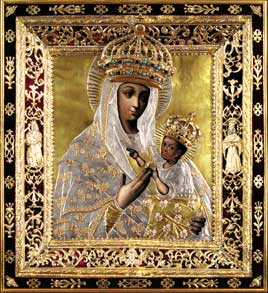
- Location: Budslau, Belarus
- Date: Attested as early as 16th century
- Type: Wooden icon, bejewelled
- Approval: Pope Clement VIII; Pope John Paul II
- Shrine: Basilica of the Our Lady of Assumption
- Patronage: Belarusian peoples
- Attributes: Madonna and Child

Our Lady of Budslau (Belarusian: Будслаўскі абраз Маці Божай, romanized: Budslaŭski abraz Maci Božaj, lit. 'Budslau icon of the Mother of God') is a venerated icon of the Blessed Virgin Mary enshrined within the Basilica of the Our Lady of Assumption in the village of Budslau, Belarus.

== History ==
The icon was manufactured by an unknown artisan in the 16th century. It became a present to Voivode of Minsk Jan Dominikowicz Pac by Pope Clement VIII to honor his conversion from Calvinism into Roman Catholicism in 1598. Pac treasured the icon and kept it at the Pac Palace in Vilnius. After the death of Pac, the icon has passed to chaplain Isaac Skalai who brought it to Daŭhinava. In 1613, Skalai gifted it to the Bernardine monastery in Budslav.

The icon was known for miraculous healings that were described in the book of the abbot E. Zyalevich Zodiac on the earth (1650). In 1635, Our Lady of Budslau was moved to the main altar in place of the visitation icon. The first miracle was recorded in 1617 – curing blindness of the five-year-old Jehoshaphat Tyszkiewicz, who later became a known Carmelite priest. On the same day Reginald Tyszkiewicz was cured of epilepsy, which had plagued him for seven years. Zyalevich described 42 miraculous recoveries and an episode with Ian Vronsky, captain serving Janusz Kiszka, Grand Hetman and Voivode of Polock. The wounded captain was captured by the Tsardom of Russia in 1632 but was able to safely return because of a vow in front of the icon, which belonged to his friend Lukas Vladovsky. Perhaps that was the reason why Janusz Kiszka became one of the sponsors of the stone church in 1633–1643. A riza was added to the icon in the 1st half of the 17th century.

In 1643, the master of Polotsk Andrew Kromer built the Church of the Assumption of the Blessed Virgin Mary, for which Peter Gramel created a unique wooden altar, and where the icon was placed. During the Russo-Polish War (1654–1667), the icon was temporarily evacuated to the town of Sokółka.

== Marian cult and veneration ==
The Order of Cistercians promoted the Marian cult of the icon, and made reprints of it from the beginning of the 19th century. After the monastery was closed by the Tsarist authorities in 1859, the popularity of the icon has decreased. However, in the Catalog of the Diocese of Vilna, Budslau was included among the ten churches with miraculous icons of Our Lady.

After the dissolution of the Soviet Union, the cult of the icon recovered. Starting in 1990, an annual pilgrimage takes place on July 2. In 1991–1992, the icon was restored by Loukachevitch.

On 2 July 1996, the papal nuncio, Archbishop Dominik Hrušovský delivered the Pontifical message from Rome announcing Our Lady of Budslau as the patroness of the Roman Catholic Archdiocese of Minsk-Mohilev. Generally, the icon is also regarded as the patroness of Belarus.

== Pontifical approbations ==
- Pope Clement VIII endorsed the image to combat the heresy of Calvinism in 1598.
- Pope John Paul II issued the following decrees:
  - Granted a pontifical decree Inter paroeciales that raised the shrine of this icon to the status of Minor Basilica on 11 June 1993.
  - Granted a decree of pontifical coronation titled Purissima Virgo for the image on 7 June 1995. The icon was crowned by Cardinal Kazimierz Świątek on 2 July 1998.

== UNESCO ==
The icon is celebrated on July 2. On 28 November 2018, this annual Marian celebration was added to the List of the Intangible Cultural Heritage by UNESCO.
