= St. Francis Xavier Cathedral, Grodno =

Coordinates: 53°40′41″N 23°49′53″E

St. Francis Xavier Cathedral
- The Cathedral Basilica of Saint Francis Xavier
- Катэдральны касцёл Святога Францішка Ксавэрыя
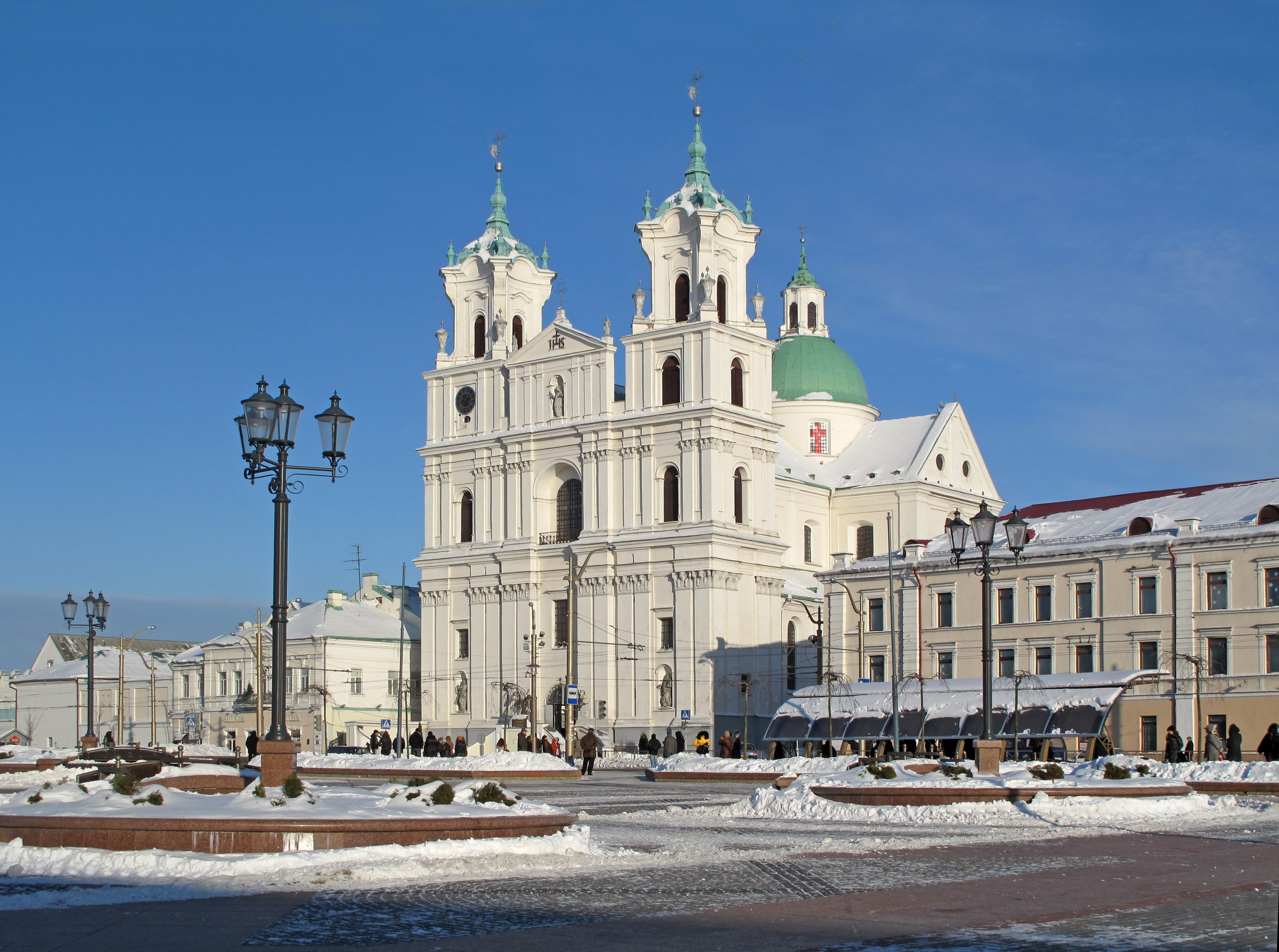
- A view of the cathedral
- St. Francis Xavier Cathedral
- Location: Grodno
- Country: Belarus
- Denomination: Roman Catholic

History
- Status: Active
- Founded: 1687
- Consecrated: 1705

Architecture
- Functional status: Cathedral
- Style: Baroque architecture

Administration
- Diocese: Roman Catholic Diocese of Grodno

Clergy
- Bishop: Aleksander Kaszkiewicz

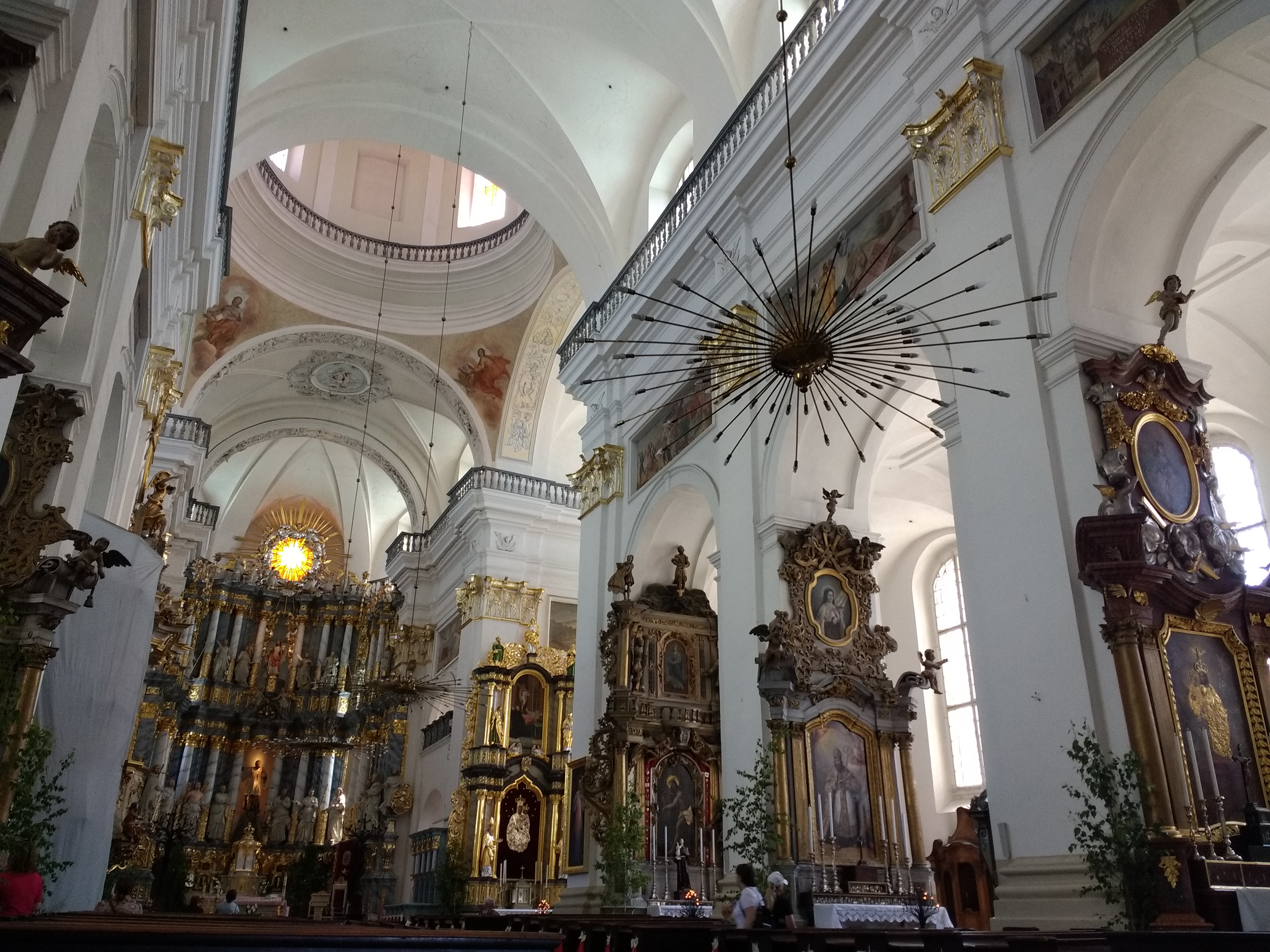
Interior of the cathedral

St. Francis Xavier Cathedral (Note: Belarusian: Кафедральны касцёл Святога Францішка Ксаверыя, romanized: Kafedralny kascioł Sviatoha Franciška Ksavieryja; Russian: Собор Святого Франциска Ксаверия, romanized: Sobor Svyatogo Frantsiska Ksaveriya, Polish: Bazylika katedralna św. Franciszka Ksawerego w Grodnie) is a Roman Catholic cathedral in Grodno, Belarus. Originally a Jesuit church, it became a cathedral in 1991, when the new diocese of Grodno was erected. Nowadays it is one of only four minor basilicas in Belarus.

== History ==
=== Construction ===
The construction of the church started in 1687, when the city was part of the Polish-Lithuanian Commonwealth. The completed building in Baroque style became one of the most important baroque basilica in Europe.

In the 12th to 14th centuries a pendulum clock was installed in one of the towers. Nowadays it is one of the oldest active clocks in Europe.

The cathedral was consecrated in 1705 to St. Francis Xavier by bishop Teodor Potocki. The ceremony was attended by the Russian Emperor Peter the Great and the King of Poland Augustus II the Strong. Sixty meters in length and thirty meters wide, it became one of the largest in Europe. During the 18th century the Jesuits were decorating the cathedral with frescoes, ordered altars and baroque domes. The retable (lat. 'retabulum') got more than 70 sculptures of high artistic value, 20 on the first level, 15 on the second, and 14 on the third. Among them there are four female figures as personification of the continents, two lions, 14 angels, etc.

The monastery was dissolved in 1773 and the church became a parish one.

=== 20th to 21st centuries ===
The church survived World War II with no serious damage.

In 1960 it was officially closed for public religious services (for 27 years). The Soviet authorities tried to convert the building into a museum or a concert hall. Despite this, people attended the church every Sunday for a common prayer, songs and rosary. The religious services were restored in 1987. In 1990 the church was granted the title of minor basilica, and a year later it became a cathedral for a diocese of Grodno.

== See also ==
- List of Jesuit sites

== Sources ==
- А.А. Ярашэвіч, В.Дз. Бажэнава. Гродзенскі кафедральны касцёл святога Францыска Ксаверыя – Мінск: Беларусь, 2005. (In Belarusian)
- Szulakowska, Urszula (2018). Renaissance and Baroque Art and Culture in the Eastern Polish-Lithuanian Commonwealth (1506-1696). Cambridge Scholar Publishing. p. 324. ISBN 978-1-5275-1135-4.
- Asnorevsky, Eugene (2021). Гродно – столица, которая осталась [Grodno – the Capital that Stayed] (in Russian). ISBN 978-5043702487.
