= Church of Saint Anthony of Padua (Dwarec) =

Church in Dwarec, Belarus

- Касцёл Божага Цела
- Church of Saint Anthony of Padua
- 53°24′39″N 25°34′30″E
- Location: Dwarec
- Country: Belarus
- Denomination: Roman Catholic church

Architecture
- Style: Neo-Baroque
- Completed: 1904

Administration
- Diocese: Roman Catholic Diocese of Grodno

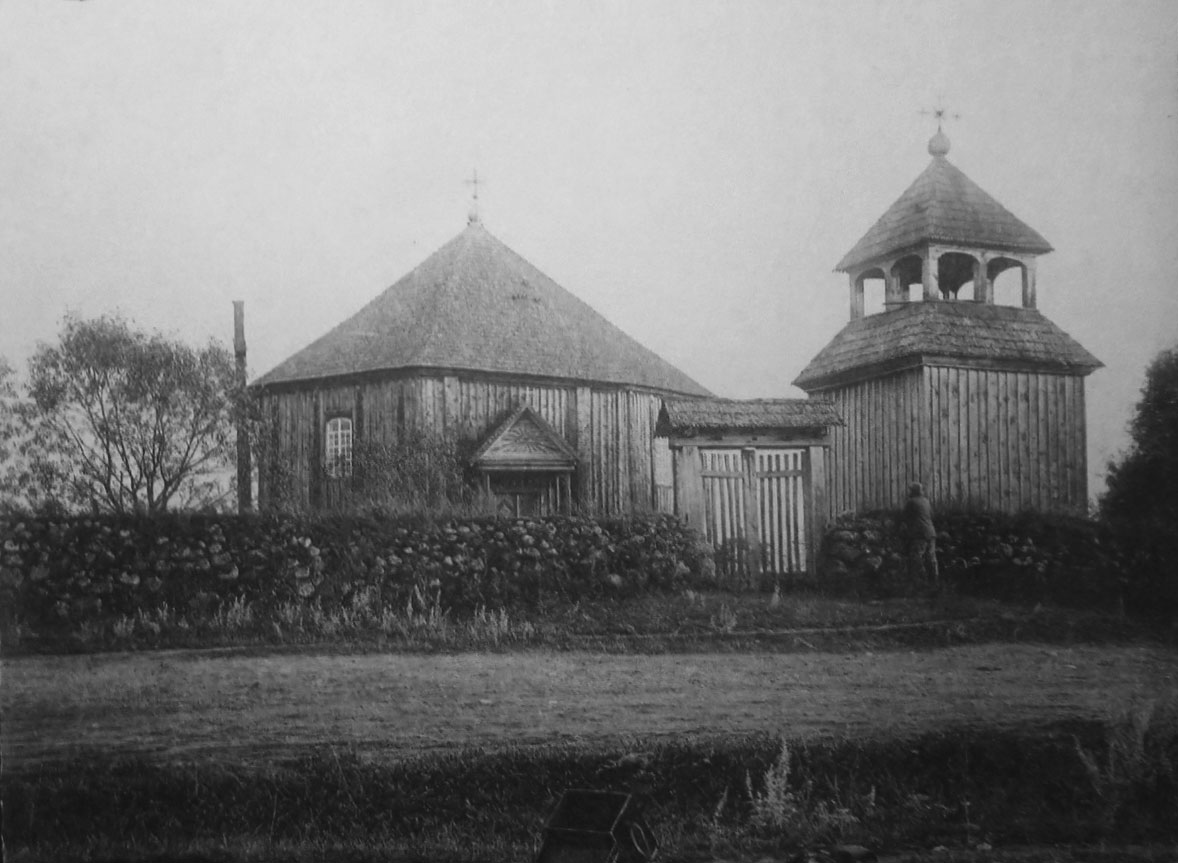
The demolished wooden church in 1900

Church of Saint Anthony of Padua in Dwarec is a Roman Catholic church in Belarus, listed as a national Cultural heritage monument. In some sources it is called Corpus Christi church.

First written mentions of Dvarec date back to the early 15th century. Since 1451 several generations of the Kęsgaila family owned the town. In 1516 they established a Catholic parish in the town. In the 17th century the church had an icon of St Mary that was considered a miraculous one.

The old wooden church was demolished in the early 1900s and a Neo-Baroque stone church was built in its place by 1904. It was consecrated in the name of Saint Anthony of Padua.

After the World War II the church was closed and used as stables. It was restored only almost 50 years later, in 1989, and reconsecrated in 1990.

== Gallery ==
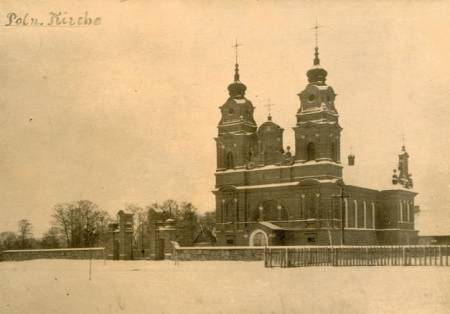
The church in 1918

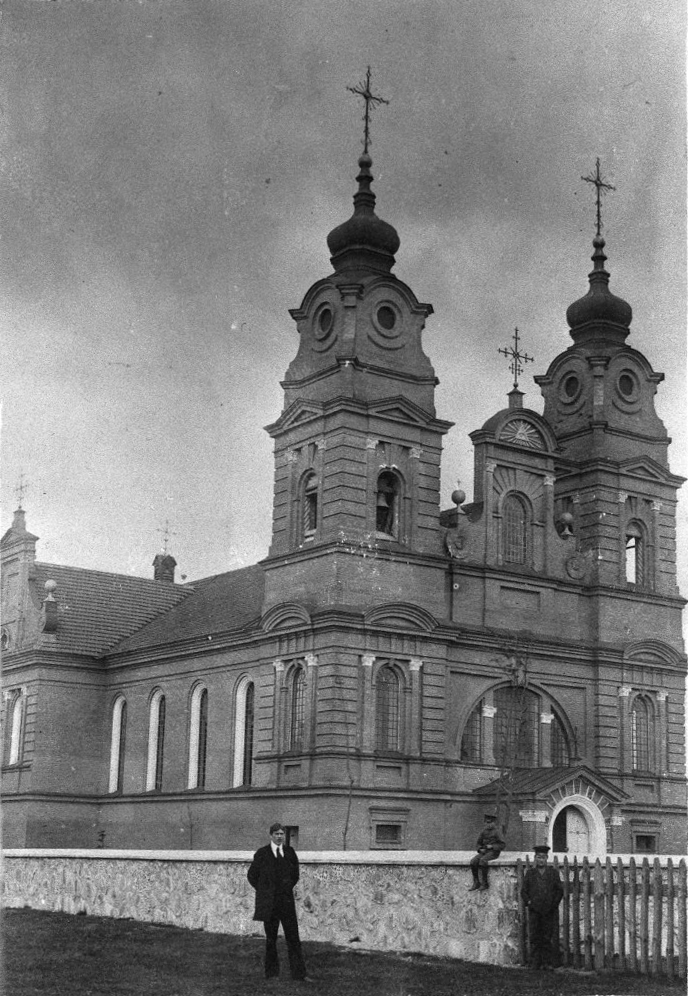
In the 1930s

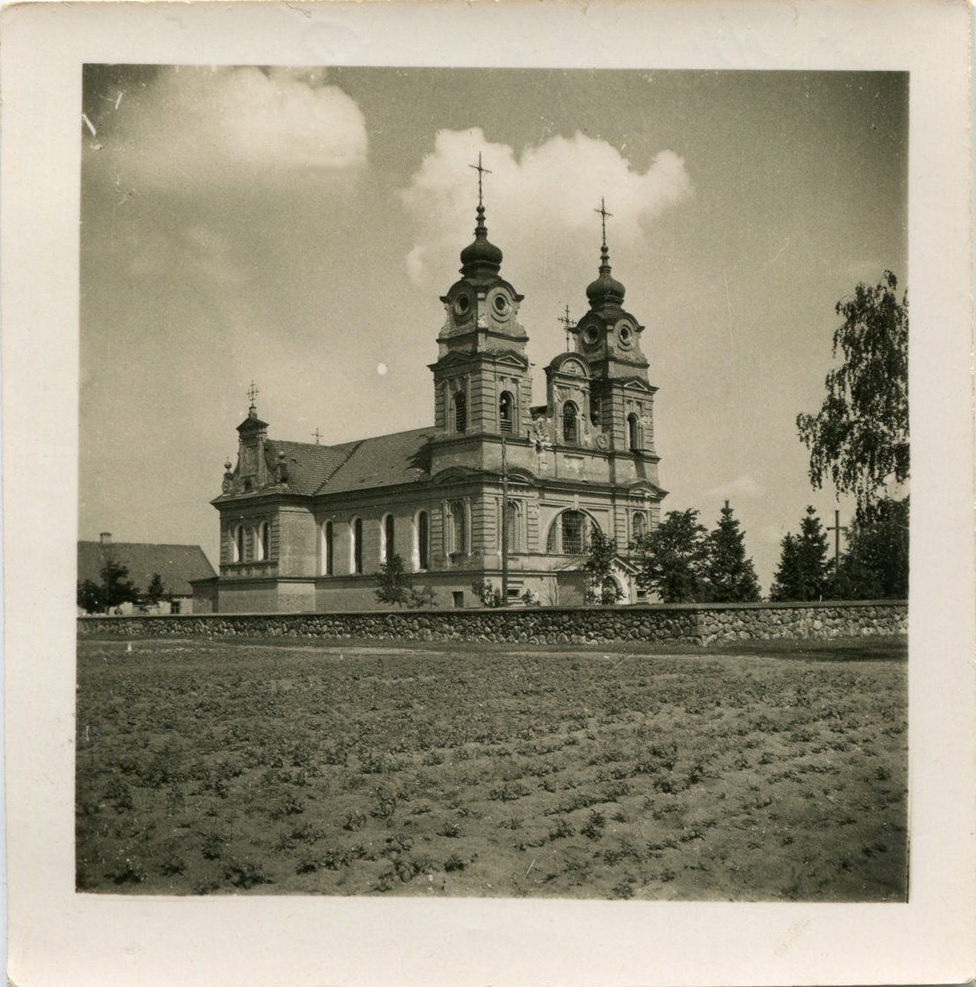
Between 1941 and 1944

== Sources ==
- Kulagin, A. M. (1986). Збор помнікаў гісторыі і культуры. Гродзенская вобласць [Historical and Cultural Monuments of Grodno region]. Minsk: Беларуская Савецкая Энцыклапедыя імя Петруся Броўкі. p. 174.
