= Church of Saint Wenceslaus, Vawkavysk =

Coordinates: 53°9′32″N 24°28′17″E

Church of Saint Wenceslaus
- Касцёл Святога Вацлава
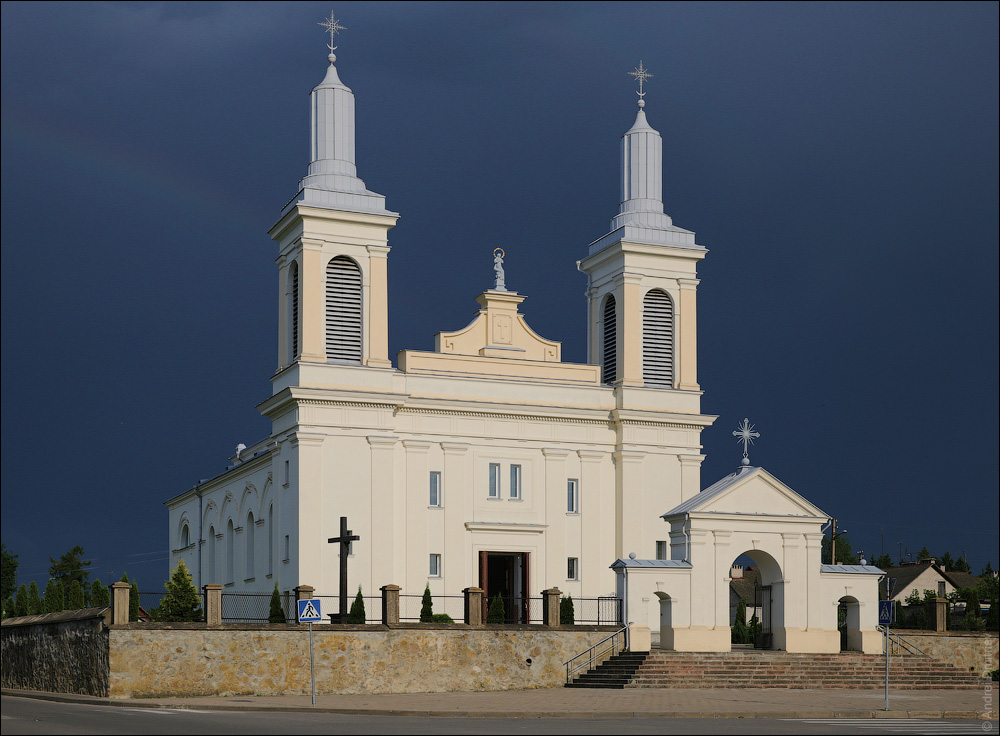
- Church of Saint Wenceslaus
- Location: Vawkavysk
- Country: Belarus
- Denomination: Roman Catholic church

Architecture
- Style: Classicism
- Years built: 1846—1848

Administration
- Diocese: Roman Catholic Diocese of Grodno

The Church of Saint Wenceslaus (Belarusian: Касцёл Святога Вацлава) in Vawkavysk is a Belarusian Catholic church in the Grodno Region. Constructed in 1846–1848, it is now listed as a Belarusian national cultural heritage object.

The first Catholic church in Vawkavysk was built by Vytautas the Great in 1430. It was destroyed during the wars of the 17th century. The new church was constructed in 1846–1848 at the initiative of local priest Jan Lenikovsky. On August 13, 1850, it was consecrated by the Bishop of Vilnius, Wacław Żyliński. In the 1930s, during the Second Polish Republic, it was restored.

== Gallery ==
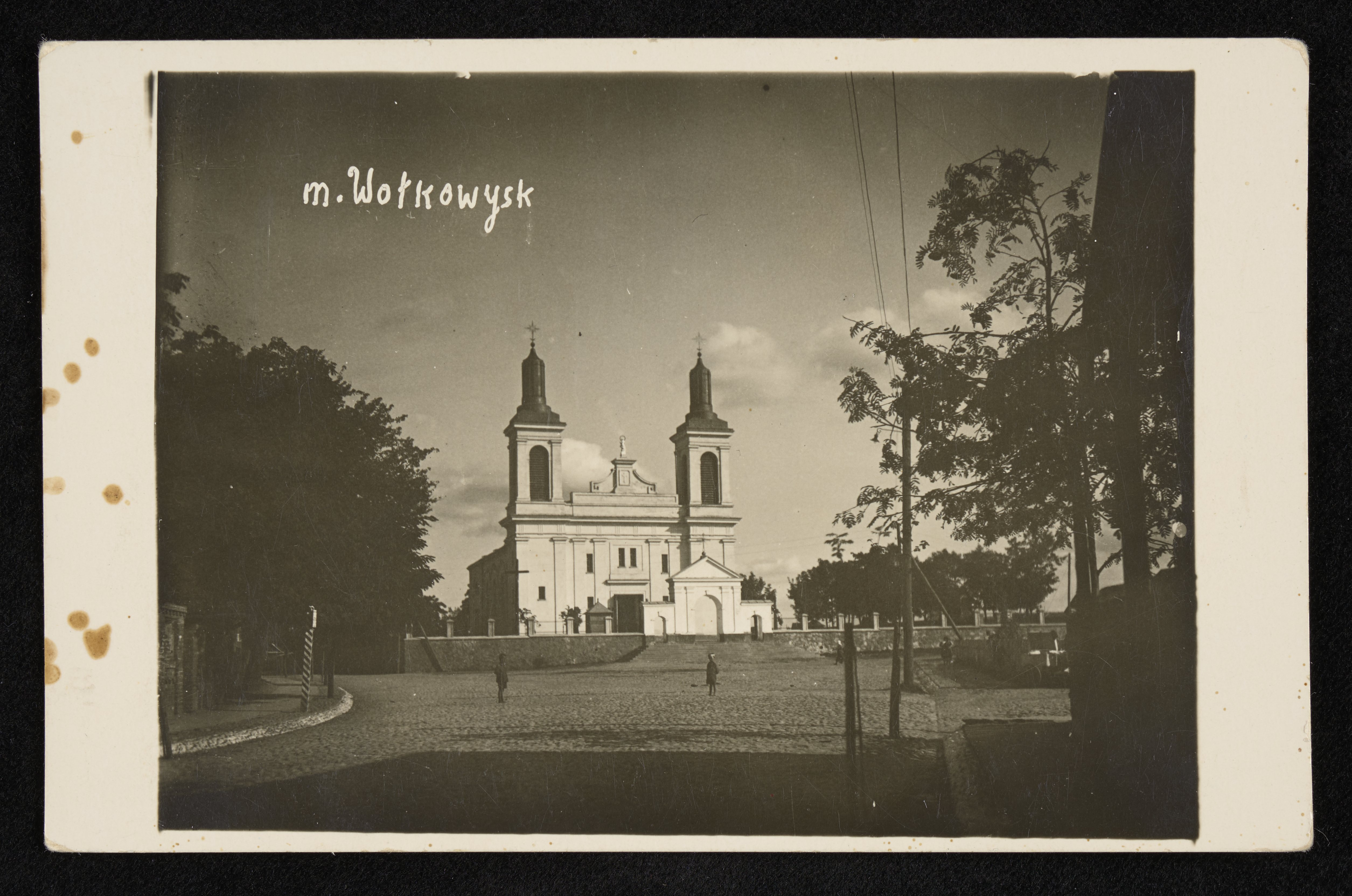
Postcard circa 1939

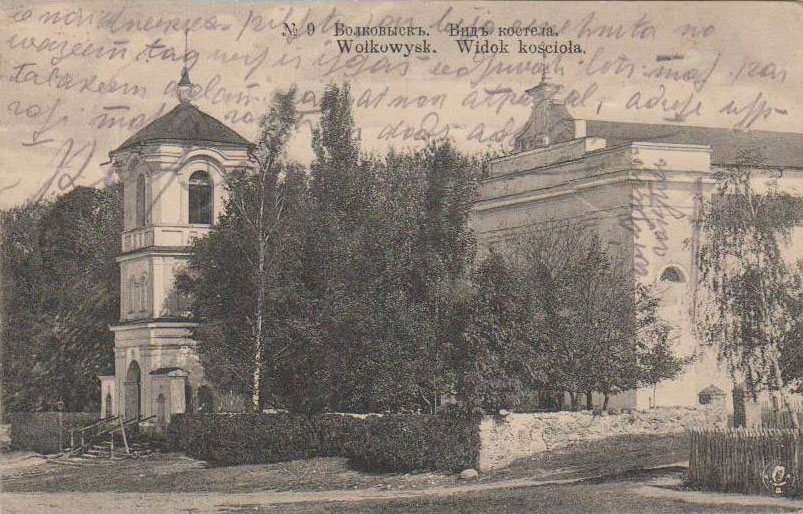
Before 1915

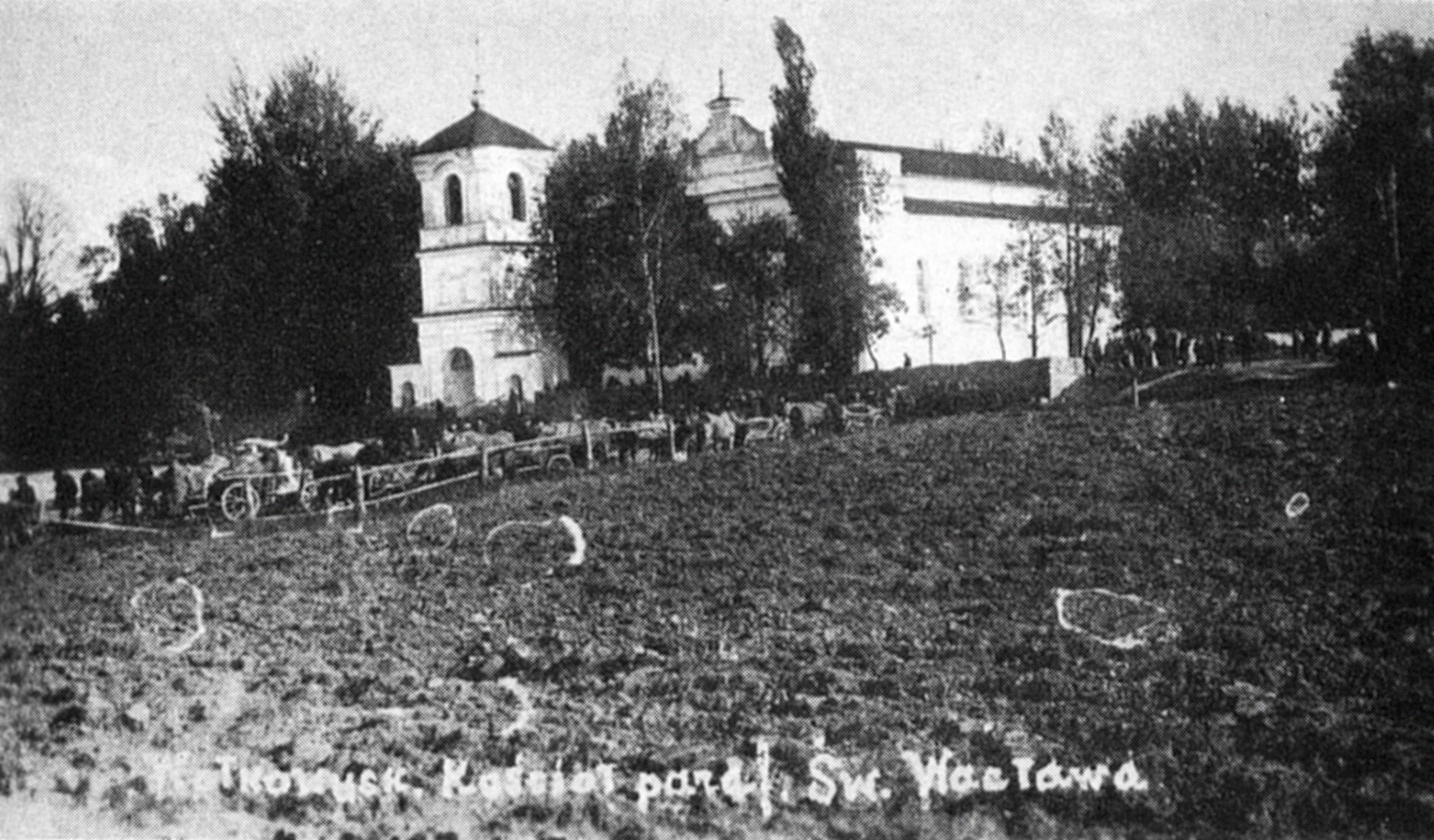
Before 1929

== Sources ==
- Tzerashatova, V. V.; Charnauskaya, T. I. (1986). Збор помнікаў гісторыі і культуры. Гродзенская вобласць [Cultural and Historical Monuments of Grodno region] (in Belarusian). Мінск: Беларуская Савецкая Энцыклапедыя імя Петруся Броўкі. p. 123.
- Tzerashatova, V. V.; Charnauskaya, T. I. (1993). Архітэктура Беларусі [Architecture of Belarus]. Minsk: Беларуская Энцыклапедыя імя Петруся Броўкі. p. 108. ISBN 5-85700-078-5.
