= Aleksander Kaszkiewicz =

- Church: Roman Catholic Church
- Appointed: 13 April 1991

Orders
- Ordination: 30 May 1976 (Priest)
- Consecration: 23 May 1991 (Bishop) by Tadeusz Kondrusiewicz

Personal details
- Born: 23 September 1949 (age 76) Eišiškės, Lithuania SSR

Aleksander Kaszkiewicz (also Alyaksandr Kashkevіch, Belarusian: Аляксандр Кашкевіч, Lithuanian: Aleksandras Kaškevičius; born on 23 September 1949) is the Bishop emeritus of the Diocese of Grodno, a Catholic diocese centered in the city of Grodno (Belarus).

Kaszkiewicz graduated from the Theological Seminary in Kaunas and was ordained to the priesthood on 30 May 1976. After his ordination he worked as a parish priest in Panevėžys and in the parish of the Holy Spirit in Vilnius (from 1981). On 13 April 1991 Pope John Paul II appointed Kaszkiewicz to the newly formed Diocese of Grodno. On 23 May 1991 he was ordained a bishop, consecrated by Archbishop Tadeusz Kondrusiewicz. His episcopal motto is Jesu in te confido (Jesus, I trust in You) taken from the Divine Mercy image.

On 14 June 2006 Kaszkiewicz was elected chairman of the Conference of Catholic Bishops of Belarus. He is also the head of the Council of Youth Affairs and the Council for Catholic Education.

The Vatican announced on 30 September 2024 that the Pope had accepted the resignation of Bishop Kaszkiewicz.
