= Diocese of Grodno =

Roman Catholic diocese in Belarus

Diocese of Grodno Dioecesis Grodnensis Гродзенскай дыяцэзіі

Catholic
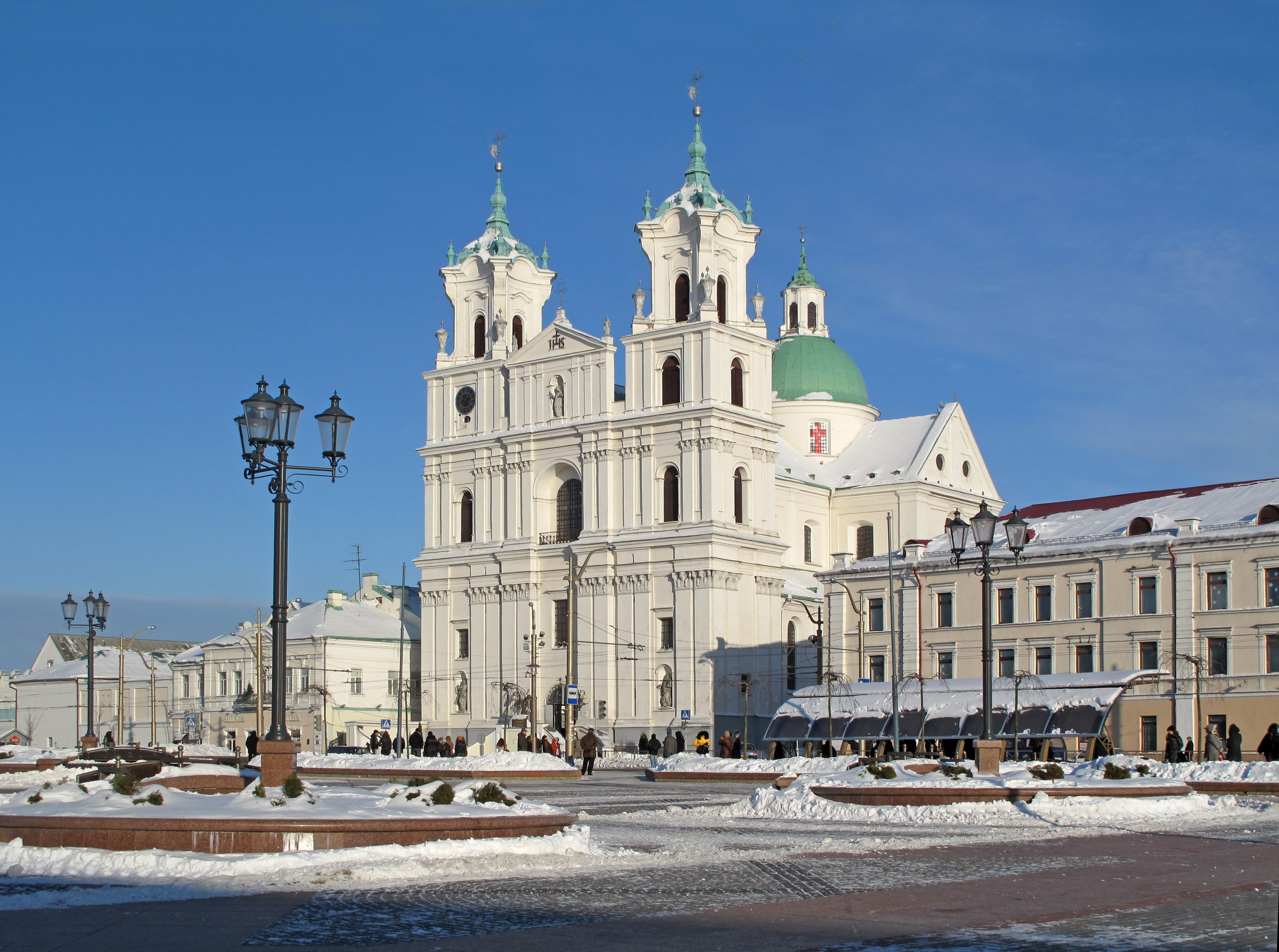
- Cathedral Basilica of St Francis Xavier

Location
- Country: Belarus
- Ecclesiastical province: Minsk-Mohilev
- Metropolitan: Minsk-Mohilev

Statistics
- Area: 25,000 km^{2} (9,700 sq mi)
- Population: Total; Catholics: (as of 2013); 1,058,346; 582,540 (55%)

Information
- Sui iuris church: Latin Church
- Rite: Latin Rite
- Cathedral: св. Францішка Ксаверыя (Cathedral Basilica of St. Francis Xavier)

Current leadership
- Pope: Leo XIV
- Bishop: Aleksander Kaszkiewicz
- Metropolitan Archbishop: Tadeusz Kondrusiewicz

Map
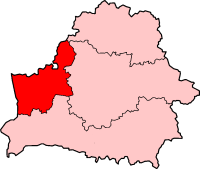
- Location of Diocese of Grodno in Belarus

Website
- Website of the Diocese

The Diocese of Grodno (Latin: Grodnen(sis) Latinorum, Belarusian: Гродзенская дыяцэзія, romanized: Hrodzienskaja dyjacezija, Polish: Diecezja grodzieńska) is a Latin Church diocese of the Catholic Church located in the city of Grodno in the ecclesiastical province of Minsk-Mohilev in Belarus.

== History ==
On 13 April 1991, the Diocese of Grodno was established from the Archdiocese of Vilnius.

In 1994, the diocesan Caritas organisation (Belarusian: Карытас Гродзенскай дыяцэзіі) was registered with the State, although it had been operational since 1990.

== Leadership ==
- Bishops of Grodno (Roman rite)
  - Aleksander Kaszkiewicz (Аляксандр Кашкевіч) (since 13 Apr 1991)

== Churches ==
- Church of Saint Anthony of Padua (Dwarec) in Dwarec
- Church of Saint Wenceslaus in Vawkavysk
- Church of the Assumption in Dzyatlava

== See also ==
- Roman Catholicism in Belarus
- List of Roman Catholic dioceses in Belarus

== Sources ==
- GCatholic.org
- Catholic Hierarchy
