= Roman Catholic Archdiocese of Minsk–Mohilev =

Latin Catholic ecclesiastical territory in Belarus

Coordinates: 53.9032°N 27.5547°E

Metropolitan Archdiocese of Minsk–Mohilev Archidioecesis Metropolitae Minscensis–Mohiloviensis Latinorum Мінска–Магілёўская архідыяцэзія Мітрапаліт

Catholic
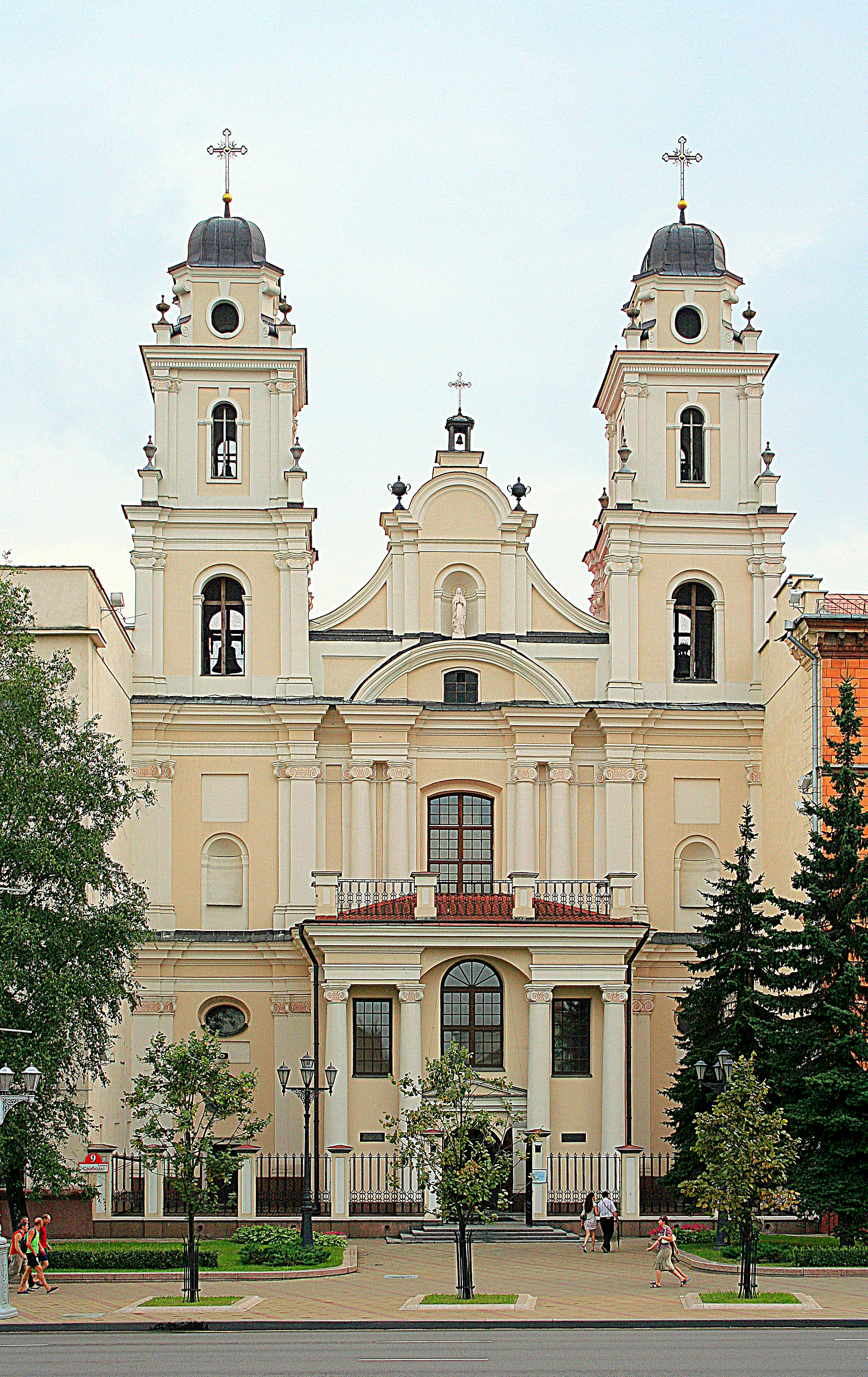
- Cathedral of the Blessed Virgin Mary, Minsk

Location
- Country: Belarus
- Ecclesiastical province: Minsk–Mohilev

Statistics
- Area: 69,800 km^{2} (26,900 sq mi)
- Population: Total; Catholics: (as of 2013); 4,709,000; 610,000 (13%)

Information
- Denomination: Catholic Church
- Sui iuris church: Latin Church
- Rite: Roman Rite
- Cathedral: Cathedral of the Holy Name of the Blessed Virgin Mary, Minsk
- Co-cathedral: Cathedral of the Assumption of the Blessed Virgin and St. Anthony, Mohilev

Current leadership
- Pope: Leo XIV
- Metropolitan Archbishop: Josephus Romualdovitsche Stanevskiej
- Auxiliary Bishops: Juri Kasabutski; Aliaksandr Yasheuski
- Bishops emeritus: Tadevuš Kandrusievič

Map
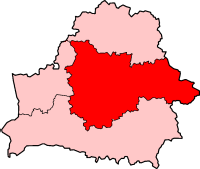
- Location of the Archdiocese of Minsk–Mohilev in Belarus

The Metropolitan Archdiocese of Minsk–Mohilev (Belarusian: Мінска–Магілёўская архідыяцэзія Мітрапаліт, romanized: Minska-Mahilowskaja archidyjacesija Mitrapalit) is a Latin Church ecclesiastical territory or archdiocese of the Catholic Church covering the cities of Minsk and Mogilev in Belarus. It is a metropolitan see with three suffragan dioceses.

== History ==
- 9 August 1798: established as Diocese of Minsk from the Diocese of Vilnius and the Diocese of Lutsk, suffragan of the Metropolitan Archdiocese of Mohilev
- 1869-1882: territory of Minsk administrated by the Bishop of Vilnius, Adam Stanisław Krasiński
- 1882-1917: territory administrated by the Archbishops of Mohilev.
- 13 April 1991: elevated to Metropolitan Archdiocese of Minsk – Mohilev for the union with the Archdiocese of Mohilev
- 1991: establishment of the diocesan Caritas (Belarusian: Карытас Мінска-Магілёўскай архідыяцэзіі

== Special churches ==
- Minor Basilicas:
  - National Sanctuary of the Mother of God of Budslau, Budslau
- Church of Saint Barbara in Zamoscie
- Church of the Assumption of the Blessed Virgin Mary in Mstsislaw

== Leadership ==
- Archbishops of Minsk-Mohilev:
  - Archbishop Iosif Staneŭski (14 September 2021 – present)
  - Archbishop Tadeusz Kondrusiewicz (21 September 2007 – 3 January 2021)
  - Bishop Antoni Dziamjanka (Антонi Дзям'янка) (Apostolic Administrator 14 June 2006 – 21 September 2007)
  - Cardinal Kazimierz Świątek (Казімір Свёнтак) (13 April 1991 – 14 June 2006)
- Bishops of Minsk:
  - Archbishop Tadevuš Kandrusievič (Apostolic Administrator 10 May 1989 – 13 April 1991)
  - Bishop Boļeslavs Sloskāns (Apostolic Administrator 13 August 1926 – 18 April 1981)
  - Bishop Zygmunt Łoziński (2 November 1917 – 28 October 1925)

For the Bishops of Minsk between 1798 and 1869 see Roman Catholic Diocese of Minsk.

For the Archbishops of Mohilev see Roman Catholic Archdiocese of Mohilev.

== Suffragan dioceses ==
- Grodno
- Pinsk
- Vitebsk

== See also ==
- Roman Catholicism in Belarus
- Church of Saint Virgin Mary (Rakaŭ)
