= Church of the Assumption of the Blessed Virgin Mary, Budslaw =

The Minor Basilica of the Assumption of the Blessed Virgin Mary
- Касцёл Унебаўзяцця Найсвяцейшай Дзевы Марыі
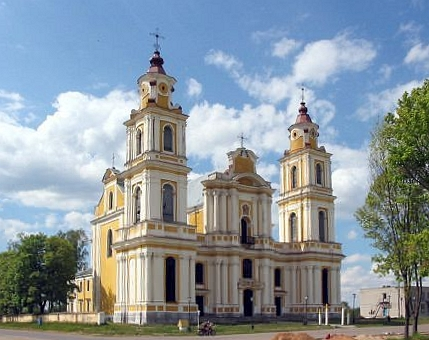
- The Minor Basilica of the Assumption of the Blessed Virgin Mary
- 54°47′13″N 27°27′5″E
- Location: Budslaw, Myadzyel Raion, Minsk Region
- Country: Belarus
- Denomination: Roman Catholic
- Website: http://site.catholic.by/budslau/

History
- Status: Parish church

Architecture
- Functional status: Active
- Architect: K. Pens
- Style: Late Baroque
- Completed: 1783

The Church of the Assumption of the Blessed Virgin Mary (Belarusian: Касцёл Унебаўзяцця Найсвяцейшай Дзевы Марыі, Polish: Bazylika Wniebowzięcia Najświętszej Maryi Panny w Budsławiu) is a former Bernardine, now parish Catholic Church of the Archdiocese of Minsk-Mohilev in Budslaw, Myadzyel District, Minsk Region, Belarus. The church is a monument of architecture of the late Baroque, and enshrines the icon of Our Lady of Budslau widely venerated in the country.

The church is included as a UNESCO World Heritage Site.

== History ==
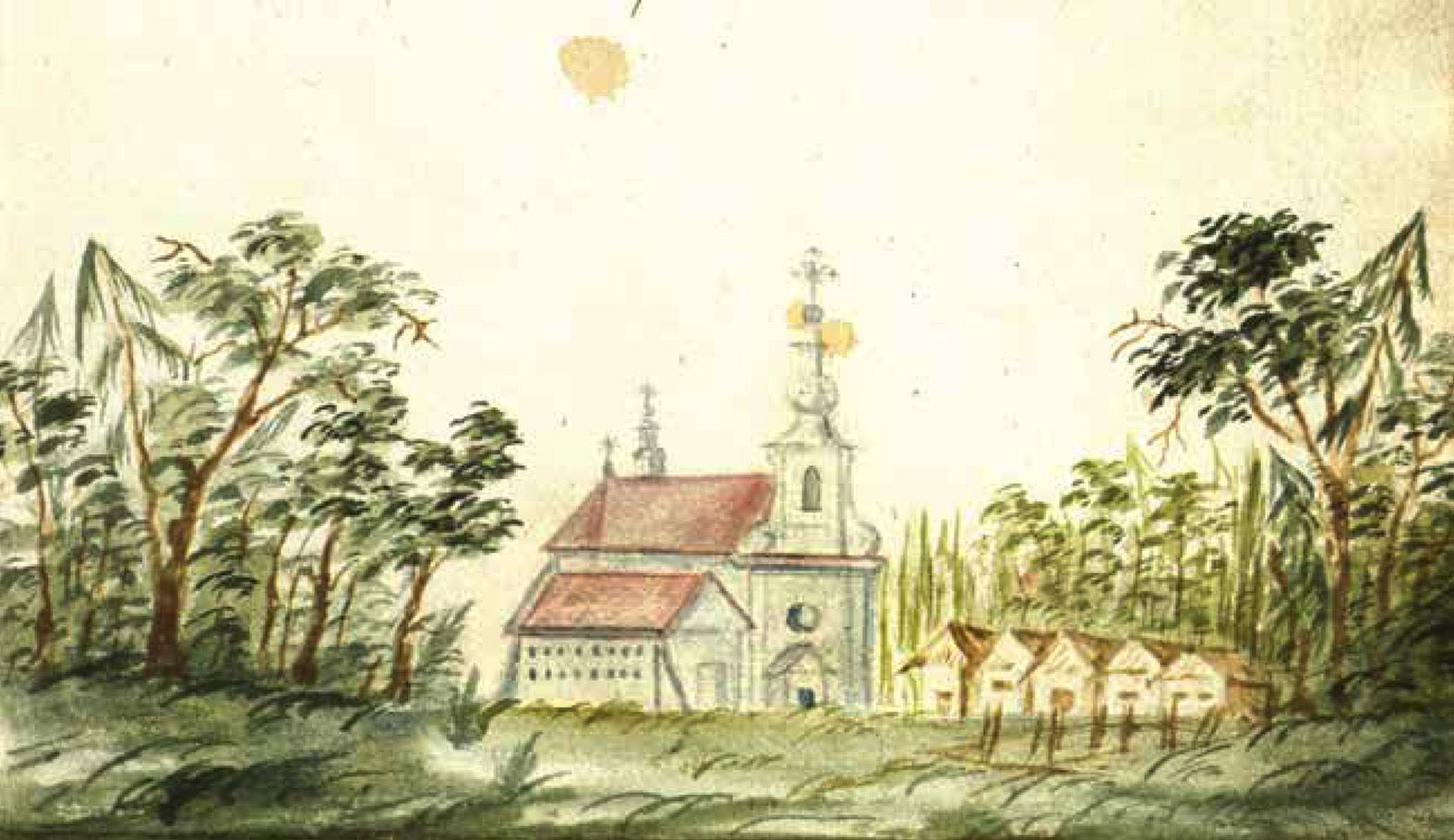
Bernardine Monastery, 1769

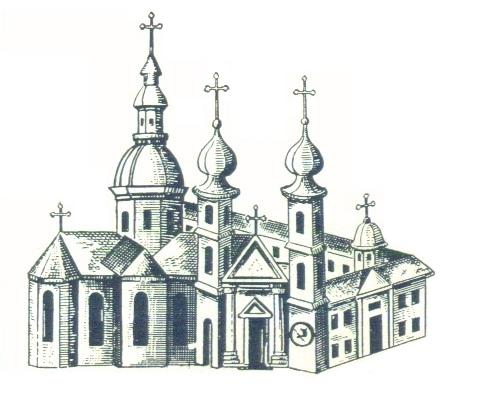
Bernardine Monastery, a pictographic map of the 18th century

First time the church was mentioned in documents in 1504, when Grand Duke Alexander granted Vilnius Bernardines 6000 morgens of forest in the Minsk district. Monks lived for 2–4 people in the buildings; they also had a chapel.

In 1591, a wooden church of Visitation was built, in which there was the miraculous icon of the Mother of Our Lady, the last was brought by Jan Dominikowicz Pac from Rome (a gift from Pope Clement VIII) in 1598 and transferred to the church in 1613. In 1643 a new church was built on money donated by Janusz Kiszka. According to the monastery's yearbooks, the German stonemason from Polotsk Andreas Kromer headed the construction. Another master, Peter Gramel, crafted a two-level altar. During the Russo-Polish of 1654–1667, the valuable icon was evacuated to Sokółka and returned to the church in the 1670s. Around 16 monks lived near the church.

In 1750, a philanthropist Barbara Skorulska donated money to build new residential housing for the monks. The construction of a new stone church was started on June 29, 1767; some walls of the 17th century chapel were used for it. In 1783 the church was consecrated in honor of the Dormition of the Mother of God. Since 1756 there was a music school at the monastery, also established thanks to the donation of Barbara Skorulska.

In 1771, a master from Vilnius Nikolaus Jantzen created the pipe organ for the church. Jantzen is the best-known representative of Baroque pipe organ school. He crafted unique 20-register two-manual pipe organs without pedals, as dictated by fashion of his time.

In 1793–1842, a two-year school and a hospital worked in the monastery. In 1731–1797, the moral theology and rhetoric was studied in the theological school; about 4–17 people lived there.

The monastery was closed in 1852, some of his monks took part in the January Uprising 1863–1864. The church, though, remained working. According to the yearbooks, various priests served the masses until 1937, then in 1954–1966.

The house of the priest of the 19th century is preserved near the temple.

== Minor Basilica ==
Pope John Paul II issued a Pontifical decree Inter Parœciales Aedes that raised the shrine to the status of Minor Basilica on 13 June 1993. On 7 June 1995, the icon of Our Lady was granted a Pontifical decree of coronation. The image was crowned in 1998.

The unique pipe organ with an autograph of the master is still preserved in the church; only two registers were lost during the centuries.

On May 11, 2021, a fire broke out in the church and destroyed its roof. The vaults also significantly damaged. The parish initiated crowdfunding to restore the temple, the French Embassy in Belarus also contributed to the project. By October 2021 a temporary roof was constructed and the authorities announced that masses would soon be served at the church.

== Architecture ==
The church is a three-nave two-towered basilica without apse with a transept. The main facade with two towers on the sides decorated with rich plastics: pilasters, engaged columns. The interior is covered with barrel vaults. A spherical dome is located at the intersection of the main nave and the transept. In the chapel of St. Barbara carved wooden altar of the Annunciation of the Blessed Virgin Mary is located (around 1643). It is considered to be one of the most outstanding early Baroque monuments in Belarus. The back sides of the altar are resolved in a Corinthian colonnade, which serves as the scenes for 20 sculptures. The excellent frescoes of the church survived to our time without later changes.

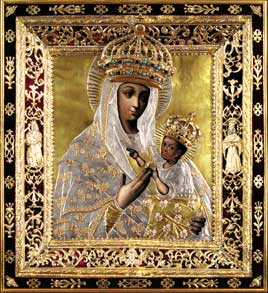
Budslau icon of Our Lady

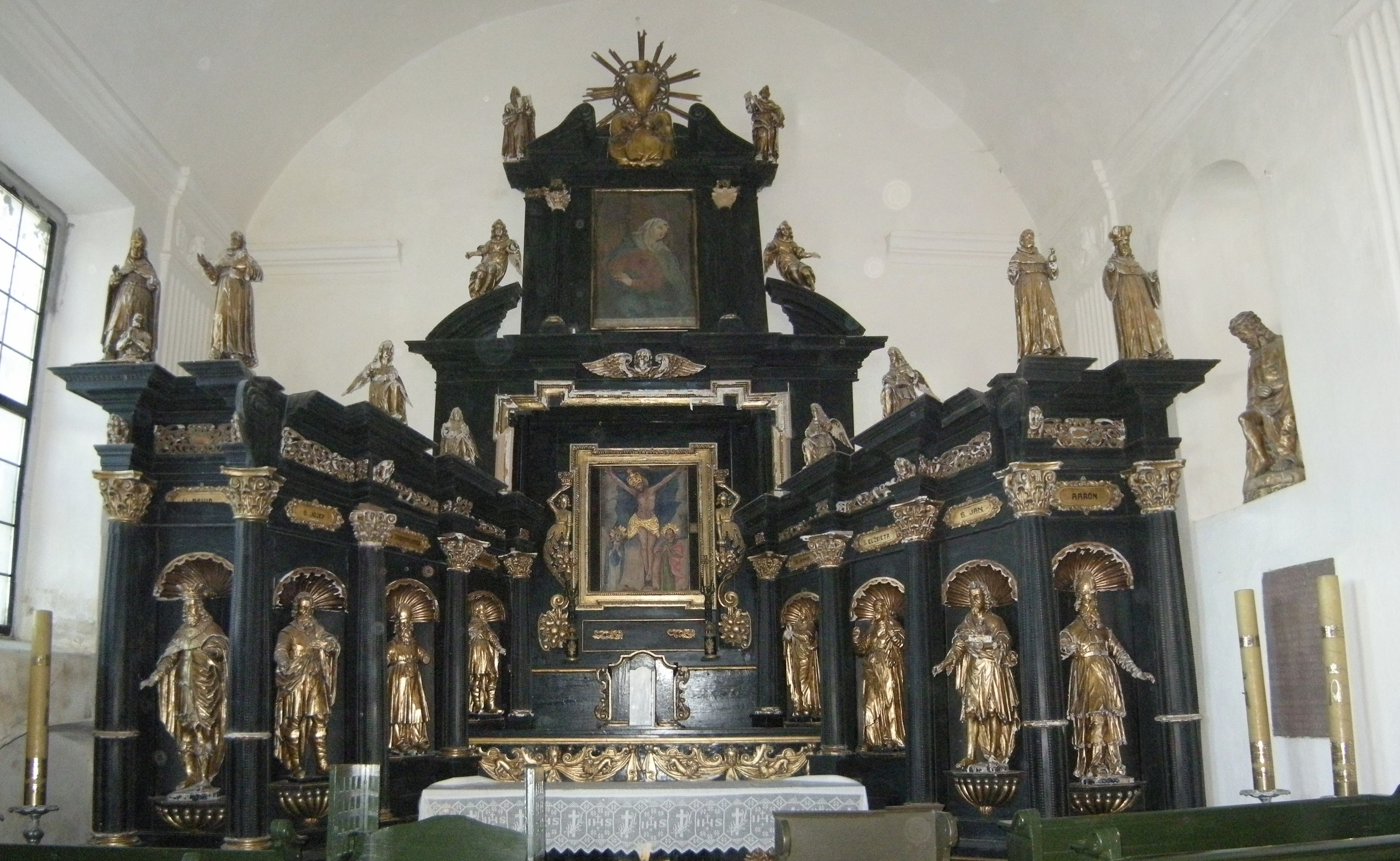
Wooden side altar of the Annunciation of the Blessed Virgin Mary, 17th century

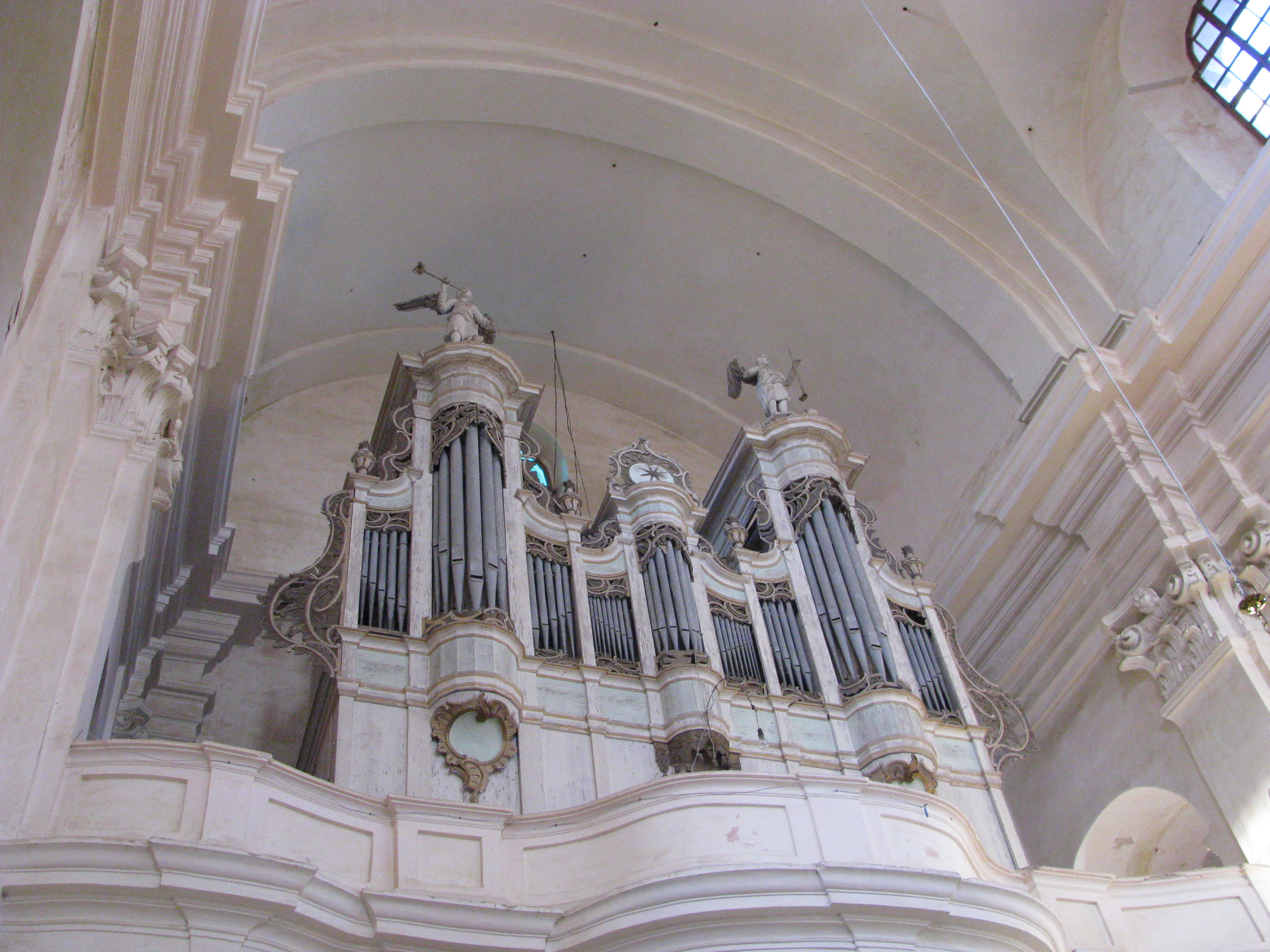
The pipe organ, 2010

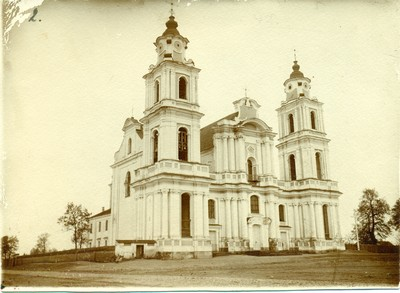
The church in 1915

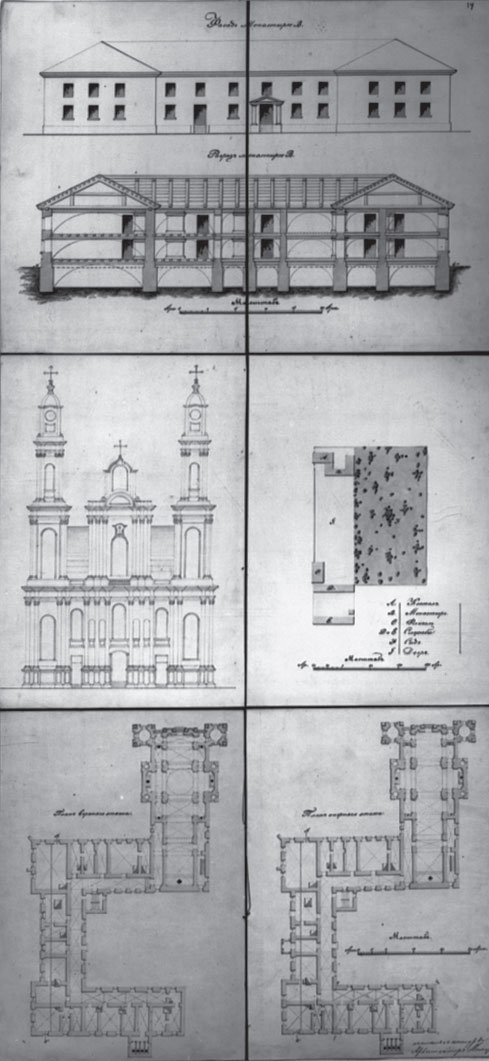
Construction scheme

== Literature ==
- Дзяржаўны спіс гісторыка-культурных каштоўнасцей Рэспублікі Беларусь: [Даведнік] / Склад. В. Я. Абламскі, І. М. Чарняўскі, Ю. А. Барысюк — Мн.: БЕЛТА, 2009. — 684 с. — ISBN 978-985-6828-35-8.
- Ярашэвіч А. А. Будслаўская базіліка Унебаўзяцця Найсвяцейшай Панны Марыі. — Мінск, 2005.
- Габрусь Т. В. Мураваныя харалы: Сакральная архітэктура беларускага барока / Т. В. Габрусь. Мн.: Ураджай, 2001.— 287 с.: іл. ISBN 985-04-0499-X, с. 238–240.
