= Church of the Assumption, Dzyatlava =

Church of the Assumption
- Касцёл Унебаўзяцця Найсвяцейшай Панны Марыі
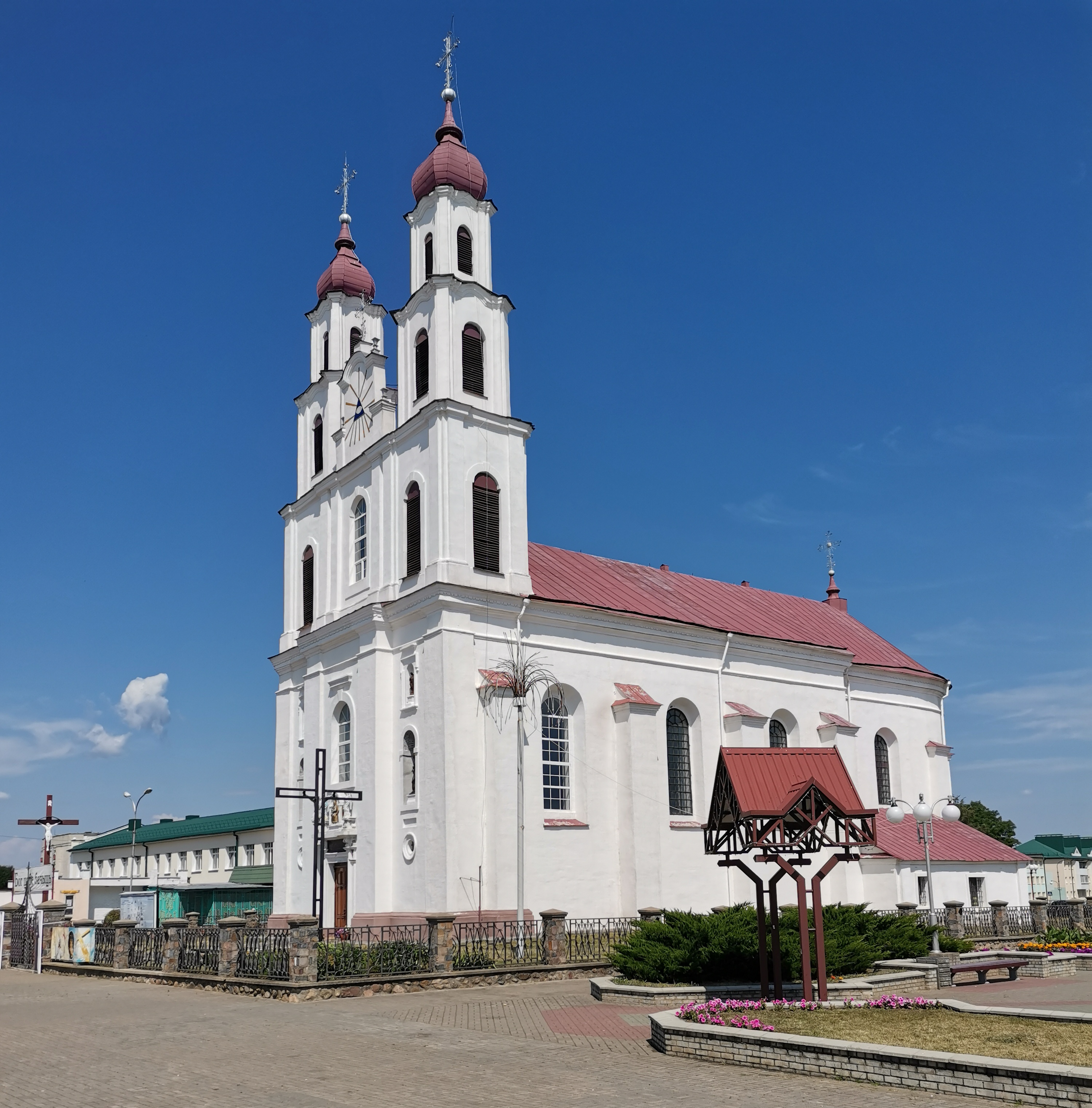
- Church of the Assumption
- 53°27′55″N 25°24′19″E
- Location: Dzyatlava
- Country: Belarus
- Denomination: Roman Catholic church

History
- Founder: Lew Sapieha

Architecture
- Style: Vilnian Baroque
- Years built: 1624—1646

Administration
- Diocese: Roman Catholic Diocese of Grodno

Church of the Assumption in Dzyatlava is a Catholic church in Belarus, built in 1624–1646 in Vilnian Baroque style. Nowadays the church is listed as a Belarusian Cultural Heritage object.

== History ==
The church was built in 1624–1646 by order of Lew Sapieha on a market square and replaced an older wooden church. It was destroyed by fire in 1743, all interiors and churchware were lost. In 1751 Mikołaj Faustyn Radziwiłł donated money for reconstruction. The architect A. Osikevich rebuilt the church in Vilnian Baroque style. Another fire damaged the roof in 1882. In 1900 the church's territory was fenced by a high stone wall with towers.

== Gallery ==
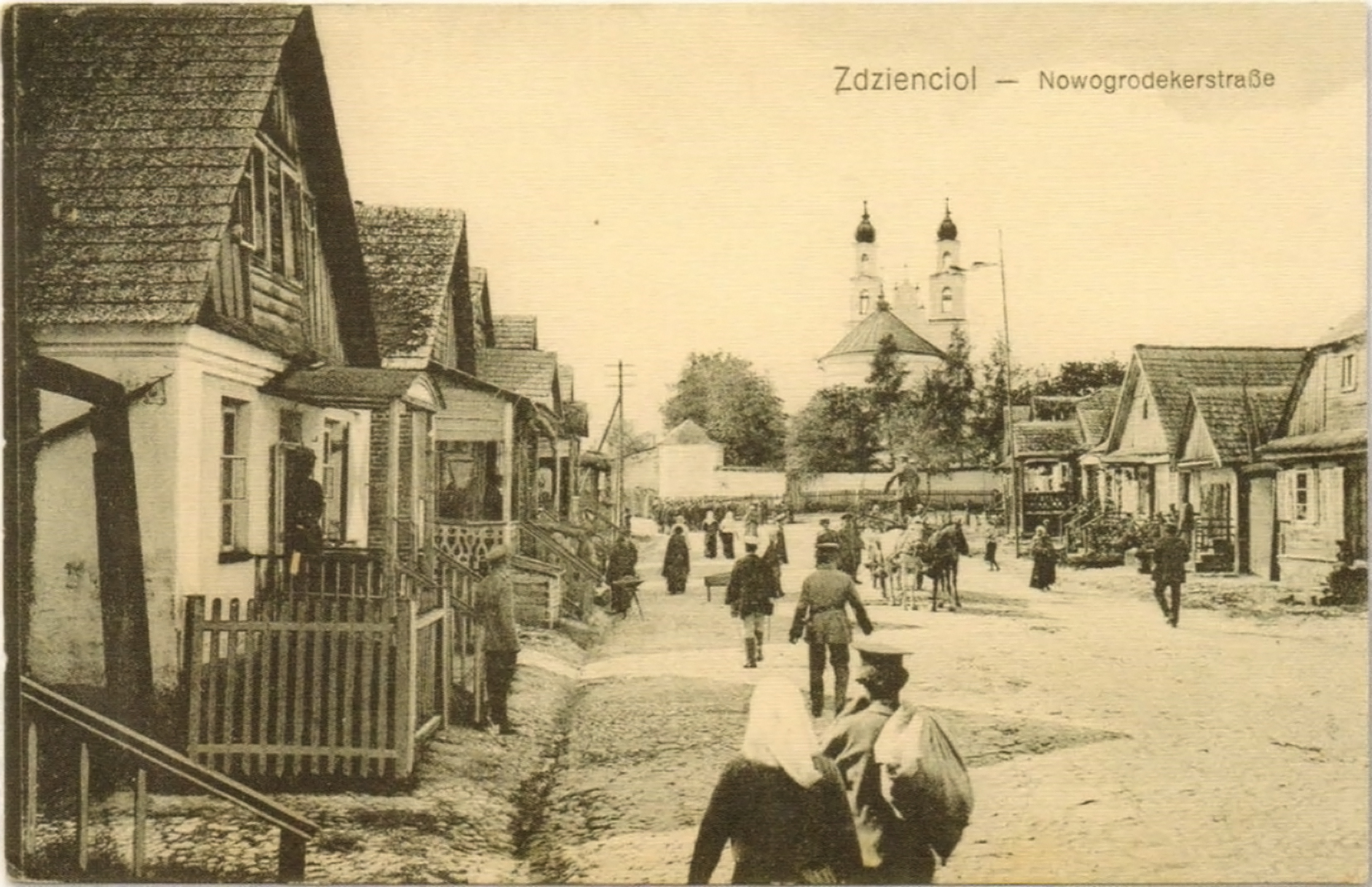
Dzyatlava in 1916

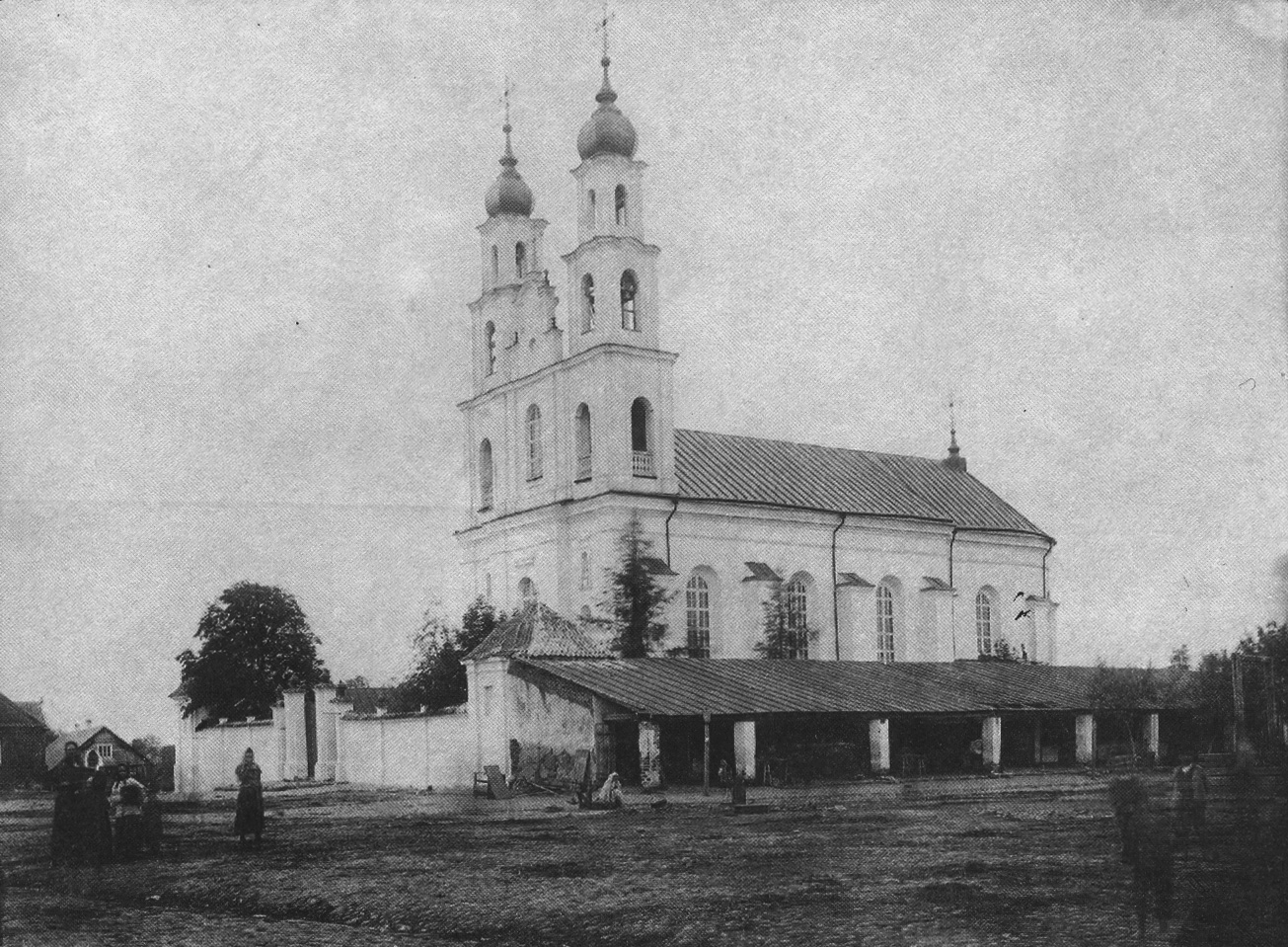
The church circa 1900

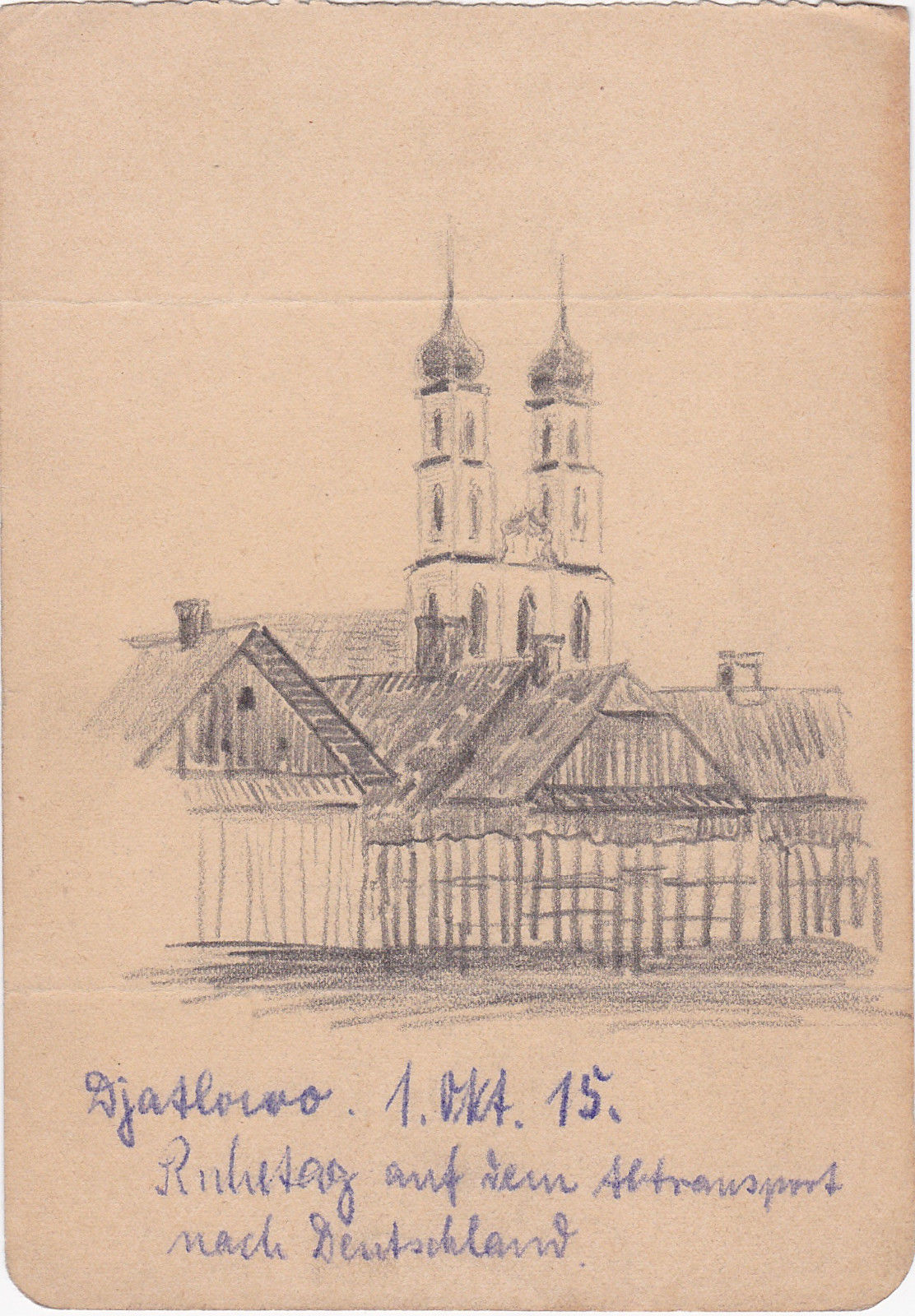
Painting by unknown author, 1915

== Sources ==
- Mitzianin, A. A.; Tzerashchatova, V. V. (1986). Збор помнікаў гісторыі і культуры. Гродзенская вобласць [Cultural heritage monuments of Grodno region]. Minsk: Беларуская Савецкая Энцыклапедыя імя Петруся Броўкі. pp. 169–170.
