= Church of the Assumption of the Blessed Virgin Mary, Mstsislaw =

Church of the Assumption of the Blessed Virgin Mary
- Касцёл Унебаўзяцця Найсвяцейшай Дзевы Марыі
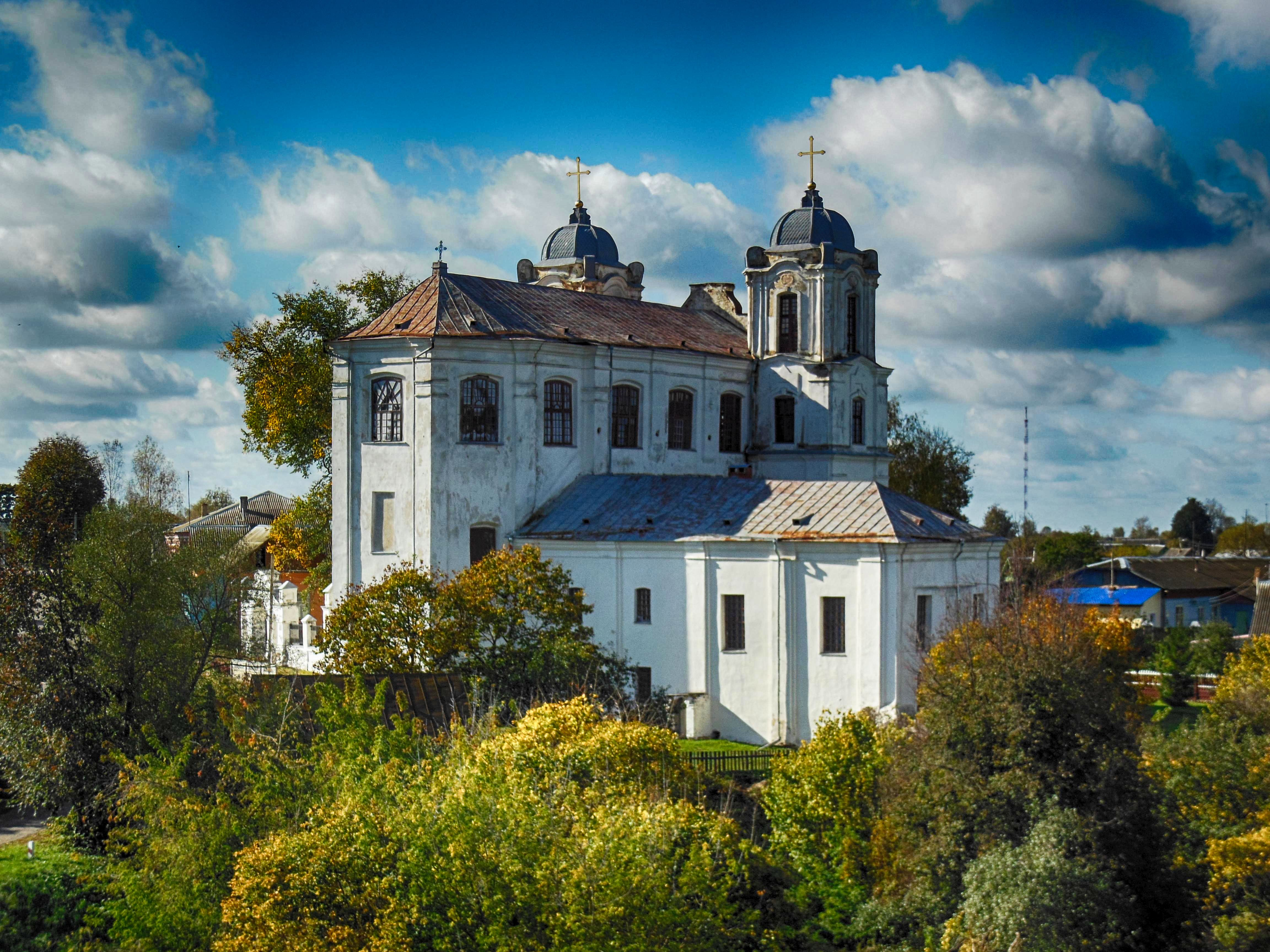
- Church of the Assumption of the Blessed Virgin Mary
- 54.0239°N 31.7268°E
- Location: Mstsislaw
- Country: Belarus
- Denomination: Roman Catholic church

Architecture
- Architect: Johann Christoph Glaubitz (reconstruction in 1746–1750)
- Years built: 1617–1637

Administration
- Diocese: Roman Catholic Archdiocese of Minsk–Mohilev

Church of the Assumption of the Blessed Virgin Mary (Polish: Kościół Wniebowzięcia Najświętszej Marii Panny) in Mstsislaw is a Belarusian Cultural Heritage object, built in 1617–1637 and restored in 1746–1750 by Johann Christoph Glaubitz. It is considered the most valuable historical monument of Mstsislaw. The church was originally constructed for Carmelite monastery and consecrated in honour of the Blessed Virgin Mary only in the 18th century after restoration.

== History ==
The Carmelite monastery was established at the footstep of Zamkovaya hill in Mstsislaw in the early 17th century. The king Sigismund III Vasa allowed the order to establish its parish and build a first wooden church as early as in 1614. In 1638 the Carmelites received lands for construction of a stone church from the city government, but they didn't like the site and changed in for lands closer to the Zamkovaya hill. The papers were signed on December 7, 1640.

The church was constructed in a basilica shape with two towers and a five-canted altar apse, flanked by a rectangular side wing with a sacristy and a small chapel on the first floor. The second floor was given to the monastery's library. The interiors were decorated with frescoes; a pipe organ was installed on the second floor.

During the Russo-Polish war, in 1654 Russian soldiers besieged and then conquered Mstsislaw. They attacked the monastery and killed all Carmelite monks. The memory of the massacre is depicted in one of the church's frescoes. After the war the church was restored but then significantly damaged by fires in 1691 and 1712.

In 1938 the church was closed and later used as a warehouse. Most of the original frescoes were destroyed.

In the 1970–1980s the foundations, vaultings, roof and towers were strengthened, but the restoration stalled due to lack of funds and the interiors were left untouched.

== 21st century ==
There are 20 valuable medieval frescoes with scenes from the Bible and secular life still preserved in the church. In 2021 the contemporary researchers have found out that a part of the vault that crashed in the 19th century is still in the basement of the church; it was conserved and had never been previously examined. The scientists hope to find frescoes that were thought to be lost.

== Gallery ==
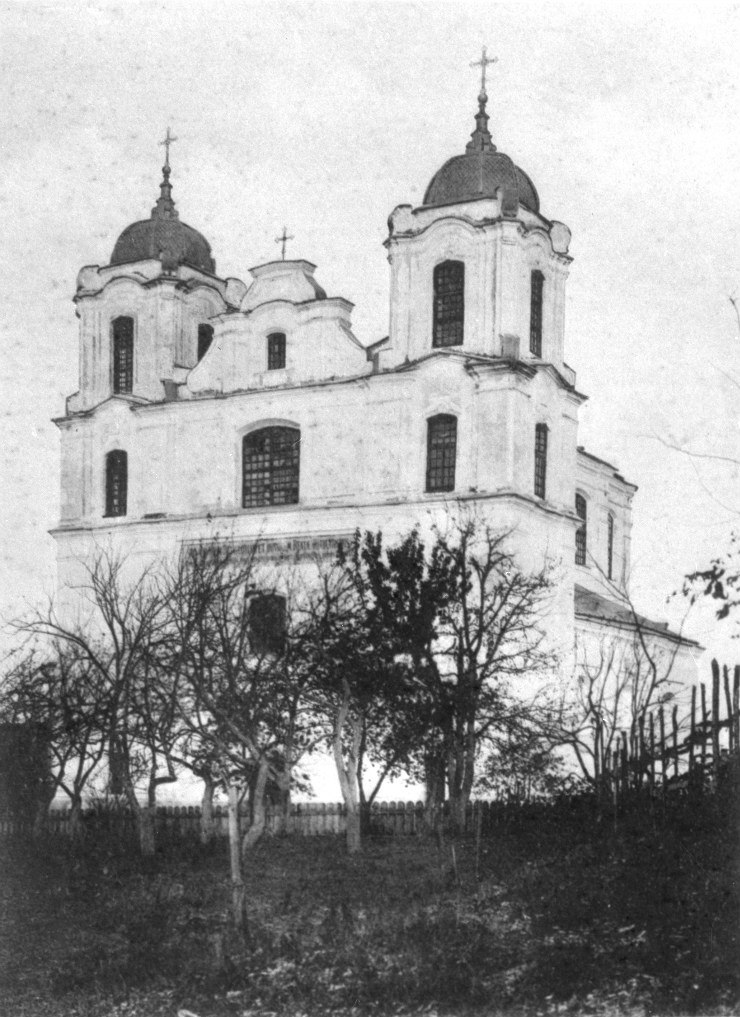
Photo before 1912

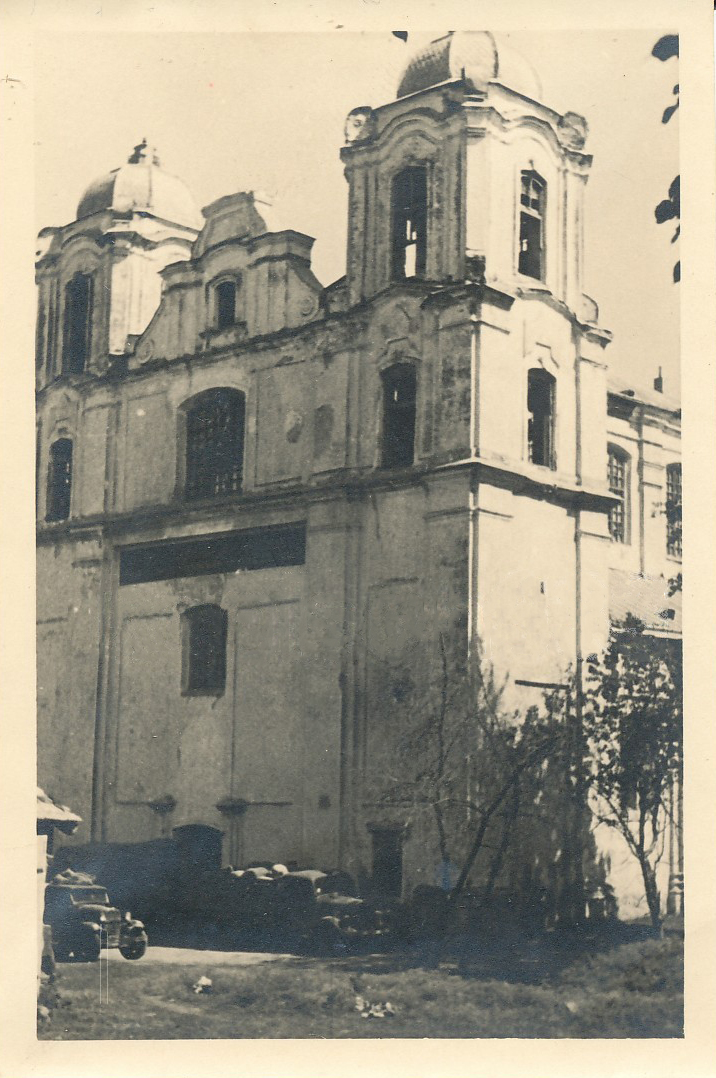
Photo made between 1941 and 1944

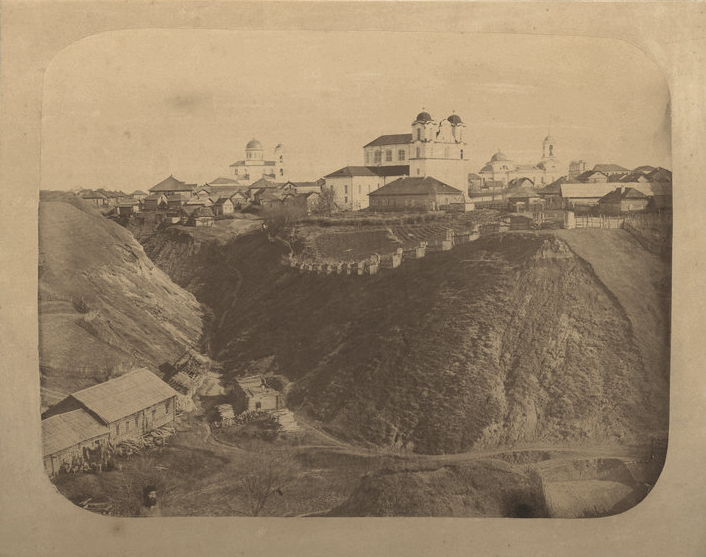
Troitzkaya hill in the 1860s

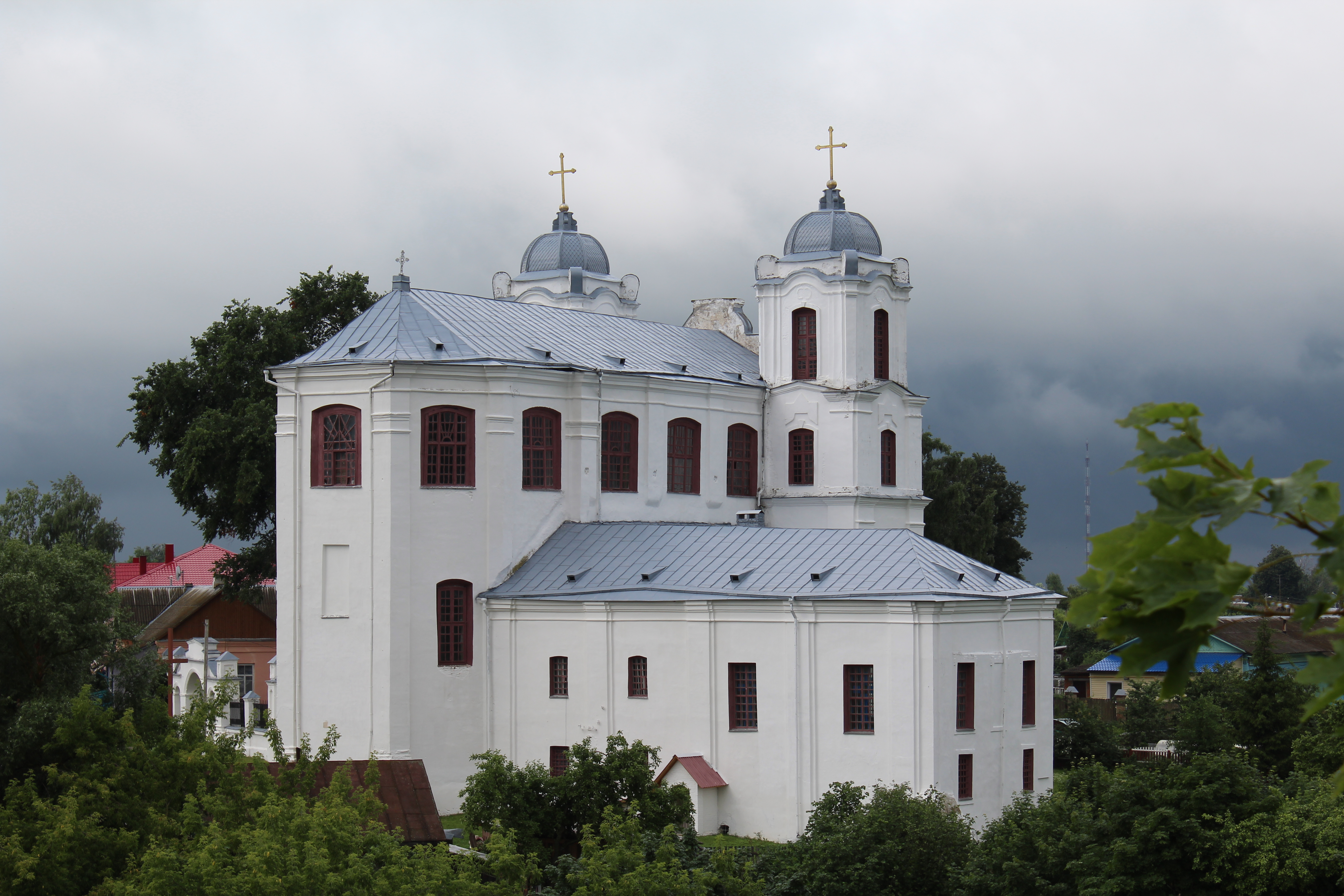
The restored church in 2017

== Sources ==
- Metelsky, A. A. (2018). Костёлы Мстиславля: история, состояние и перспективы использования [Mstsislaw Churches: history, conditions and perspectives] (PDF). History of Architecture and City Planning (in Russian). Actual problems of Belarusian Daugava region architectureпривл. pp. 89–96.
- Kulagin, A. M.; Tzerashchatova, V. V. (1986). Збор помнікаў гісторыі і культуры. Магілёўская вобласць [Collection of Cultural Heritage monuments in Mogilev region]. Minsk: Беларуская Савецкая Энцыклапедыя імя Петруся Броўкі. p. 305.
