= Church of Saint Barbara (Zamoscie) =

Church in Minsk Region, Belarus

Coordinates: 53°12′26″N 27°35′45″E

- Касцёл Святой Барбары
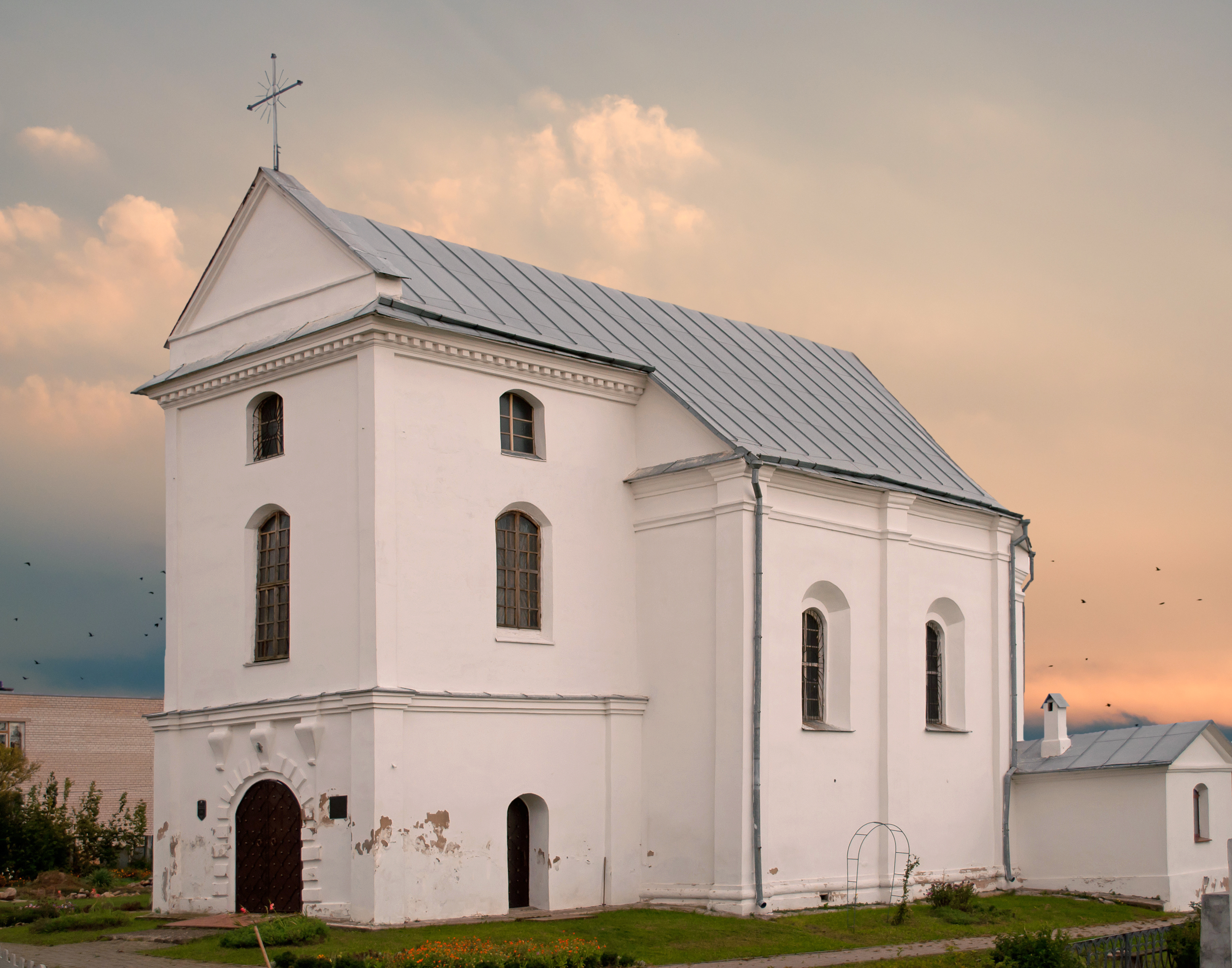
- Church of Saint Barbara
- Location: Zamoscie (Slutsk District)
- Country: Belarus
- Denomination: Roman Catholic church

Architecture
- Style: Renaissance
- Completed: 1620

Administration
- Diocese: Roman Catholic Archdiocese of Minsk–Mohilev

The Church of Saint Barbara in Zamoscie is a Catholic church in Belarus built in 1620. It is currently listed as part of the cultural heritage of Belarus.

The church was built with donations from the local nobleman Andrej Samuil Vinki-Ratomski. According to some historians, at first it belonged to the Calvinists, but was re-consecrated in the aftermath of the January Uprising.

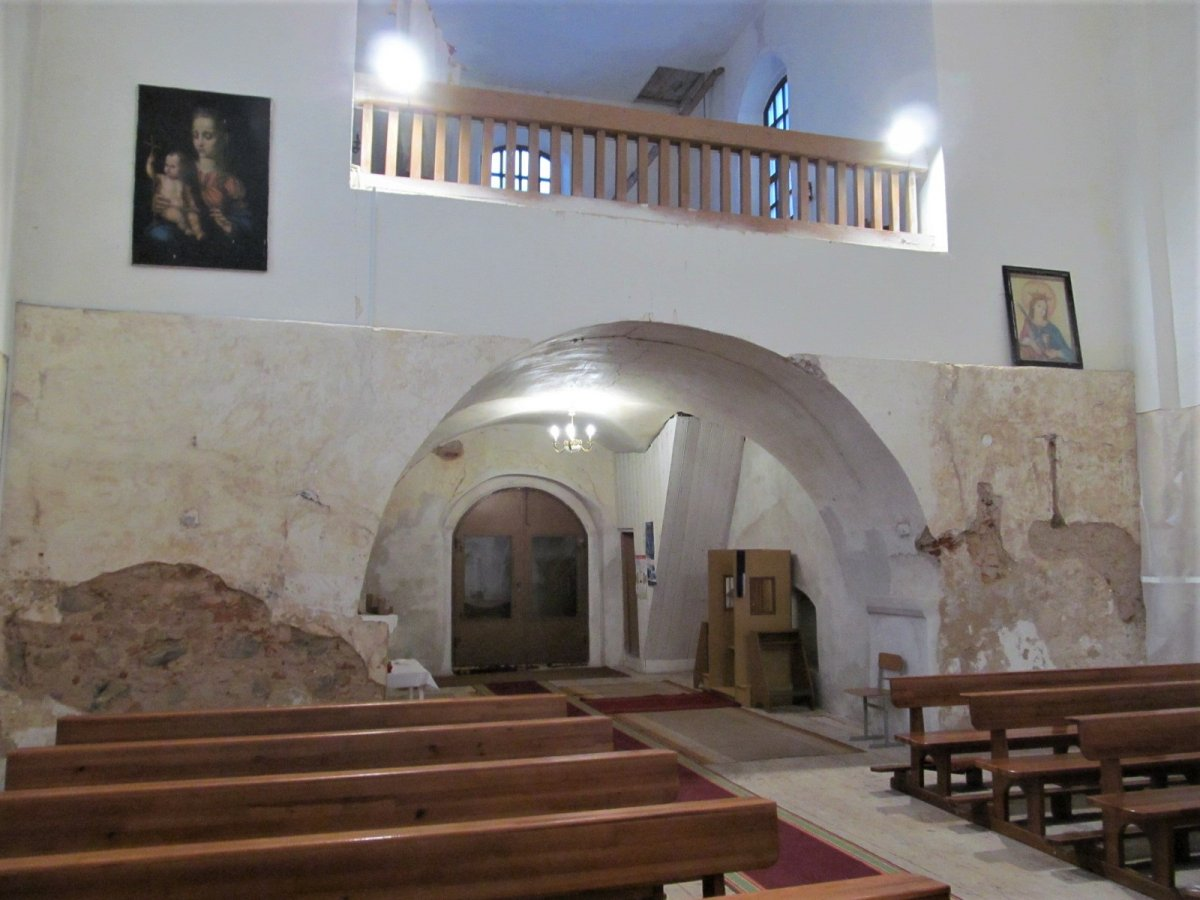
The interior, 2017

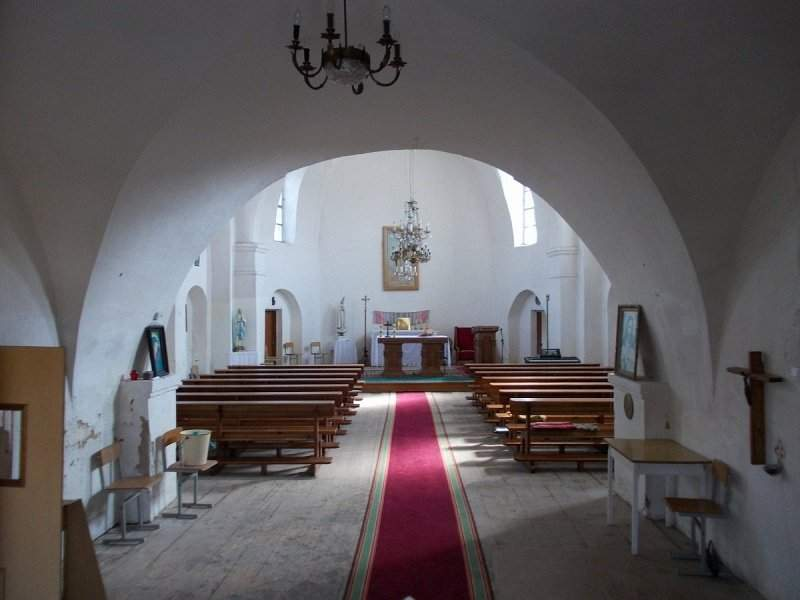
The church in 2014

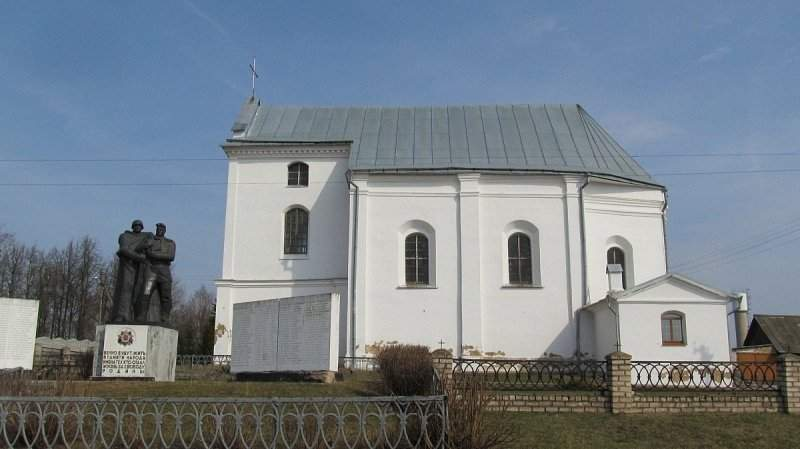
Street view, 2014

== Sources ==
- Yaroshevich, A. A. (1993). Архітэктура Беларусі. Энцыклапедычны даведнік [Encyclopedia Architecture of Belarus]. Minsk: «Беларуская Энцыклапедыя імя Петруся Броўкі». p. 219. ISBN 5-85700-078-5.
- Gabrus, T. V. (2007). Саборы помняць усё. Готыка і рэнесанс у сакральным дойлідстве Беларусі Замостье, костел св. Варвары [Church of Saint Barbara in Zamoscie]. Minsk. p. 144. ISBN 978-985-01-0714-5.
