= Budslaw =

Agrotown in Minsk Region, Belarus

Budslaw: Будслаў (Belarusian); Будслав (Russian); Budsław
- Agrotown
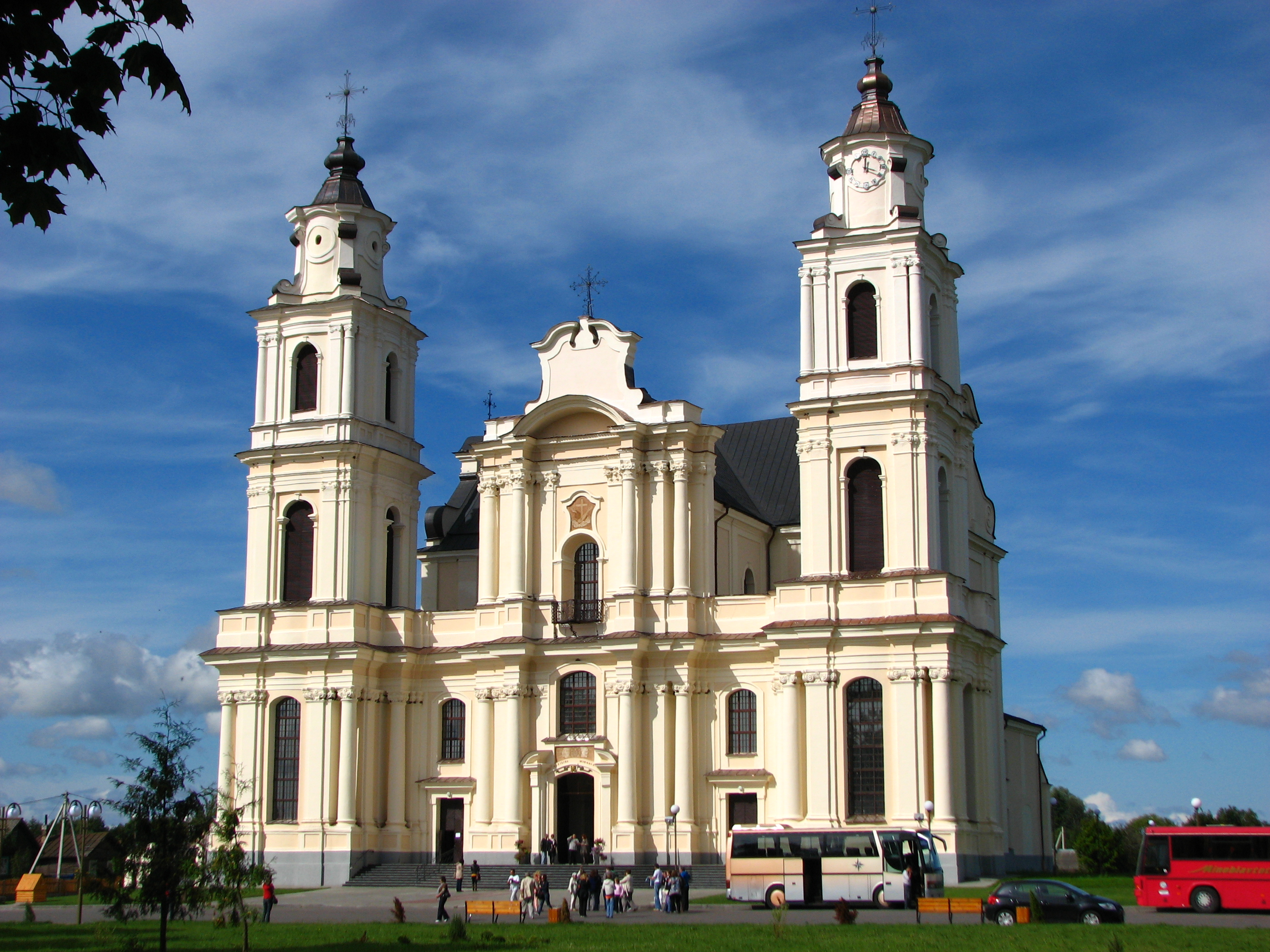
- Church of the Assumption of the Blessed Virgin Mary

- Location within Belarus
- Coordinates: 54°47′0″N 27°27′0″E
- Country: Belarus
- Region: Minsk Region
- District: Myadzyel District
- Elevation: 172 m (564 ft)
- Time zone: UTC+3 (MSK)
- Postal code: 222510
- Area code: +375 1797

Budslaw or Budslau (Note: Belarusian: Будслаў, romanized: Budslaŭ; Russian: Будслав, romanized: Budslav; Polish: Budsław.) is an agrotown in Myadzyel District, Minsk Region, Belarus. It is located 150 kilometres (93 mi) north of the capital Minsk.

The main landmark is the Catholic Minor Basilica of the Assumption of the Blessed Virgin Mary consecrated in 1643. The church is known for the icon of Our Lady of Budslau. The annual celebration in honor of the icon (Budslaw Fest), which takes place on July 2, was added to the UNESCO Intangible Cultural Heritage List in 2018.

== History ==
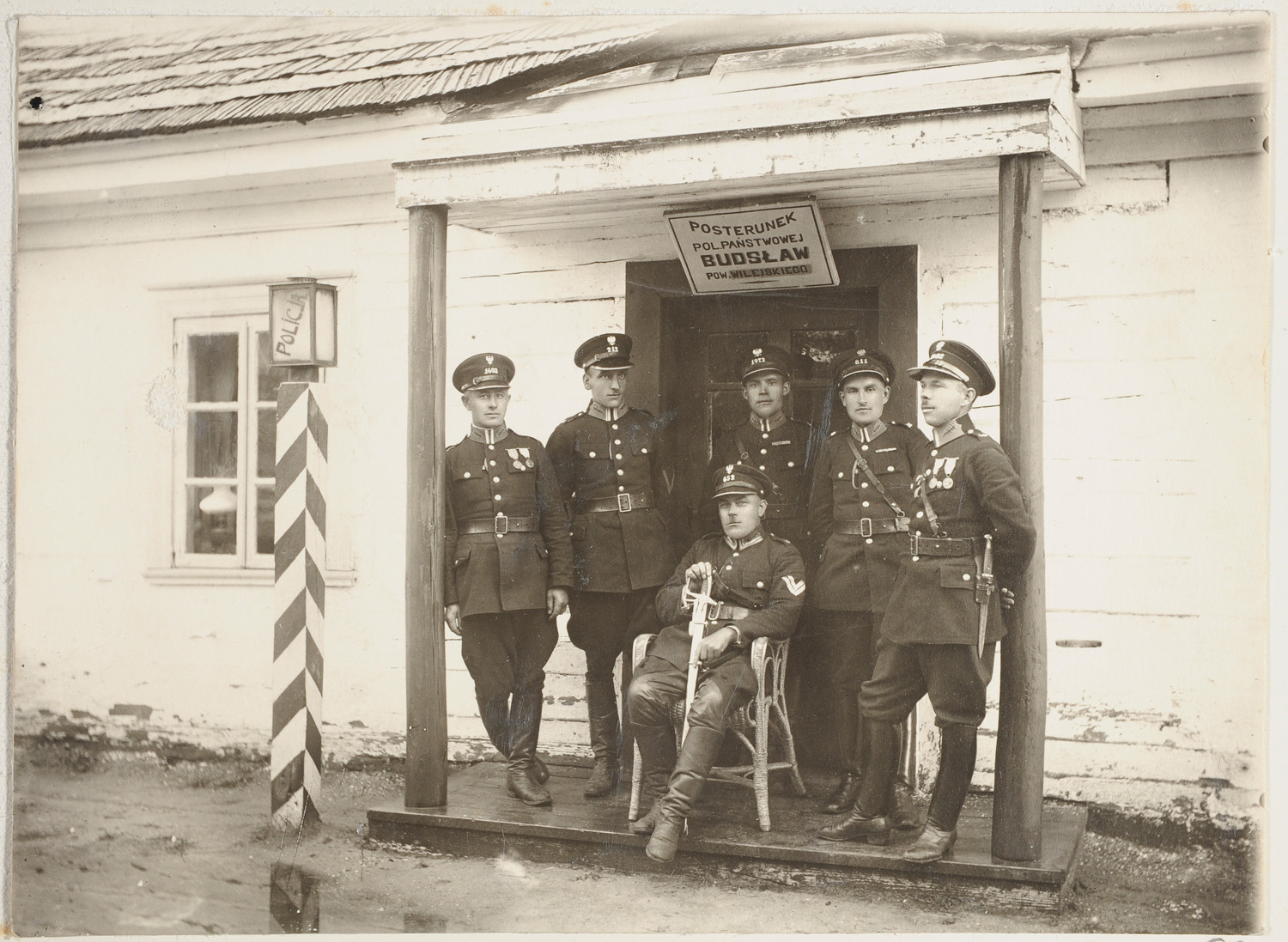
Polish police station in the 1920s

Budsław was founded in 1504 and granted to the Bernardines from Vilnius by King Alexander Jagiellon. The Bernardines first erected a chapel, then a wooden church in 1589, and then a brick church in 1643–1645. Town rights were confirmed by King Augustus II the Strong. It was administratively located in the Oszmiana County in the Vilnius Voivodeship of the Polish–Lithuanian Commonwealth.

Following the Second Partition of Poland (1793), it was annexed by the Russian Empire, within which it belonged to the Vilna Governorate. In the interbellum, it was part of reborn Poland, within which it was located in the Wilno Voivodeship. According to the 1921 Polish census, the population was 88.2% Polish, 7.2% Belarusian, and 4.6% Jewish.

Historical population
Year	Pop.	±%
1859	485	—
1921	626	+29.1%

Following the invasion of Poland at the start of World War II in September 1939, the village was first occupied by the Soviet Union until 1941, then by Germany until 1944. The Germans subjected all Jews over the age of 12 to forced labour, and carried out three massacres of Jews, and some Poles and Belarusians. In 1944 it was re-occupied by the Soviet Union, which annexed it from Poland in 1945.

== Notable residents ==
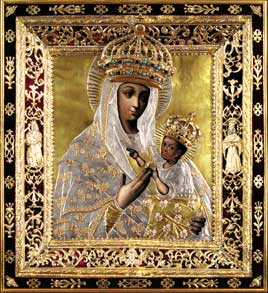
Our Lady of Budslau

- Vincent Žuk-Hryškievič (1903–1989), Belarusian emigre politician, President of the Rada of the Belarusian Democratic Republic (1970-1982)
