= Tadeusz Kondrusiewicz =

Belarusian Roman Catholic priest and pro-democracy activist

His Excellency Tadeusz Kondrusiewicz
- Archbishop emeritus of Minsk–Mohilev
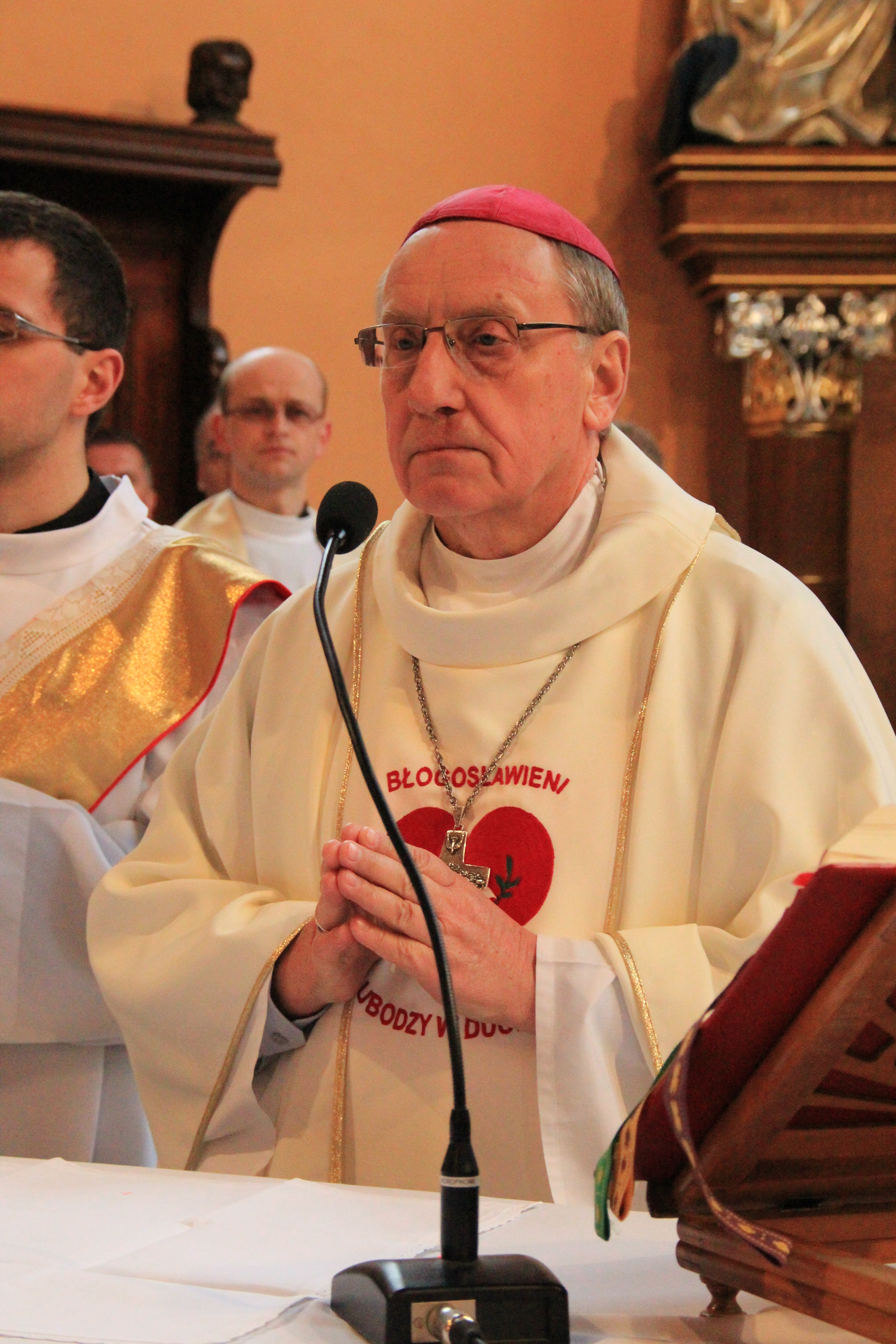
- Tadeusz Kondrusiewicz in 2014
- Church: Catholic Church
- Archdiocese: Minsk–Mohilev
- Appointed: 21 September 2007
- Term ended: 3 January 2021
- Predecessor: Kazimierz Świątek
- Successor: Iosif Staneuski
- Previous posts: Titular Bishop of Hippo Diarrhytus (1989–2002); Apostolic Administrator of Minsk (1989–1991); Apostolic Administrator of Northern European Russia (1991–2002); Archbishop of Moscow (2002–2007); Apostolic Administrator of Pinsk (2011–2012)

Orders
- Ordination: 31 May 1981 by Liudas Povilonis
- Consecration: 20 October 1989 by Pope John Paul II

Personal details
- Born: 3 January 1946 (age 80) Odelsk, Byelorussian SSR, Soviet Union
- Motto: Quis ut Deus ('Who [is] like God?')
- Coat of arms

Tadeusz Kondrusiewicz (Belarusian: Tadevuš Kandrusievič/Тадэвуш Кандрусевіч; born 3 January 1946) is a Belarusian prelate of the Catholic Church who served as Archbishop of Minsk–Mohilev from 2007 to 2021. He has been a bishop since 1989, and from 1991 to 2007 held posts in Russia.

== Early life and education ==
Tadeusz Kondrusiewicz was born in Odelsk, Grodno District, Belarus, on 3 January 1946 to an ethnic Polish family, the elder of the two children of Ignacy Kondrusiewicz (1906–1985) and his wife Anna (née Szusta; 1911–1999). His sister was Maria Kondrusiewicz Buro (1949–1997). In 1962, after completing his secondary schooling, he studied at the Department of Physics and Mathematics at the Grodno Pedagogical Institute, a teachers' training college. He had to leave a year later because of his practice of Catholicism.

In 1964, he entered the Department of Energetics and Machinery Construction at the Leningrad Polytechnical Institute (now the Saint Petersburg Polytechnical University). He graduated in 1970, becoming a mechanical engineer. He worked in Vilnius, Lithuania, which was then part of the Soviet Union.

== Early career ==
In 1976, aged 30, he entered Kaunas Priest Seminary and he was ordained a priest on 31 May 1981. He served as assistant curate in a number of parishes in Lithuania. On 13 February 1988, he was appointed parish priest of the parishes of Our Lady of Angels and St. Francis Xavier in Grodno, Belarus.

On 10 May 1989, Pope John Paul II appointed him Apostolic Administrator of Minsk, Belarus and Titular Bishop of Hippo Diarrhytus. On 20 October, he was consecrated a bishop by John Paul at St. Peter's Basilica, with Cardinals Edward Idris Cassidy and Francesco Colasuonno as co-consecrators.

During his service as a bishop he founded the Senior Grodno Seminary and managed to reopen about 100 churches in Belarus. He initiated the translation and publication of Catholic religious literature in the Belarusian language.

On 13 April 1991, an Apostolic Administration was erected for Russia Europea (Note: European part of Russia) based in Moscow, and Tadeusz Kondrusiewicz was appointed to head it. In 1999, this Apostolic Administration was divided in two and he remained head of the northern one, Russia Europea Settentrionale. Finally, on 11 February 2002, the pope elevated his Apostolic Administrations and the others in Russia to dioceses united in an ecclesiastical province. The Apostolic Administration in Moscow became the Metropolitan Archdiocese of Moscow, and Kondrusiewicz was named Archbishop.

Between 1999 and 2005, Kondrusiewicz spent two three-year terms as chairman of the Conference of Catholic Bishops of Russia. From 1994 to 1999, he was a member of the Congregation for the Oriental Churches, and since 1996 of the Pontifical Council for Health Pastoral Care.

== Archbishop of Minsk ==
On 21 September 2007, Kondrusiewicz was appointed Metropolitan Archbishop of Minsk-Mahilyow by Pope Benedict XVI.

On 30 June 2011, Kazimierz Świątek retired from his position as Apostolic Administrator of Pinsk, and Kondrusiewicz replaced him.

During mass on 1 November 2017, Kondrusiewicz called the 1917 October Revolution in Russia an "existential disaster" that brought immense suffering to Belarus. He noted that, due to neo-Sovietism, Belarus still celebrates the revolution date as a public holiday, while the Catholic population do not have official days off on All Saints Day and Memorial Day to perform their rites.

On 31 August 2020, Kondrusiewicz was prevented from entering Belarus after visiting Poland, despite being a Belarusian citizen. Kondrusiewicz had told an interviewer that "There is reason to believe that the [9 August 2020] election was dishonest. On 19 August he prayed at a prison that held people arrested for protesting that election and on 21 August he met with the Interior Minister to file a protest against the government's response to the protests. He was finally allowed to return on 24 December.

Upon turning 75 on 3 January 2021, Kondrusiewicz tendered his resignation and Pope Francis accepted it immediately.

== Awards ==
He was awarded the Medal "In Commemoration of the 300th Anniversary of Saint Petersburg".

In March 2021, the Center for Belarusian Solidarity awarded Kondrusiewicz the Global Belarusian Solidarity Award in the category "With Faith in My Heart".
