= List of Catholic churches in Belarus =

This is a list of Catholic churches in Belarus.

== Cathedrals ==
See: List of cathedrals in Belarus

- Cathedral of Saint Virgin Mary, Minsk
- Co-Cathedral of the Assumption of the Virgin and St. Stanislaus, Mogilev
- St. Francis Xavier Cathedral, Grodno
- Cathedral of the Merciful Jesus, Vitebsk

== Basilicas ==
- Cathedral Basilica of the Assumption of the Blessed Virgin Mary, Pinsk

== Other churches ==
- Church of the Assumption of the Blessed Virgin Mary, Budslau
- St. Mary's Church, Grodno
- Church of Saint John the Baptist, Kamai
- Church of Holy Trinity, Minsk
- Church of Saints Simon and Helena, Minsk
- St. Nicholas' Church, Mir
- Transfiguration Church, Novogrudok
- Corpus Christi Church, Nyasvizh
- Church of the Assumption of the Blessed Virgin Mary, Pruzhany
- Old Cathedral of St. Barbara and St. Paul, Vitebsk
- Church of St. Thomas Aquinas and the Dominican monastery in Minsk

== See also ==
- Catholic Church in Belarus
- Belarusian Greek Catholic Church
- Byaroza Monastery
- Kalvaryja
