= List of cathedrals in Belarus =

This is the list of cathedrals in Belarus sorted by denomination.

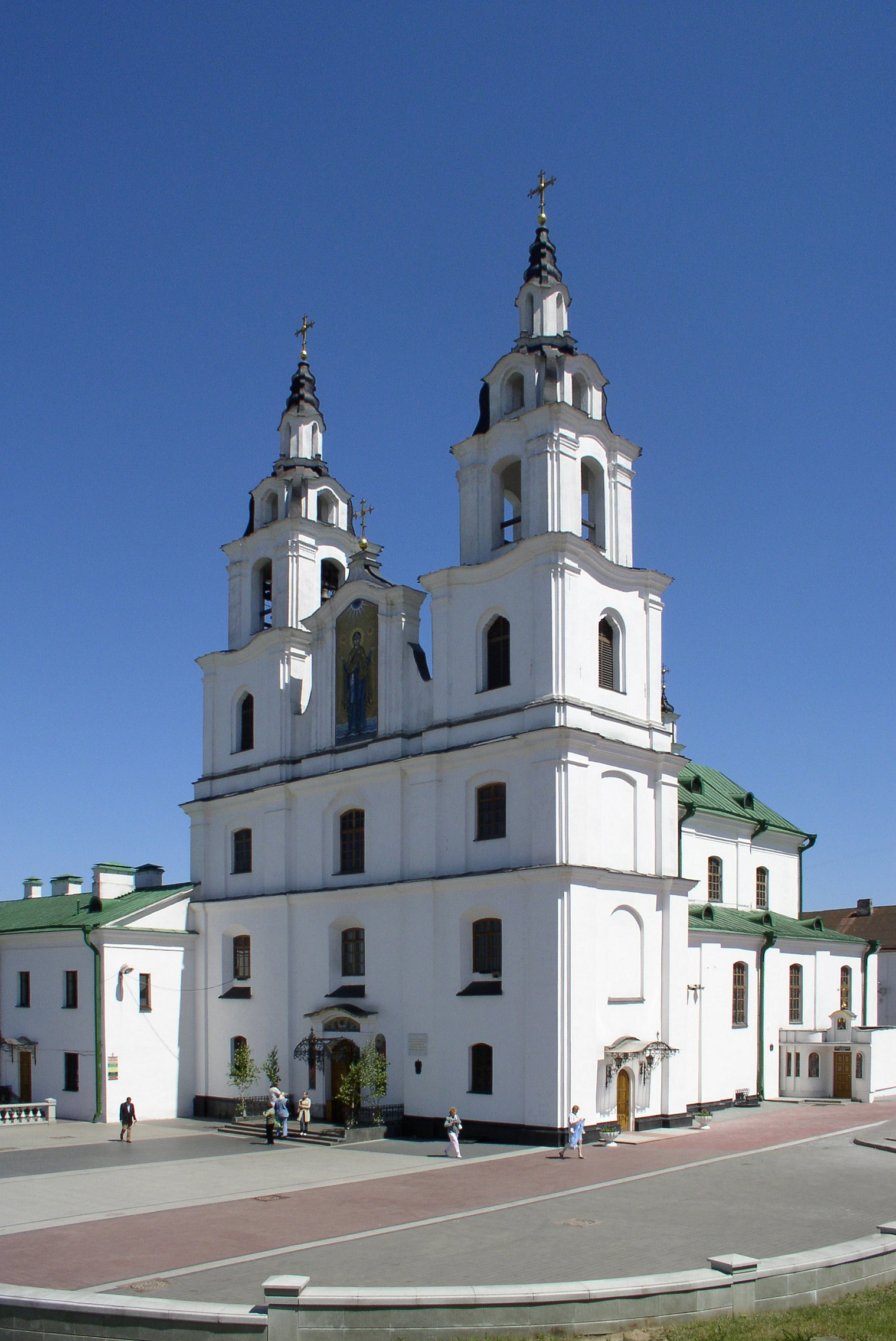
Cathedral of the Holy Spirit in Minsk

== Eastern Orthodox ==
Cathedrals of the Belarusian Orthodox Church:

- Cathedral of the Holy Spirit in Minsk
- Saint Sophia Cathedral in Polotsk
- Holy Virgin Assumpition Cathedral in Vitebsk
- Cathedral of the Epiphany in Polotsk
- St. Peter and Paul Cathedral in Gomel
- Holy Protection Cathedral in Hrodna
- St. Michael's Cathedral in Lida
- Cathedral of Sts. Boris and Gleb in Navahrudak
- Savior's Transfiguration Cathedral in Slonim
- Holy Nativity of the Mother of God Cathedral in Glubokoye
- St. Michael's Cathedral in Slutsk

== Catholic ==
Cathedrals of the Catholic Church in Belarus:

- Cathedral Basilica of St. Francis Xavier in Grodno
- Cathedral of the Blessed Virgin Mary in Minsk
- Cathedral Basilica of the Assumption of the Blessed Virgin Mary in Pinsk
- Cathedral of the Merciful Jesus in Vitebsk
- Co-Cathedral of the Assumption of the Blessed Virgin and St. Stanislaus in Mohilev

== See also ==
- Lists of cathedrals by country
