= Church of St. Barbara, Vitebsk =

Cathedral of St. Barbara and St. Paul
- Касцёл святой Барбары ў Віцебску
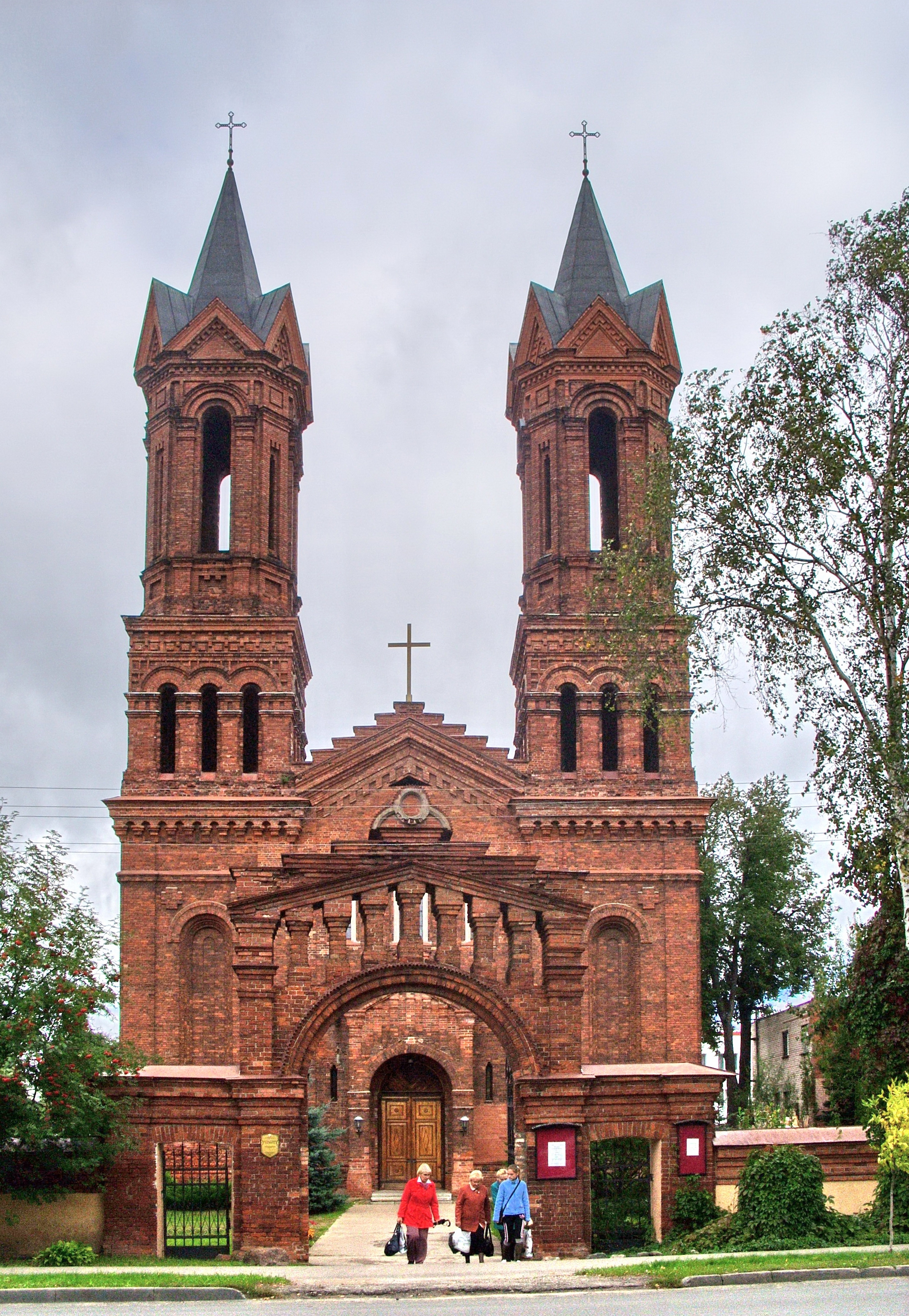
- Cathedral of St. Barbara and St. Paul
- 55.2013°N 30.1804°E
- Location: Vitebsk
- Country: Belarus
- Denomination: Roman Catholic Church

Architecture
- Architectural type: Romanesque Revival

Administration
- Diocese: Roman Catholic Diocese of Vitebsk

The Church of St. Barbara (formerly Cathedral of St. Barbara and St. Paul) (Belarusian: Касцёл Святой Барбары ў Віцебску, romanized: Kaściol Śviatoj Barbary ŭ Viciebsku) is a Catholic church and the parish in Vitebsk, Belarus.

== History ==
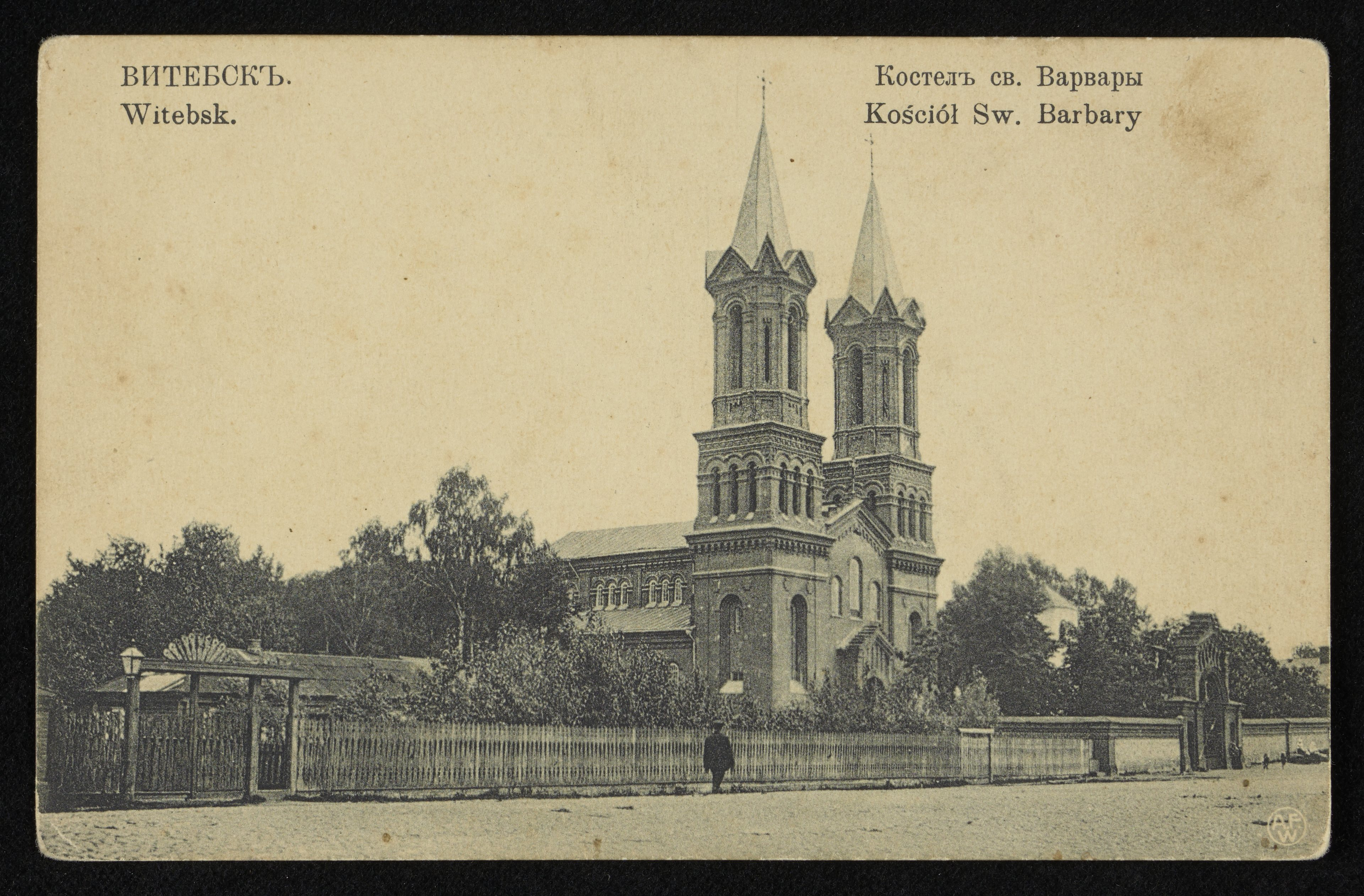
The church in 1910

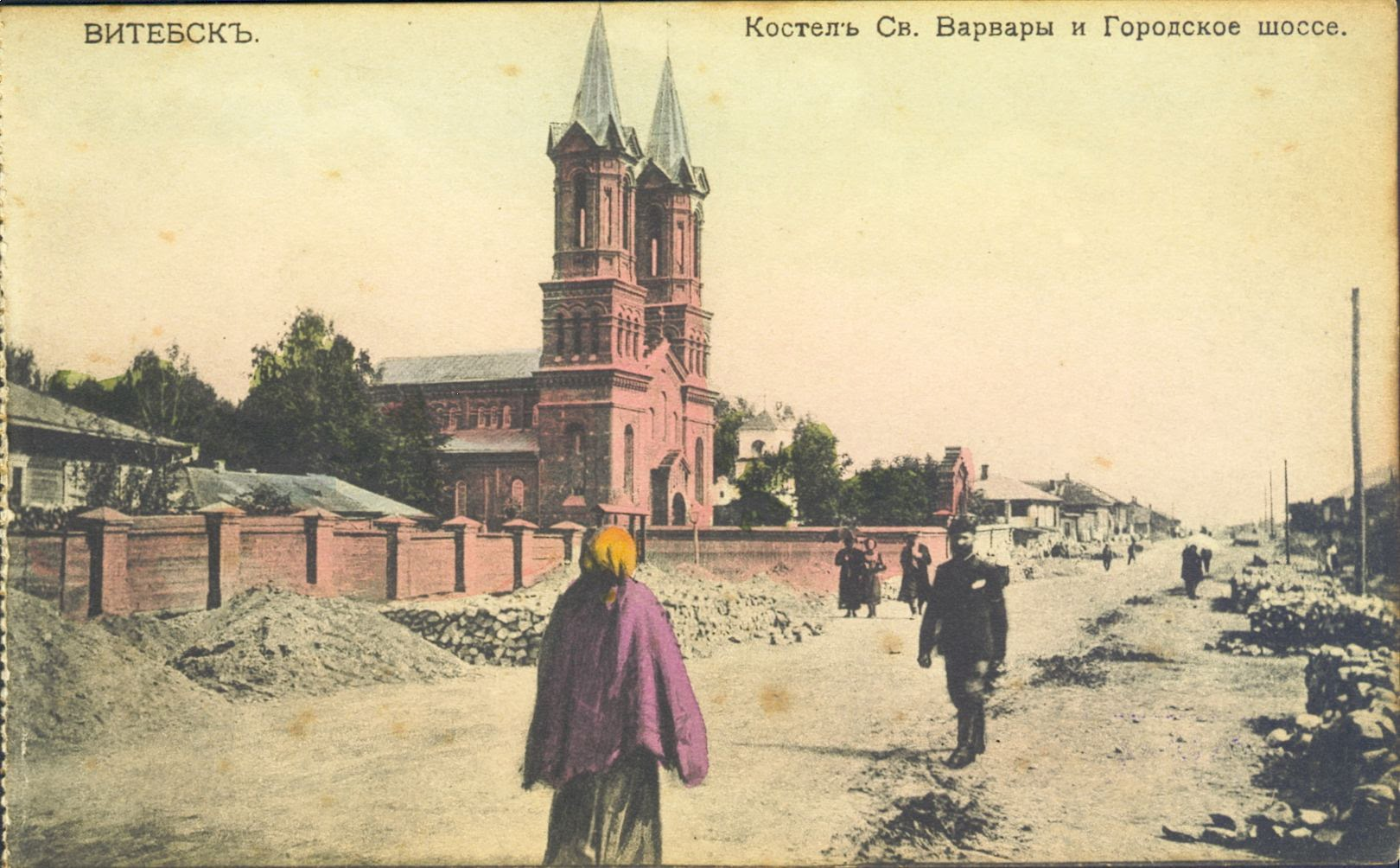
The church in 1908

The church was built next to a cemetery in 1785. In the years 1884–1885 it was rebuilt in Neo-Romanesque style by architect Victor Junosza-Piotrowski (including the construction of two towers). It was closed in the 1930s in the era of the Soviet Union, and during World War II was partially destroyed. In the years after the war in the temple he had various uses.

In 1935 the church was closed by the Soviet authorities during its anti-religious program, and during World War II was partially destroyed. In the years after the war the temple was abandoned and gradually decayed.

In 1990 the cathedral was returned to the Catholic church, and between 1991 and 1998 was reconstructed. In 1993, it was consecrated by the cardinal Kazimierz Świątek. Between 1999 and 2011, the church served as the cathedral of the new diocese of Vitebsk. Today, the main cathedral is the Cathedral of Merciful Jesus in Vitebsk, consecrated in 2009. Later the follow church continued under repairs, which were funded with support from the Ministry of Culture and National Heritage of the Republic of Poland.

== Interior ==
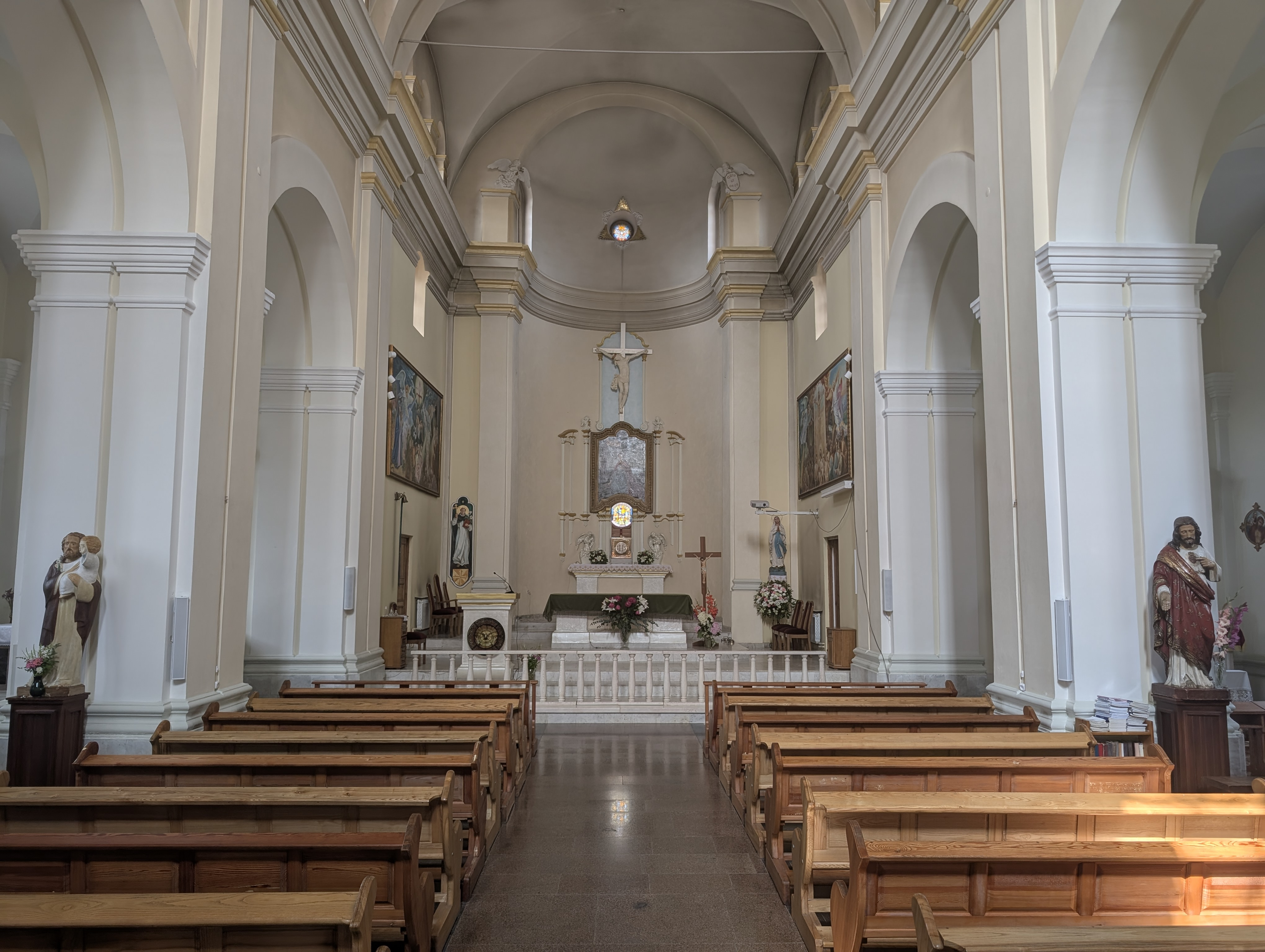
Interior of the church

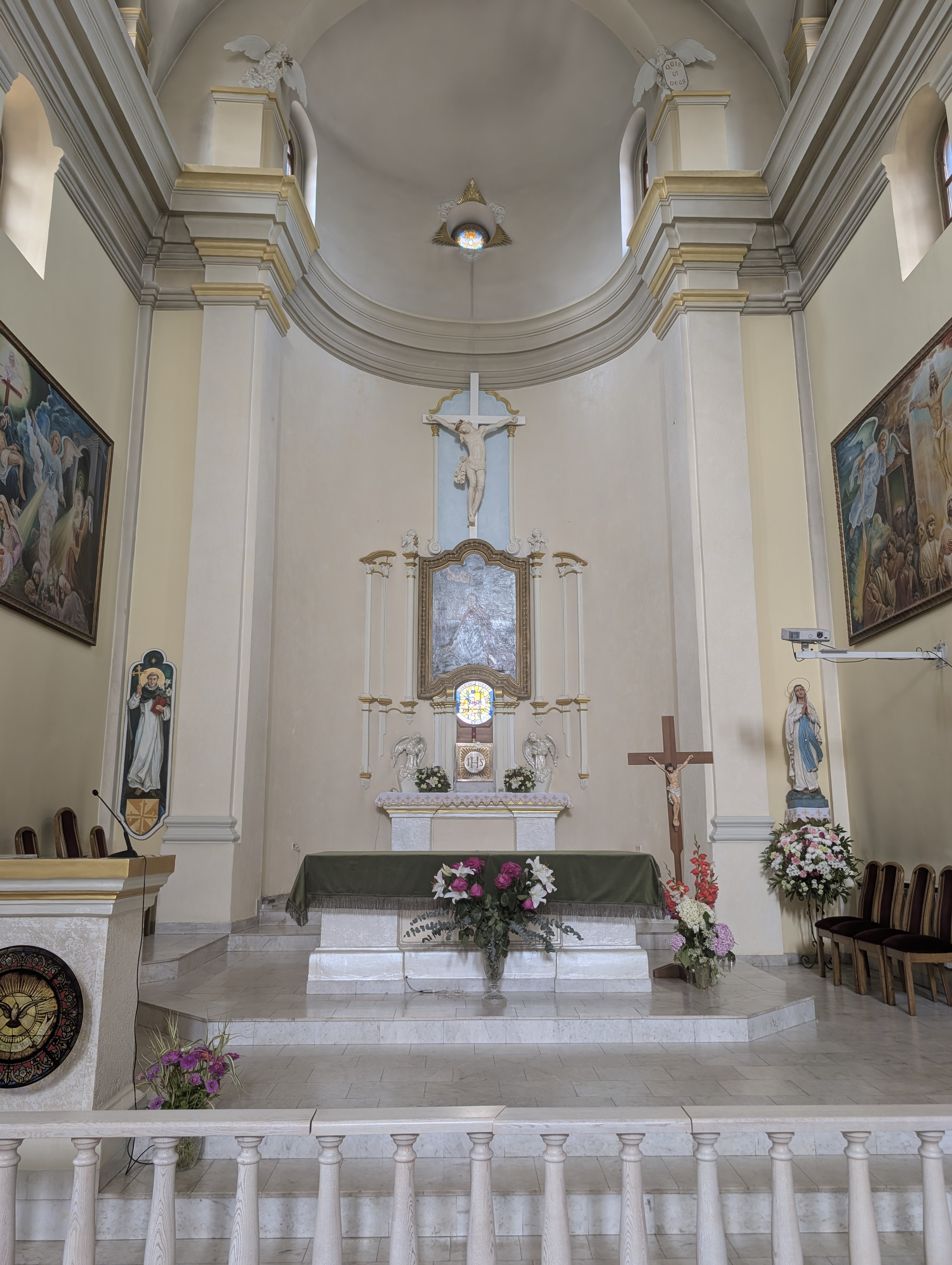
Church altar

== See also ==
- Media related to Church of Saint Barbara in Viciebsk at Wikimedia Commons
- Roman Catholicism in Belarus
- St. Barbara
- 3D Scene (Nov 26, 2021 - filmed, Dec 8, 2024 - splatted)
