= Episcopal Conference of Belarus =

Assembly of Catholic bishops

Conference of Catholic Bishops of Belarus is the collective body for national church matters and the administration of the Catholic Church in Belarus. It was established and approved on February 11, 1999. The first chairman was Cardinal Kazimierz Świątek.

== Chairmen of the Conference ==
- Cardinal Kazimierz Świątek (1999 – 2006)
- Bishop Aleksander Kaszkiewicz (2006 – 2015)
- Archbishop Tadeusz Kondrusiewicz (2015 – 2021)
- Bishop Aleh Butkewitsch (2021 - 2024)
- Archbishop Josif Staneuski (since 2024)

== Composition ==
As of 2025, the conference consisted of:

- Archbishop of Minsk-Mohilev Josif Staneuski, Chairman
- Bishop of Vitebsk Aleh Butkewitsch, deputy chairman
- Assistant Bishop of Minsk-Mohilev, Juri Kasabutski, Secretary-General
- Bishop of Pinsk Anthony Demyanko
- Bishop of Grodno Uladzimir Guliai
- Assistant Bishop of Pinsk, Andrei Znosko
- Assistant Bishop of Minsk-Mohilev, Aleksandr Jaschewski

== Structure ==
The conference has committees, councils and sections responsible for various subjects, including:

- Pastoral center
- Ecclesiastical court
- Construction Bureau
- Commission for the Family
- Catechetical section
- Commission for Translation of liturgical texts and official documents for Catholic Church God Worship and Discipline of the Sacraments
- Commission for Church music and worship God the Commission Discipline of the Sacraments
- Media
- Catholic Association for Communication SIGNIS-BELARUS.
- Caritas Belarus

== See also ==
- Episcopal Conference
- Catholic Church in Belarus

== Notes ==
Further reading

- gcatholic.org
