= Władysław Blin =

Belarusian Roman Catholic bishop

- Bishop Emeritus of Vitebsk
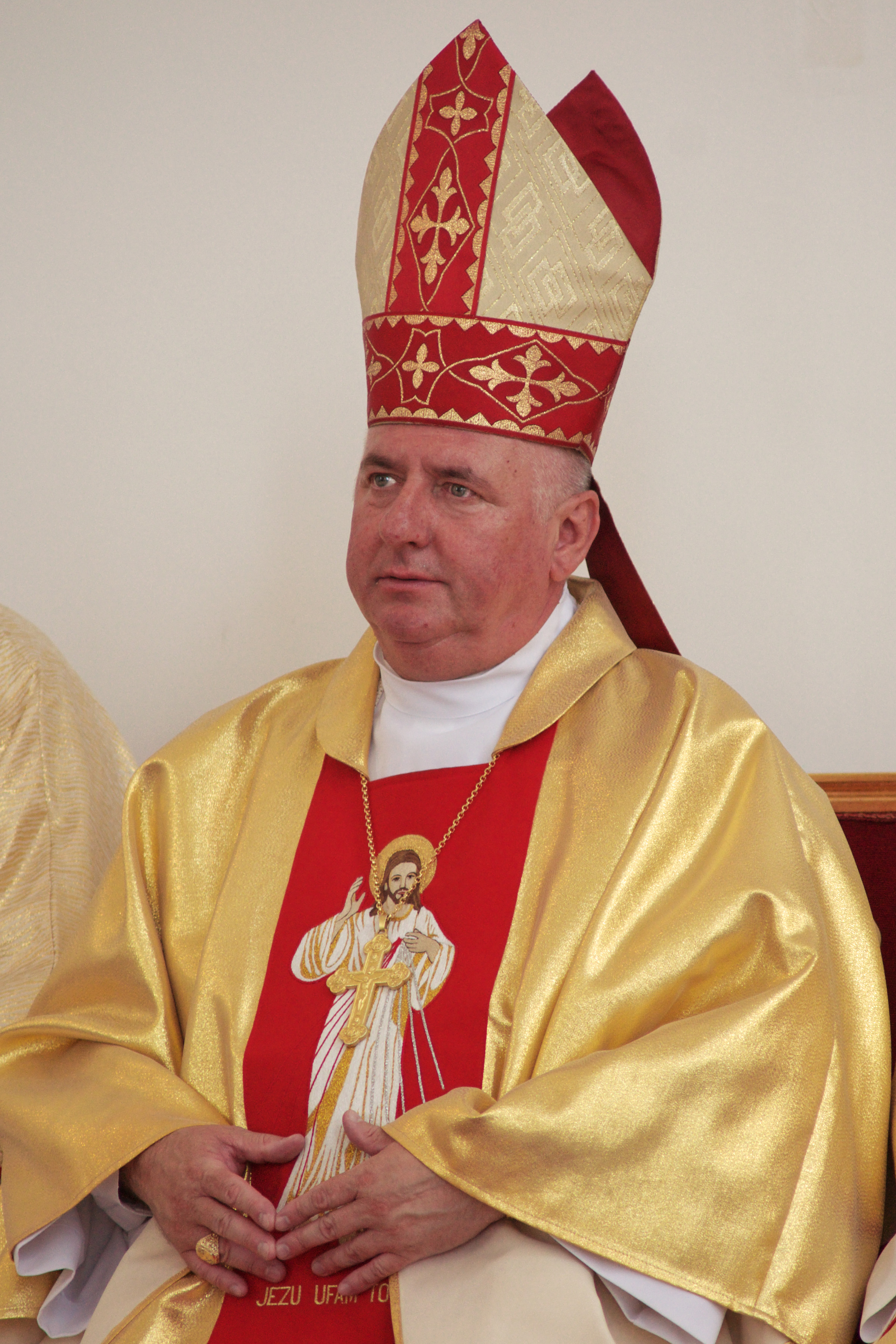
- Władysław Blin in 2010
- Church: Catholic Church
- Diocese: Diocese of Vitebsk
- In office: 13 October 1999 – 25 February 2013
- Predecessor: Diocese erected
- Successor: Aleh Butkevich

Orders
- Ordination: 25 May 1980 by Jan Zaręba
- Consecration: 20 November 1999 by Kazimierz Świątek

Personal details
- Born: 31 May 1954 (age 72) Świdwin, Warsaw Voivodeship, Polish People's Republic

Władysław Blin (Belarusian: Уладзіслаў Блін, Uladzislaw Blin, born 31 May 1954) was Bishop of the diocese of Vitebsk, the Catholic diocese centered in the city of Vitebsk, Belarus.

== Life in Poland ==
He was born 31 May 1954, in Poland, in Świdwin (Western Pomerania) in a Polish family, which immigrated after World War II to post-war Poland from the town of Zadoroże of the pre-war Wilno Voivodeship of Eastern Poland, annexed after the war by the Soviet Union (now Zadarožža, Hłybokaje District, Vitebsk Region). Later the family moved to the village of Ślesin, where Władysław Blin spent his childhood. Władysław Blin chosen path in life early Catholic priest. He was in Poland spiritual Catholic education, he graduated from the Higher Theological Seminary in Włocławek, in the same 25 May 1980, by Jan Zaręba, bishop of Włocławek, was ordained a priest. Władyslaw Blin continued his education at the Catholic University of Lublin and the Academy of Catholic Theology in Warsaw (now the University of Cardinal Stefan Wyszynski in Warsaw).

== Living in Belarus ==
In 1989, when the Soviet Union lifted restrictions on religious life, he moved to the historic homeland of his family to Belarus, where he was appointed rector of the Catholic parish in Mogilev. He founded the first in the entire region of Mogilev Catholic parish, the Church had secured the return of the church of the Ascension of the Virgin Mary and St. Stanislaus, where he became abbot. In 1998, he received a doctorate in theological science. His doctoral work was devoted to St. Joseph. On 13 October 1999, he was appointed the first bishop of the newly formed diocese of Vitiebsk, and was consecrated on 20 November 1999. The principal consecrator was cardinal Kazimierz Swiatek. As his episcopal motto, Blin chose the phrase Soli Deo. On 14 June 2006, he was elected deputy chairman of the Conference of Catholic Bishops of Belarus. He is Chairman of the Ecumenical Commission and the Commission's general pastoral bishops in Belarus.

The Pope accepted his resignation from the diocese on 25 February 2013.
