= Church of the Assumption of the Blessed Virgin Mary, Pruzhany =

Coordinates: 52°33′43″N 24°27′23″E

Church of the Assumption of the Blessed Virgin Mary
- Kaścioł Uniebaŭziaćcia Najśviaciejšaj Panny Maryi
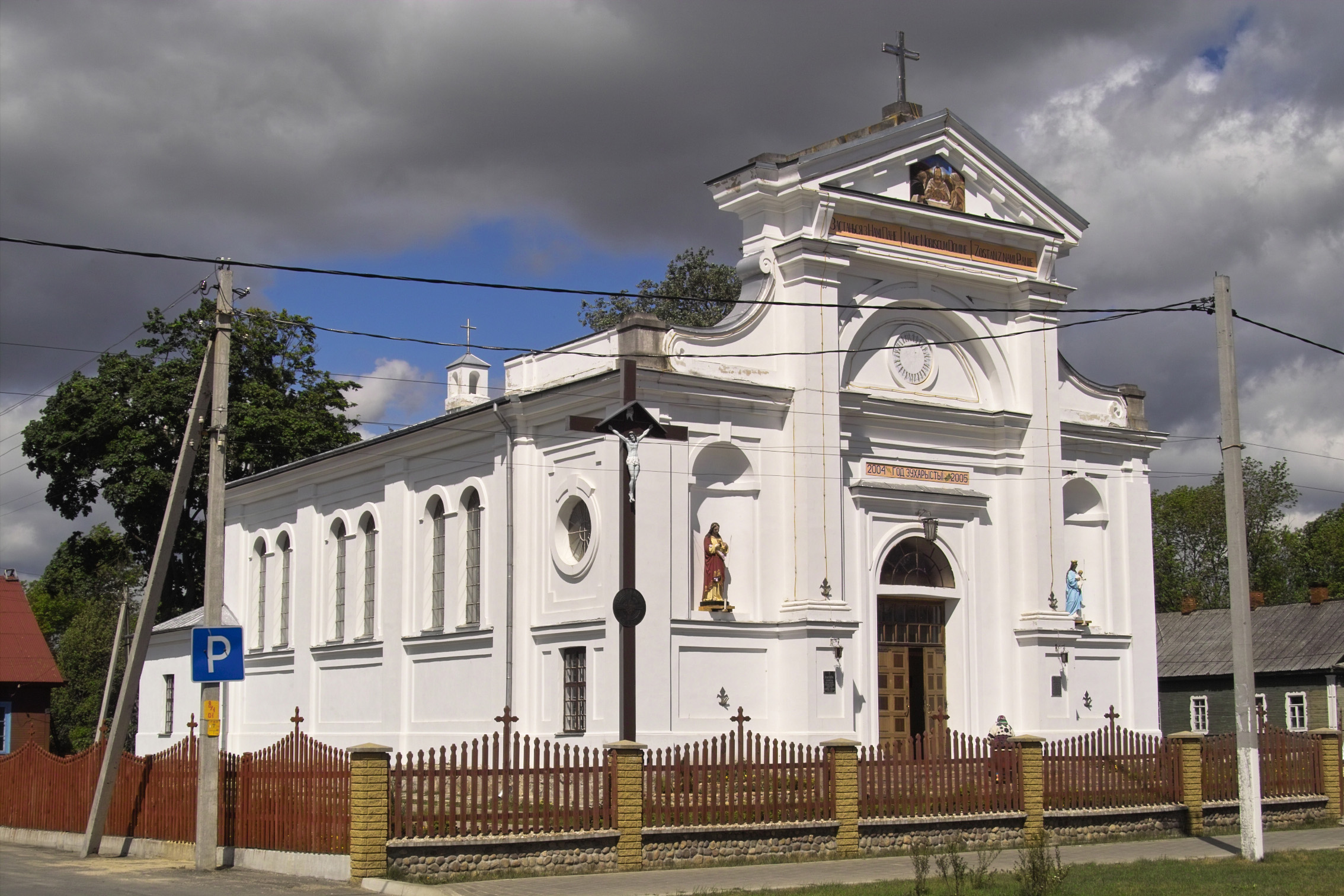
- Church of the Assumption of the Blessed Virgin Mary
- Location: Pruzhany
- Country: Belarus
- Denomination: Roman Catholic

Architecture
- Architect: Enrico Marconi
- Style: neoclassic
- Years built: 1522, 1823

Catholic church of the Assumption of the Blessed Virgin Mary (Belarusian: Kaścioł Uniebaŭziaćcia Najśviaciejšaj Panny Maryi, Касьцёл Унебаўзяцьця Найсьвяцейшай Панны Марыі, Polish: Kościół Wniebowzięcia Najświętszej Maryi Panny) is a Roman Catholic church in Pružany, Belarus. Monument of neoclassical architecture.

== History ==
=== Construction and Reconstruction ===
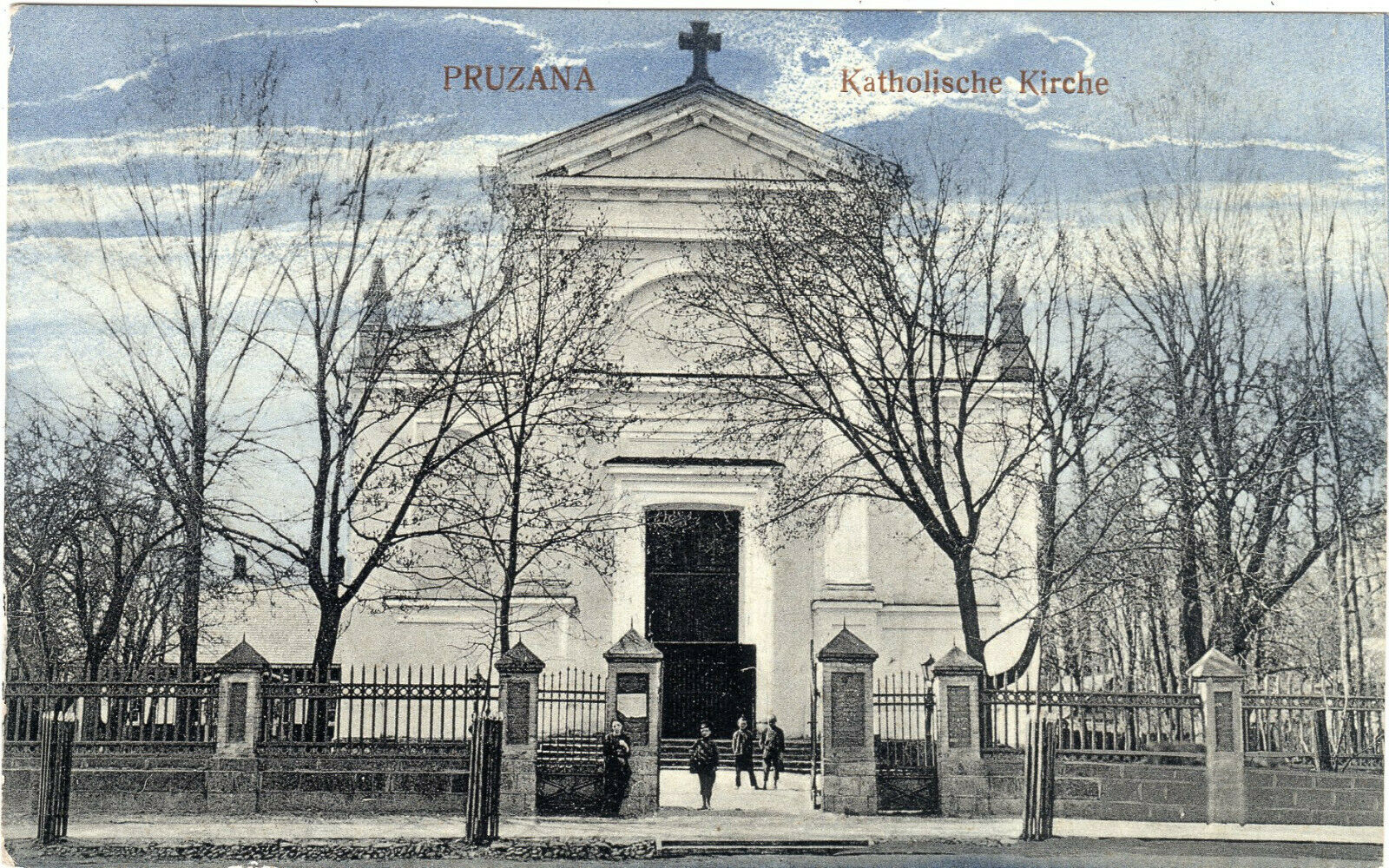
The church in 1916

The first Catholic church in Pruzhany was built in 1522. By the middle of the 19th century, it was burned, at a time when the Russian Empire reigned, Catholics required to build a new stone building, for which the famous architect Henryk Marconi was invited from Warsaw.

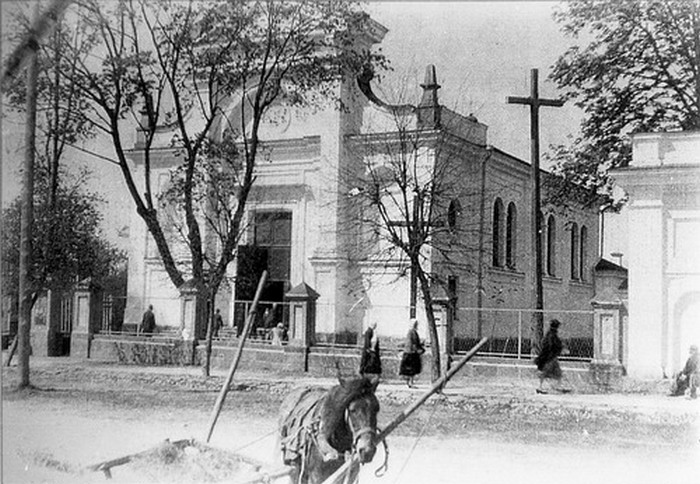
The church in 1935

Local nobleman Walenty Szwykowski financed the construction. However, after the events of the national liberation uprising of 1863 against Russian domination, still unfinished church was selected and rebuilt by the Russian Orthodox Church. The people rebelled and insisted that at least one Catholic church to be built in Pruzhany. Permission was granted, but the tsarist authorities was delivered condition of the church would not rise above the other buildings of the city.

Construction of the church ended in 1883, on September 29, it was handed over to religious authorities. On September 8, 1884, the church was consecrated under the title of the Assumption of the Blessed Virgin Mary. Events arranged a priest Karol Gryniawicki.

=== 20th century ===
Temple was damaged during the First World War. In 1929–1930, when Pružana was part of Poland, with financial support from the gentry Dziekońscy and Moraczewscy temple completely repaired, replaced the roof and windows, conducted electric lighting.

In 1939, the vicar of the church was Kazimierz Świątek (Roman Catholic Cardinal). After the arrival of Soviet troops in Pruzhana in September 1939 he was arrested and held on death row in Brest for two months. Father Świątek escaped from prison, taking advantage of the confusion caused by the Nazi German invasion of the Soviet Union on 22 June 1941, and returned to Pruzhany. In December 1944, the NKVD arrested Swiątek for a second time. The following year he was sentenced to 10 years hard labor in a concentration camp, and spent nine years in Siberia and the north of the Soviet Union, working in the taiga and in the mines.

Two years later in Poland left the priest Antoni Rojko fearing persecution by Soviet authorities. Believers continued to meet in the church in prayer, even without a priest for two more years, until it was closed on March 2, 1948.

April 19, 1951 the city authorities decided to rebuild the church beneath House of Culture. The wooden parts of its organ were used for heating, church furniture and clothing was put on tailoring theatrical costumes. Part of the property was sold. Thus the Church shared the fate of many temples in the former USSR, which, if not destroyed, have become cultural centers, clubs, warehouses, storage of agricultural machinery.

In the early 1990s began to seek the return of the faithful of the church. August 4, 1991 in Pruzhana was sent to the pastoral activity priest Edward Lojek. December 2, when Belarus has become an independent country, the authorities allowed to hold worship services in the church.

February 1, 1993, and returned to the church was consecrated in honor of the Mother of God. February 6 a solemn Mass was celebrated by Archbishop Kazimierz Świątek.

Large-scale restoration lasted until 1998. The complete inventory and documentation for the reconstruction of free made professor of the Institute of preservation of monuments of Kraków Polytechnic Wiktor Zin.

At the site of the Communists destroyed the monument to Christ the Savior put Jubilee cross to the 2000th anniversary of Christianity.

On May 5, 2021, a new icon of St Mary was consecrated in the church.
