= Caritas Belarus =

Belarusian Catholic social welfare organisation

- Catholic Charitable Society Caritas
- Дабрачыннае каталіцкае таварыства Карытас Беларусь
- Type: Nonprofit
- Purpose: social welfare, social justice
- Headquarters: Cathedral of the Holy Name of Saint Virgin Mary
- Location: Minsk, Belarus
- Coordinates: 53.9030°N 27.5546°E
- Services: social services, humanitarian aid
- Affiliations: Caritas Internationalis, Caritas Europa
- Website: caritas.by

Caritas Belarus (Belarusian: Рэлігійная місія «Дабрачыннае каталіцкае таварыства Карытас» Канферэнцыі Каталіцкіх Біскупаў у Беларусі; "Religious Mission 'Caritas Catholic Charitable Society' of the Catholic Bishops' Conference in Belarus") is a not-for-profit social welfare organisation in Belarus. It is a service of the Catholic Church in Belarus.

Caritas Belarus is a member of both Caritas Internationalis and Caritas Europa.

== History and structure ==
In Belarus, Caritas was founded in 1990 during the dissolution of the Soviet Union. Initially, its work focussed on the provision of humanitarian aid in the parishes and for people living in poverty. Caritas organisations developed at the diocesan level.

The national Caritas Belarus, based in the capital Minsk, was represents all diocesan Caritas organisations in ministries and various government agencies, as well as in the international organizations, such as Caritas Internationalis, Caritas Europa and other international partners, including Renovabis. The four diocesan Caritas organisations are:

- Caritas of the Minsk-Mogilev Archdiocese (Belarusian: Карытас Мінска-Магілёўскай архідыяцэзіі), founded in 1991
- Caritas of the Vitebsk Diocese (Belarusian: Карытас Віцебскай дыяцэзіі), founded in 1999
- Caritas of the Grodno Diocese (Belarusian: Карытас Гродзенскай дыяцэзіі), founded in 1990
- Caritas of the Pinsk Diocese (Belarusian: Карытас Пінскай дыяцэзіі), founded in 1993

Caritas Belarus reports to the Episcopal Conference of Belarus.

== Work ==
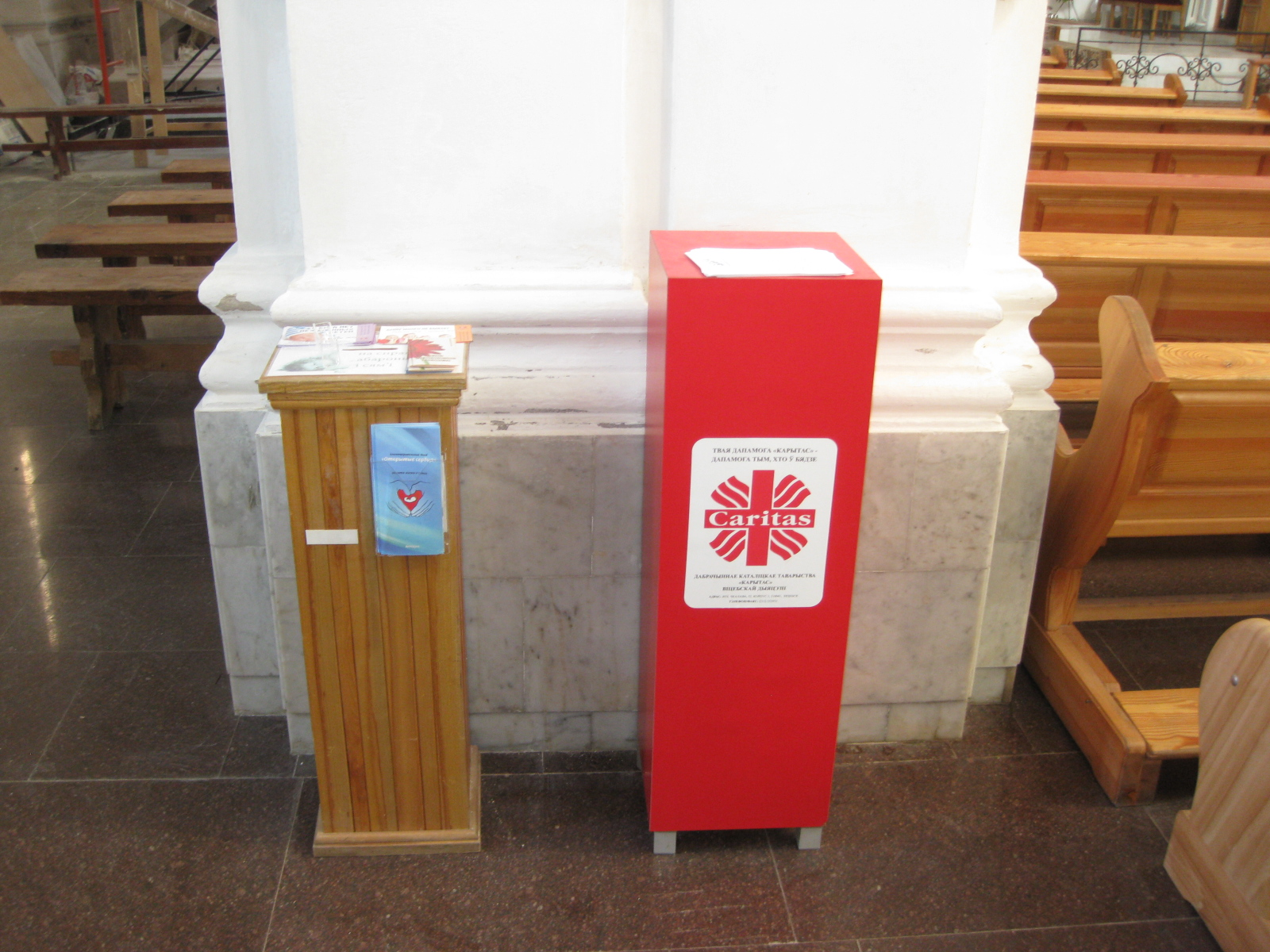
Caritas donation boxes in a church in Vitebsk.

In the 1990s, a significant focus of humanitarian efforts in Belarus was improving the health of children affected by the Chernobyl nuclear disaster. This included initiatives such as organising holidays in Austria for thousands of children to support their physical and psychological recovery.

Caritas Belarus has been at the forefront of providing care and assistance to vulnerable groups in the country. The organisation provides free lunches, shelters for orphans and social orphans, and programmes to facilitate the integration of children and young people with disabilities into society.
