= Church of the Divine Providence (Slobodka) =

Church in Słobódka, Belarus

- Касцёл Божага Провіду
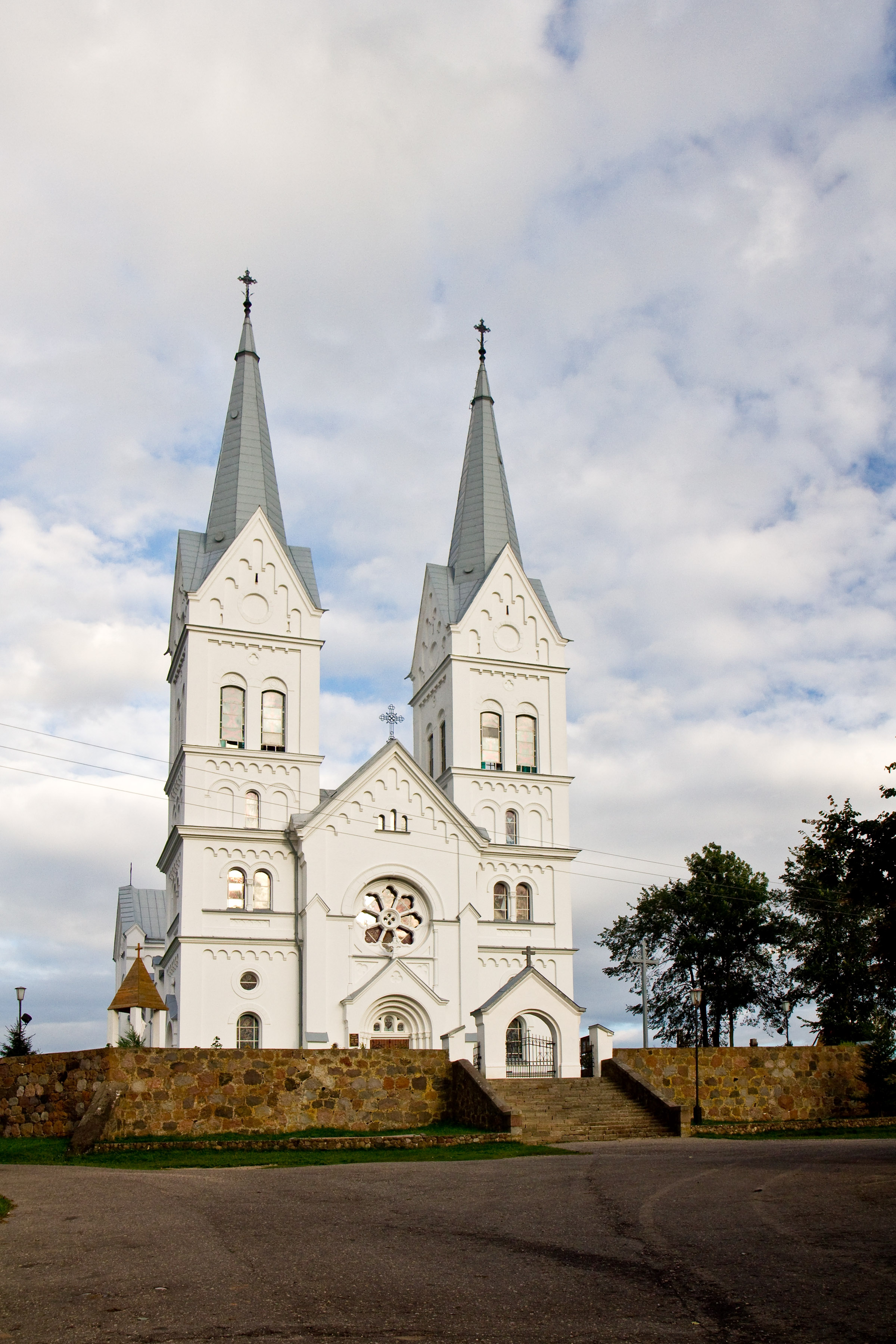
- Church of the Divine Providence
- 55°41′10″N 27°11′01″E
- Location: Słobódka (8th of March str., 10)
- Country: Belarus
- Denomination: Roman Catholic church

Architecture
- Style: Romanesque Revival architecture
- Years built: 1903–1906; 120 years ago

Administration
- Diocese: Roman Catholic Diocese of Vitebsk

Church of the Divine Providence is a Catholic church in Słobódka, Belarus, listed as a national Cultural Heritage object.

The Church of the Divine Providence was built on the site of an older church, which was in turn constructed in 1806. The old church was replaced when it was no longer able to accommodate the parish. The new church was decorated in the Romanesque Revival style. It received two tall five-storey towers topped with a peaked tented roof.

The church was closed from 1949 to 1953 and repurposed as a granary. The pipe organ was damaged during World War II and restored only in 1999.

== Gallery ==
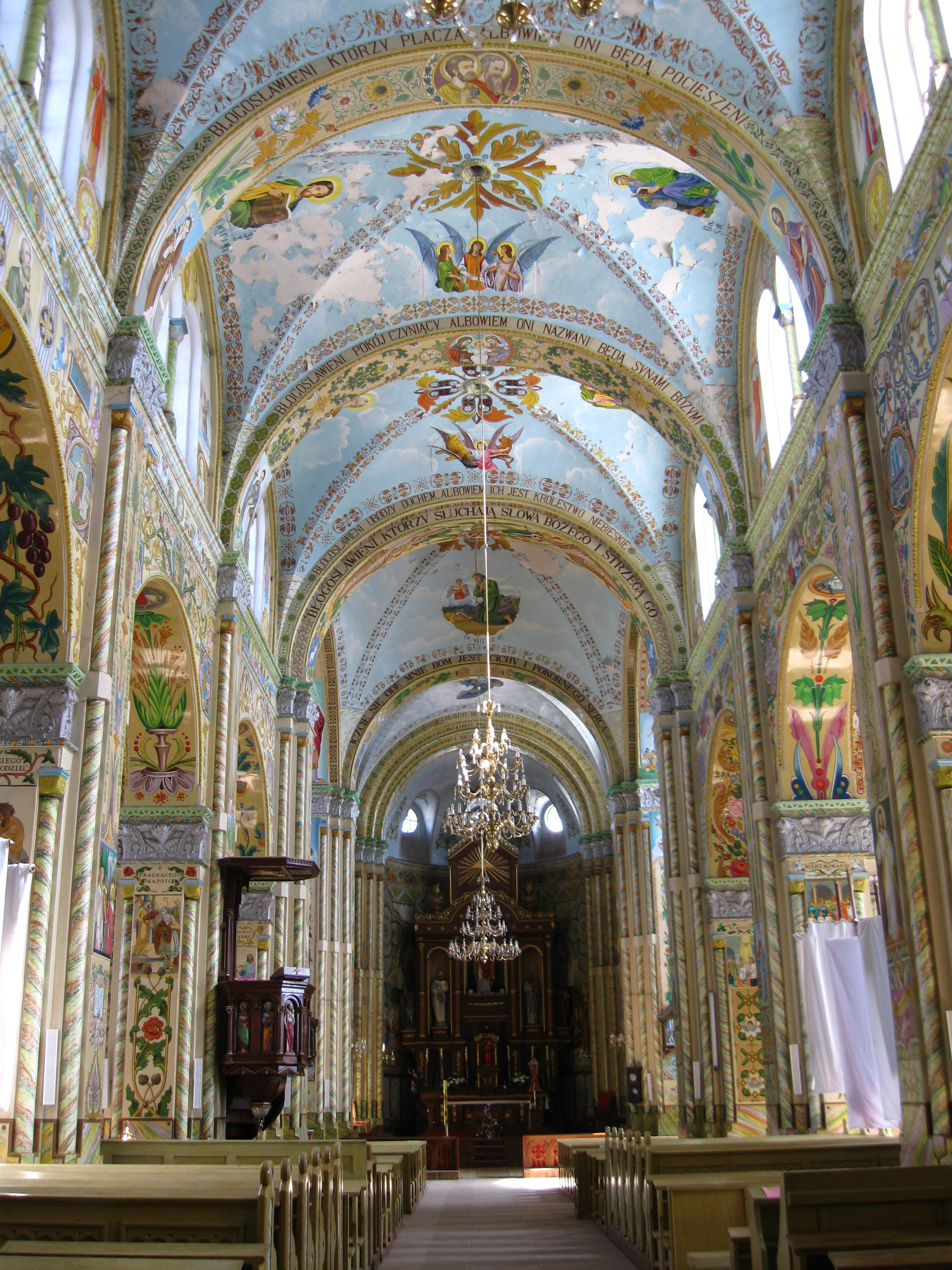
The interior in 2009

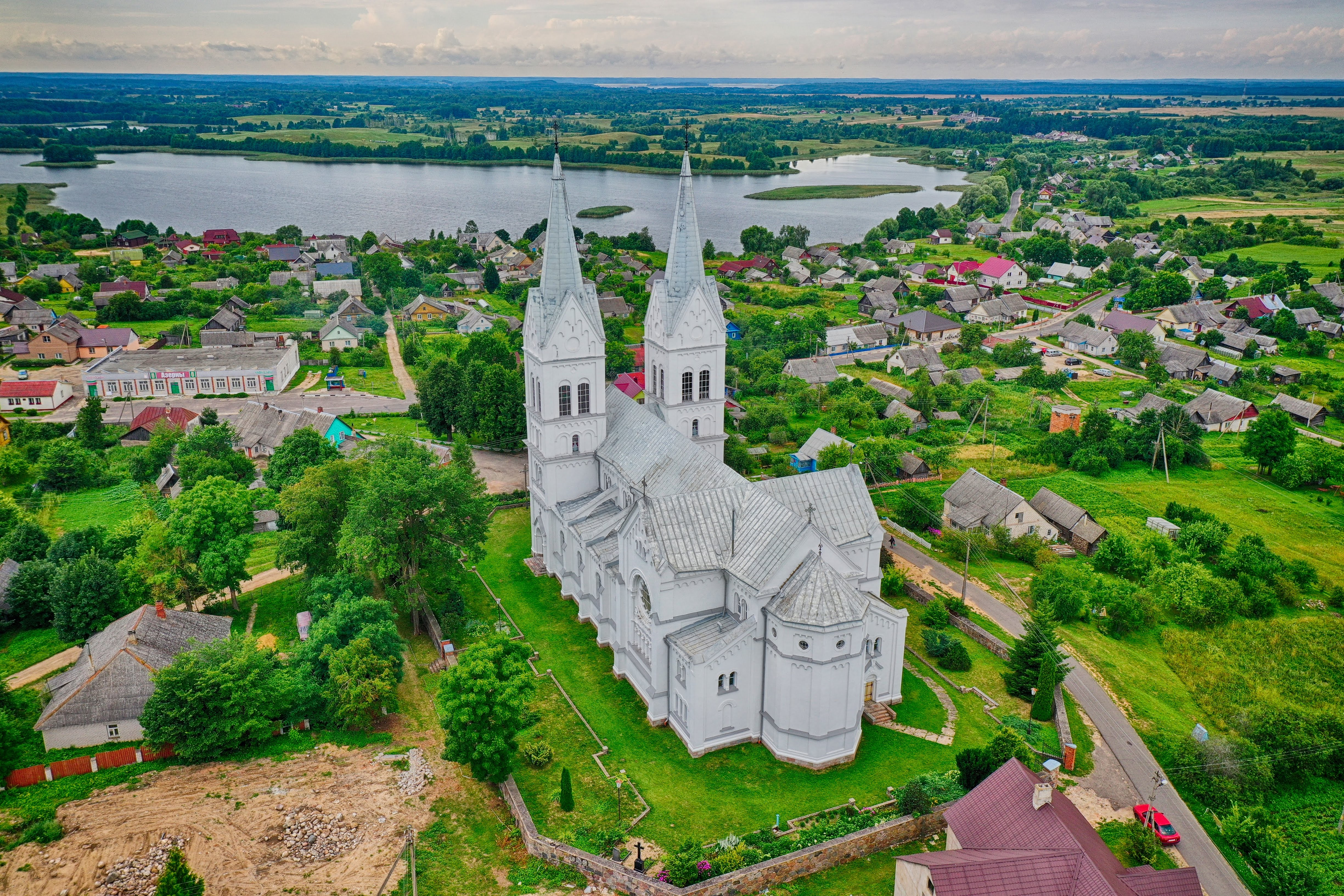
Aerial photo in 2021

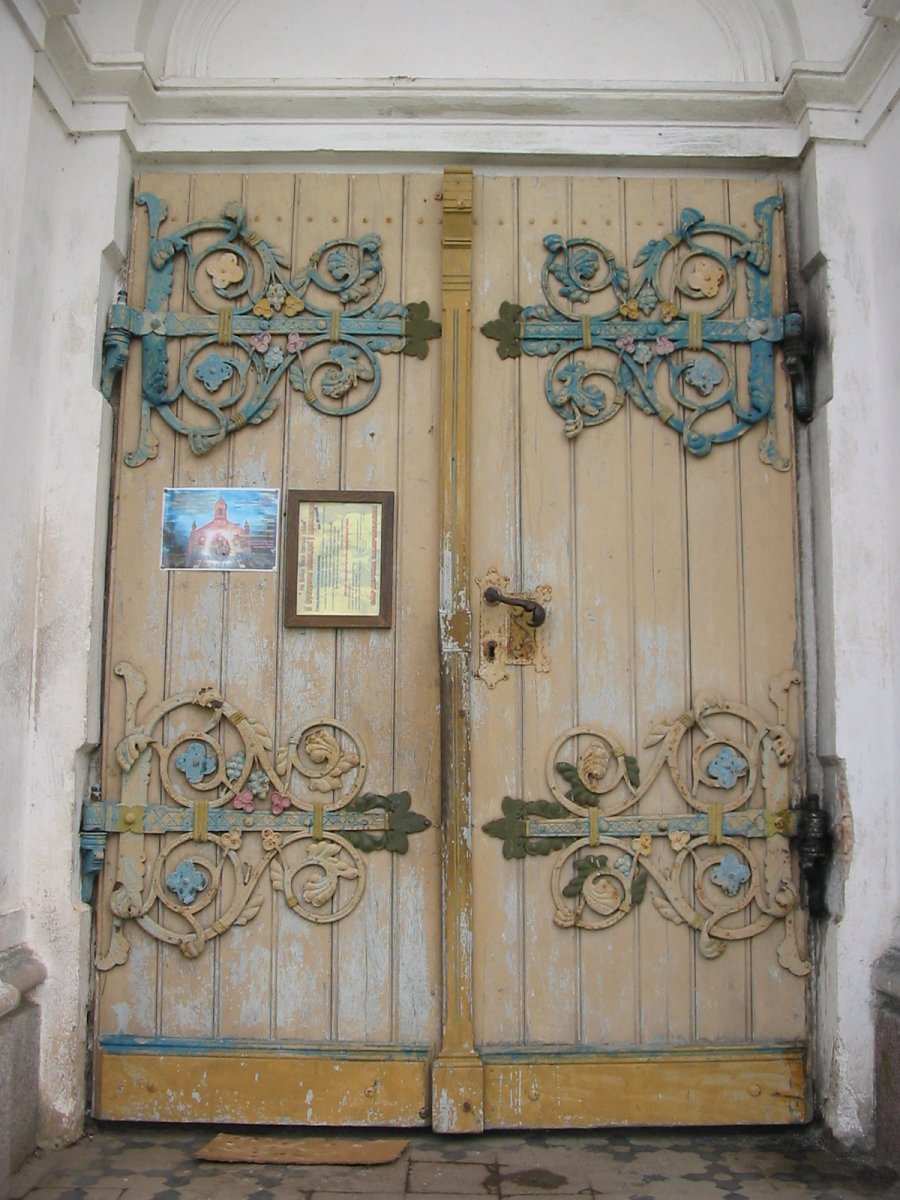
The historical hammer-work doors, crafted by a local master

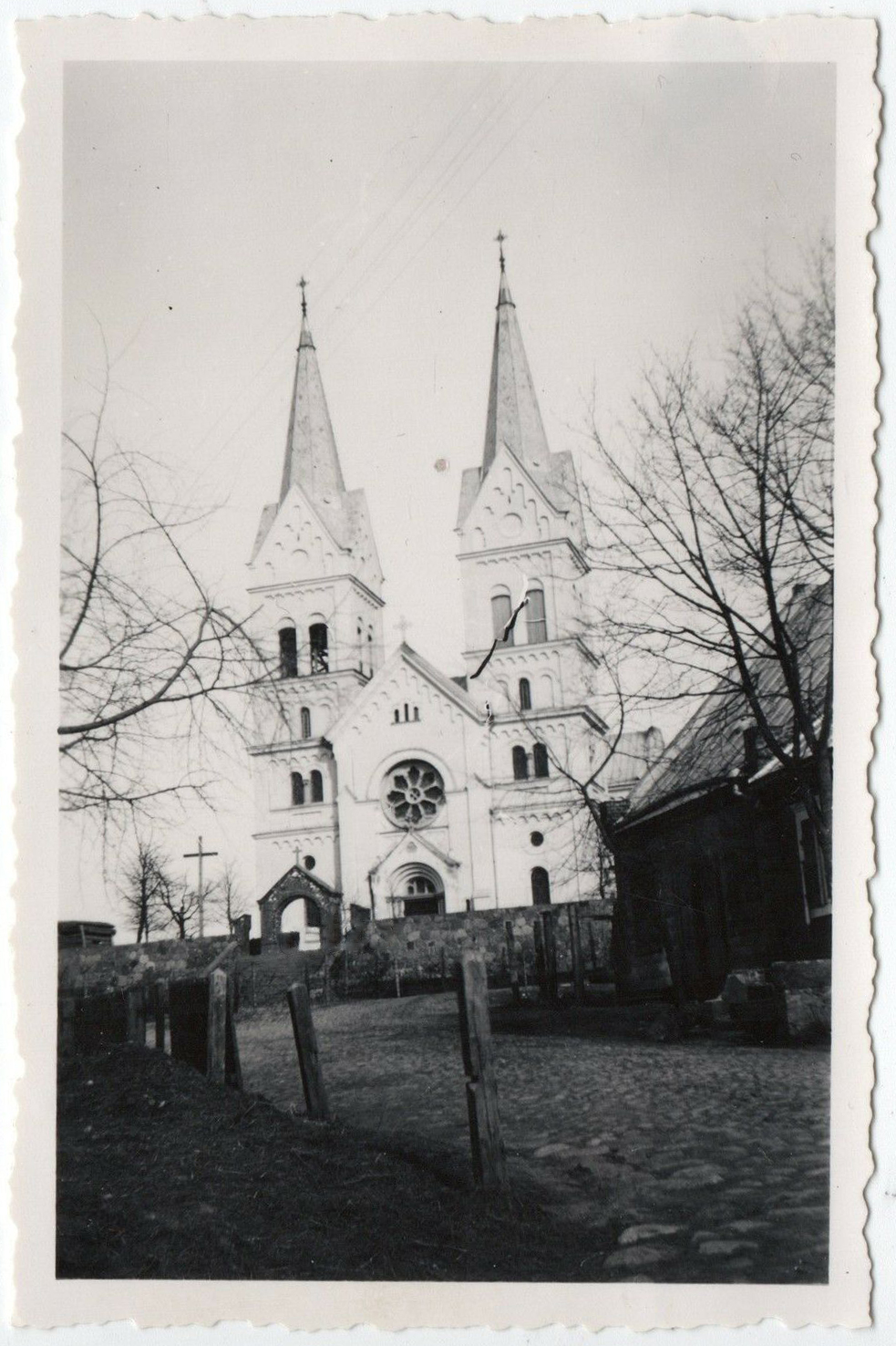
Between 1941 and 1944
