= Ikaźń =

Agrotown in Vitebsk Region, Belarus

Ikaźń Іказнь (Belarusian) Иказнь (Russian)
- Agrotown
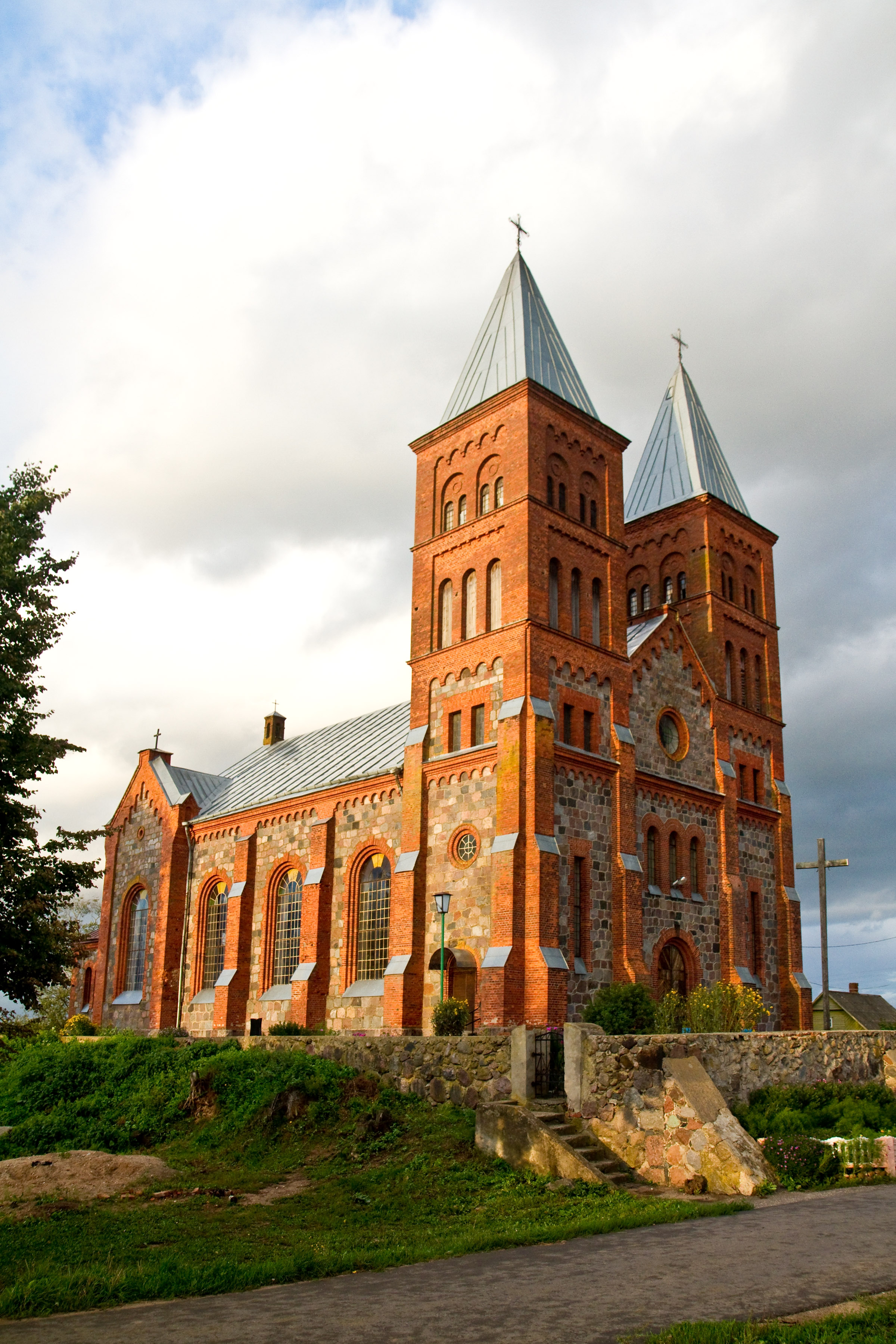
- The Church of the Corpus Christi

- Location within Belarus
- Coordinates: 55°37′18″N 27°15′31″E
- Country: Belarus
- Region: Vitebsk Region
- District: Braslaw District

Population (1931)
  - Total: 480
- Time zone: UTC+3 (MSK)

Ikaźń (Belarusian: Іказнь) is an agrotown (village until 2009) and a former town located in the Braslaw district of the Vitebsk region, Belarus.

It is the seat of the Orthodox parish (St. Nicholas the Wonderworker) and the Roman Catholic parish (Corpus Christi).

== History ==
Founded at the turn of the 15th and 16th centuries by the royal secretary Jan Stanisław Sapieha, who received the privilege to build a castle. Already in 1515, the castle was besieged by Muscovite troops, and the city burned down. In 1555, it was mentioned that there was a Helvetian congregation in Ikaźn. During the war in 1561, the castle was not captured. In 1654, the castle was occupied by the Tsardom of Moscow during the Polish-Russian war, and in 1655 by the Swedes. In the 18th century, the city was destroyed during the fighting between supporters of King Stanisław Leszczyński and Augustus the Strong, supported by Russia.

During the partitions, it was a town in the Dziesno district, in the Vilnius Governorate of the Russian Empire.

On June 27, 1919, Michał Buklarewicz was captured by the Bolsheviks and was shot together with his sister. Their tombstone bears the inscription: "Murdered for love of their homeland and people".

After the Peace of Riga, Ikaźń returned to Poland. In the years 1921–1945, the town was located in Poland, in the Vilnius Voivodeship, in the Działdowo County, and from 1926 in the Brasław County, in the Pierabroddzie commune.

According to the General Population Census of 1921, 509 people lived here, 367 were Roman Catholic, 105 Orthodox and 37 Jewish. At the same time, 247 residents declared Polish, 225 Belarusian and 37 Jewish nationality. There were 99 residential buildings here. In 1931, 480 people lived in 96 houses.
