= Church of the Corpus Christi (Ikaźń) =

Church in Ikaźń, Belarus

Coordinates: 55°37′20″N 27°30′20″E

- Касцёл Божага Цела
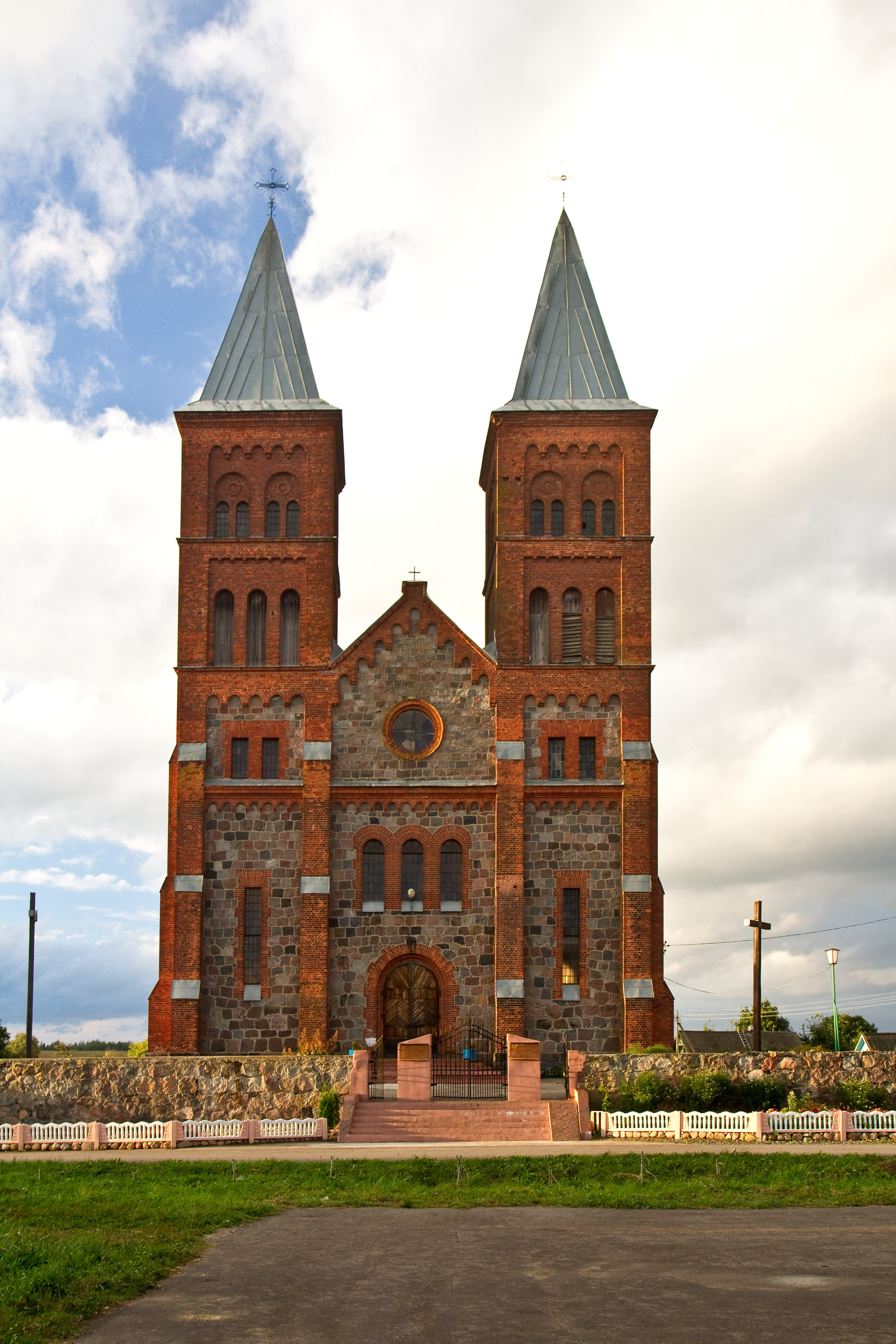
- Church of the Corpus Christi
- Location: Ikaźń
- Country: Belarus
- Denomination: Roman Catholic church

Architecture
- Years built: 1906—1912

Administration
- Diocese: Roman Catholic Diocese of Vitebsk

Church of the Corpus Christi in Ikaźń is a Belarusian Catholic church, constructed in 1906–1912.

The first wooden church in the town was built by order of Lew Sapieha in 1593. During the XVII—XVIII centuries it was burned down several times and then restored. The last time it happened during the Napoleon invasion in 1812, the reconstruction was done in 1814.

In 1906 the parish was allowed to build a new stone church. The construction lasted for 6 years and was finished in 1912 when the church was finally consecrated. A three-nave basilica with two towers, it was decorated in a Romanesque Revival style. The facades were covered with Rubble in an original manner that is called ‘Braslaw mosaics’.

== Gallery ==
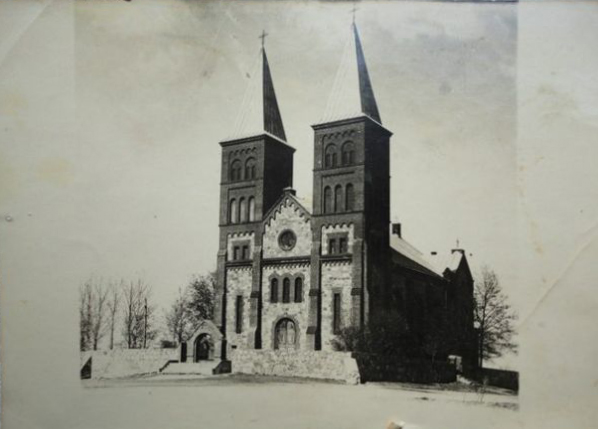
1946 Photo

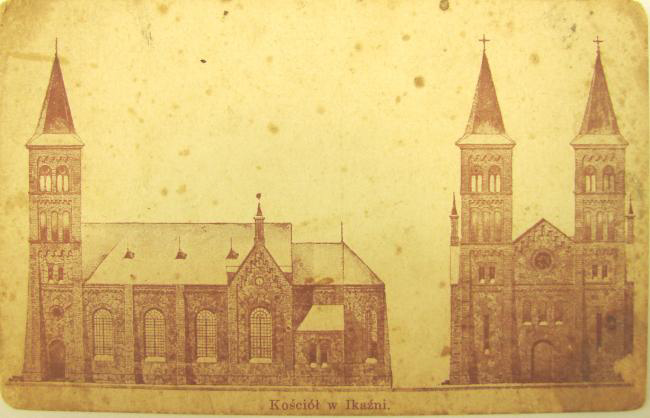
Painting, 1912

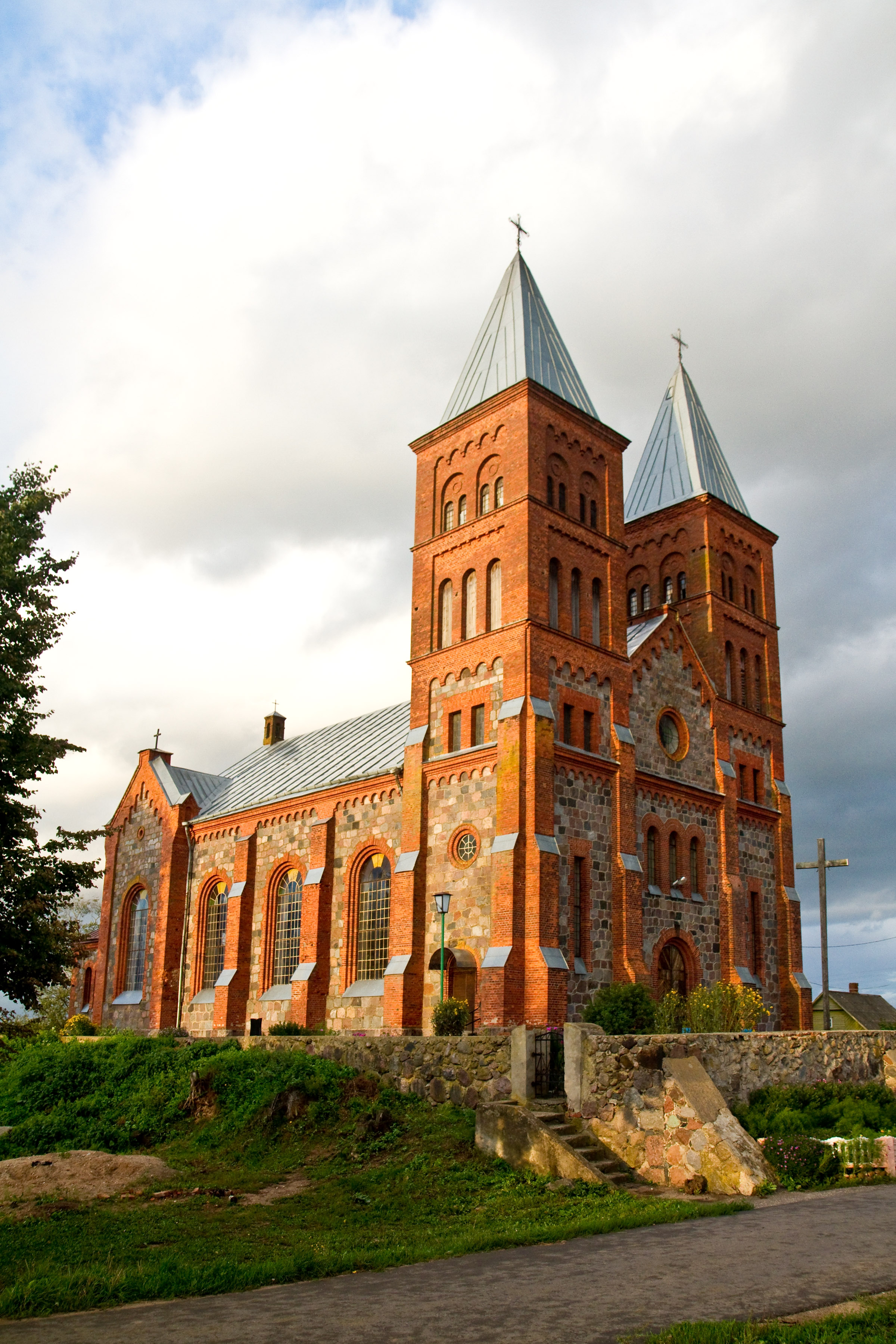
Church in 2010
