= Diocese of Vitebsk =

Roman Catholic diocese in Belarus

Coordinates: 55.1632°N 30.2154°E

Diocese of Vitebsk Dioecesis Vitebscensis Віцебскай дыяцэзіі

Catholic

Location
- Country: Belarus
- Ecclesiastical province: Minsk-Mohilev
- Metropolitan: Minsk-Mohilev

Statistics
- Area: 40,000 km^{2} (15,000 sq mi)
- Population: Total; Catholics: (as of 2014); 1,431,800; 172,000 (12%)

Information
- Sui iuris church: Latin Church
- Rite: Latin Rite
- Cathedral: Cathedral of the Merciful Jesus, Vitebsk

Current leadership
- Pope: Leo XIV
- Bishop: Aleh Butkevich
- Metropolitan Archbishop: Tadeusz Kondrusiewicz
- Bishops emeritus: Wladyslaw Blin

Map
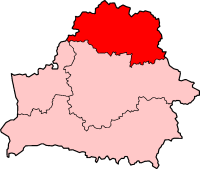

The Diocese of Vitebsk (Latin: Vitebscen(sis), Belarusian: Віцебская) is a Latin Church diocese of the Catholic Church located in the city of Vitebsk in the ecclesiastical province of Minsk-Mohilev in Belarus.

== History ==
On 13 October 1999, the Diocese of Vitebsk was established from the Metropolitan Archdiocese of Minsk-Mohilev. That same year, the diocesan Caritas (Belarusian: Карытас Віцебскай дыяцэзіі) was set up.

== Leadership ==
- Bishops of Vitebsk (Roman rite)
  - Wladyslaw Blin (Уладзіслаў Блін) (since 13 Oct 1999)
  - Aleh Butkevich (Алег Буткевіч) (since 29 Nov 2013)

== Churches ==
- Church of the Divine Providence in Słobódka
- Church of the Corpus Christi in Ikaźń

== See also ==
- Roman Catholicism in Belarus

== Sources ==
- Official website
- GCatholic.org
- Catholic Hierarchy
