= Pierabroddzie =

Village in Vitebsk Region, Belarus

Pierabodzie Пераброддзе (Belarusian) Перабодзье (Russian) Pierabroddzie
- Village
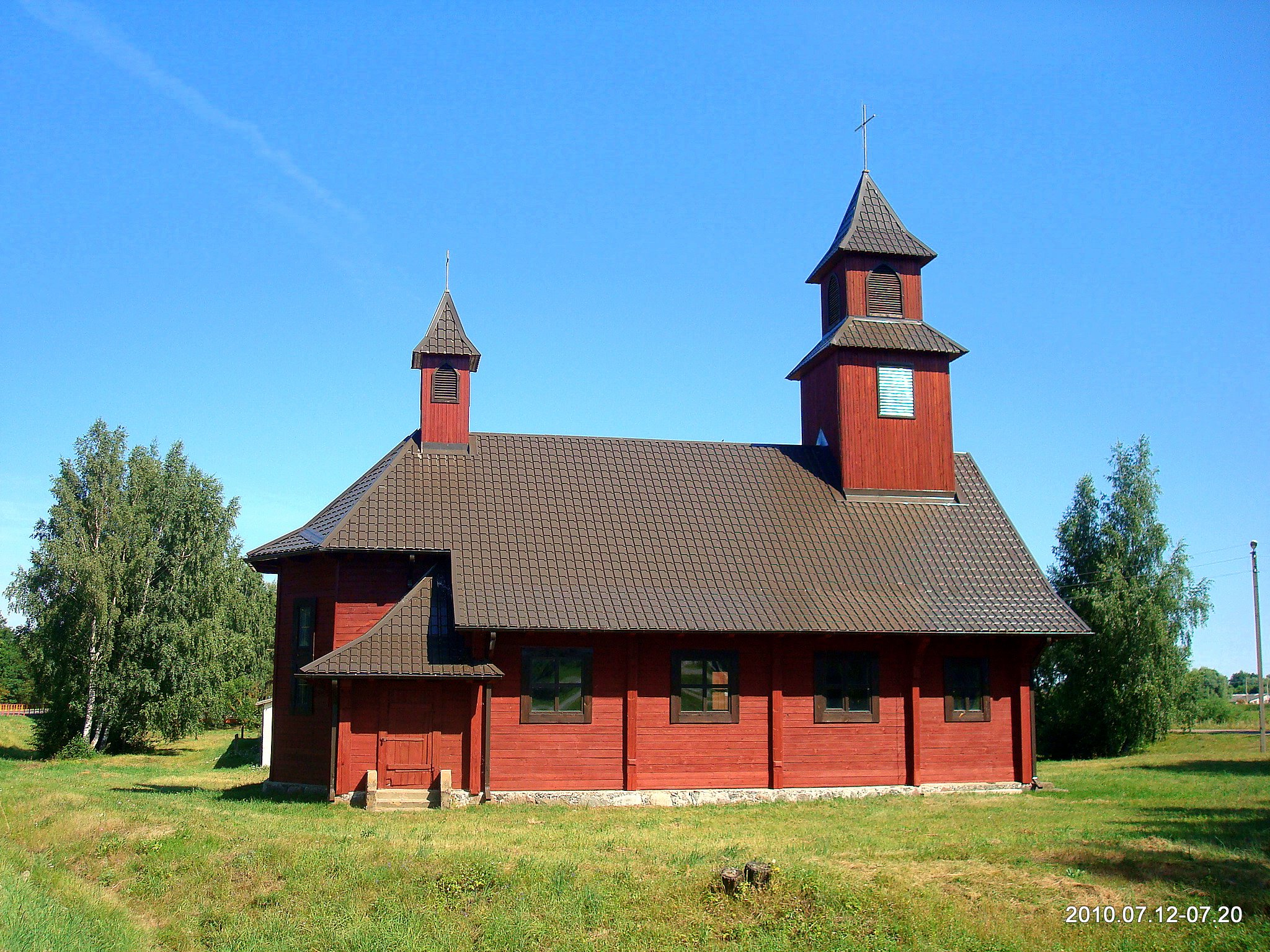
- The Church of the Sacred Heart of Jesus

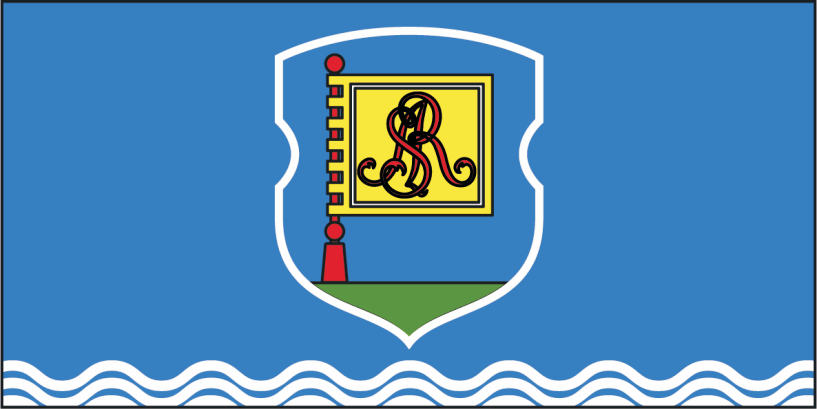
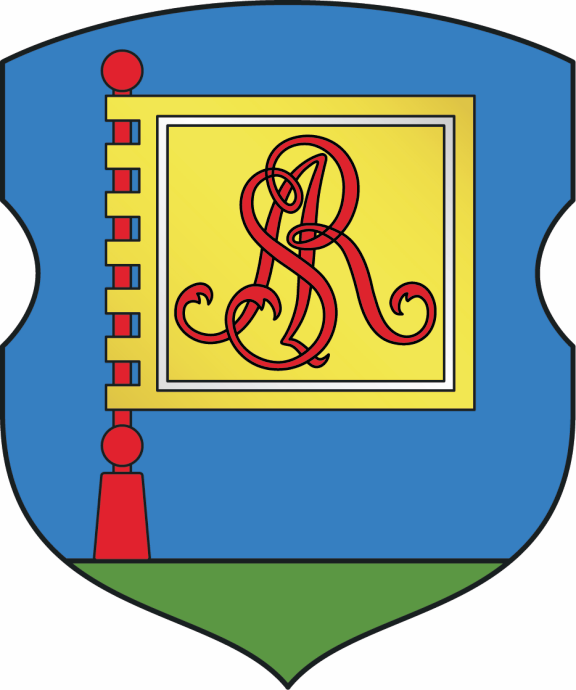
- Flag Coat of arms

- Location within Belarus
- Coordinates: 55°38′36″N 27°27′12″E
- Country: Belarus
- Region: Vitebsk Region
- District: Braslaw District

Population (2009)
  - Total: 233
- Time zone: UTC+3 (MSK)

Pierabodzie (or Pierabroddzie) (Belarusian: Пераброддзе) is a village in Belarus, in the Braslaw District (administratively in the Miory district), in the Vitebsk region; it is 19 km east of Braslav.

Pierabroddzie have the Orthodox parish church of St. George the Conqueror and the Roman Catholic church of the Sacred Heart of Jesus.

== History ==
The royal city was located at the end of the 18th century in the Braslaw starosty, in the Braslaw county, and the Vilnius voivodeship. City law was granted by Stanisław August Poniatowski in 1792, pursuant to the privilege of Sigismund II Augustus from 1571, where the existence of the town of Przebrodzia was proven.

The faithful belonged to the Roman Catholic parish and Orthodox in Nowy Pohost. The town was subordinate to the District Court in Drui and the District Court in Vilnius; the proper post office was located in Nowy Pohost.

As a result of the Soviet attack on Poland in September 1939, the town came under Soviet occupation. On November 2, it was incorporated into the Belarusian SSR. From June 1941, under German occupation. In 1944, the town was re-occupied by Soviet troops and incorporated into the BSSR.
