= St. Nicholas' Church, Mir =

Church in Mir, Belarus

Coordinates: 53°27′10″N 26°27′56″E

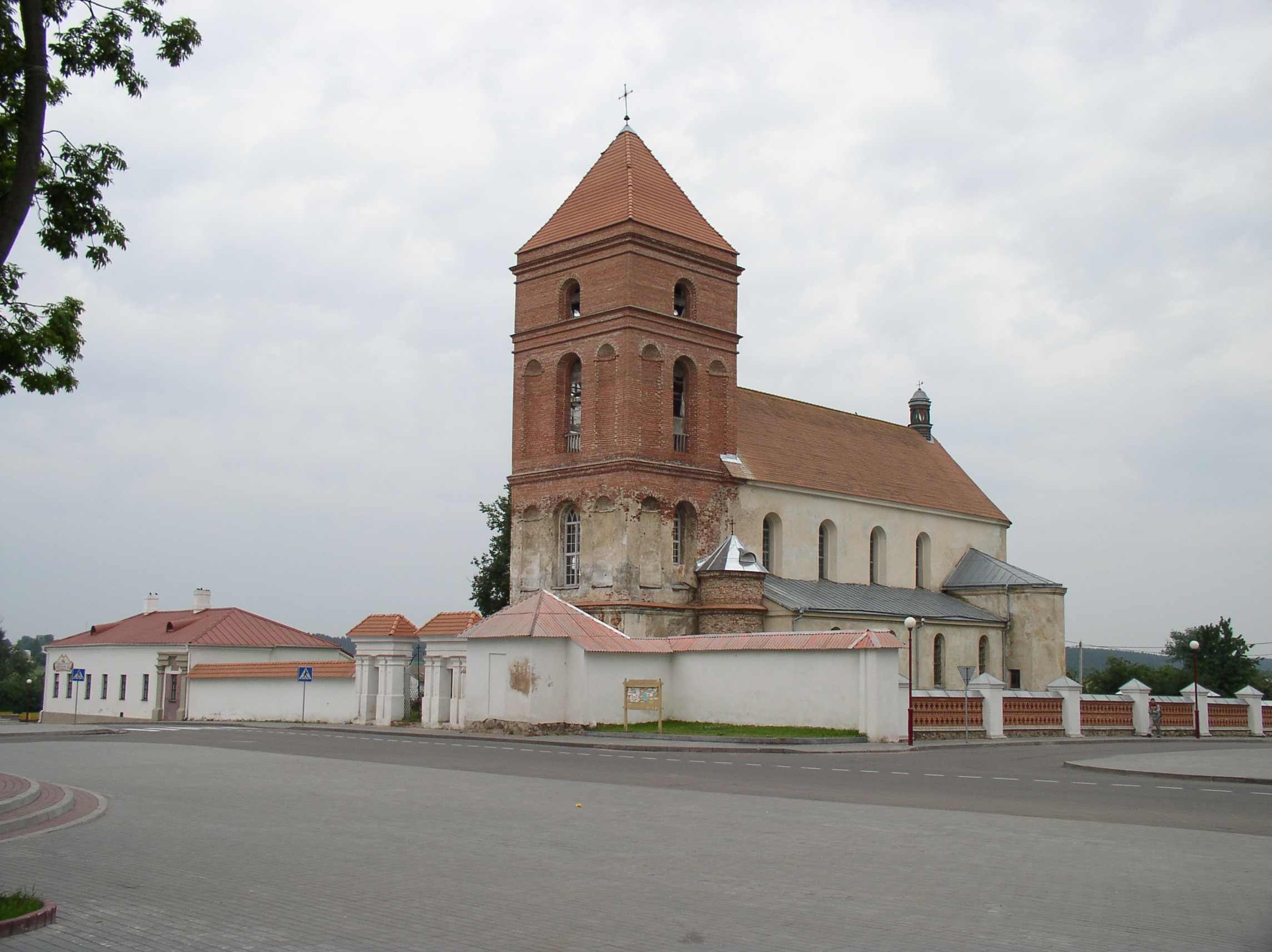
Saint Nicolas' Church in Mir

Saint Nicolas' Roman Catholic Church in Mir, Belarus, is a Renaissance church commissioned by Mikołaj Krzysztof "the Orphan" Radziwiłł. It was probably designed by Giovanni Maria Bernardoni and erected without his personal participation in 1599–1605. The church tower was partly destroyed during the Soviet period, and recently restored.

== Sources ==
- Т. Габрусь, Саборы помняць усё, Мінск, 2007, с. 104–107. (in Belarusian)
