= Cathedral of the Merciful Jesus, Vitebsk =

Cathedral of the Merciful Jesus
- Кафедральны сабор Ісуса Міласэрнага
- Cathedral of the Merciful Jesus
- 55°09′48″N 30°12′56″E
- Location: Vitebsk
- Country: Belarus
- Denomination: Roman Catholic Church

The Cathedral of the Merciful Jesus (Belarusian: Катэдральны сабор Ісуса Міласэрнага, romanized: Katedraĺny sabor Isusa Milasernaha) also called Vitebsk Cathedral It is the name given to a religious building that is located in Vitebsk, a city in Belarus.

The cathedral follows the Roman or Latin rite and serves as the cathedral of the Diocese of Vitebsk (Dioecesis Vitebscensis or Віцебскай дыяцэзіі) which was created in 1999 by bull "Ad aptius consulendum" by Pope John Paul II.

The laying of the first stone took place in 2004. The church, dedicated to Merciful Jesus in October 2009, was elevated to the cathedral by Pope Benedict XVI on 18 June 2011. On the occasion of the 30th anniversary of the election of Pope John Paul II, the Polish Catholics donated to the diocese a monument depicting Pope placed outside the cathedral.

== See also ==
- Roman Catholicism in Belarus
