= Co-Cathedral of the Assumption of the Virgin and St. Stanislaus, Mogilev =

Coordinates: 53.8983°N 30.3339°E

Co-Cathedral of the Assumption of the Blessed Virgin and St. Stanislaus
- Унебаўзяцця Найсвяцейшай Панны Марыі і св. Станіслава
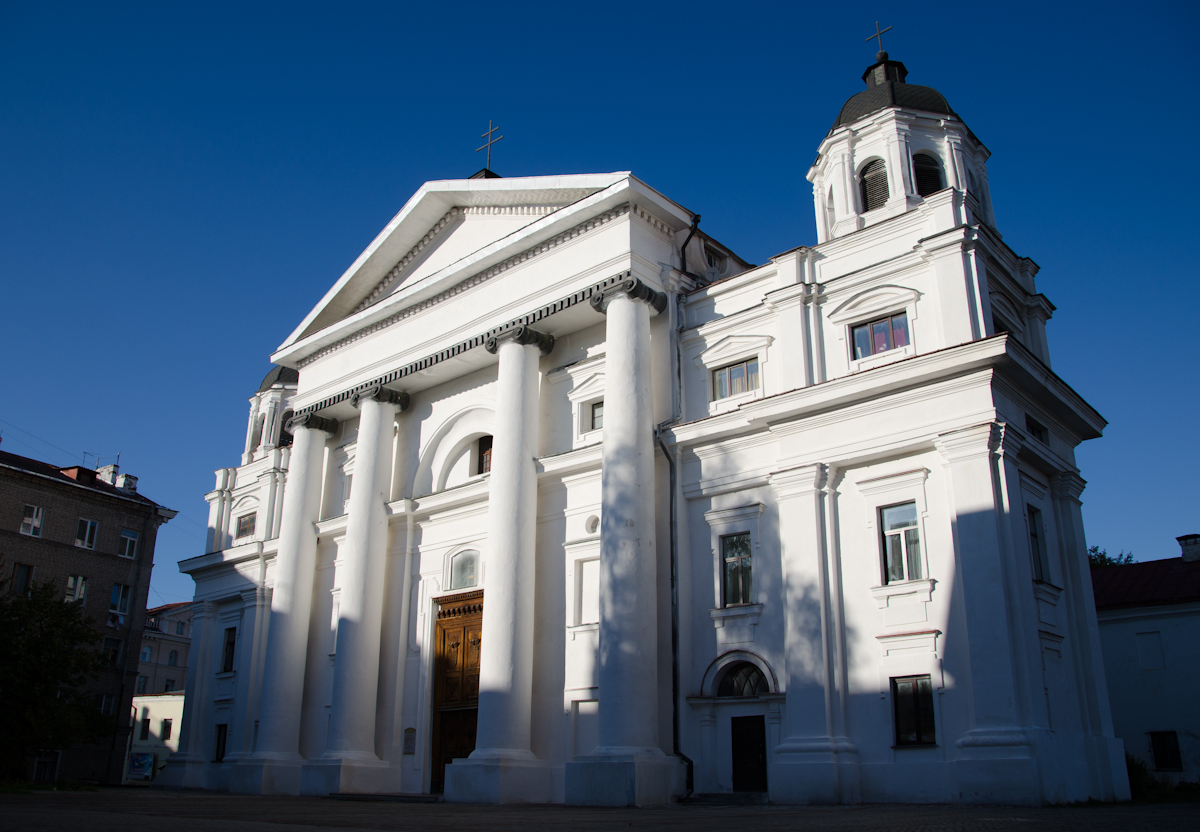
- Co-Cathedral of the Assumption of the Blessed Virgin and St. Stanislaus
- Location: Mogilev
- Country: Belarus
- Denomination: Latin Church

The Co-Cathedral of the Assumption of the Blessed Virgin and St. Stanislaus (Belarusian: Унебаўзяцця Найсвяцейшай Панны Марыі і св. Станіслава) also called Mogilev Cathedral It is a Catholic church in Mogilev, Belarus, which functions as co-cathedral or alternate cathedral of the Archdiocese of Minsk-Mogilev.

The cathedral is located at the site was a former convent of the Carmelites. In 1636 the monastery was built a wooden church dedicated to the Assumption of St. Mary. In 1708 a great fire burned the church and its place in the years 1738 to 1752 a stone church, consecrated in 1765 by Bishop of Vilnius Zenkovich was built. On December 25, 1772 Catherine II of Russia announced the establishment of a Catholic diocese of Byelorussia based in Mogilev. Ten years later, the diocese was elevated as archdiocese of Mohilev with jurisdiction over all of Latin rite Catholic parishes in Russia, including Moscow and St. Petersburg. Since 1783 the Carmelite monastery church became the cathedral of the Archdiocese of Mogilev, assuming its current name.

In the late eighteenth century, the cathedral was rebuilt with interventions focused mainly facade. In 1956 in the Soviet Union times the cathedral was closed and used to house the headquarters of the Belarusian part of the historical archives of the USSR. In 1960, the file was transferred to Minsk and the old building of the cathedral was transformed into the State Archive of Mogilev region.

In early 1990, the cathedral was returned to the diocese, which began a restoration that was completed in 1994 and then became the co-cathedral of the Archdiocese of Minsk-Mogilev.

== See also ==
- Catholic Church in Belarus
- Assumption Cathedral (disambiguation), other cathedrals dedicated to the Assumption

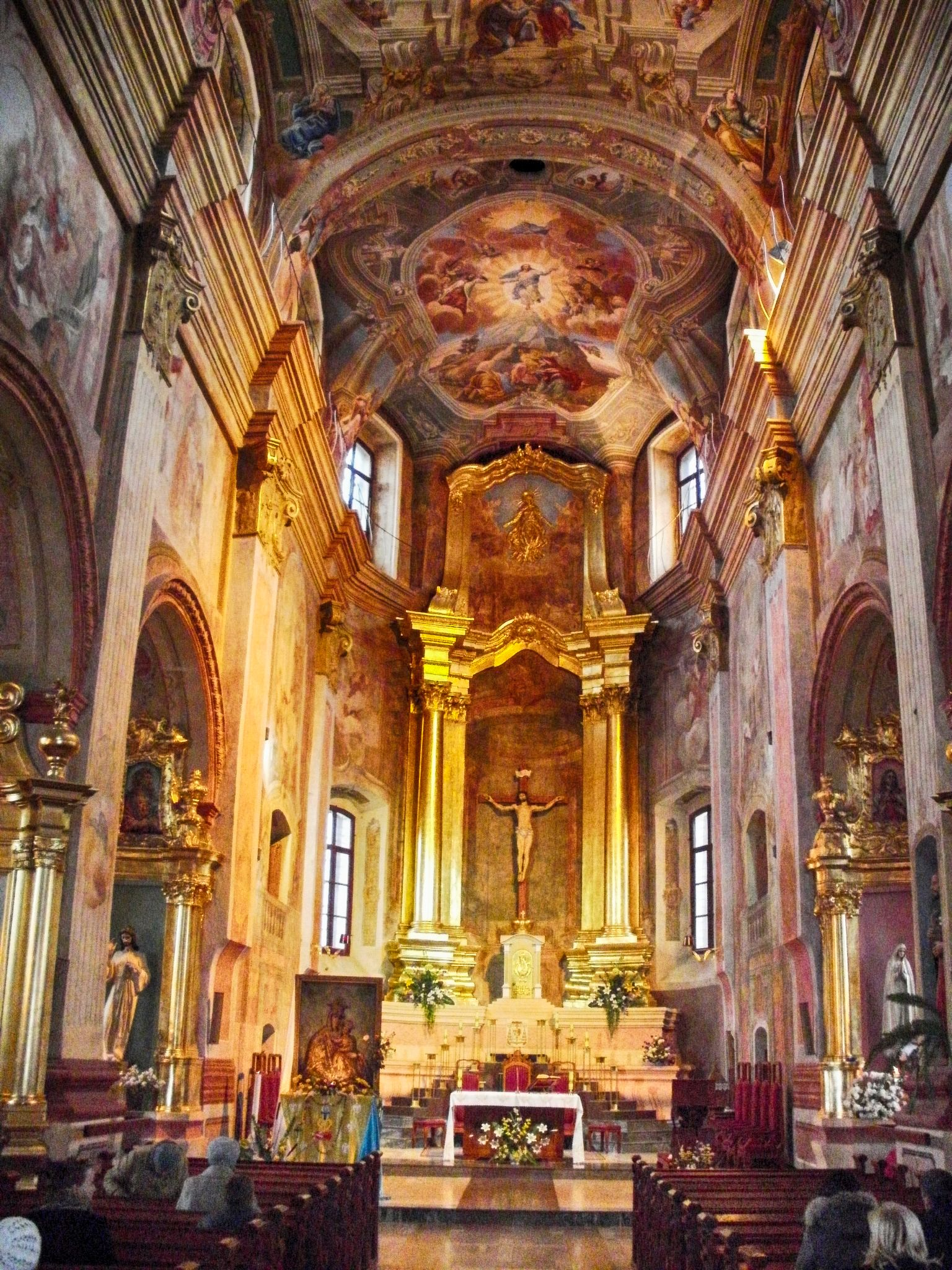
Interior view
