= Kazimierz Świątek =

Belarusian Roman Catholic cardinal and human rights activist (1914–2011)

His Eminence Kazimierz Świątek
- Cardinal Archbishop of Minsk-Mohilev
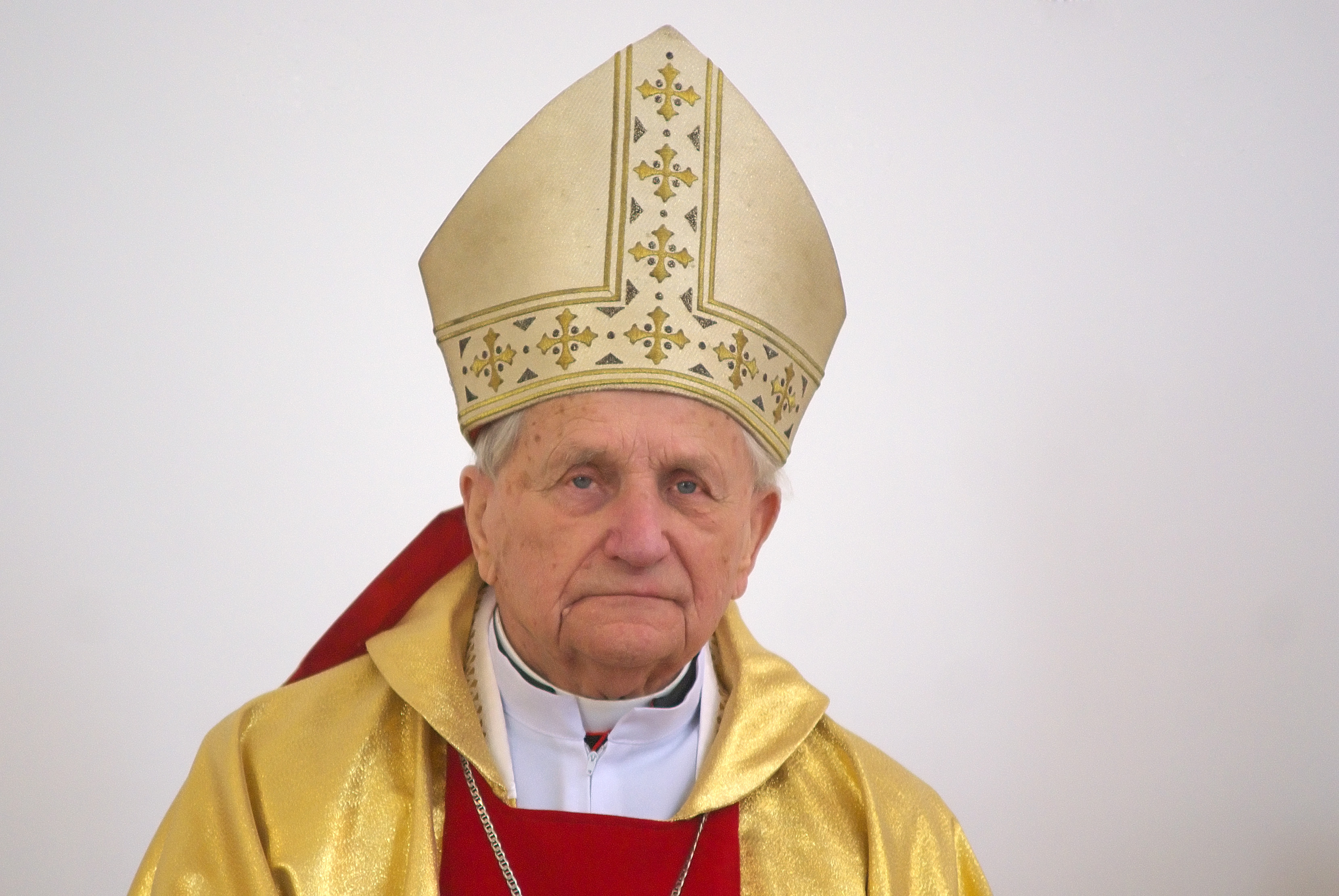
- Church: Roman Catholic
- Archdiocese: Minsk-Mohilev
- Installed: 21 May 1991
- Term ended: 14 June 2006
- Predecessor: Zygmunt Konstanty Antoni Łoziński
- Successor: Tadeusz Kondrusiewicz
- Other posts: Cardinal-Priest of San Gerardo Maiella; Apostolic Administrator of Pinsk (1991-2006)

Orders
- Ordination: 8 April 1939
- Consecration: 21 May 1991
- Created cardinal: 26 November 1994 by John Paul II
- Rank: Cardinal-Priest

Personal details
- Born: 21 October 1914 Valga, Russian Empire (now Estonia)
- Died: 21 July 2011 (aged 96) Pinsk, Belarus
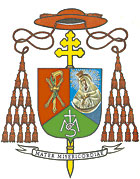
- Coat of arms

Styles of Kazimierz Świątek
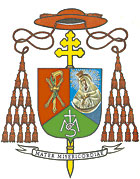
- Reference style: His Eminence
- Spoken style: Your Eminence
- Informal style: Cardinal
- See: Pinsk (emeritus)

Kazimierz Cardinal Świątek (Belarusian: Казімір Свёнтак, romanized: Kazimir Sviontak; 21 October 1914 – 21 July 2011) was a cardinal of the Roman Catholic Church who was most known for his resistance to Cold War-era Soviet communism and for his service in Minsk, Belarus. Cardinal Swiatek was the former Metropolitan Archbishop of Minsk-Mohilev, and Apostolic Administrator of Pinsk.

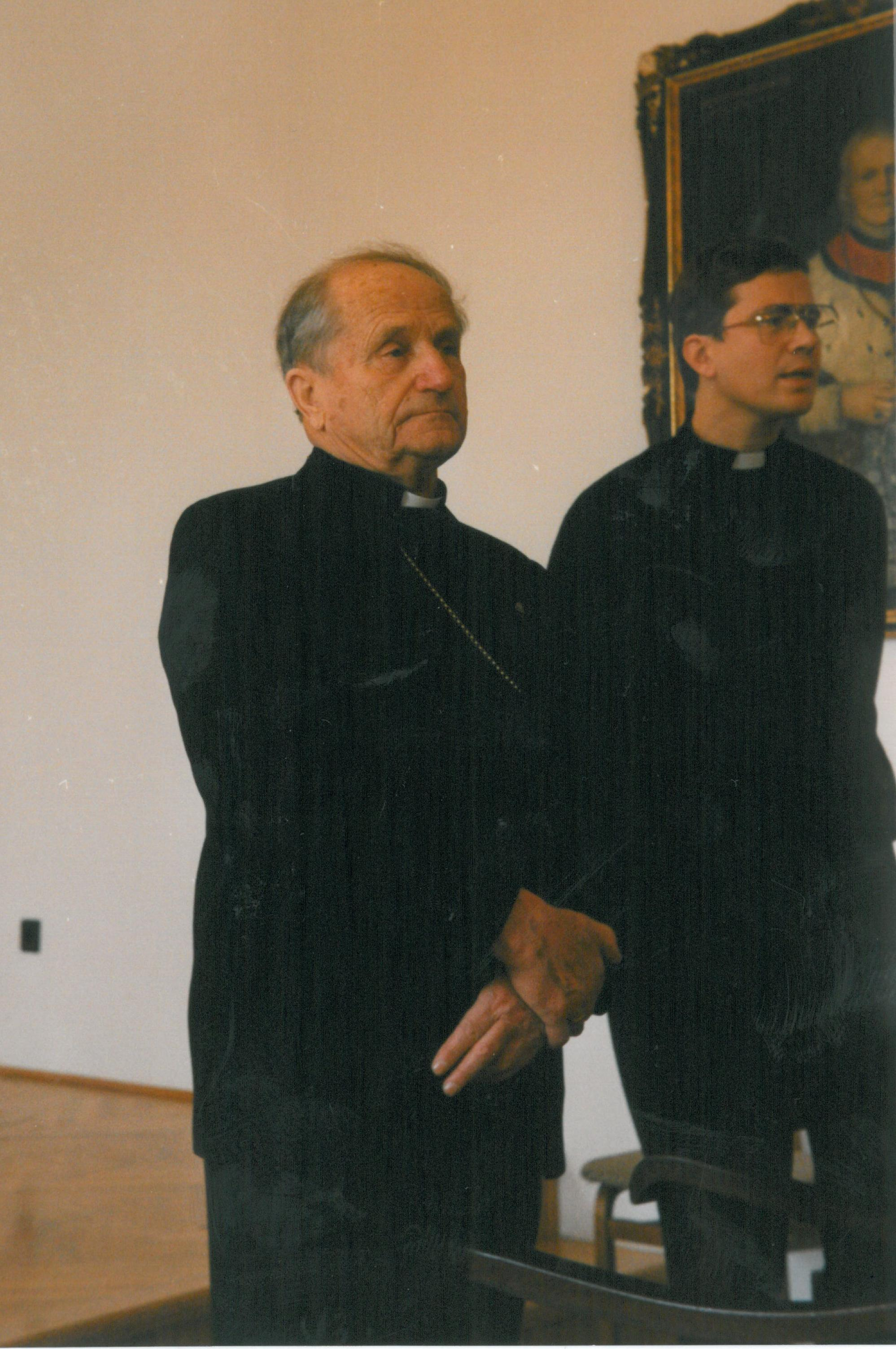
Card.Kazimierz Świątek visits seminarists in Esztergom, Hungary in 1996

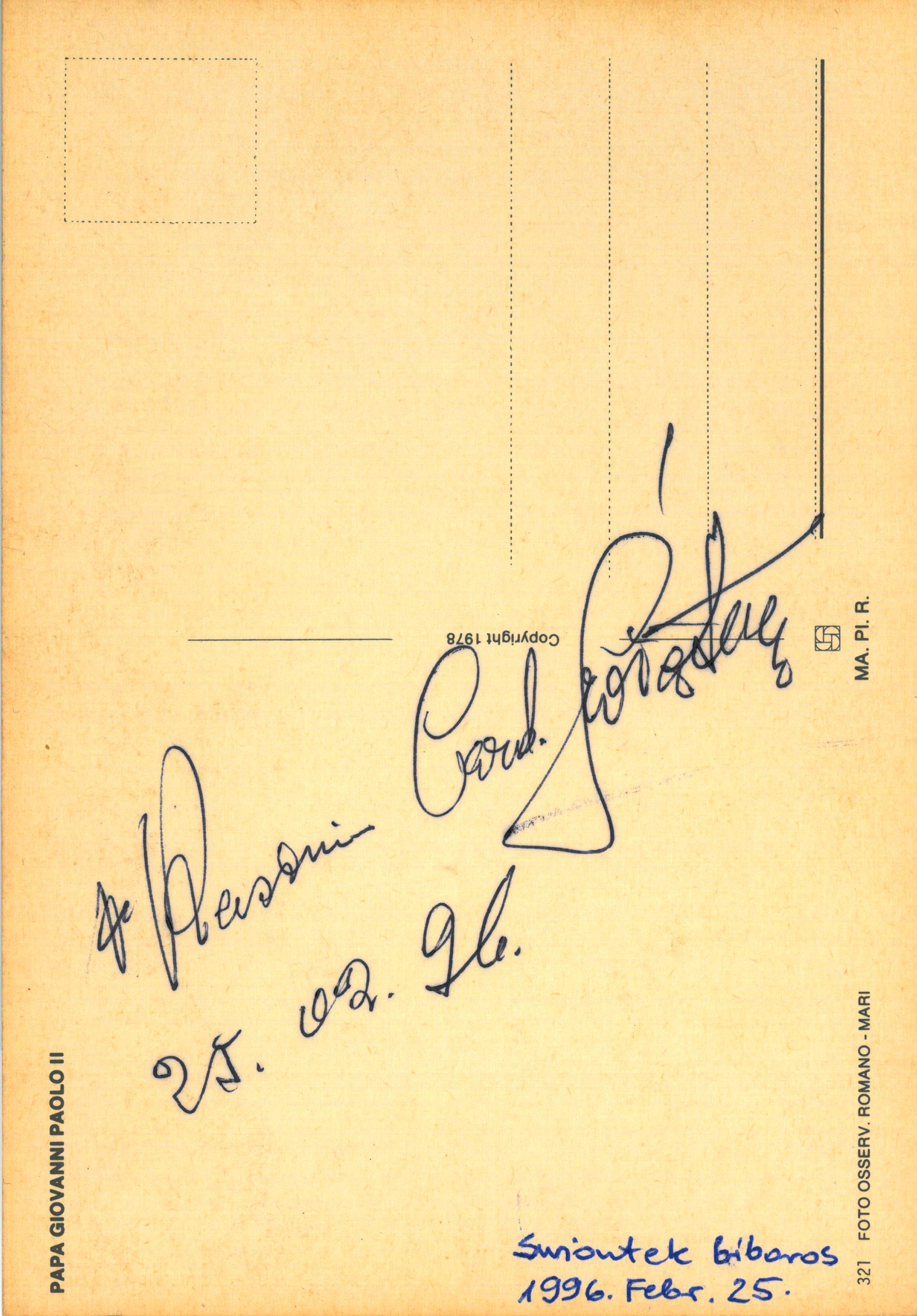
Card.Kazimierz Świątek's autograph signed in Esztergom, Hungary (25 February 1996)

Świątek was born to Polish parents in the municipality of Walk, in what was then the Russian Empire, the present-day municipality of Valga, Estonia. His family was deported to Siberia during the Russian Revolution. His father died fighting in the Polish-Soviet War. The future Cardinal lived in newly independent Poland from 1922. After completing his philosophical and theological studies at the seminary in Pinsk, Świątek was ordained as a Roman Catholic priest in 1939, and then was sent to the parish of Pruzhany.

The Soviet Union occupied Pinsk after the Nazi-Soviet Pact divided Poland in 1939. Świątek was arrested by the NKVD in April 1941, and held on death row in Brest for two months. Father Świątek escaped from prison, taking advantage of the confusion caused by the Nazi German invasion of the Soviet Union on 22 June 1941, and returned to Pruzhany. In December 1944, the NKVD arrested Swiatek for a second time. The following year he was sentenced to 10 years hard labor in a concentration camp, and spent nine years in Siberia and the north of the Soviet Union, working in the taiga and in the mines. After his release in June 1954, he returned to Pinsk.

In 1988, he was made a Monsignor by Pope John Paul II, who in 1991 appointed him Metropolitan Archbishop of Minsk-Mohilev and Apostolic Administrator of Pinsk, and on 26 November 1994 created him Cardinal-Priest of San Gerardo Maiella. He was elected as the first President of the Conference of Catholic Bishops of Belarus, which according to the church's website "underlines his leading role in the Church in Belarus."

In July 2006, Świątek, then aged 91, his resignation for reasons of age and declining health from the offices of Metropolitan Archbishop of Minsk-Mohilev was accepted by Pope Benedict XVI, but he remained Apostolic Administrator of Pinsk until 30 June 2011, when Tadeusz Kondrusiewicz, his successor as Metropolitan Archbishop of Minsk-Mohilev, replaced him also as Apostolic Administrator of Pinsk.

== Death ==
On 21 July 2011, Świątek died in Pinsk after a long illness, aged 96. At the time of his death, he was the second oldest member of the College of Cardinals. Pope Benedict XVI sent a telegram to Archbishop Kondrusiewicz and the Conference of Catholic Bishops of Belarus expressing his condolences for the Cardinal's death and praising him for his lengthy service as Cardinal Archbishop and his continuing fidelity and loyalty to the Church and to Christ during his periods of imprisonment back in the early years of the Cold War, in the post-war period, when the Church in the Soviet Union had to be largely clandestine.
