= Catholic Church in Belarus =

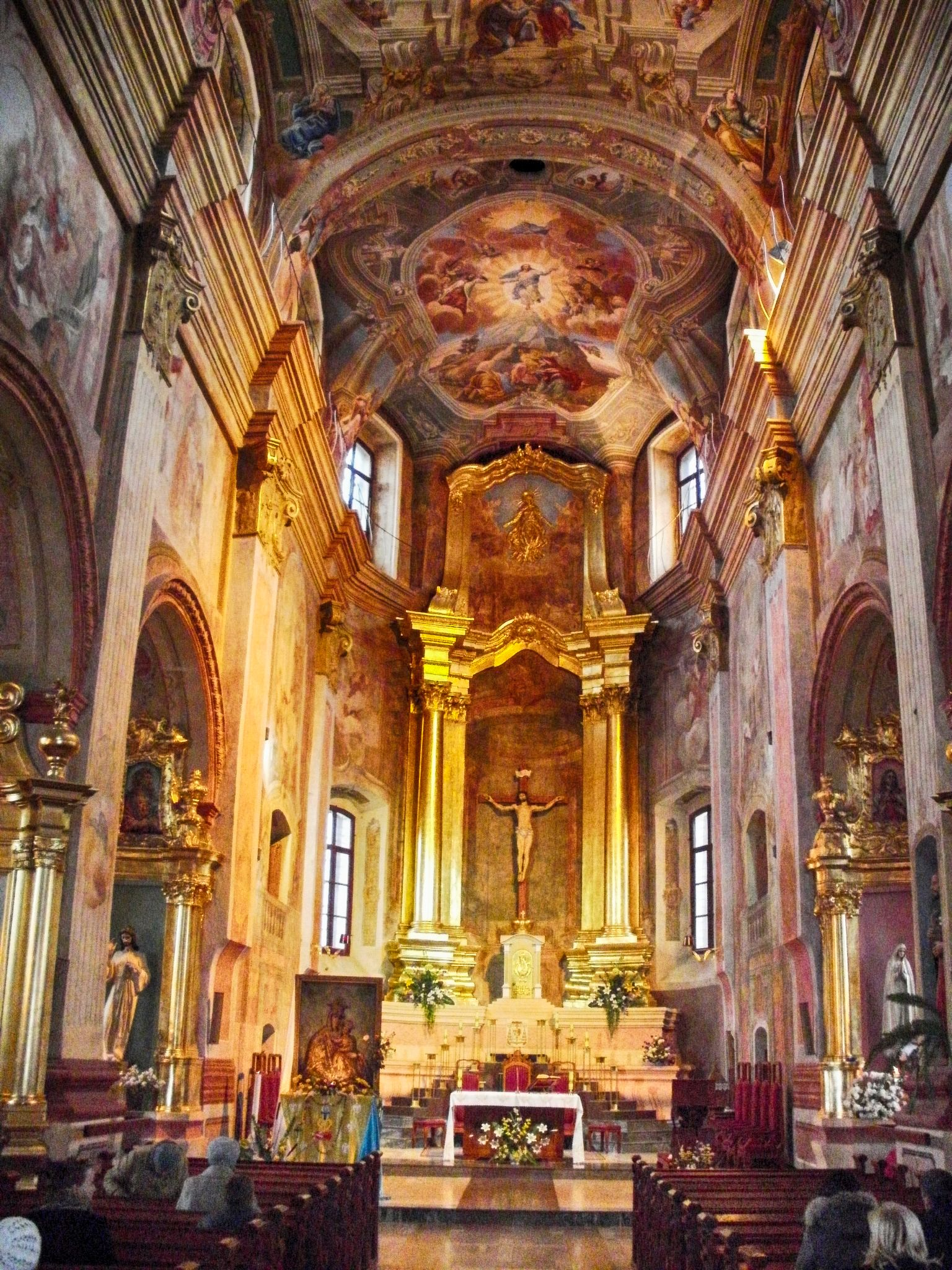
Cathedral of Saint Stanislaus in Mahilyow

The Catholic Church in Belarus is part of the worldwide Catholic Church, under the spiritual leadership of the Pope in Rome. The first Latin Church diocese in Belarus was established in Turaŭ between 1008 and 1013. In the subsequent centuries, Catholicism gradually became a dominant religion of Belarusian nobility (the szlachta) and of a large part of the population of West Belarus.

== Description ==
According to official government data, As of 2015, there were 674,500 Catholics in the country, about 7.1% of the total population. Figures in 2020 state that 10.58% of the population is Catholic. Other surveys put the figure as much higher.

Most Catholics belong to the Latin Church. A small minority are Eastern Catholics who worship according to the Byzantine Rite, forming the Belarusian Greek Catholic Church.

Polish and Lithuanian minorities in Belarus are predominantly Latin-Rite Catholics. The Greek Catholics are mostly ethnic Belarusians, with some Ukrainians.

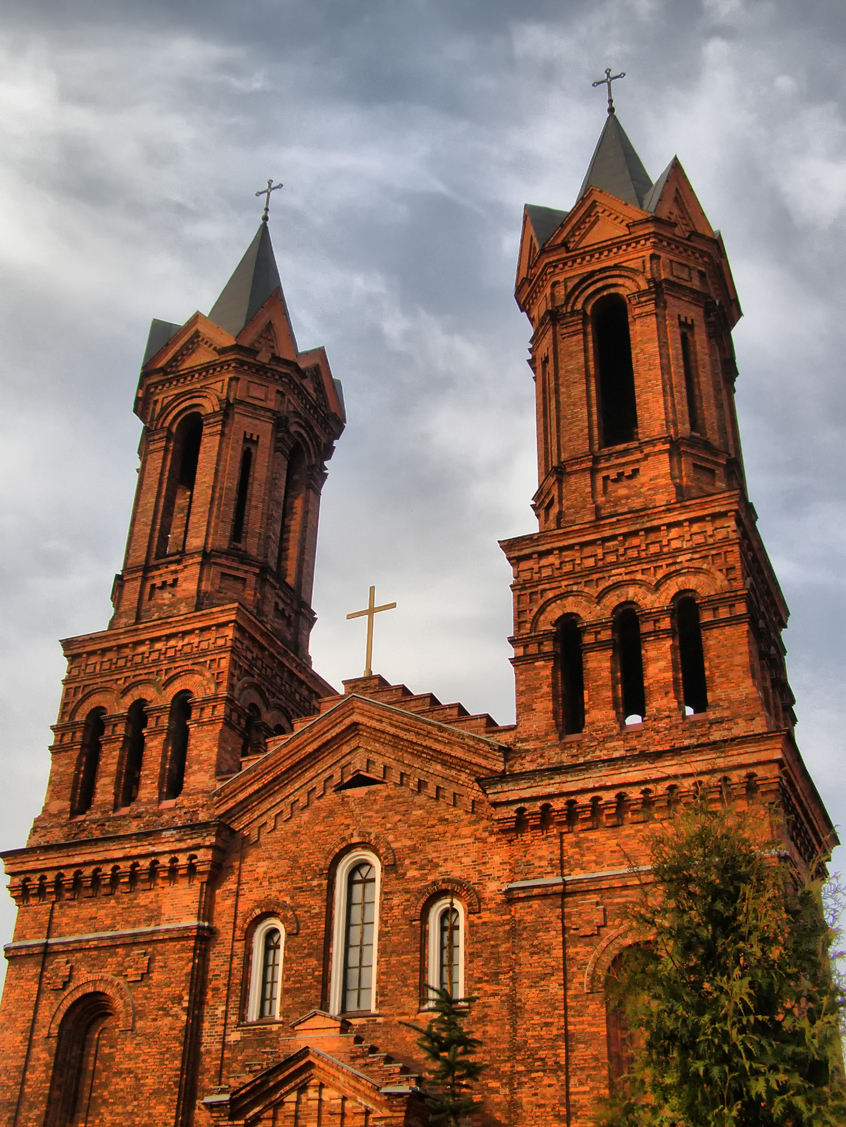
Church of Saint Barbara in Viciebsk

The national Caritas Belarus and the four diocesan Caritas organisations are the social arm of the Catholic Church in the country.

== Hierarchy ==
The numbers of adherents given below are self-reported by the Catholic Church as of 2009.

One Latin metropolitan archdiocese:

- Minsk-Mohilev - 610,490 Catholics

Three Latin suffragan dioceses:

- Grodno - 591,000 Catholics
- Pinsk - 50,115 Catholics
- Vitebsk - 151,000 Catholics

Metropolitan Archbishop Josephus Romualdovitsche Stanevskiej has been the leader of the Latin Church in Belarus since 2021. The apostolic administrator for the Belarusian Greek Catholics is the Rt. Rev. Mitred Archimandrite Jan Sergiusz Gajek, M.I.C.

== History ==
The first Latin Church diocese in Belarus was established in Turaŭ between 1008 and 1013. Catholicism was a traditionally dominant religion of Belarusian nobility (the szlachta) and of a large part of the population of western and northwestern parts of Belarus. There was once an Archeparchy of Polotsk-Vitebsk of the Ruthenian Uniate Church. Josaphat Kuntsevych was archbishop from 1618 to 1623, succeeding another archbishop.

In August 2020, the leader of the Catholic Church in Belarus, Tadevuš Kandrusievič, was banned from returning to Belarus from Poland for several months after condemning violence during mass protests. In July 2021, Alexander Lukashenko tried to intervene in the prayer schedule warning Catholic priests not to perform the religious song "The Almighty God" (Belarusian: Магутны Божа).

In March 2023, Pope Francis established an Apostolic Administration for the faithful of the Byzantine Rite in Belarus.

== See also ==
- Belarusian Greek Catholic Church
- Apostolic Nunciature to Belarus
- Catholic Church by country
- Religion in Belarus
- Freedom of religion in Belarus
