= Březina =

Březina may refer to:

== People ==
- Březina (surname), a Czech surname

== Places in the Czech Republic ==
- Březina (former Blansko District), a municipality and village in the South Moravian Region
- Březina (Jičín District), a municipality and village in the Hradec Králové Region
- Březina (Jindřichův Hradec District), a municipality and village in the South Bohemian Region
- Březina (Mladá Boleslav District), a municipality and village in the Central Bohemian Region
- Březina (Rokycany District), a municipality and village in the Plzeň Region
- Březina (Svitavy District), a municipality and village in the Pardubice Region
- Březina (former Tišnov District), a municipality and village in the South Moravian Region
- Březina, a village and part of Hořepník in the Vysočina Region
- Březina, a village and part of Luká in the Olomouc Region
- Březina, a village and part of Nové Sady (Vyškov District) in the South Moravian Region
- Březina, a village and part of Vlastějovice in the Central Bohemian Region
- Březina, a military training area in the South Moravian Region

== See also ==
- Brezina (disambiguation)
