= Berezina (disambiguation) =

Berezina may refer to:

- Berezina River
- Western Berezina river
- Berezina Island, South Shetlands
- Russian replenishment ship Berezina
- Feminine form of the surname Berezin
- Soborne, a village in Ukraine known as Berezina in Romanian

== See also ==
- Beresina, or the Last Days of Switzerland, a 1999 film
- Brezina (disambiguation)
- Březina (disambiguation)
- Battle of Berezina (disambiguation)
