= Marian Zdziechowski =

Polish philosopher (1861–1938)

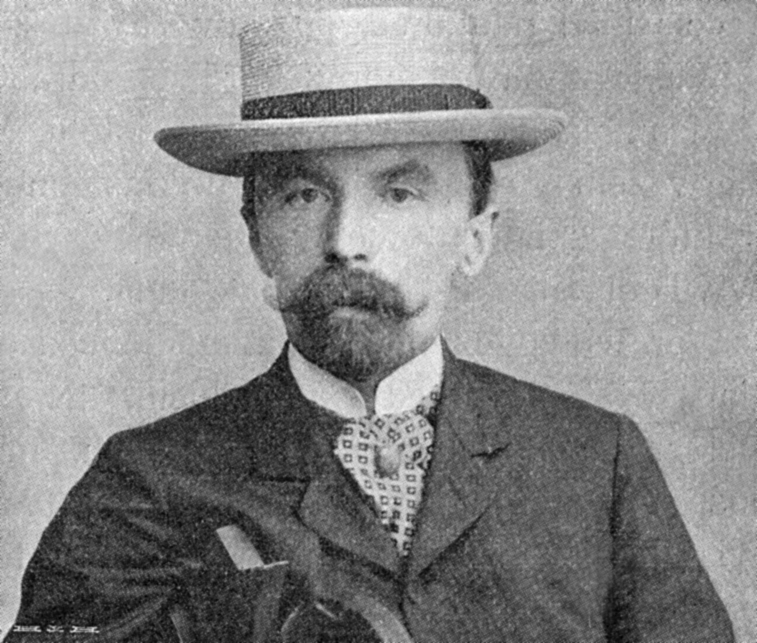
- Portrait of Zdziechowski, prior to 1904
- Born: Marian Ursyn Zdziechowsk; April 30, 1861; Minsky Uyezd, Minsk Governorate, Russian Empire
- Died: October 5, 1938 (aged 77); Wilno, Wilno Voivodeship, Second Polish Republic
- Board member of: Society of Friends of Science in Wilno
- Relatives: Kazimierz Zdziechowski

Academic background
- Education: Saint Petersburg Imperial University; Kaiserliche Universität zu Dorpat
- Alma mater: Jagiellonian University
- Thesis: Mesjaniści i Słowianofile
- Doctoral advisor: Stanisław Tarnowski
- Influences: Philosophical pessimism

Academic work
- Discipline: Philosophy
- Institutions: Jagiellonian University; Stephen Báthory University
- Main interests: Catastrophism; Romanticism

Marian Zdziechowski (30 April 1861, Nowosiółki, Minsk Governorate – 5 October 1938, Wilno) was a Polish philosopher, Slavist, publicist and cultural historian. He was a critic of fascist and communist totalitarianism, and was considered a representative of catastrophism and philosophical pessimism. He was a brother of the writer Kazimierz Zdziechowski.

At Jagiellonian University he became a lecturer in 1888 and a professor in 1899, followed by being a professor at Stephen Báthory University (currently Vilnius University) from 1919 to 1931, with a rectorship from 1925 to 1927 and 1925–1927. He became a member of the Academy of Learning in 1902. Honoris causa in universities of Vilnius, Tartu and Szeged.

The grave of Marian Zdziechowski in the Antakalnis cemetery

His area of study was historical, literary, philosophical and religious problems. He was an initiator of the Slavic Club in Kraków which was active from 1901 to 1914 and periodical Świat Słowiański (Slavic World) published in the years of 1905–1914. Zdziechowski propagated the idea of cooperation between all of Slavs. He was interested mainly in the problem of evil, modernism in Roman Catholic Church, ideology of Romanticism, and crisis of European culture, in which he indicated fascism and communism as a dangerous. He referred to thoughts of Vladimir Solovyov, Leo Tolstoy, Nikolai Berdyaev and Dmitry Merezhkovsky.

== Notable works ==
- Mesjaniści i słowianofile (1888)
- Byron i jego wiek (vol. 1–2, 1894–1897)
- Pestis perniciosissima (1905)
- Wizja Krasińskiego (1912)
- U opoki mesjanizmu (1912)
- Pesymizm, romantyzm a podstawy chrześcijaństwa (1914)
- Zygmunt Miłkowski a idea słowiańska w Polsce (1915)
- Gloryfikacja pracy (1916)
- Wpływy rosyjskie na duszę polską (1920)
- Renesans a rewolucja (1925)
- Walka o duszę młodzieży (1927)
- "O okrucieństwie"
- Niemcy. Szkic psychologiczny (1935)
- Węgry i Polska na przełomie historii (1937)
- Terror intelektualny w Rosji (1937)
- W obliczu końca (1937)
- Widmo przyszłości (1939) – published posthumously
