= Society of Friends of Science =

Society of Friends of Science (Polish: Towarzystwo Przyjaciół Nauk, TPN) can refer to:

- Society of Friends of Science in Przemyśl
- Society of Friends of Science in Silesia
- Society of Friends of Science in Warsaw
- Society of Friends of Science in Wilno (Vilno)
