= Rakaw =

Agrotown in Minsk Region, Belarus

Rakaw Ракаў (Belarusian)
- Agrotown
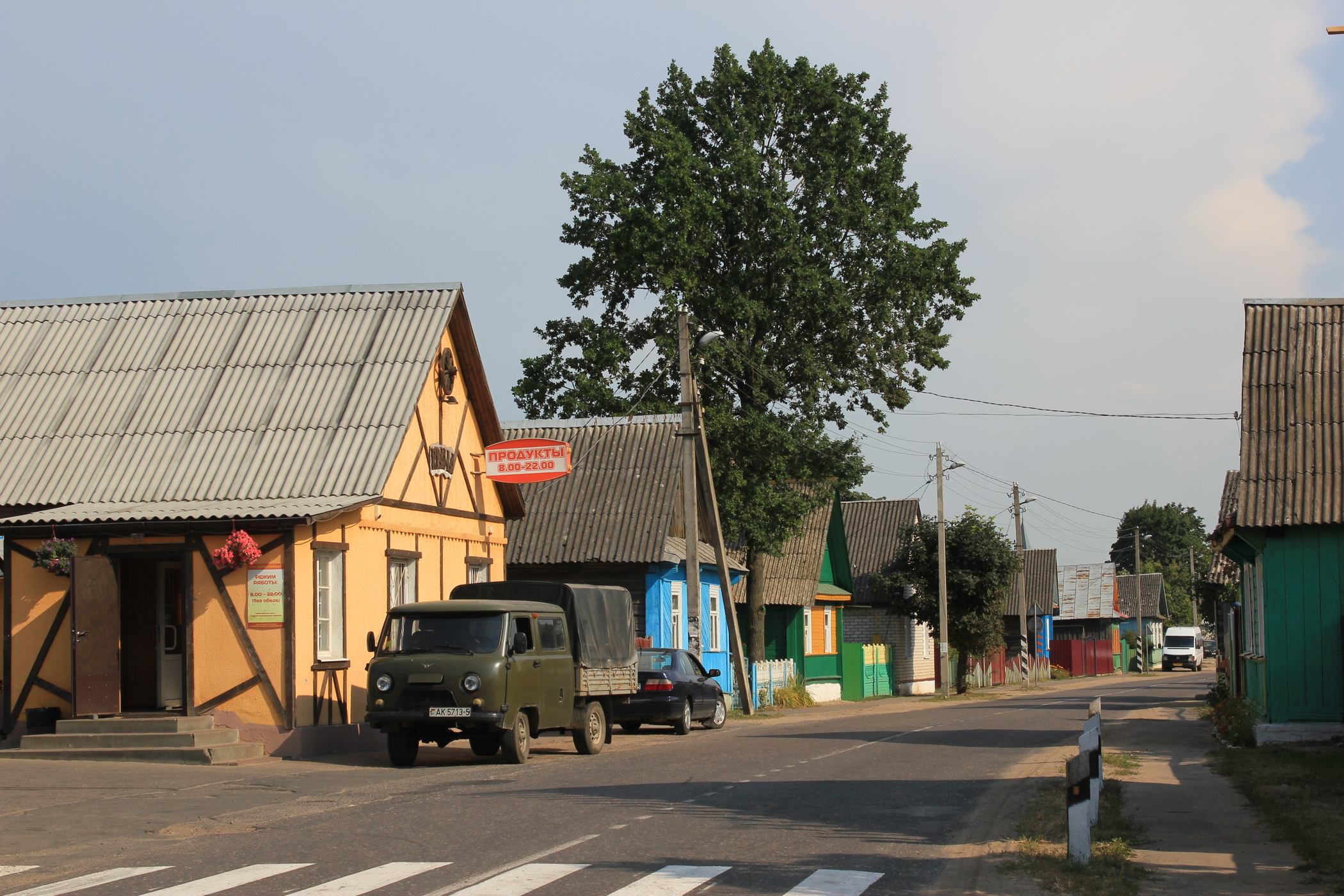

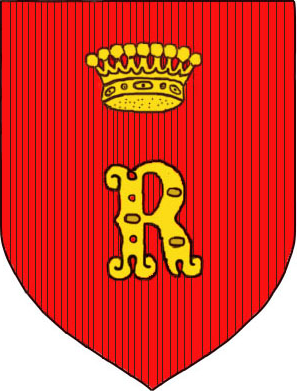
- Coat of arms

- Location within Belarus
- Coordinates: 53°58′02″N 27°03′10″E
- Country: Belarus
- Region: Minsk Region
- District: Valozhyn District

Population (2001)
  - Total: 2,106
- Time zone: UTC+3 (MSK)

Rakaw or Rakov (Note: Belarusian: Ракаў, romanized: Rakaŭ; Russian: Раков, romanized: Rakov; Polish: Raków, Yiddish: ראקאוויי, romanized: Rakavy, Lithuanian: Rokai.) is an agrotown in Valozhyn District, Minsk Region, Belarus. It stands on the Islach River 40 km (25 mi) from Valozhyn and 39 km (24 mi) from Minsk, the capital of Belarus. In 2001, it had a population of 2,106.

== History ==
The area has been inhabited since ancient times, which was proven when the settlement known as Valy was found on the river Islach. In the 16th century, the ruins were used as a platform for feudal castle building. The Rakaw castle can be found on the map created by Tomasz Makowski in 1613. In 14th-century documents, settlements near-contemporary Rakaw are mentioned for the first time. Rakaw itself is mentioned in 15th-century chronicles. In 1465 Casimir Jagiellon gave Rakaw as a gift to the chancellor of the Grand Duchy of Lithuania, Mykolas Kęsgaila. In 1550, it passed to Jan Zawisza of Zadora coat of arms as a part of an inheritance. Raków was a private town, administratively located in the Mińsk Voivodeship of the Polish–Lithuanian Commonwealth. In the 17th century, it passed to the Sanguszko family. In 1686, noblewoman Konstancja Teodora Sanguszko founded a Dominican Catholic monastery, and in 1702 Kazimierz Sanguszko, voivode of Minsk, founded a Basilian Uniat monastery.

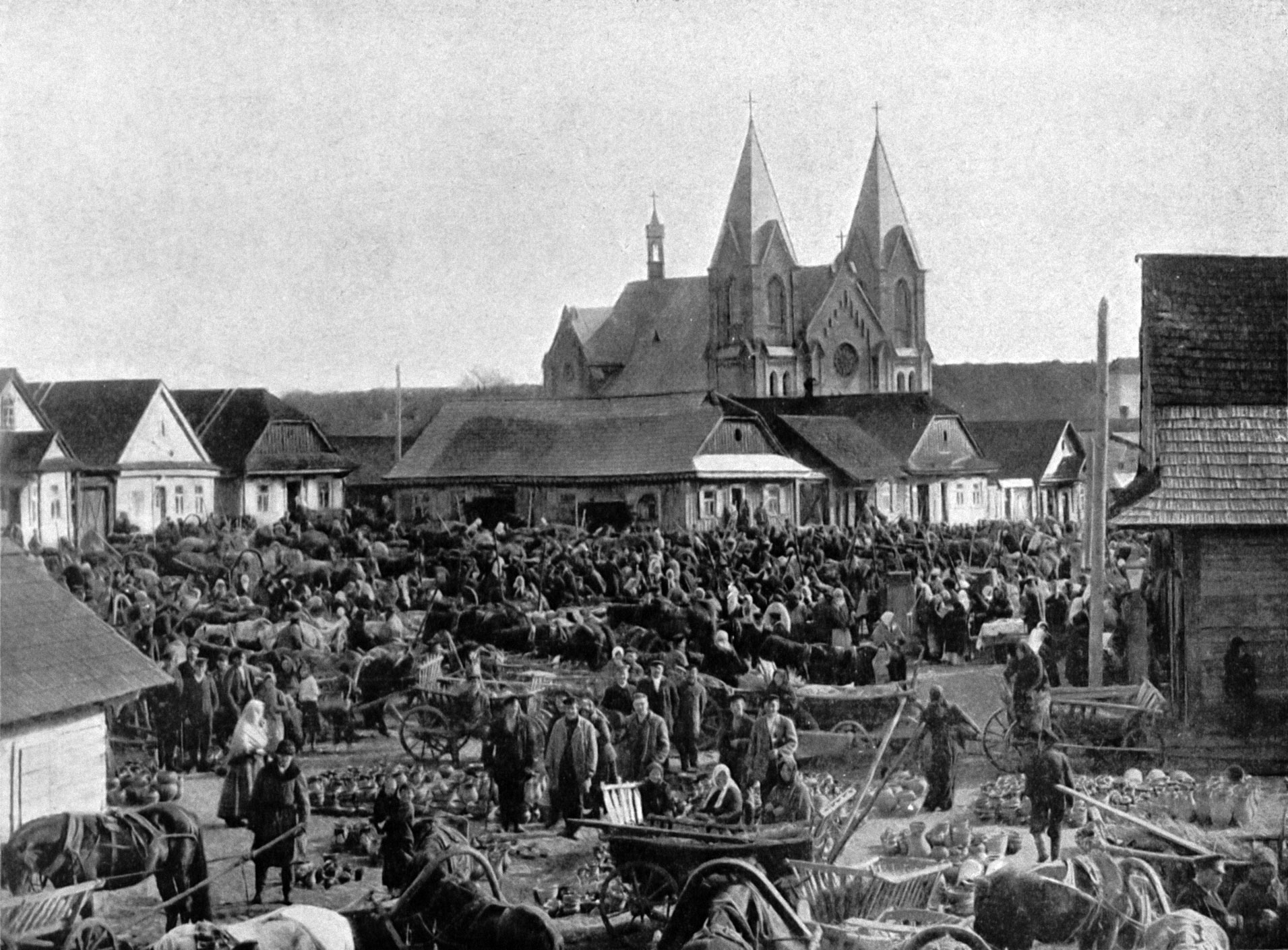
A local market in the early 20th century, Church of Saint Virgin Mary in the background

The town was annexed by the Russian Empire in the Second Partition of Poland in 1793. The first stone castle in the town was constructed. In 1794, Russian Empress Catherine the Great seized Rakaw from the Sanguszko family and gave it to General Saltykov, who, however, sold it to Wawrzyniec Zdziechowski in 1804. Following the unsuccessful Polish November Uprising, in the 1830s, the Dominican and Basilian monasteries were closed by the Tsarist authorities. After the unsuccessful Polish January Uprising, the stone castle was turned into an Orthodox church, which still exists to this day.

The Polish Zdziechowski family owned Rakaw until 1939. This period marked a time of prosperity for Rakaw: in 1843, they opened factories to produce agricultural machines. By 1880, about 16 glass factories operated in Rakaw. The village had Magdeburg rights and privileges. There were two watermills, a brick factory, a lumber mill, and a postal telegraph office (its ruins still remain). By the end of the 19th century, the population of Rakaw was about 3,600 people, almost 60% of whom were Jews. From 1904 to 1906, the construction of the Church of Saint Virgin Mary and the Holy Spirit Castle was finished. It was built with donations from the local people, and is an example of Neo-Gothic architecture. In 1915, the local citizen Nevah-Girsha Haimov Pozdnyakov organized automobile shipping between Rakaw and Zaslawye, a nearby town.

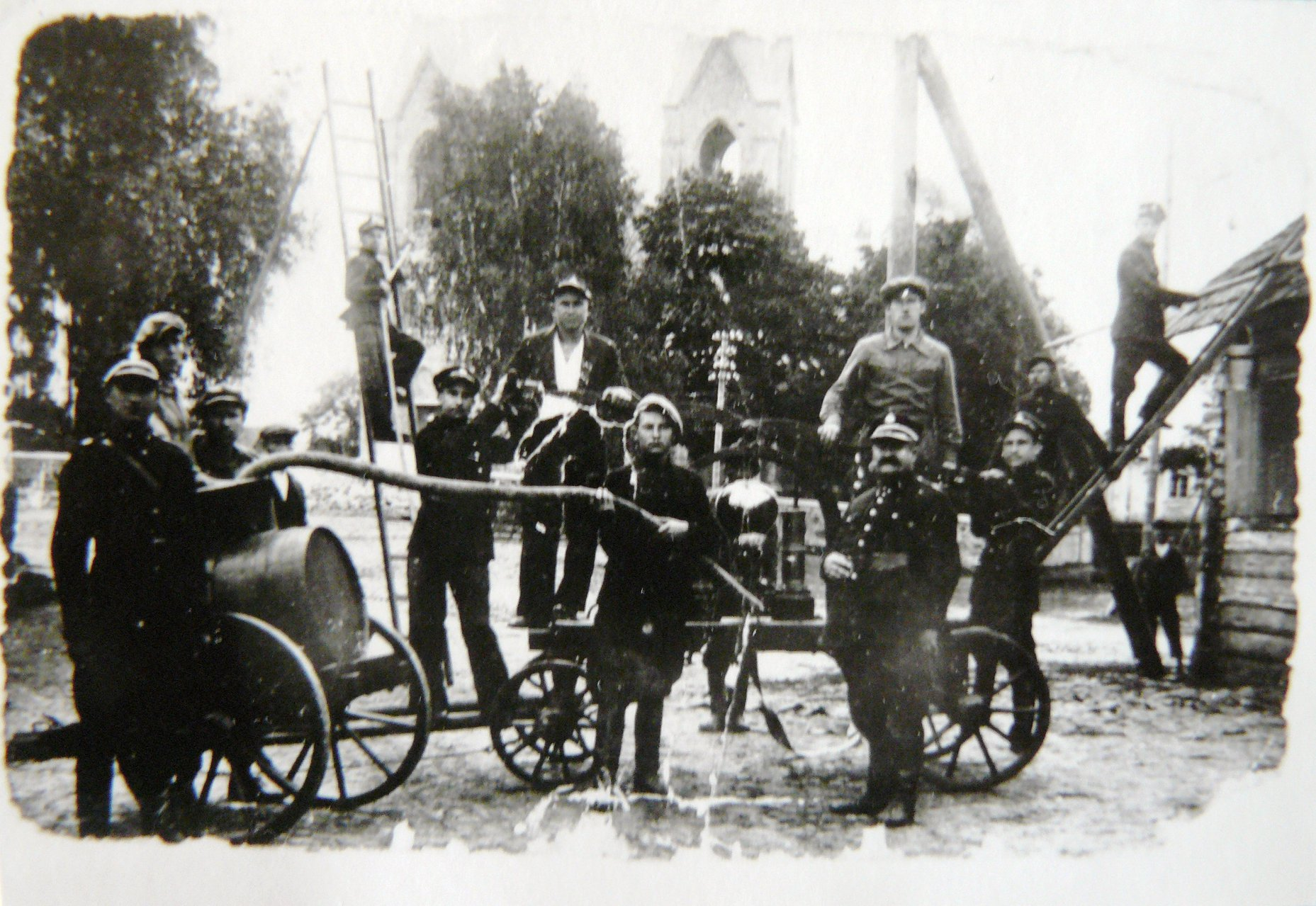
Fire department of Raków in the 1930s

During the Polish–Soviet War, it was recaptured by the Poles, and with the Treaty of Riga of 1921 confirmed it as part of the reborn Second Polish Republic. Administratively, Raków was located in the Stołpce County in the Nowogródek Voivodeship until 1927, and afterwards in the Mołodeczno County in the Wilno Voivodeship. In the 1921 census, 63.7% people declared Polish nationality, 31.9% declared Jewish nationality, and 4.2% declared Belarusian nationality.

During the joint German-Soviet invasion of Poland at the start of World War II, launched in accordance to the Molotov–Ribbentrop Pact, on 17 September 1939, it was the site of fierce Polish defense against the much more numerous Soviet invaders. Afterwards the town was plundered by the Soviets, and local intelligentsia and wealthy residents were persecuted. Princess Drucka-Lubecka, wife of Polish colonel Konstanty Drucki-Lubecki, who himself was murdered in the Katyn massacre, took refuge in the town, and was aided by the local population. Under Soviet occupation it was included within the Byelorussian Soviet Socialist Republic. From 1941, it was occupied by Nazi Germany. The Germans imposed a ban on the Polish language. On 21 August 1941, a ghetto was established in Rakaw. The ghetto lasted until 4 February 1942, when its population was herded into one of the ghetto's four synagogues and burned to death. The Polish resistance movement was active, including the Związek Młodych Orląt organization and the Home Army. Local Polish youth later also fought against Germany in the Naliboki forest, Kampinos Forest and Kielce region. In 1944, the town was re-occupied by the Soviet Union, and eventually annexed from Poland in 1945.

== Attractions ==
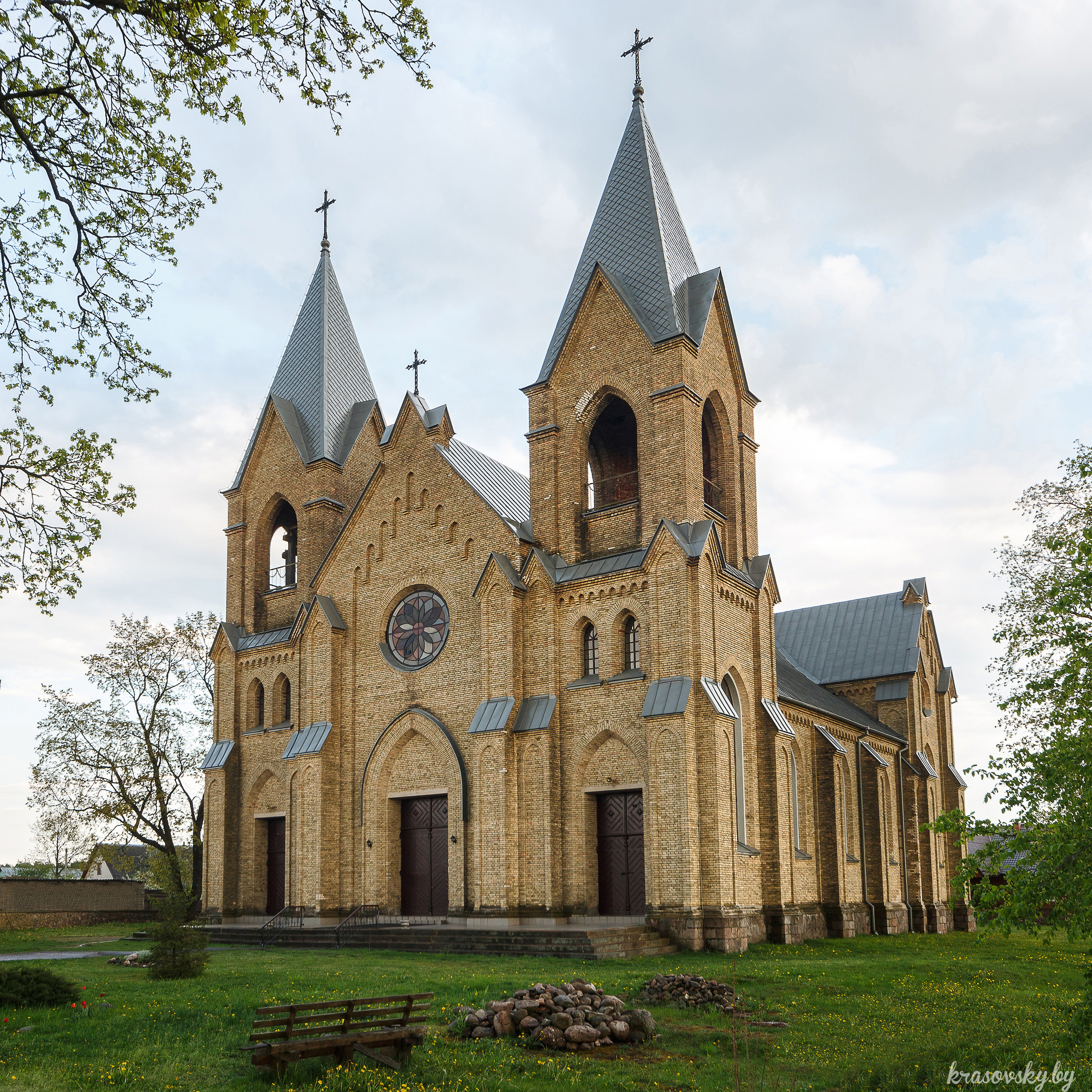
Church of Saint Virgin Mary

- Glacial conglomerate near the Minsk–Volozhin highway
- Ancient settlement
- Jewish cemetery (1642)
- Our Saviour and Transfiguration Church (1793)
- Catholic St. Ann Chapel (1862)
- Orthodox cemetery (19th century)
- Church of Saint Virgin Mary (1904–1906)
- Crypt and burial vault of Drucka-Lubecka
- Felix Yanushkevich Ethnographic museum

== Notable people ==
- Kazimierz Zdziechowski (1878–1942), Polish writer and publicist, murdered in the Auschwitz concentration camp
- Ida Rosenthal (1886–1973), Russian Empire-born American dressmaker and businesswoman who co-founded Maidenform
- Avraham Kalmanowitz (1887–1964), Rav of Rakov
