= Church of Saint Virgin Mary, Rakaw =

Church of Saint Virgin Mary
- Касцёл Найсвяцейшай Дзевы Марыі Ружанцавай
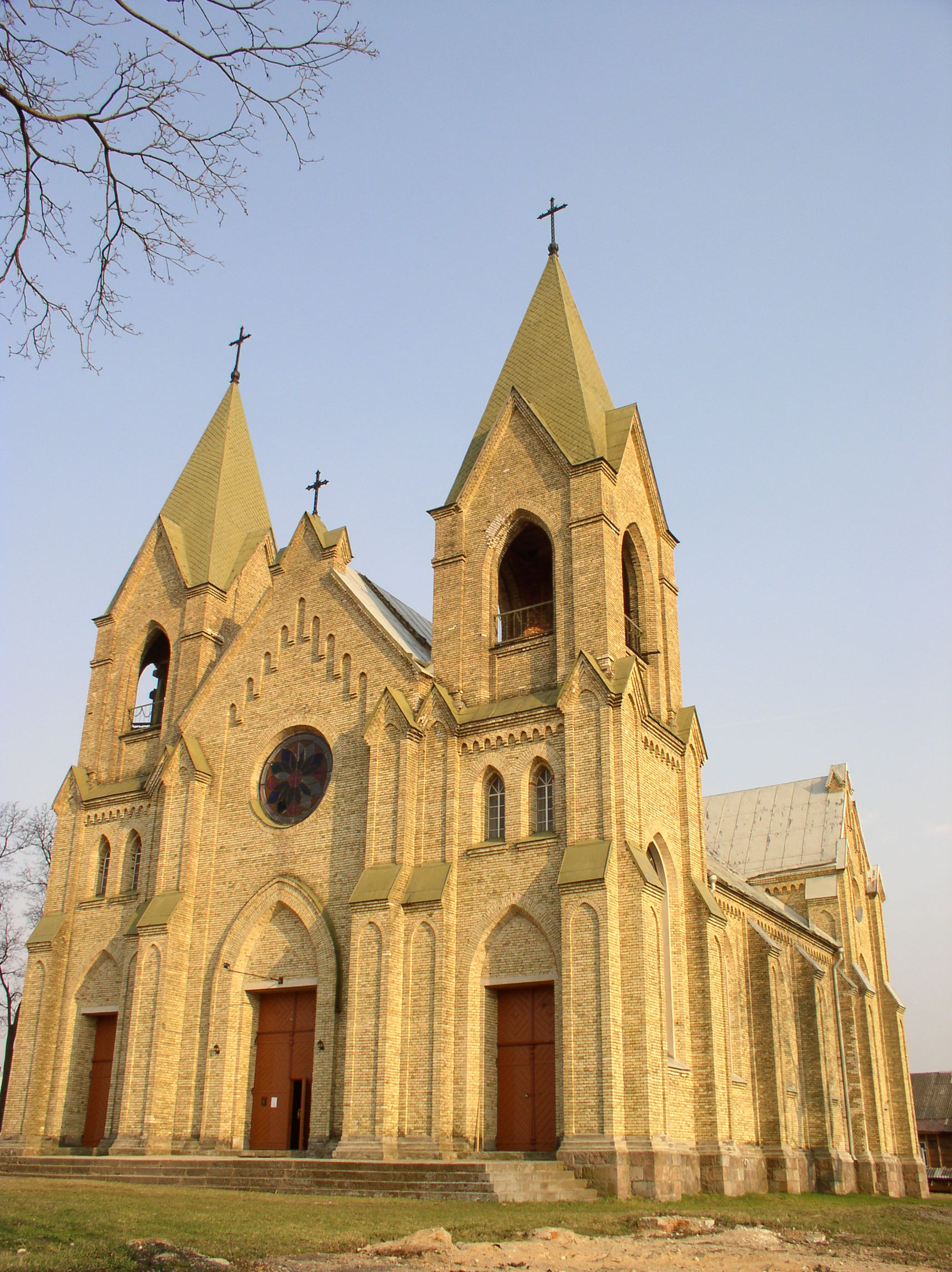
- Church of Saint Virgin Mary
- 53.9656°N 27.0559°E
- Location: Rakaw
- Country: Belarus
- Denomination: Roman Catholic

Architecture
- Style: Gothic Revival architecture
- Years built: 1904—1906

Administration
- Diocese: Roman Catholic Archdiocese of Minsk–Mohilev

The Church of Saint Virgin Mary in Rakaw is a Catholic church in Minsk Region, Belarus. It was constructed between 1904 and 1906 on the bank of the Islach river and consecrated in the name of Our Lady of the Rosary. The church is listed as a Belarusian Cultural Heritage object.

The Catholic parish in Rakaw was established in 1676, and the first wooden church was built then. In ten years it became a part of the Dominican monastery. The church was destroyed by fire in 1712 and 1812, but restored both times. In 1835 the monastery was closed and the church became a parish.

Between 1904 and 1906 the current Neo-Gothic stone church was constructed on the site of the former wooden one. The new church was made of yellow bricks and decorated with counterforts, peaked windows and arches, and a rose window in the main facade.

== Gallery ==
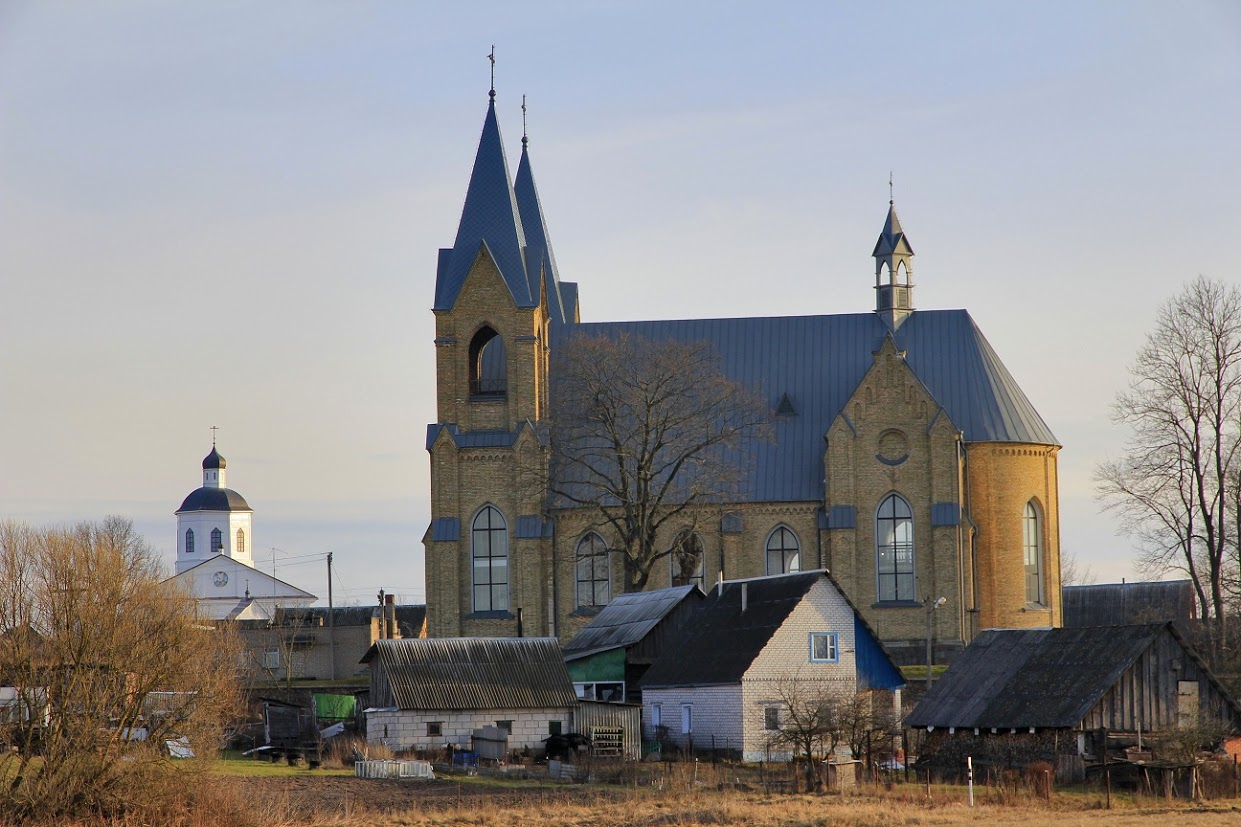
The church in 2016

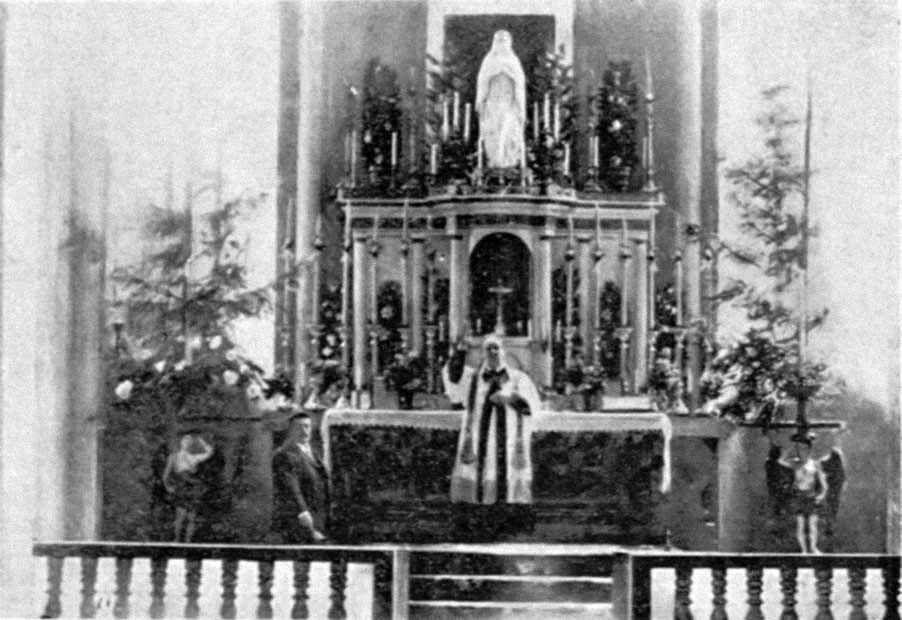
Main altar in 1914

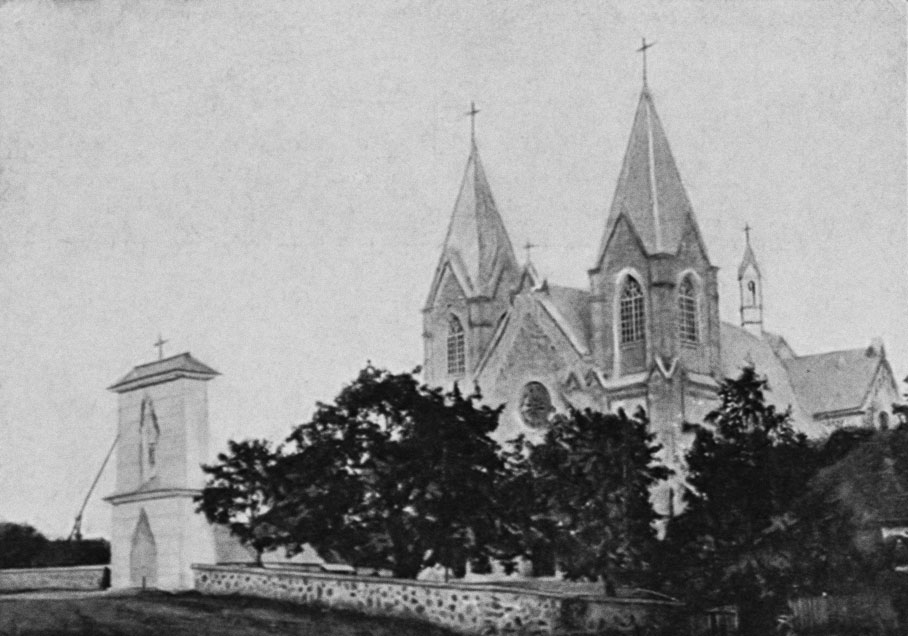
The church in 1914

== Sources ==
- Kulagin, A. M. (1993). Архітэктура Беларусі. Энцыклапедычны даведнік» [Belarusian Architecture: Encyclopedia]. Minsk: «Беларуская Энцыклапедыя імя Петруся Броўкі». p. 413. ISBN 5-85700-078-5.
