= Rakaw rural council =

Rakaw rural council (Belarusian: Ракаўскі сельсавет; Russian: Раковский сельсовет) is a lower-level subdivision (selsoviet) of Valozhyn district, Minsk region, Belarus. Its administrative center is Rakaw.
