= Brezina =

Brezina may refer to:

== Places ==
- Brezina, Slovakia, a village in Trebišov district
- Brezina, Brežice, a former settlement in the Municipality of Brežice, Slovenia
- Brézina, a municipality or commune in El Bayadh province, Algeria

== People ==
- Březina (surname), a Czech surname
- Aristides Brezina (1848–1909), Austrian mineralogist and meteoriticist
- Greg Brezina (born 1946), American football player
- Thomas Brezina (born 1963), Austrian author

== See also ==
- Březina (disambiguation)
- Berezina (disambiguation)
- Brezine
