= Kazimierz Zdziechowski =

Polish writer

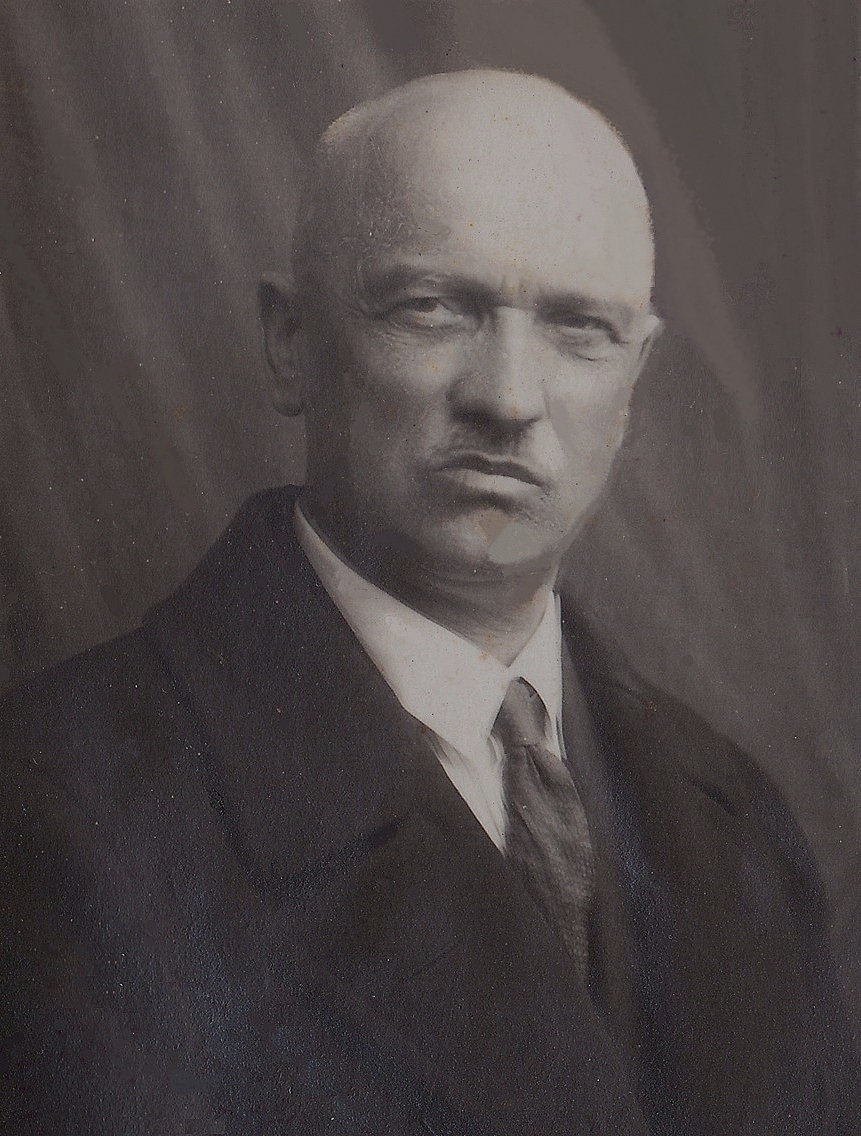
- Portrait of Zdziechowski, 1934
- Born: March 14, 1878; Rakov, Minsky Uyezd, Minsk Governorate, Russian Empire
- Died: August 4, 1942 (aged 64); Auschwitz, Gau Upper Silesia, German Reich
- Education: Imperial Moscow University
- Relatives: Marian Zdziechowski
- Writing career
- Pen name: Władysław Zdora; Władysław Mouner
- Language: Polish

Kazimierz Zdziechowski, also known under pseudonyms Władysław Zdora, Władysław Mouner, (March 14, 1878 – August 4, 1942) was a Polish landowner, prose writer, publicist, literary critic and novelist. Brother of Marian Zdziechowski, Polish philologist and philosopher.

== Biography ==
Zdziechowski was born on 14 March 1878 in Raków (present-day Belarus). He graduated in law from the Imperial Moscow University. He then managed the family estate in Raków. From 1896, he collaborated with the press as a prose writer, publicist and literary critic. Zdziechowski was murdered on 4 August 1942 during the Second World War in the Nazi concentration camp of Auschwitz.

== Works ==
- Fuimus (1900) – socio-psychological novel
- Przemiany, vol. 1–2 (1906)
- Łuna, vol. 1–2 (1910)
- Opoka (1912)
- Kresy (1920)
