= Minsk County =

Minsk County may refer to

- Mińsk County
- Minsk County (Minsk Governorate)
