= Rakaw Ghetto =

Nazi ghetto in occupied Belarus

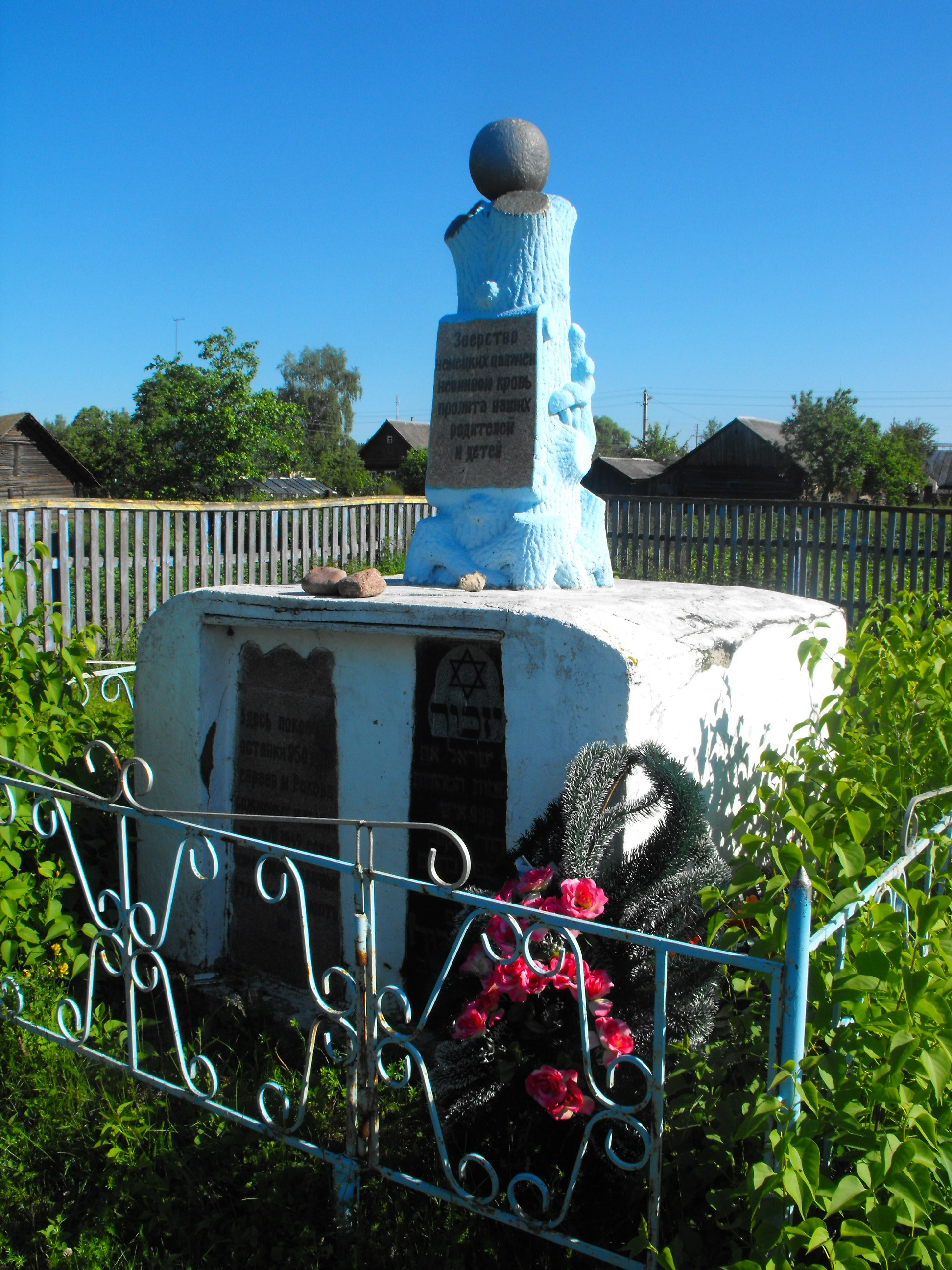
- Monument to the victims of the Rakaw Ghetto
- Location: Rakaw, Reichskommissariat Ostland; 53°58′06″N 27°03′35″E
- Date: 21 August 1941–4 February 1942
- Incident type: Imprisonment, mass shootings, forced labour, arson
- Participants: Wehrmacht; Byelorussian Auxiliary Police
- Victims: 1,050

The Rakaw Ghetto was established on 21 August 1941 in Rakaw, in the Byelorussian SSR of the Soviet Union (now Belarus), soon after the city's capture by Nazi Germany during Operation Barbarossa. An estimated 1,050 Jews were killed in the ghetto between its creation on 21 August 1941 and its liquidation on 4 February 1942.

== History ==
Prior to Operation Barbarossa, an estimated 928 Jews lived in the city of Rakaw, now in Minsk Region of Belarus. In June 1941, Wehrmacht soldiers occupied the city, and it was liberated on 4 July 1944.

On the first day of the occupation of Rakaw, a regiment of the Byelorussian Auxiliary Police was organised in the city. Immediately, a campaign of unrestrained looting of Jewish property began. Violent repressions soon followed; on 14 August 1941, 45 Jews from Rakaw were taken 2 km (1 mi) from the city and forced to dig a hole, in which they were then laid down and shot to death. On 21 August, 14 Jews travelling from Minsk to Rakaw were detained and killed. The latter city was immediately ghettoised.

Yasinsky, a farmer located nearby, was appointed commander of the Rakaw Auxiliary Police in September, and his assistant was a local citizen named Survillo. Jewish property was plundered frequently; the Auxiliary Police often demanded personal possessions, such as shoes and clothing, from the ghetto's inhabitants, and, after Rakaw was liberated, furniture, dishes, and personal belongings of the Jews were found by the Red Army. Gebietskommissar of Vileyka, Handel, forced ghetto inhabitants to collect and burn Sifrei Torah from the city's local synagogues, while Jewish girls were forced to dance and sing Hatikvah.

== Liquidation ==
The Germans, perhaps fearing a resistance movement akin to the nearby Minsk Ghetto, quickly moved to exterminate the population of the ghetto. On Rosh Hashanah of 1941 (29 September 1941), 105–112 men in the ghetto between the ages of 16 and 50 were executed.

On 4 February 1942, the Auxiliary Police, led by commander Nikolay Zenkyevich, herded the ghetto's remaining population into the "Cold Synagogue", one of four synagogues in Rakaw. Here, they were stripped of their valuables, undressed, and beaten by police. Afterwards, the synagogue was doused in gasoline and burned down as the police threw grenades into the building. 920–950 Jews were burned to death.

== Legacy ==
In 1955, a sign commemorating the victims of the Rakaw Ghetto was erected on the site of the "Cold Synagogue", in the form of a chopped tree. In July 2005, another monument, in the Jewish Cemetery of Rakaw, was erected; a stone saying in Belarusian, Hebrew, and English, "Here, in the autumn of 1941, 112 Jews from the village of Rakaw were brutally tortured. This place of massacre was discovered by the Commission to Perpetuate the Memory of the Victims of the Holocaust, established by the leaders of the Jewish communities and organizations of Belarus."
