= Ida Rosenthal =

Belarusian-born American dressmaker and businesswoman (1886-1973)

- Born: Ida Kaganovich; January 9, 1886; Rakaŭ, Russian Empire (now Belarus)
- Died: March 29, 1973 (aged 87)
- Known for: Businesswoman, dressmaker and inventor of the modern brassiere, She is the co-founder of Maidenform.
- Spouse: William Rosenthal
- Children: Beatrice Rosenthal Coleman and Lewis Rosenthal

Ida Rosenthal (née Kaganovich; January 9, 1886 – March 29, 1973) was a Belarusian-born American dressmaker and businesswoman who co-founded Maidenform. Ida is considered to be the creator of the modern bra and her company Maidenform went on to become the most successful bra manufacturer in the world.

== Biography ==
She was born to a Jewish family in Rakaŭ, near Minsk, then part of the Russian Empire. her father was a Hebrew scholar and her mother ran a small general store.

At the age of 18, she emigrated to the United States to Hoboken, New Jersey, following her fiancé William Rosenthal. She Americanized her (maiden) name to Cohen. Those who knew her well called her Itel. In 1907 she got married and partnershipped with her husband.

In 1921, along with Enid Bisset, she opened up a dress shop, which a year later was registered the name Maiden Form. In 1925 the first Maidenform plant was opened in Bayonne, New Jersey to focus solely on their most popular product, brassieres (although the company later produced lingerie and swimwear as well). Despite the Great Depression and Enid's retirement, the partnership was very successful and expanded into markets across the United States, Europe and Latin America. By 1938, the company grossed annual earnings of over 4.5 million dollars. The company's fame was propelled by an advertisement in the late 1940s which portrayed fashionable women participating in various activities wearing only a Maidenform bra above their waists.

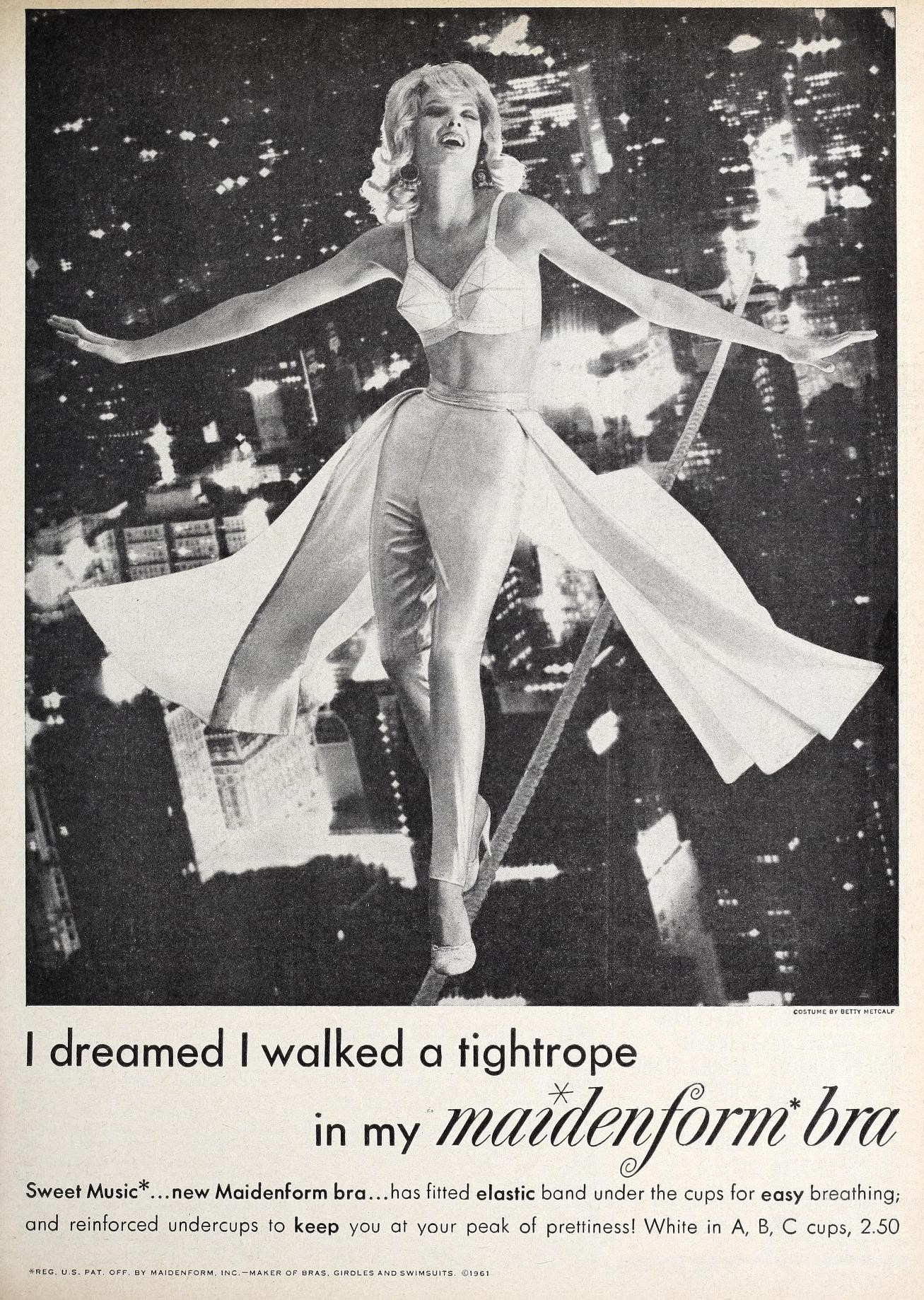
Advertisement used to promote Maidenform bras in 1961.

The Maidenform bra originated as an accessory to improve the fit of the dresses they sold, but it became so popular that they began to sell it separately. Their product was a major improvement over previous bras, because they used cups that supported and conformed to the breasts, rather than flattening them as had been the Flapper style (known as the "Boyish Form").

Ida was considered the genius behind the marketing and management of this company, managing the company's finances, manufacturing, and sales. Under Ida and her husband's leadership, Maidenform made many other advancements. Maidenform was the first company to sell maternity bras, and William invented a standard for cup sizes. In 1942, Ida received a patent for an adjustable fastener. During this time, Maidenform was also known for its racy newspaper ads featuring underwear models and its advertising slogan "I dreamed... in a Maidenform Bra."

During World War II her company Maidenform designed and produced vest for homing pigeons. These vest allowed paratroopers to carry birds with them when they parachuted behind enemy lines.

After William's death in 1958, Ida became the company president. Ida died in 1973 of pneumonia, leaving the company in control of her son-in-law Dr. Joseph Coleman. Upon Coleman's death in 1968, Ida's daughter Beatrice Rosenthal Coleman gained control over the company.

Today Maidenform is owned by Hanesbrands and is currently being run by Ida's Granddaughter, Elizabeth Coleman.

== Jewish Causes ==
Ida did a lot more during her life including numerous charitable organizations which she supported or founded later in her life. A few Jewish Causes she and her husband became involved in included Anti-Defamation League of B'nai B'rith and the United Jewish Appeal. The United Jewish Appeal focused on providing to relief to Jewish Europeans during and following WWII.

In 1942, Ida and William presented Solomon Rosenthal's collection of Hebrew books to New York University. This went on to become the William and Ida Rosenthal Collection. Ten years later a foundation in honor of Ida made sure a librarian would be paid to care for the collection. During this period they also established the Ida and William Rosenthal Fellowship in Judaica and Hebraic at New York University.

The couple founded Camp Lewis in Rockaway, New Jersey in 1943 for the Boy Scouts of America, in memory of their son Lewis, who died in 1930 at the age of 23. The camp continued to operate has been sold as of 2025.
