= Ivona Březinová =

Czech writer (born 1964)

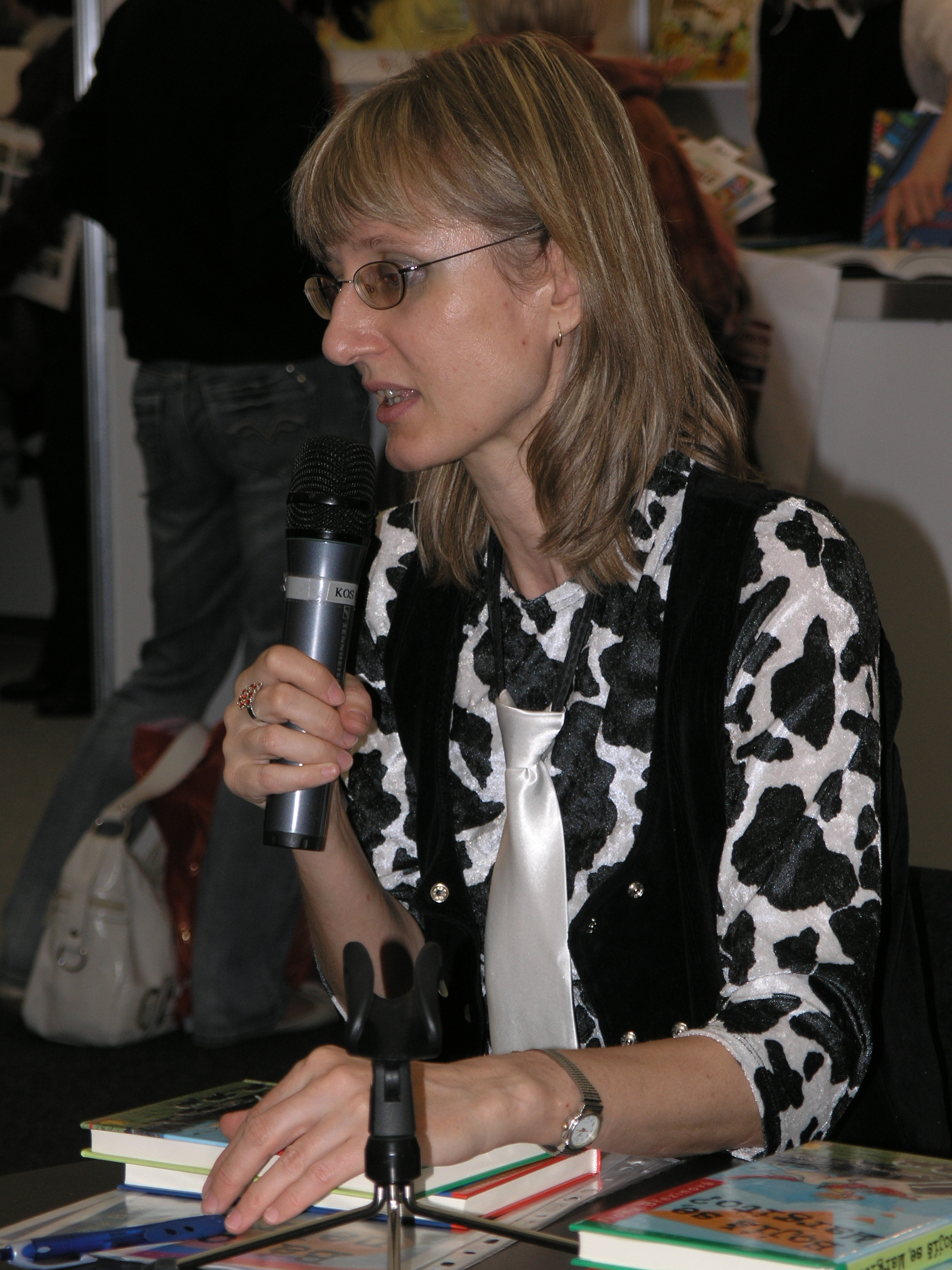
Ivona Březinová in 2009

Ivona Březinová (born 12 May 1964) is a Czech writer of fiction for children and adolescents.

== Biography ==
Březinová was born in Ústí nad Labem, North Bohemia, in 1964, where she attended gymnasium. She went on to study history and Czech language at the Faculty of Education at Jan Evangelista Purkyně University (now Masaryk University) in Brno. After graduating, she began working as an assistant in the university's Czech studies department. One year later, she gained a doctorate of educational science for Czech language and literature. She worked for a few more years as a professional assistant, focusing mainly on Czech literature of the 19th and early 20th century, publishing expert articles for newspapers during this time. Over time, she began to focus on literature for children and young people.

Březinová subsequently married and moved to Prague, taking a maternity break after the birth of her two daughters. She then started writing books for children and young people, publishing her first book, Zrcátko pro Markétu ("The mirror for Marketa") in 1996. Her work includes fiction for young people as well as for older readers and stories for radio. She has written more than 30 books.

Březinová leads courses of creative writing at a literature academy in Prague, and often attends talks and authors' readings across the Czech Republic and Slovakia. She also established the Besedník programme. She has been a member of IBBY since 1982 and a member of the Obec spisovatelů writers community since 1999. Since 2007 she has led the creative group Hlava nehlava, where she works as an editor of short story collections. Brezinová has received many national prizes.

Her books have been translated into English, German, French, Croatian, Polish, Russian, Slovak, Slovene, Serbian and Sorbian.

== Publications ==
Her break-through in 1996, The mirror for Marketa, was followed three years later by Lauro, ty jsi ale číslo! ("Laura, what a tomboy you are!"). A year later, in 2000, she wrote Lufťačky. One of her best known books is Jmenuji se Alice ("My name is Alice"), the first book of the Holky na vodítku ("Girls on a leash") trilogy, about girls with serious problems. The book was followed by Jmenuji se Ester ("My name is Ester") and Jmenuji se Martina ("My name is Martina"). Alice was addicted to drugs, Ester was a gambler, and Martina was chronically bulimic. Until this point, Březinová had written for children, but with these books she expanded into writing for teenagers. Other of her books include Báro, nebreč! ("Bara, do not cry!") and Básník v báglu ("Poet in a backpack"). Her book Saxana a lexikon kouzel ("Saxana and the lexicon of spells") is based on the film of the same name. In 2015 she returned to books for children, writing Chobotem sem, chobotem tam ("Thrunk here, thrunk there").
