= Březina (Jičín District) =

- Municipality
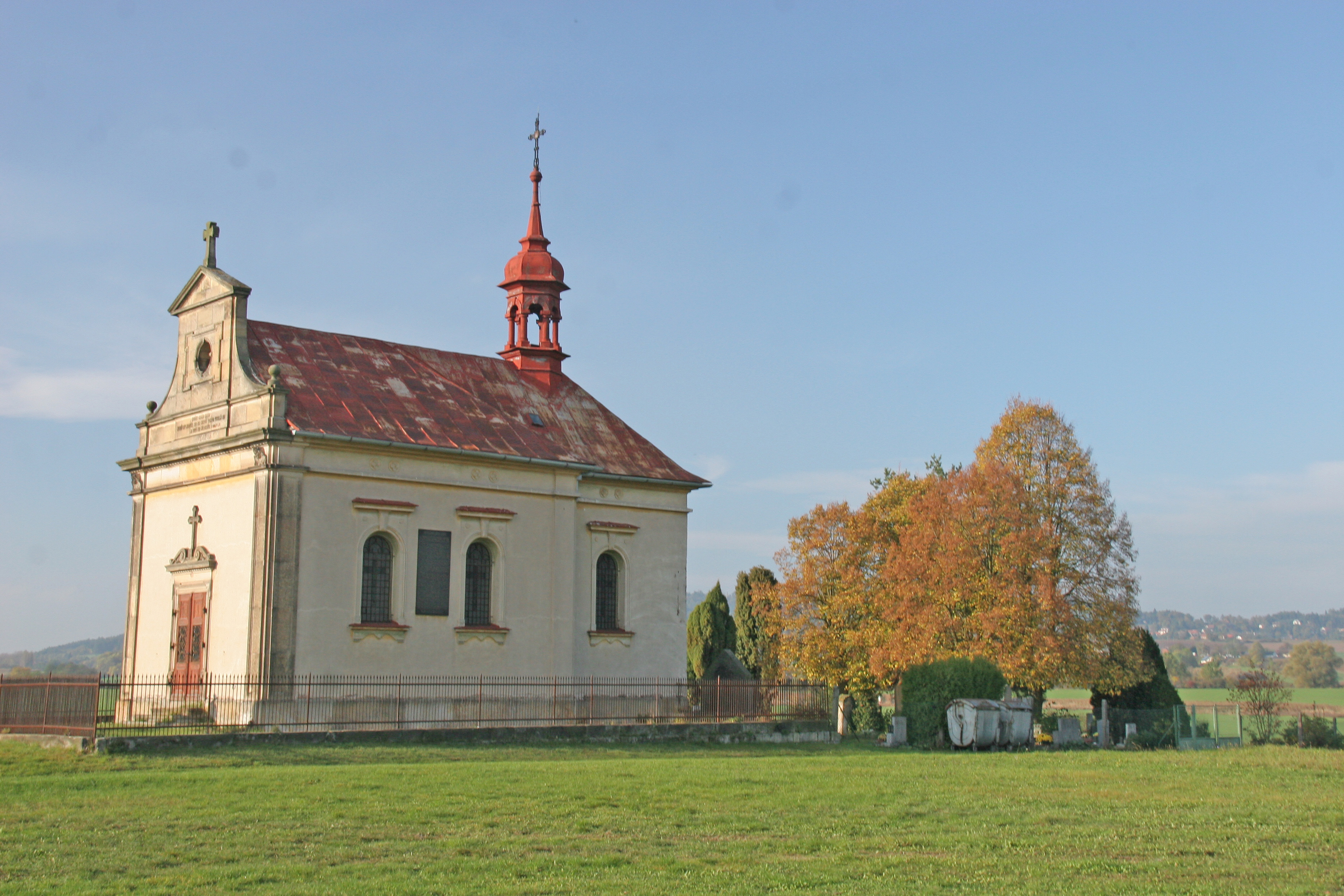
- Church of the Sacred Heart

- Location in the Czech Republic
- Coordinates: 50°26′4″N 15°18′48″E
- Country: Czech Republic
- Region: Hradec Králové
- District: Jičín
- First mentioned: 1393

Area
  - Total: 1.38 km^{2} (0.53 sq mi)
- Elevation: 262 m (860 ft)

Population (2026-01-01)
  - Total: 133
  - Density: 96.4/km^{2} (250/sq mi)
- Time zone: UTC+1 (CET)
  - Summer (DST): UTC+2 (CEST)
- Postal code: 506 01
- Website: www.brezina-obec.cz

Březina is a municipality and village in Jičín District in the Hradec Králové Region of the Czech Republic. It has about 100 inhabitants.

== Etymology ==
The name means 'birch forest' in Czech. The village was founded on the site of a cleared birch forest.

== Demographics ==
Historical population
Year	Pop.	±%
1869	135	—
1880	132	−2.2%
1890	129	−2.3%
1900	141	+9.3%
1910	154	+9.2%
1921	147	−4.5%
1930	158	+7.5%
1950	107	−32.3%
1961	112	+4.7%
1970	91	−18.8%
1980	67	−26.4%
1991	52	−22.4%
2001	52	+0.0%
2011	97	+86.5%
2021	131	+35.1%
Source: Censuses
