= Nové Sady (Vyškov District) =

- Municipality
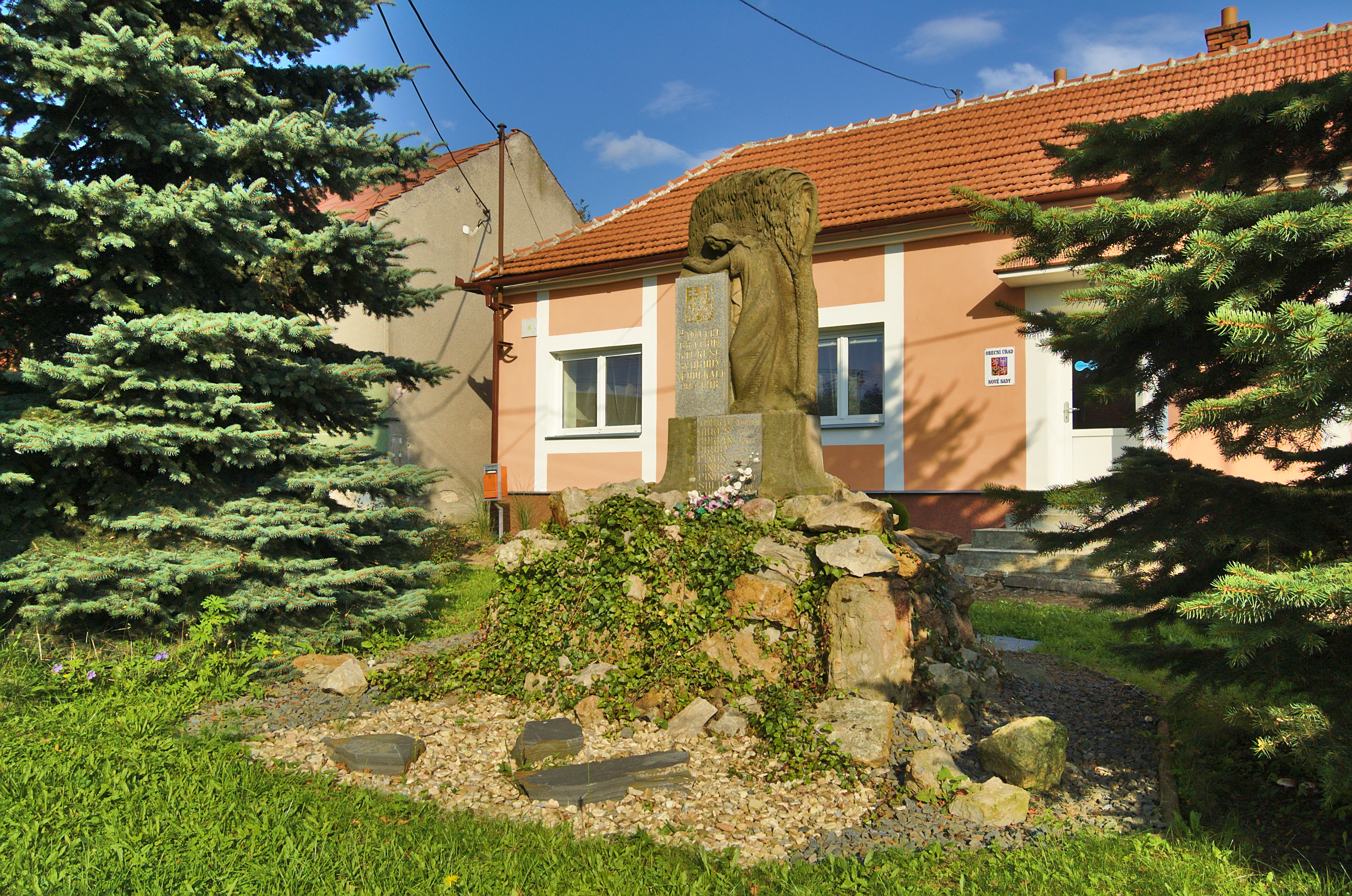
- Memorial to the victims of World War I and municipal office

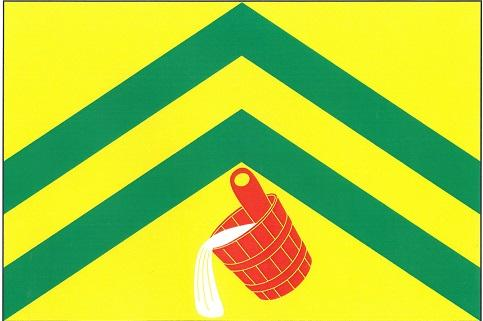
- Flag Coat of arms

- Location in the Czech Republic
- Coordinates: 49°24′32″N 16°54′7″E
- Country: Czech Republic
- Region: South Moravian
- District: Vyškov
- First mentioned: 1426

Area
  - Total: 2.44 km^{2} (0.94 sq mi)
- Elevation: 550 m (1,800 ft)

Population (2026-01-01)
  - Total: 105
  - Density: 43.0/km^{2} (111/sq mi)
- Time zone: UTC+1 (CET)
  - Summer (DST): UTC+2 (CEST)
- Postal code: 683 08
- Website: www.obecnovesady.cz

Nové Sady is a municipality and village in Vyškov District in the South Moravian Region of the Czech Republic. It has about 100 inhabitants.

Nové Sady lies approximately 17 kilometres (11 mi) north-west of Vyškov, 32 km (20 mi) north-east of Brno, and 194 km (121 mi) south-east of Prague.

== Administrative division ==
Nové Sady consists of two municipal parts (in brackets population according to the 2021 census):

- Nové Sady (57)
- Březina (43)

== Demographics ==
Historical population
Year	Pop.	±%
1869	356	—
1880	405	+13.8%
1890	441	+8.9%
1900	462	+4.8%
1910	492	+6.5%
1921	468	−4.9%
1930	416	−11.1%
1950	259	−37.7%
1961	284	+9.7%
1970	261	−8.1%
1980	199	−23.8%
1991	142	−28.6%
2001	117	−17.6%
2011	87	−25.6%
2021	100	+14.9%
Source: Censuses
