= Březina (Svitavy District) =

- Municipality
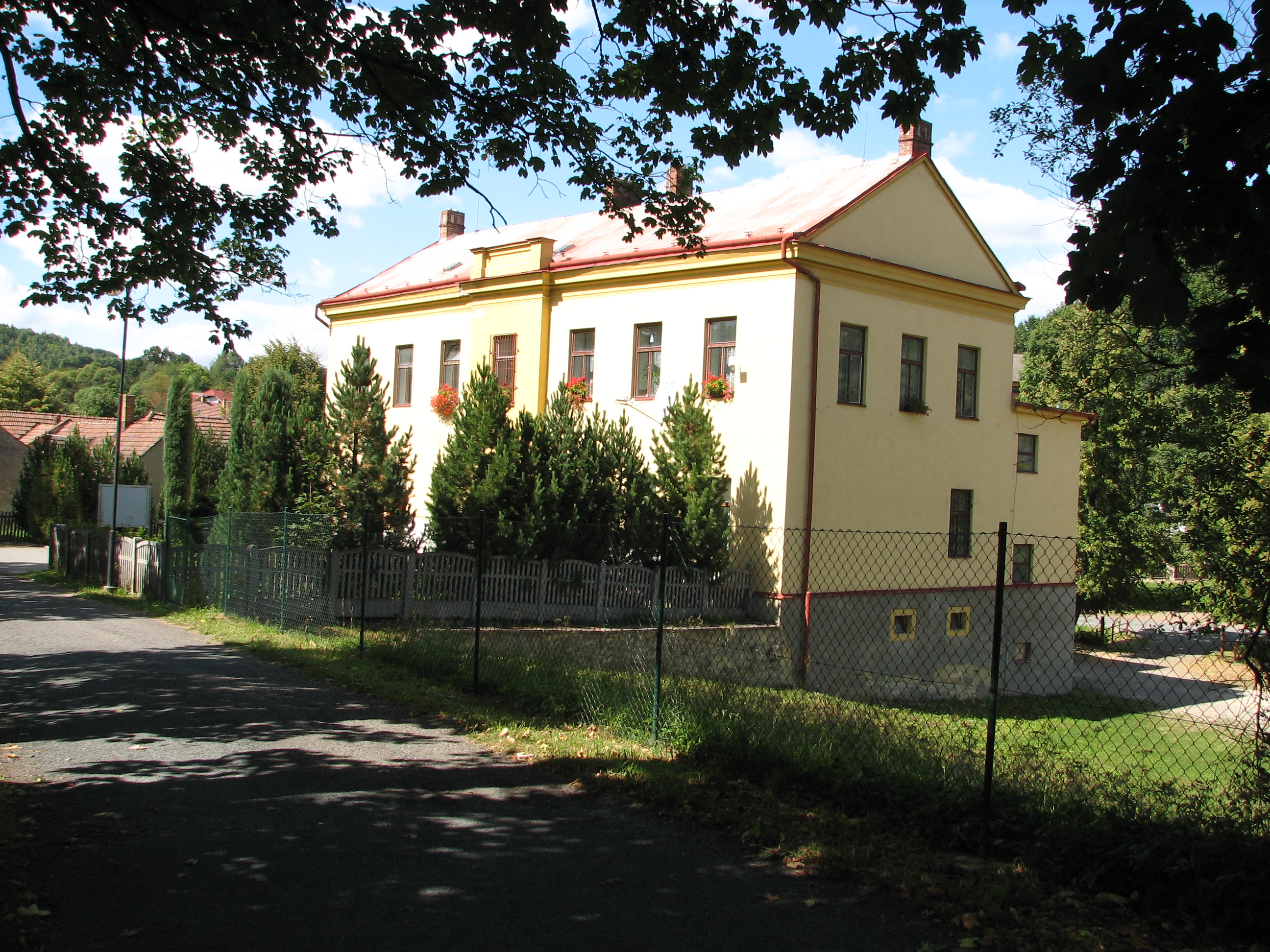
- Municipal office

- Flag Coat of arms

- Location in the Czech Republic
- Coordinates: 49°39′4″N 16°36′52″E
- Country: Czech Republic
- Region: Pardubice
- District: Svitavy
- First mentioned: 1365

Area
  - Total: 11.63 km^{2} (4.49 sq mi)
- Elevation: 420 m (1,380 ft)

Population (2026-01-01)
  - Total: 318
  - Density: 27.3/km^{2} (70.8/sq mi)
- Time zone: UTC+1 (CET)
  - Summer (DST): UTC+2 (CEST)
- Postal codes: 569 23, 569 43
- Website: www.obecbrezina.com

Březina is a municipality and village in Svitavy District in the Pardubice Region of the Czech Republic. It has about 300 inhabitants.

Březina lies approximately 16 kilometres (10 mi) south-east of Svitavy, 74 km (46 mi) south-east of Pardubice, and 165 km (103 mi) east of Prague.

== Administrative division ==
Březina consists of two municipal parts (in brackets population according to the 2021 census):

- Březina (260)
- Šnekov (42)

== Etymology ==
The name Březina means 'birch forest' in Czech. The village was founded on the site of a cleared birch forest.

== Demographics ==
Historical population
Year	Pop.	±%
1869	883	—
1880	908	+2.8%
1890	962	+5.9%
1900	884	−8.1%
1910	799	−9.6%
1921	765	−4.3%
1930	671	−12.3%
1950	416	−38.0%
1961	644	+54.8%
1970	588	−8.7%
1980	547	−7.0%
1991	425	−22.3%
2001	386	−9.2%
2011	357	−7.5%
2021	302	−15.4%
Source: Censuses
