= Russian replenishment ship Berezina =

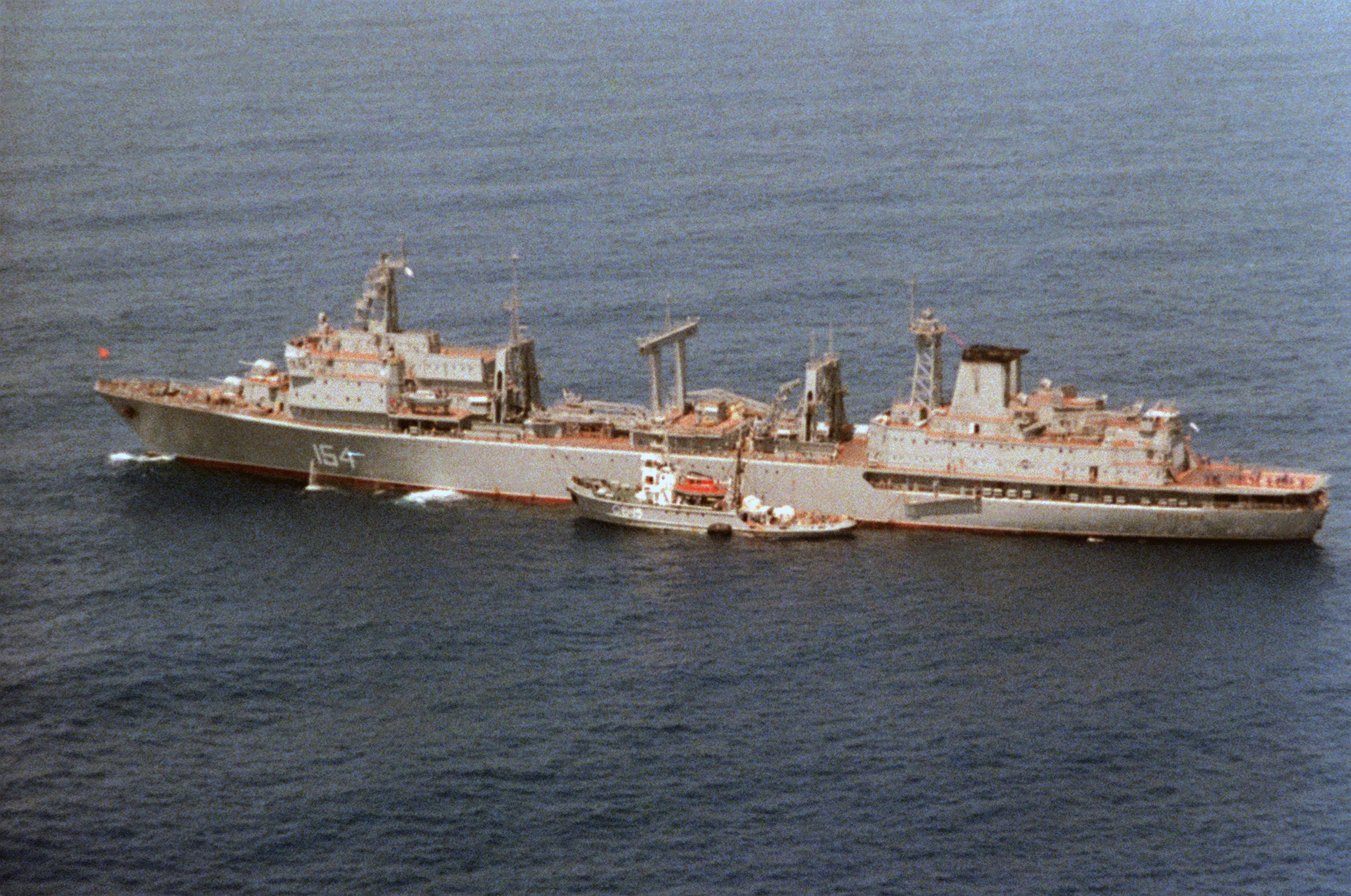
- The replenishment ship Berezina in 1988

History

Soviet Union → Ukraine/Russia
- Name: Berezina
- Namesake: Berezina River or the Battle of Berezina
- Operator: Soviet Navy (1977–1992); Joint Russo-Ukrainian Black Sea Fleet (1992–1997)
- Builder: Shipyard named after 61 Communards, Mykolaiv
- Laid down: August 18, 1972
- Launched: April 20, 1975
- Commissioned: December 30, 1977
- Decommissioned: May 28, 1997
- Reclassified: Ammunition ship, 1 December 1996
- Home port: Sevastopol Naval Base
- Fate: Joined the joint Russo-Ukrainian Black Sea Fleet, 3 August 1992; Transferred to the Russian Black Sea Fleet, 28 May 1997

Russia
- Name: Berezina
- Operator: Russian Navy
- Commissioned: May 28, 1997
- Decommissioned: March 2002
- Home port: Sevastopol Naval Base
- Fate: Sold for scrapping, 2002; Scrapped, 2003

General characteristics
- Class & type: Berezina-class replenishment ship
- Displacement: 25,000 tonnes (25,000 long tons; 28,000 short tons) full load
- Length: 209.84 m (688 ft 5 in)
- Beam: 25.1 m (82 ft 4 in)
- Draught: 7.7 m (25 ft 3 in)
- Installed power: 2 × 16,500-metric-horsepower (16,270 shp) T-1 COGAS systems; 2 × 1,500 kW auxiliary diesel generators
- Propulsion: COGAS; two shafts: 2 × 15,000-metric-horsepower (14,790 shp) M-24 gas turbines; 2 × 1,500-metric-horsepower (1,480 shp) PTU-1 steam turbines
- Speed: 21.87 knots (40.50 km/h; 25.17 mph)
- Range: 9,180 nmi (17,000 km; 10,560 mi) at 18 knots (33 km/h; 21 mph)
- Endurance: 90 days
- Complement: 389 crew + 178 passengers
- Sensors & processing systems: 1 × "Don" navigational radar; 2 × "Don-Kay" navigational radars; 1 × "Strut Curve" (MR-302) air search radar; 1 × "Pop Group" (4R33 / MPZ-301 "Baza") air search and fire-control radar (SA-N-4); 1 × "Muff Cob" (MR-103 "Bars") fire-control radar (57 mm); 2 × "Bass Tilt" (MR-123 "Vympel-A") fire-control radars (30 mm); 1 × PUSB "Storm-1833" hull-mounted sonar; 2 × "High Pole B" (IFF); 2 × "Square Head" (IFF)
- Electronic warfare & decoys: "Tertsiya-1833" jamming system (2 × ZIF-121 chaff launchers)
- Armament: 2 × twin 57 mm AK-725 dual-purpose guns; 4 × 30 mm AK-630 CIWS; 2 × sextuple 300 mm RBU-1000 "Smerch-1" ASW (84 × RGB-10 anti-submarine rockets); 1 × twin ZIF-122 launcher of SA-N-4 ("Osa-M") SAGW (20 × 9M33 missiles)
- Aircraft carried: 2 × Ka-25 Hormone C

Berezina (Russian: Березина) was a fleet replenishment ship used by the Soviet Navy and by the Russian Navy. She was only ship of Project 1833 Pegas (Russian: Пегас, lit. 'Pegasus'). The ship served in the Soviet Navy and later Russian Navy Black Sea Fleet from 1977 to 2002. Berezina was scrapped in Aliağa, Turkey in 2003.

== Construction ==
The ship was laid down on 18 August 1972 at the Shipyard named after 61 Communards, Mykolaiv, Ukrainian SSR, USSR. Launched 20 April 1975. On 30 December 1977, the ship was commissioned as part of the Black Sea Fleet of the Soviet Navy and was based in Sevastopol. Berezina was heavily armed for a supply ship of the era. Berezina was armed with the Osa-M surface-to-air guided weapon, 57 mm/75-caliber AK-725 automatic dual-purpose gun turrets, RBU-1000 anti-submarine weapons and AK-630 close-in weapon systems. Uniquely, in 1986 it was said that Berezina was probably the only auxiliary ship of any nation fitted with sonar and anti-submarine weapons. In 1979, western media reported that it was suspected that four Berezina-class supply ships would eventually be built. Only one was completed.

== Operations ==
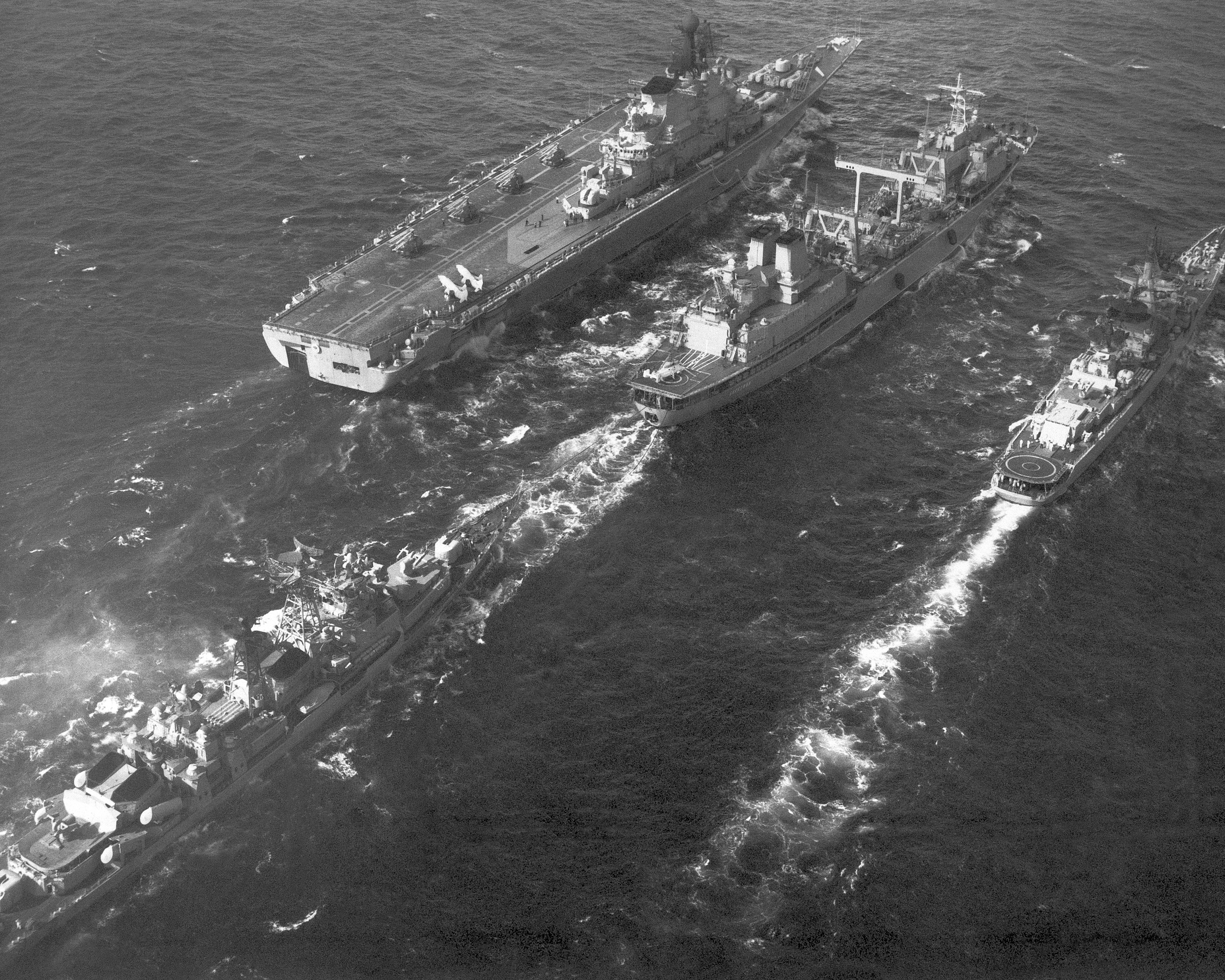
Aerial starboard quarter view of the Soviet replenishment oiler Berezina (center), simultaneously refueling the aircraft carrier Kiev (left), a Kresta II-class cruiser (right), and a Mod Kashin-class destroyer (behind), 1985

From 26 May to 28 September 1978, Berezina conducted comprehensive testing in the Black Sea with the carrier Minsk transferring stores via high line and with helicopters. Berezina was able to refuel ships port, starboard and astern. In 1979, Berezina operated in the Mediterranean Sea, transferring cargo and fuel to Tashkent, Minsk and Kiev. In 1980–1981, Berezina operated in the Indian Ocean. In 1982, Berezina operated with the Northern Fleet during a large exercise, transferring cargo to Kiev and Kirov.

In 1985, Berezina returned to the Shipyard named after 61 Communards for repairs and modernization. After shipyard work was completed, Berezina was sent to the Mediterranean Sea. On 14 May 1986, Berezina collided with the steamship Capitan Soroka in fog near Istanbul and was damaged on the port side, down to the waterline. After the collision, the ship returned to Mykolaiv for repairs until 1987. On 18 February 1991, Berezina deployed to the Mediterranean Sea for the final time, returning to Sevastopol on 30 August 1991. During the ship's career, Berezina deployed 9 times and travelled about 95,000 nautical miles (176,000 km). After the fall of the Soviet Union, Russian naval activity declined and Berezina was no longer needed for fleet operations and underway replenishment. In 1996, the ship's armaments were removed. She was sponsored by the city of Zelenograd (1995–1997). In March 2002, the ship was sold for scrapping. Berezina was scrapped at Aliağa, Turkey, 9 April 2003.

== See also ==
- Fast combat support ship
- Sacramento-class fast combat support ship
- Supply-class fast combat support ship
