= Vlastějovice =

- Municipality
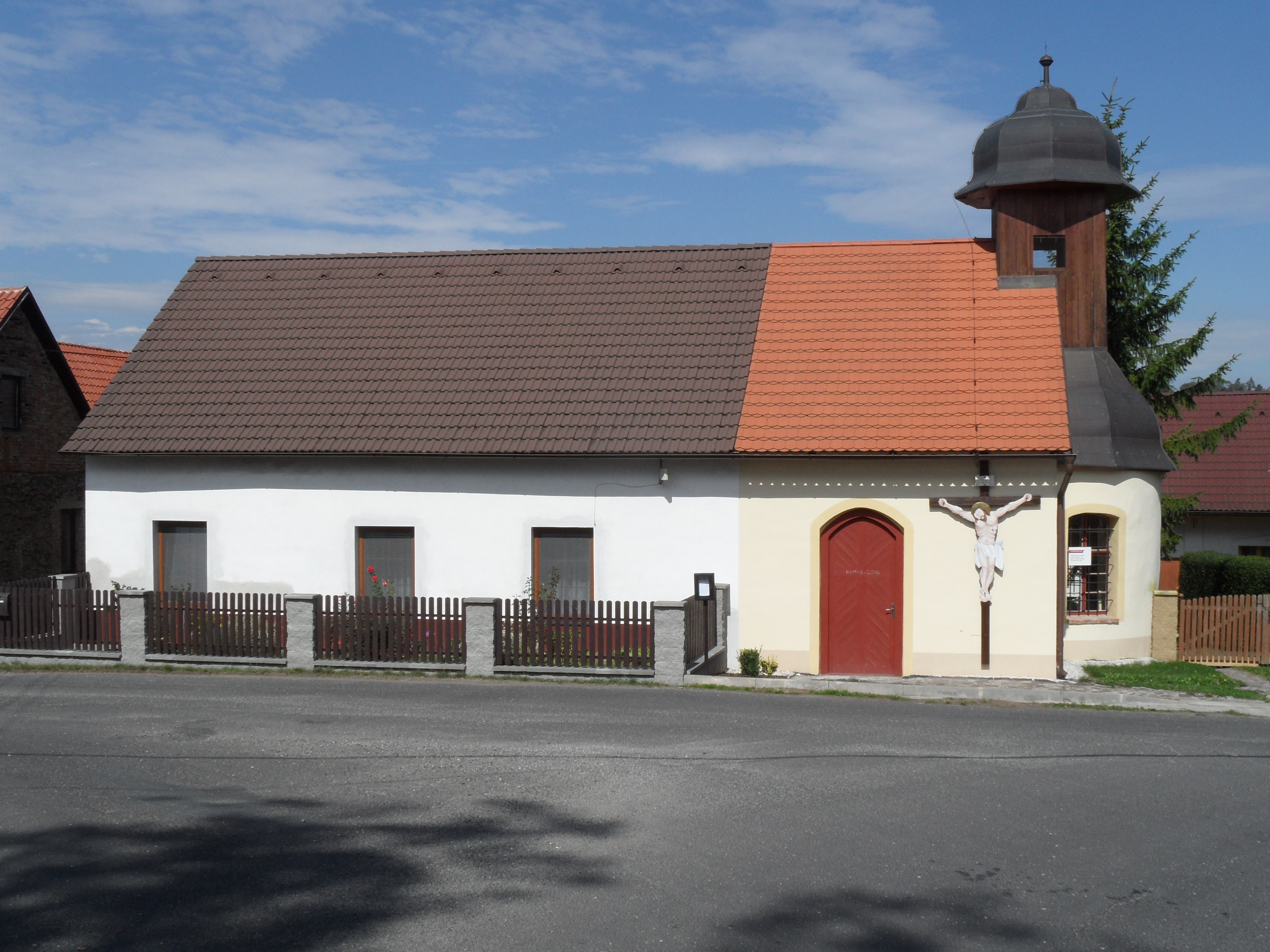
- House with a chapel

- Location in the Czech Republic
- Coordinates: 49°43′53″N 15°10′29″E
- Country: Czech Republic
- Region: Central Bohemian
- District: Kutná Hora
- First mentioned: 1305

Area
  - Total: 19.06 km^{2} (7.36 sq mi)
- Elevation: 354 m (1,161 ft)

Population (2026-01-01)
  - Total: 471
  - Density: 24.7/km^{2} (64.0/sq mi)
- Time zone: UTC+1 (CET)
  - Summer (DST): UTC+2 (CEST)
- Postal code: 285 23
- Website: www.vlastejovice.cz

Vlastějovice is a municipality and village in Kutná Hora District in the Central Bohemian Region of the Czech Republic. It has about 500 inhabitants.

== Administrative division ==
Vlastějovice consists of eight municipal parts (in brackets population according to the 2021 census):

- Vlastějovice (279)
- Březina (15)
- Budčice (35)
- Kounice (55)
- Milošovice (17)
- Pavlovice (34)
- Skala (5)
- Volavá Lhota (33)

== Demographics ==
Historical population
Year	Pop.	±%
1869	1,287	—
1880	1,286	−0.1%
1890	1,199	−6.8%
1900	1,152	−3.9%
1910	1,205	+4.6%
1921	1,143	−5.1%
1930	943	−17.5%
1950	806	−14.5%
1961	815	+1.1%
1970	739	−9.3%
1980	619	−16.2%
1991	533	−13.9%
2001	527	−1.1%
2011	455	−13.7%
2021	473	+4.0%
Source: Censuses
