= Březina (Mladá Boleslav District) =

- Municipality
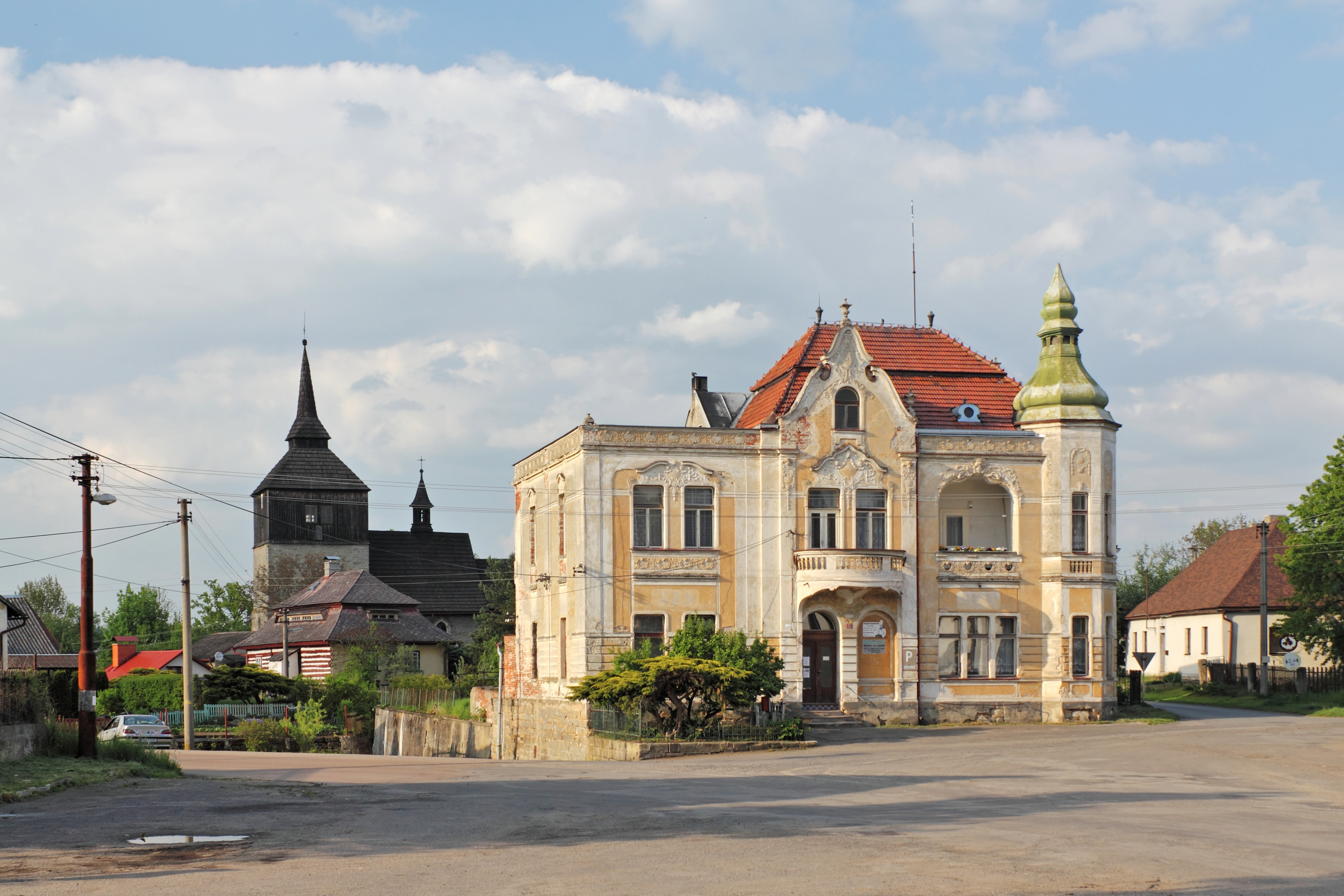
- Centre of Březina; church in the background

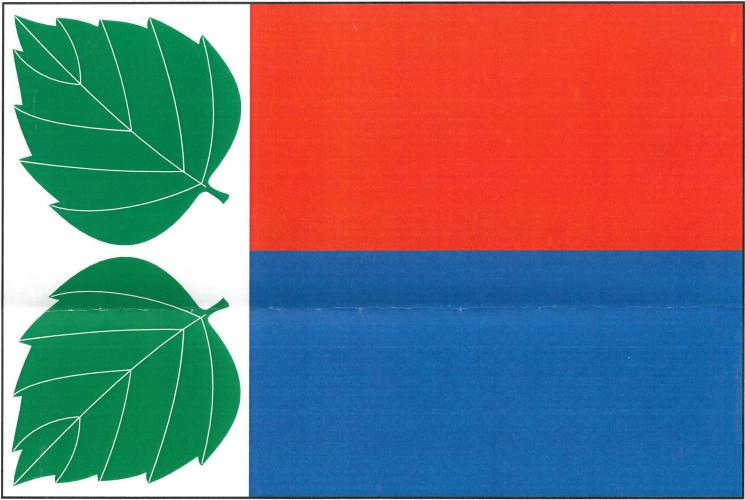
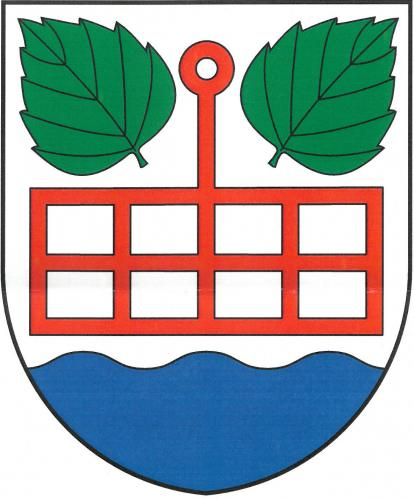
- Flag Coat of arms

- Location in the Czech Republic
- Coordinates: 50°32′55″N 15°1′58″E
- Country: Czech Republic
- Region: Central Bohemian
- District: Mladá Boleslav
- First mentioned: 1222

Area
  - Total: 5.62 km^{2} (2.17 sq mi)
- Elevation: 237 m (778 ft)

Population (2026-01-01)
  - Total: 445
  - Density: 79.2/km^{2} (205/sq mi)
- Time zone: UTC+1 (CET)
  - Summer (DST): UTC+2 (CEST)
- Postal codes: 294 11, 295 01
- Website: brezina-nad-jizerou.cz

Březina is a municipality and village in Mladá Boleslav District in the Central Bohemian Region of the Czech Republic. It has about 400 inhabitants.

== Administrative division ==
Březina consists of two municipal parts (in brackets population according to the 2021 census):

- Březina (396)
- Honsob (35)

== Etymology ==
The name means 'birch forest' in Czech. The village was founded on the site of a cleared birch forest.

== Geography ==
Březina is located about 16 kilometres (10 mi) northeast of Mladá Boleslav and 23 km (14 mi) south of Liberec. It lies in the Jičín Uplands. The highest point is on the slope of the Mužský hill at 408 m (1,339 ft) above sea level. The Jizera River forms part of the municipal border in the north.

The eastern part of the municipal territory lies in the Bohemian Paradise Protected Landscape Area. In this area is located Žabakor Pond, the largest body of water in Bohemian Paradise with an area of 45 ha (110 acres). It was founded for fish farming in the 16th century and today it is an important nesting site for water birds, protected as a nature reserve.

== History ==
The first written mention of Březina is from 1222.

== Demographics ==
Historical population

Year	Pop.	±%
1869	439	—
1880	478	+8.9%
1890	485	+1.5%
1900	467	−3.7%
1910	459	−1.7%

Year	Pop.	±%
1921	417	−9.2%
1930	397	−4.8%
1950	331	−16.6%
1961	358	+8.2%
1970	335	−6.4%

Year	Pop.	±%
1980	359	+7.2%
1991	329	−8.4%
2001	335	+1.8%
2011	377	+12.5%
2021	431	+14.3%

Source: Censuses

== Transport ==
The D10 motorway (part of the European route E65) from Prague to Turnov runs through the municipality.

== Sights ==
The main landmark of Březina is the Church of Saint Lawrence. It was built at the turn of the 13th and 14th centuries and rebuilt in the Renaissance style in the 16th century. It is a stone church with a wooden tower floor.
