= Březina (former Tišnov District) =

- Municipality
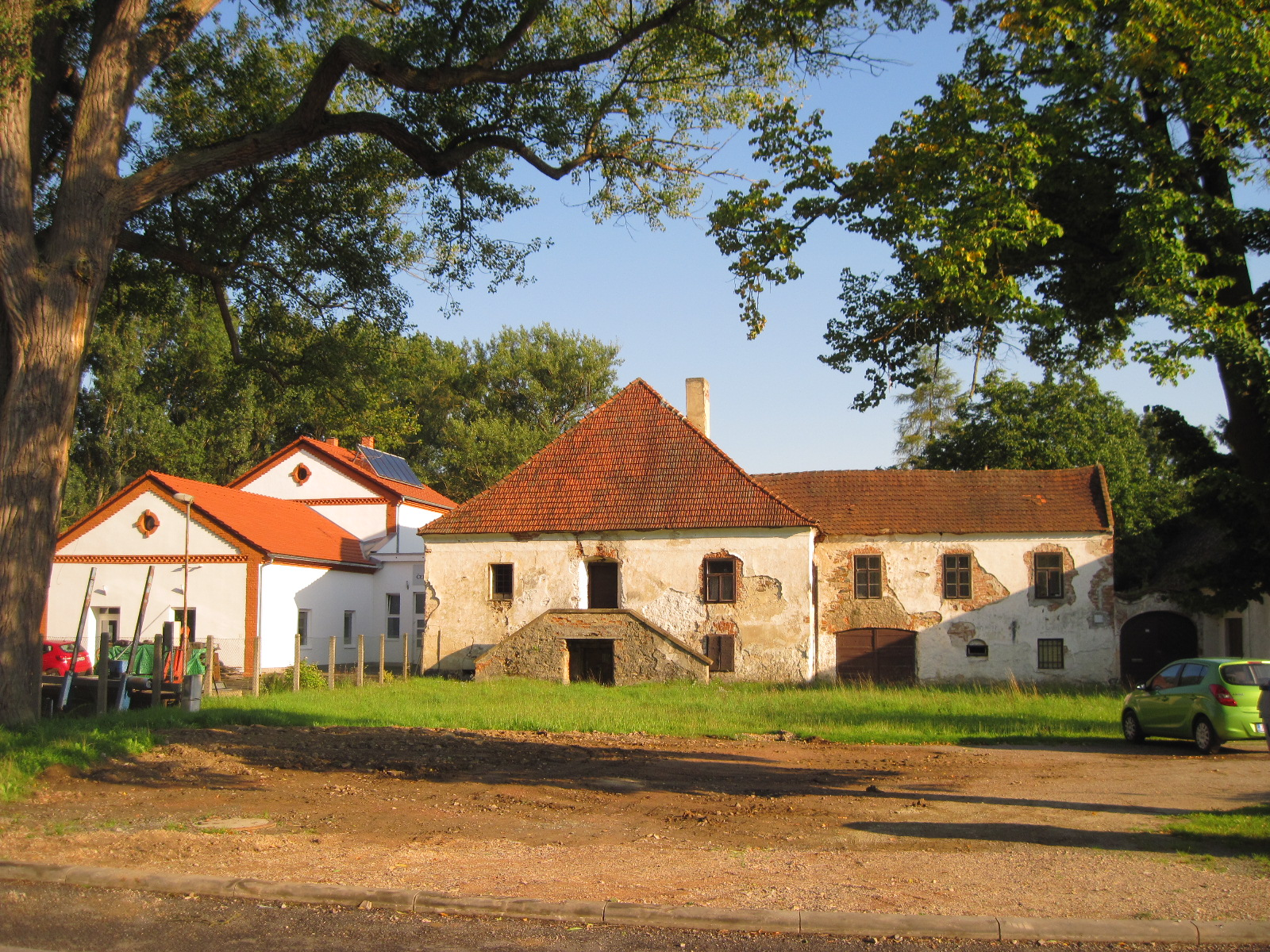
- Water mill and small water plant

- Flag Coat of arms

- Location in the Czech Republic
- Coordinates: 49°19′17″N 16°25′17″E
- Country: Czech Republic
- Region: South Moravian
- District: Brno-Country
- First mentioned: 1232

Area
  - Total: 3.19 km^{2} (1.23 sq mi)
- Elevation: 247 m (810 ft)

Population (2026-01-01)
  - Total: 379
  - Density: 119/km^{2} (308/sq mi)
- Time zone: UTC+1 (CET)
  - Summer (DST): UTC+2 (CEST)
- Postal code: 666 01
- Website: www.brezina-tisnovsko.cz

Březina is a municipality and village in Brno-Country District in the South Moravian Region of the Czech Republic. It has about 400 inhabitants.

== Geography ==
Březina is located about 18 kilometres (11 mi) northwest of Brno. It lies on the border between the Boskovice Furrow and Křižanov Highlands. The highest point is at 415 m (1,362 ft) above sea level. The municipality is situated on the right bank of the Svratka River.

== History ==
The first written mention of Březina is from 1232 when Přemysl, Margrave of Moravia, donated the village to the Porta coeli Convent.

From 1986 to 1990, the formerly sovereign municipality of Březina was a part of Tišnov. Since 24 November 1990, Březina has been a separate municipality again.

== Demographics ==
Historical population

Year	Pop.	±%
1869	178	—
1880	194	+9.0%
1890	193	−0.5%
1900	170	−11.9%
1910	191	+12.4%

Year	Pop.	±%
1921	194	+1.6%
1930	198	+2.1%
1950	232	+17.2%
1961	262	+12.9%
1970	253	−3.4%

Year	Pop.	±%
1980	237	−6.3%
1991	194	−18.1%
2001	230	+18.6%
2011	268	+16.5%
2021	343	+28.0%

Source: Censuses

== Transport ==
There are no railways or major roads passing through the municipality.

== Sights ==
The only protected cultural monuments in the municipality are two stone crosses, dating from 1841 and 1846, and a late Baroque calvary from the second half of the 18th century.
