= Western Berezina =

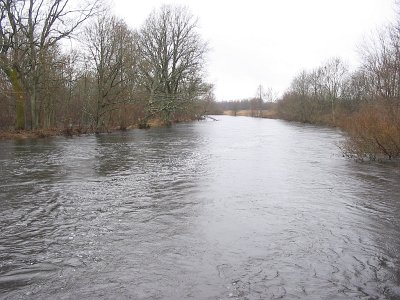
- The Western Berezina in spring
- Native name: Заходняя Бярэзіна (Belarusian)

Location
- Country: Belarus

Physical characteristics
- Source
  - location: near Maladechna
- Mouth: Neman
  - coordinates: 53.8056°N 25.9834°E
- Length: 226 km (140 mi)
- Basin size: approx. 4,000 km^{2} (1,500 sq mi)
- Discharge
  - average: 30 m^{3}/s (1,100 cu ft/s)

Basin features
- Progression: Neman→ Baltic Sea
- Tributaries
  - left: Islach

The Western Berezina, or simply Berezina (Belarusian: Заходняя Бярэзіна, romanized: Zakhodnyaya Byarezina or Zachodniaja Biarezina), is a river in Belarus, a right tributary of the river Neman.

It flows for 226 km and its basin area is approximately 4,000 km^{2}. The river rises near Maladechna. Its longest tributary is the Islach (102 km).
