= Maidenform =

Women's underwear brand

- Logo
- Industry: Apparel
- Founded: 1922; 104 years ago
- Founder: Enid Bissett; Ida Rosenthal; William Rosenthal
- Parent: Hanesbrands
- Website: www.maidenform.com

Maidenform Brands is a manufacturer of women's bras, underwear, and shapewear founded in 1922.

== History ==
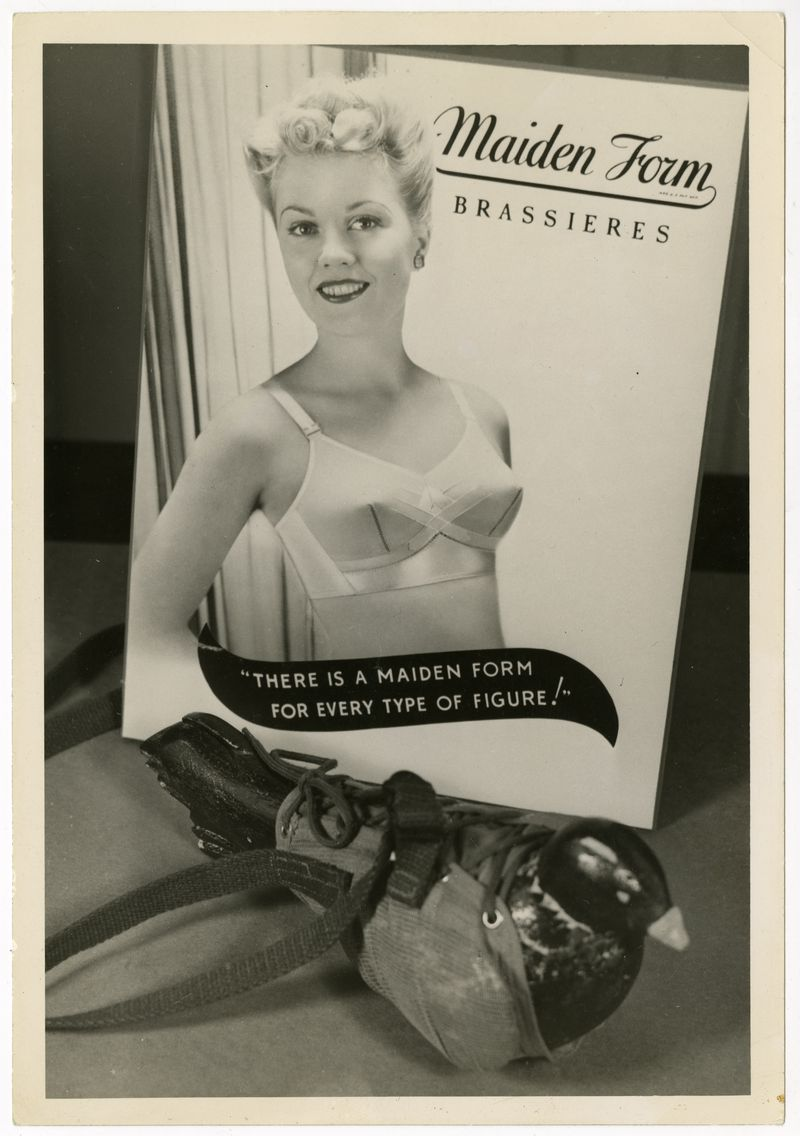
A vintage Maidenform advertisement and a pigeon vest produced by the company

The company was founded in Bayonne, New Jersey, in 1922 and sought to appeal to the flapper subculture of the time.

Maidenform converted factories during World War II in order to produce pigeon vests and parachutes. Pigeon vests, sometimes called pigeon bras, attached war pigeons to paratroopers' chests so that the paratrooper could land in a war zone and release the bird, which would fly away carrying a message. Maidenform was contracted to produce 28,500 of these pigeon vests for the United States Armed Forces.

The company's target audience and marketing changed over the decades. Through the 1950s, advertisements emphasized women's roles as wives and shoppers, while in the 1960s and 1970s they began to depict models as independent and capable of holding careers. By the 1990s, Maidenform advertisements began emphasizing comfort and fit.

In 1997, Maidenform filed for Chapter 11 bankruptcy protection. It recovered from bankruptcy in 1999 and began manufacturing overseas. It then became a publicly traded company in July 2005. In 2013, Hanesbrands purchased Maidenform for $575 million, equivalent to $776.17 million in 2024.
