= Březina (surname) =

Březina (feminine: Březinová) is a Czech surname. The word březina means 'birch forest' and the surname originated as a designation for a person who lives near a birch forest. Notable people with the surname include:

- David Březina (born 1997), Czech footballer
- Eliška Březinová (born 1996), Czech figure skater
- Ivona Březinová (born 1964), Czech writer
- Jan Březina (born 1954), Czech politician
- Michal Březina (born 1990), Czech figure skater
- Otokar Březina (1868–1929), Czech poet
