= Society of Friends of Science in Wilno =

Society of Friends of Science in Wilno (Polish: Towarzystwo Przyjaciół Nauk w Wilnie) was a Polish scientific society which functioned in Wilno (since 1945 Vilnius) from 1906 to 1939. The Society was involved with the reopening of the Stefan Batory University in Wilno. One of its presidents was Marian Zdziechowski, a popular figure in the pre-World War II Wilno.

The Society was destroyed during World War II by the occupying authorities.
