= Islach =

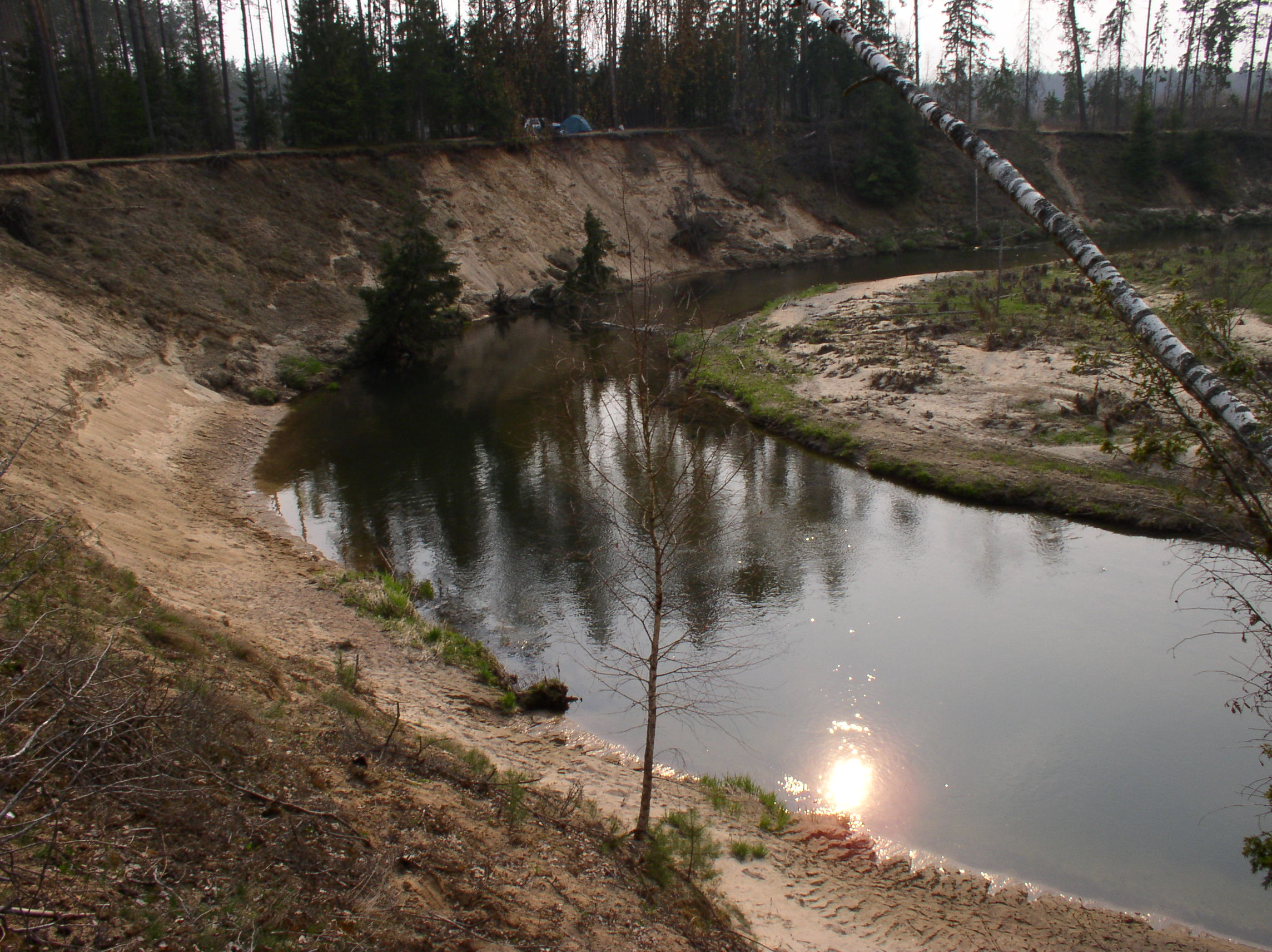

Location
- Country: Belarus

Physical characteristics
- Mouth: Western Berezina
  - coordinates: 53°54′48″N 26°12′57″E
- Length: 102 km (63 mi)
- Basin size: 1,330 km^{2} (510 sq mi)

Basin features
- Progression: Western Berezina→ Neman→ Baltic Sea

The Islach (Belarusian: Іслач, Russian: Ислочь, romanized: Isloch) is a river in Belarus, a left tributary of the Western Berezina.

The 102 km long river's basin area is 1,330 km^{2}.
