= Minsky Uyezd =

Uyezd of Minsk Governorate, Russian Empire

Minsky Uyezd (Russian: Минский уезд) was one of the uyezds of Minsk Governorate and the Governorate-General of Minsk of the Russian Empire and then of Byelorussian Soviet Socialist Republic with its seat in Minsk from 1793 until its formal abolition in 1924 by Soviet authorities.

== Demographics ==
At the time of the Russian Empire Census of 1897, Minsky Uyezd had a population of 277,149. Of these, 59.2% spoke Belarusian, 23.1% Yiddish, 9.5% Russian, 7.1% Polish, 0.4% Tatar, 0.4% German, 0.1% Ukrainian and 0.1% Mordvin as their native language.
