= Igor Kovalevsky =

Russian Latin Catholic priest (born 1965)

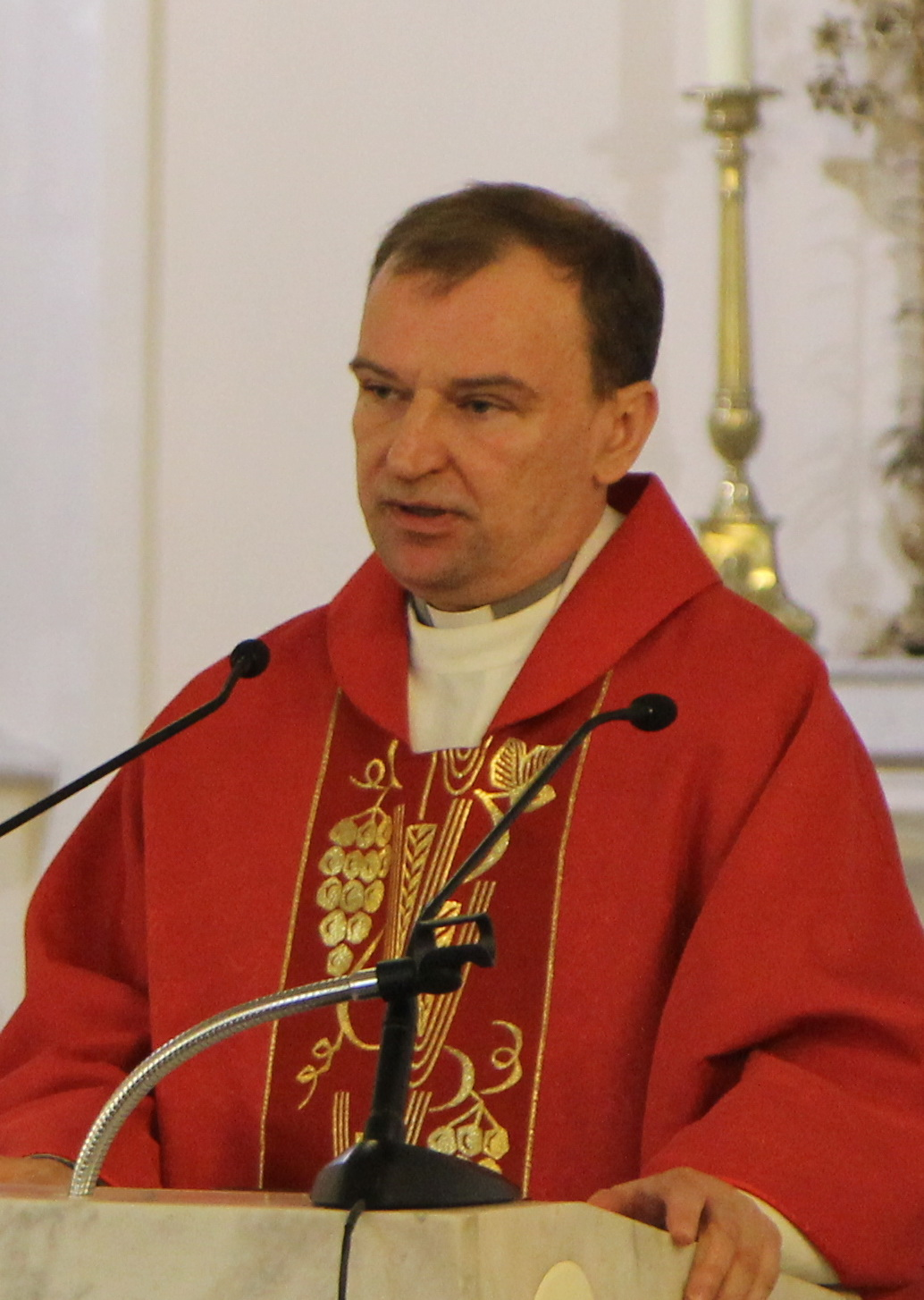

Orders
- Ordination: 4 June 1998

Personal details
- Born: 5 August 1965 (age 61) Vovchansk, Kharkiv Oblast, Ukrainian SSR
- Denomination: Catholic Church
- Occupation: General secretary of the Conference of Catholic Bishops of Russia, Director of Caritas in the European Part of Russia, Administrator of parish of Saints Peter and Paul Cathedral in Moscow
- Education: Bauman Moscow State Technical University, Moscow State University, Archdiocesan Major Seminary in Białystok, Catholic University of Lublin

Igor Leonidovich Kovalevsky (born 5 August 1965) is a Catholic priest, general secretary of the Conference of Catholic Bishops of Russia from 1999 to 2020, the administrator parish of Saints Peter and Paul Cathedral in Moscow, director of Caritas in the European Part of Russia.

== Biography ==
Kovalevsky's family has Polish roots.

=== Education ===
In 1997 he was ordained a deacon in the Cathedral of the Assumption of the Blessed Virgin Mary in Saint Petersburg. Ordained a priest on 4 June 1998 in the Cathedral of Moscow.

He graduated from high school in the Crimea, after graduation went to Moscow, where graduated from the Power Engineering Faculty (E) of Bauman Moscow Higher Technical School (BMHTS, now BMSTU or Bauman Moscow State Technical University) and continued his studies at the Mechanics and Mathematics Faculty of Moscow State University (MSU). In 1992 he entered Archdiocesan Major Seminary in Białystok. In 1998, Kovalevsky graduated from Catholic University of Lublin, and in 2002 got his Doctor of Theology degree from the same university.

Kovalevsky is a polyglot and is known to address his multinational parishioners in different languages: English, Italian, French, Polish, Lithuanian, Spanish, Ukrainian, Russian, Vietnamese and others.

=== Career ===
Before he was ordained, Kovalevsky worked at Rocket and Space Corporation Energia.

As of August 2011 was Secretary-General of the Conference of Catholic Bishops of Russia, Chancellor of the Curia (the diocesan administration) Archdiocese of the Mother of God, the dean of the Central Region, member of the advisory council and the Mother of God Archdiocese priests and the administrator of the Cathedral of the Immaculate Conception in Moscow.

On 16 April 2009, he became a member of the Council for Cooperation with Religious Organizations under the President of the Russian Federation. Kovalevsky is also a member of the Public Council under the Ministry of Internal Affairs of the Russian Federation.

He is a professor at St. Thomas Institute of Moscow.

Kovalevskiy is a chaplain of Magistral Delegation of Russia of the Order of the Holy Sepulchre.

Catholic Church titles
Preceded by Position created	General Secretary of the Conference of Catholic Bishops of Russia; 1999–2020	Succeeded by Stephan Lipke
