= Diocese of the Transfiguration at Novosibirsk =

Roman Catholic diocese in Russia

Diocese of the Transfiguration at Novosibirsk Dioecesis Neosiberiana Transfigurationis Преображенской епархии в Новосибирске
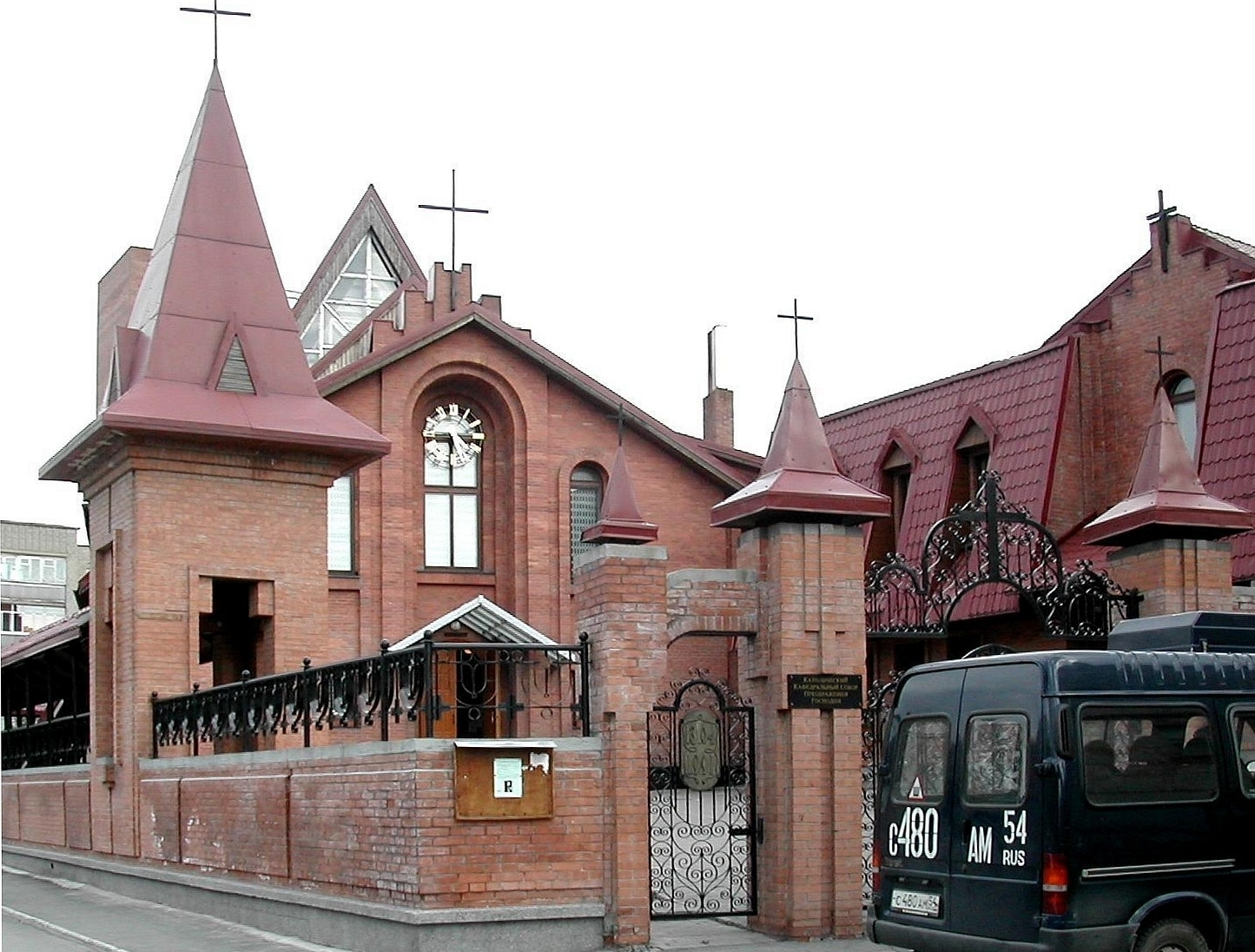
- Cathedral of the Transfiguration

Location
- Country: Russia
- Metropolitan: Mother of God at Moscow

Statistics
- Area: 2,000,000 km^{2} (770,000 sq mi)
- Population: Total; Catholics: (as of 2010); 25,000,000; 500,000 (2.0%)

Information
- Rite: Latin Rite
- Cathedral: Cathedral of the Transfiguration

Current leadership
- Pope: Leo XIV
- Bishop: Joseph Werth, S.J.
- Auxiliary Bishops: Stephan Lipke, S.J.

Map
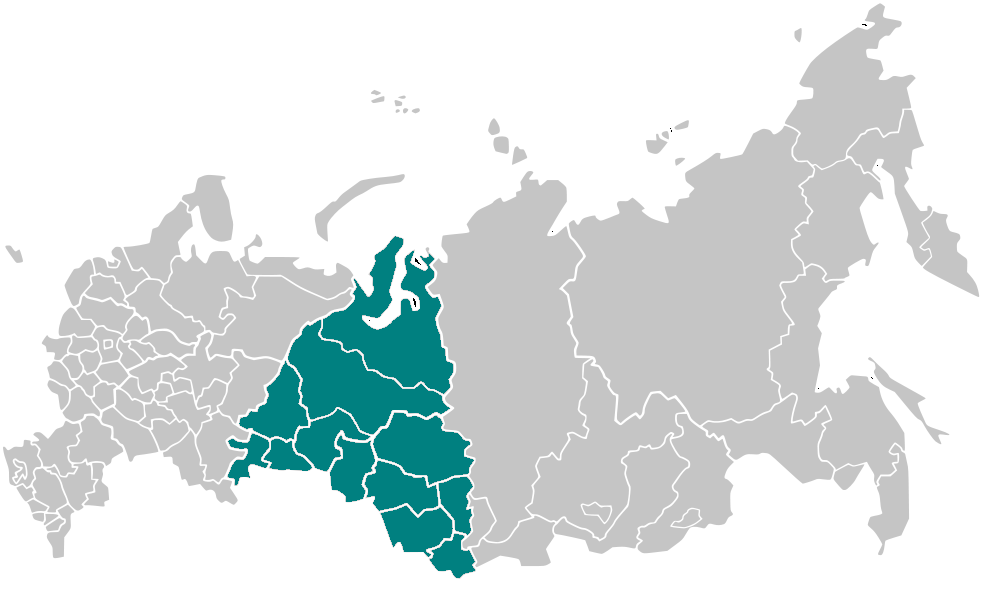

The Diocese of the Transfiguration at Novosibirsk (Latin: Dioecesis Neosiberiana Transfigurationis) is a suffragan Latin Church diocese of the Catholic Church in the ecclesiastical province of the Mother of God at Moscow.

Its cathedral episcopal see is the Cathedral of the Transfiguration, in the city of Novosibirsk, in Siberia (Asian Russia).

== History ==
- Established on April 13, 1991 as Apostolic Administration of Novosibirsk, on territory split off from the Diocese of Vladivostok and the Metropolitan Archdiocese of Mohilev (now Archdiocese of Minsk-Mohilev)
- Renamed on May 18, 1999 as Apostolic Administration of Western Siberia, having lost territory to establish the then Apostolic Administration of Eastern Siberia (now Diocese of Saint Joseph at Irkutsk)
- Promoted and renamed-back on February 11, 2002 as Diocese of the Transfiguration at Novosibirsk

== Ordinaries ==
(all Roman rite, so far missionary members of Latin congregations)

Apostolic Administrators of Novosibirsk (Siberia)

- Joseph Werth, Jesuits (S.J.), (1991.04.13 – 1999.05.18 see below), Titular Bishop of Bulna (1991.04.13 – 2002.02.11)
- Jerzy Mazur, Divine Word Missionaries (S.V.D.) (1998.03.23 – 1999.05.18), Titular Bishop of Tabunia (1998.03.23 – 2002.02.11), later Apostolic Administrator of Eastern Siberia (Russia) (1999.05.18 – 2002.02.11), Apostolic Administrator of Yuzhno Sakhalinsk (Russia) (2000 – 2003.04.17), Bishop of Saint Joseph at Irkutsk (Russia) (2002.02.11 – 2003.04.17), Bishop of Ełk (Poland) (2003.04.17 – ...)

Apostolic Administrator of Western Siberia

- Joseph Werth, S.J. (see above 1999.05.18 – 2002.02.11 see below)

Suffragan Bishops of (Transfiguration at) Novosibirsk

- Joseph Werth, S.J. (see above 2002.02.11 - ...), President of Conference of Catholic Bishops of Russia (2005.02 – 2011.01.19)

== Statistics ==
As per 2014, it pastorally served 512,000 Catholics (2.0% of 25,600,000 total) on 2,000,000 km^{2} in 70 parishes and 160 missions with 38 priests (19 diocesan, 19 religious), 1 deacon and 77 lay religious (20 brothers, 57 sisters).

Dependent churches include:

- Holy Trinity Church, Tobolsk
- St. Anne's Church, Yekaterinburg
- St. John Chrysostom Church, Novokuznetsk
- St. Joseph's Church, Tyumen
- Church of the Intercession of the Virgin Mary, Tomsk

== See also ==
- Roman Catholicism in Russia

== Sources and external links ==
- GCatholic.org, with Google satellite photo
- Catholic Hierarchy
- Siberian Catholic Newspaper - website of the press service of the Diocese of the Transfiguration at Novosibirsk
- Catholic Church in Western Siberia
- St. Nicholas Catholic Orphanage in Novosibirsk
