= St. Peter and St. Paul's Church, Tula =

Latin Catholic parish church in Russia

Coordinates: 54.1836°N 37.6058°E

St. Peter and St. Paul's Church
- Храм Святых Апостолов Петра и Павла
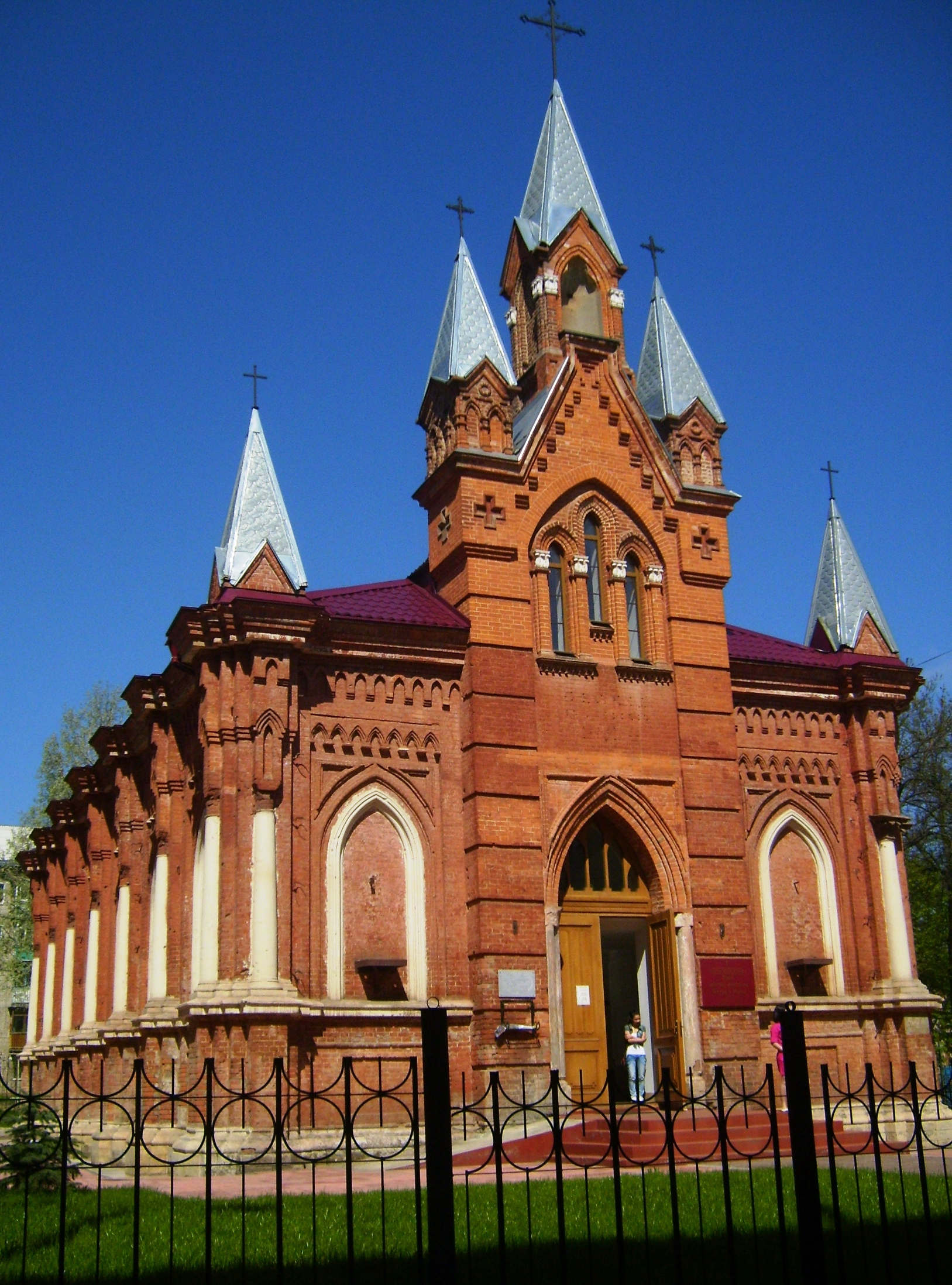
- St. Peter and St. Paul's Church
- Location: Tula
- Country: Russia
- Denomination: Catholic Church

St. Peter and St. Paul's Church (Russian: Храм Святых Апостолов Петра и Павла) is a parish of the Catholic Church located in Tula, Russia. It is a Latin Church parish of the Archdiocese of Moscow.

== History ==
At the turn of the twentieth century, there were already a thousand Catholics in Tula and its surroundings, and the former chapel there became insufficient. The community received permission to build a church on May 28, 1893. The new brick church, built in the neo-Gothic style by the architect Skawronski, was consecrated in 1896. After the revolution of 1917 and the end of World War I in the West, many Poles migrated to the new Poland, and the parish was weakened. The church property was nationalized in 1918 and closed in 1932. A newspaper occupied the building.

The Catholic parish was restored in 1993 and temporarily settled in 1995 in an old garage. In 2015 it received permission to recover the church, which required restoration. It re-opened on December 23, 2007 and Archbishop Paolo Pezzi blessed it on July 6, 2008.

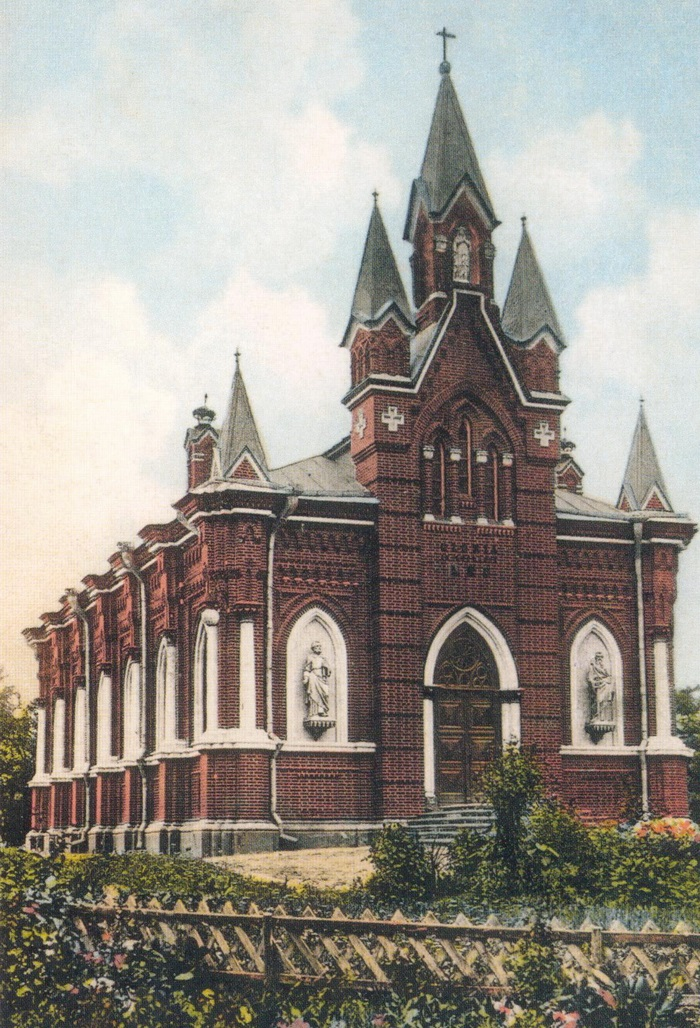
The church at the beginning of the XX century

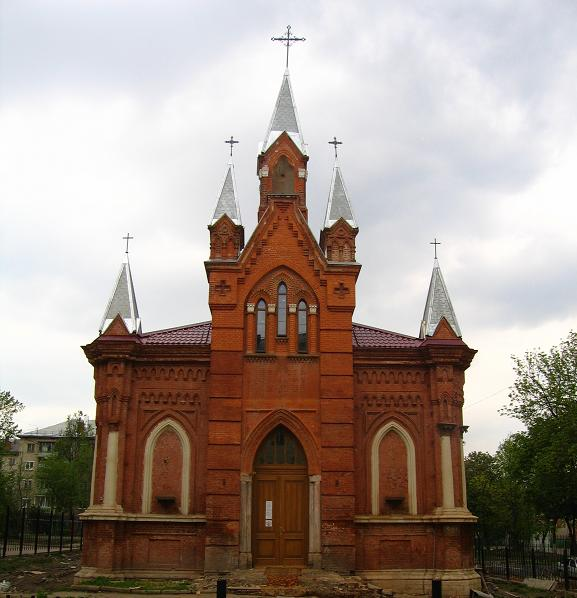
The church in 2008

== See also ==
- Catholic Church in Russia
- St. Peter and St. Paul's Church

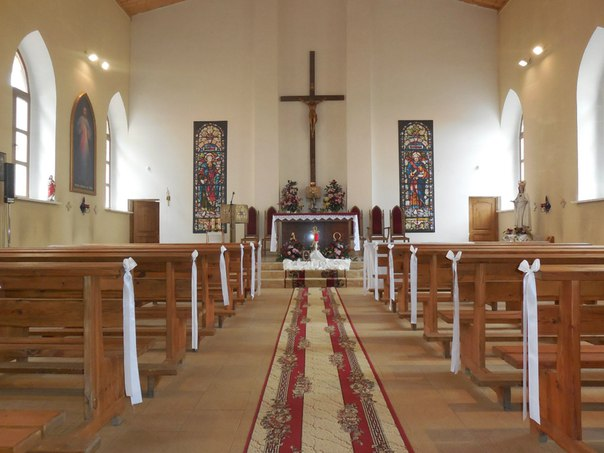
Internal View
