= Nicolai Dubinin =

Russian Roman Catholic prelate (born 1973)

The Most Reverend Nicolai Dubinin O.F.M. Conv.
- Auxiliary Bishop of Mother of God at Moscow
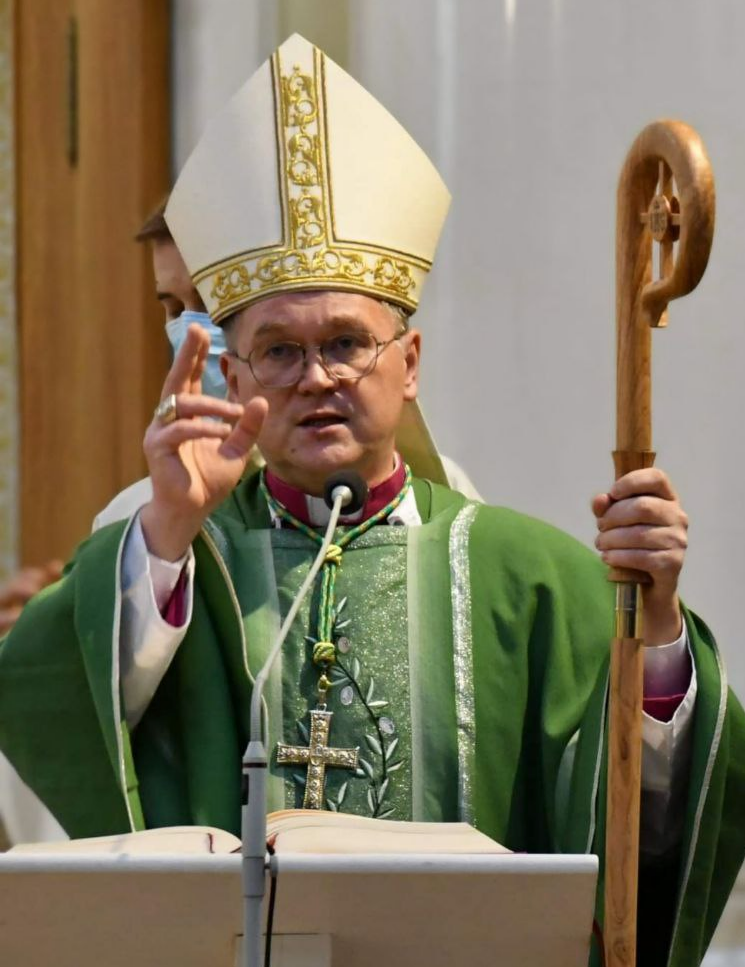
- Church: Roman Catholic Church
- Archdiocese: Mother of God at Moscow
- See: Mother of God at Moscow
- Appointed: 30 July 2020
- Other posts: Vice-President of the Union of the European Conferences of Major Superiors (2018–); Titular Bishop of Aquae in Byzacena (2020-)
- Previous post: General Custos for the Order of Friars Minor Conventual in Russia (2005–18)

Orders
- Ordination: 24 June 2000 by Tadeusz Kondrusiewicz
- Consecration: 4 October 2020 by Paolo Pezzi

Personal details
- Born: Nikolai Gennadyevich Dubinin; 27 May 1973 (age 53) Novoshakhtinsk, Rostov Oblast, Russian SFSR
- Education: Rostov State University; University of Lublin
- Coat of arms

Styles of The Most Rev. Msgr Nicolai Dubinin O.F.M. Conv.
- Reference style: The Most Reverend
- Spoken style: Your Excellency
- Religious style: Monsignor
- Posthumous style: n/a

Nicolai Gennadyevich Dubinin, O.F.M. Conv. (Russian: Николай Геннадьевич Дубинин, pronounced [nʲɪkɐˈlaj ɡʲɪˈnadʲjɪvʲɪdʑ dʊˈbʲinʲɪn]; born 27 May 1973) is a Russian Catholic prelate who has served as an auxiliary bishop for the Roman Catholic Archdiocese of Moscow since 2020. He has also served as apostolic administrator since 2026.

== Life ==
Dubinin was born in a family of intelligentsia as the younger among two children in the present day Southern Federal District. His paternal relatives were local Russian Orthodox while his maternal relatives were Roman Catholics in Byelorussian SSR. According to the Belarus rules for mixed unions, he had to be christened as Roman Catholic as a second child in a family. Nevertheless, he was "unfairly" christened in the Moscow Patriarchate just like his older sister. By his own admission, “he became a member of the Catholic Church as soon as the opportunity arose, in 1991, at the age of 18”.

After graduation of the school education, joined Faculty of Philology at the Rostov State University (1990–1993), but subsequently entered to the Order of Friars Minor Conventual in 1994; he made a profession on September 8, 1995 and a solemn profession on October 3, 1998, and was ordained as priest on June 24, 2000, after graduation of the Major Franciscan Theological Seminary in Łódź, Poland and Catholic University in Lublin, Poland.

He returned to Russia and began to work in the Franciscan parishes and as superior of the different local Franciscan communities, with the break during 2002–2005, when he studied at the Pastoral Liturgical Institute in Padua, Italy with the licentiate of the Liturgical Theology degree. From 2005 until 2018 he served as a General Custos of the Order of Friars Minor Conventual in Russia and at the same time was a lecturer at the Major Theological Seminary of Mary – the Queen of Apostles in Saint Petersburg, Russian Federation.

On July 30, 2020, he was appointed by the Pope Francis as an Auxiliary Bishop of the Roman Catholic Archdiocese of Mother of God at Moscow and Titular Bishop of Aquae in Byzacena. On October 4, 2020, he was consecrated as bishop by Metropolitan Archbishop Paolo Pezzi and other prelates of the Roman Catholic Church in the Cathedral of the Immaculate Conception in Moscow.

Catholic Church titles
Preceded by Jorge Martín Torres Carbonell	Titular Bishop of Aquae in Byzacena; 2020–	Succeeded by Incumbent
