= Aquae in Byzacena =

Africa Proconsularis (125 AD)

The Diocese of Aquensis in Byzacena is a home suppressed and titular see of the Roman Catholic Church.

The diocese was centered on Aquensis a civitas of the Roman province of Byzacena, which is tentatively identified with El Hamma in modern Tunisia.

Mesnage, attributes two bishops:

- Gennaro, who took part at the Council of Cabarsussi in 393, made up of bishops Maximianus, Donatist sect;
- Crescente, that Victor of Vita, in his history of the persecution of the Vandals, calls metropolitanus Aquitanae civitatis'. Crescente name appears in the Roman martyrology on 28 November.

However, Morcelli, identifies only one bishop of this diocese – Vittoriano, who participated for the Catholic side, in the Council of Carthage (411).

Today Aquensis in Byzacena survives as titular bishopric and the current bishop is Nicolai Dubinin, O.F.M.Conv, Auxiliary Bishop of Roman Catholic Archdiocese of Moscow.
