= Transfiguration of the Lord Church, Tver =

Coordinates: 56.8572°N 35.9281°E

Transfiguration of the Lord Church
- Храм Преображения Господня
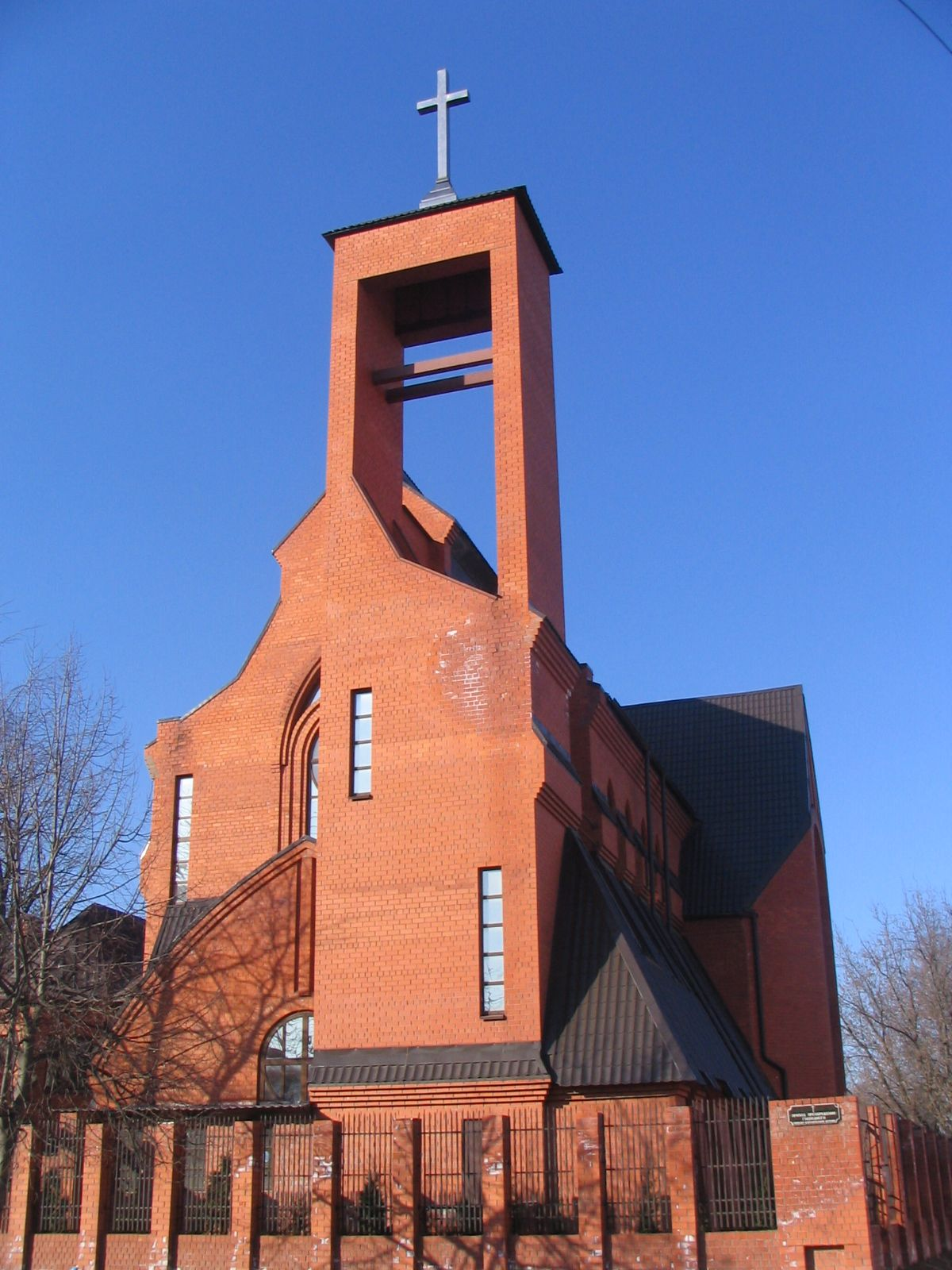
- Transfiguration of the Lord Church
- Location: Tver
- Country: Russia
- Denomination: Roman Catholic Church

The Transfiguration of the Lord Church (Russian: Храм Преображения Господня) It is a Catholic church in Tver, belonging to the Archdiocese of the Mother of God in Moscow in the Russian Federation, built between 1994 and 2002.

== History ==
The Catholic parish of Tver existed since the early nineteenth century. In 1864, a larger room with bodies, a presbytery and a church was built vast library. The church was confiscated in 1920 and disjointed library. Secularized, the church was demolished in 1974.

In the 1990s, the parish was again officially registered and a new church consecrated by Archbishop Tadeusz Kondrusiewicz in 2003.

== Architecture and interior decoration ==
The temple is a tall building made a red brick, that combines elements of modernism and gothic. The temple is built in the shape of a cross, with a transverse transept. Transept and altar part have triangular ends. On the right side of the transept there is a statue of the Mother of God, and on the left side there is an image of the last Supper. The stations of the Way of the Cross service are made in the form of gilded reliefs. The floor and throne are made of colored marble. Above the main façade there is a high rectangular bell tower.

== Abbots ==
- f. Mikhail Nutskovsky (2021 — present)
- m. Zbigniew Krul (2020—2021)
- f. Vladislav Voydat (2002—2008)
- f. Richard Masin (1994—2002)

== See also ==
- Roman Catholicism in Russia
- Transfiguration of the Lord
