= St. Nicholas' Church, Luga =

Coordinates: 58.7425°N 29.8503°E

St. Nicholas' Church
- Храм Святого Николая
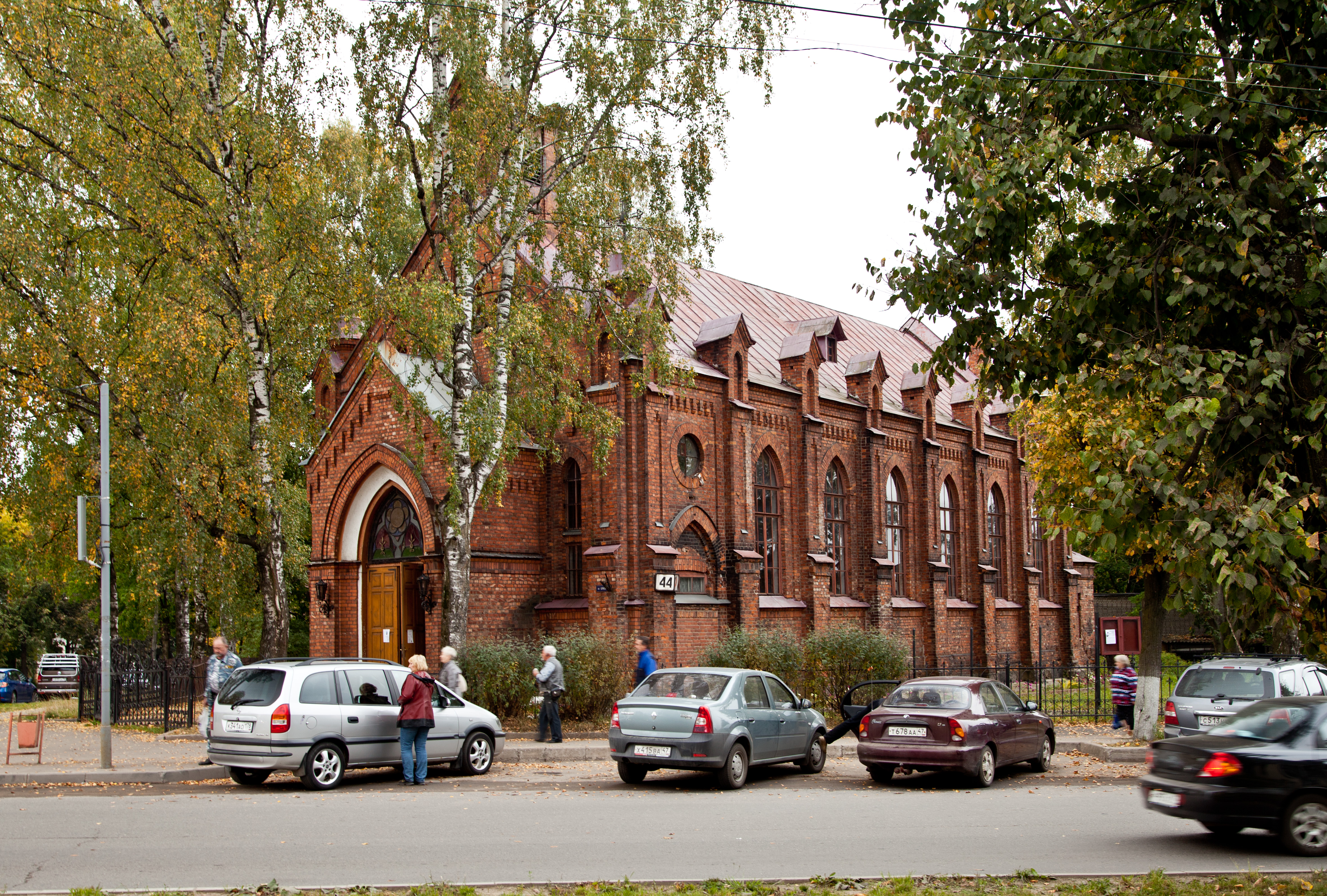
- St. Nicholas' Church
- Location: Luga
- Country: Russia
- Denomination: Roman Catholic Church

St. Nicholas' Church (Russian: Храм Святого Николая) is a parish of the Roman Catholic Church located in Luga near St. Petersburg in the Leningrad Oblast in northern Russia. It is a constituent of the Northwest Deanery of the Latin Archdiocese of Moscow, having been restored to Catholic ownership in 1996. The parish church, built in the Gothic Revival style, is a protected monument.

== History ==
At the end of the nineteenth century almost five hundred Catholics were living in the town of Luga, mostly workers of the railway line. The parish registered and requested permission in 1895 to build a wooden chapel. The authorization was granted in 1902 by which time there were an increased the number of faithful, so they decided to build a small brick church. The Gothic design plans were entrusted to the architect Dietrich. It was dedicated on 29 June 1904 to Saint Nicholas. A few months later, Fr. Antoni Malecki opened a parochial school for children from poor families.

Amidst the Stalinist repression, the church was closed in 1937; the priest, organist, and nineteen active parishioners were executed. The building was converted into a gymnasium. After the fall of the USSR, it was returned to the Catholic Church and, in 1996, reconsecrated.

== See also ==
- Roman Catholicism in Russia
- St. Nicholas' Church
- Parish's Official Website (in Russian and English)

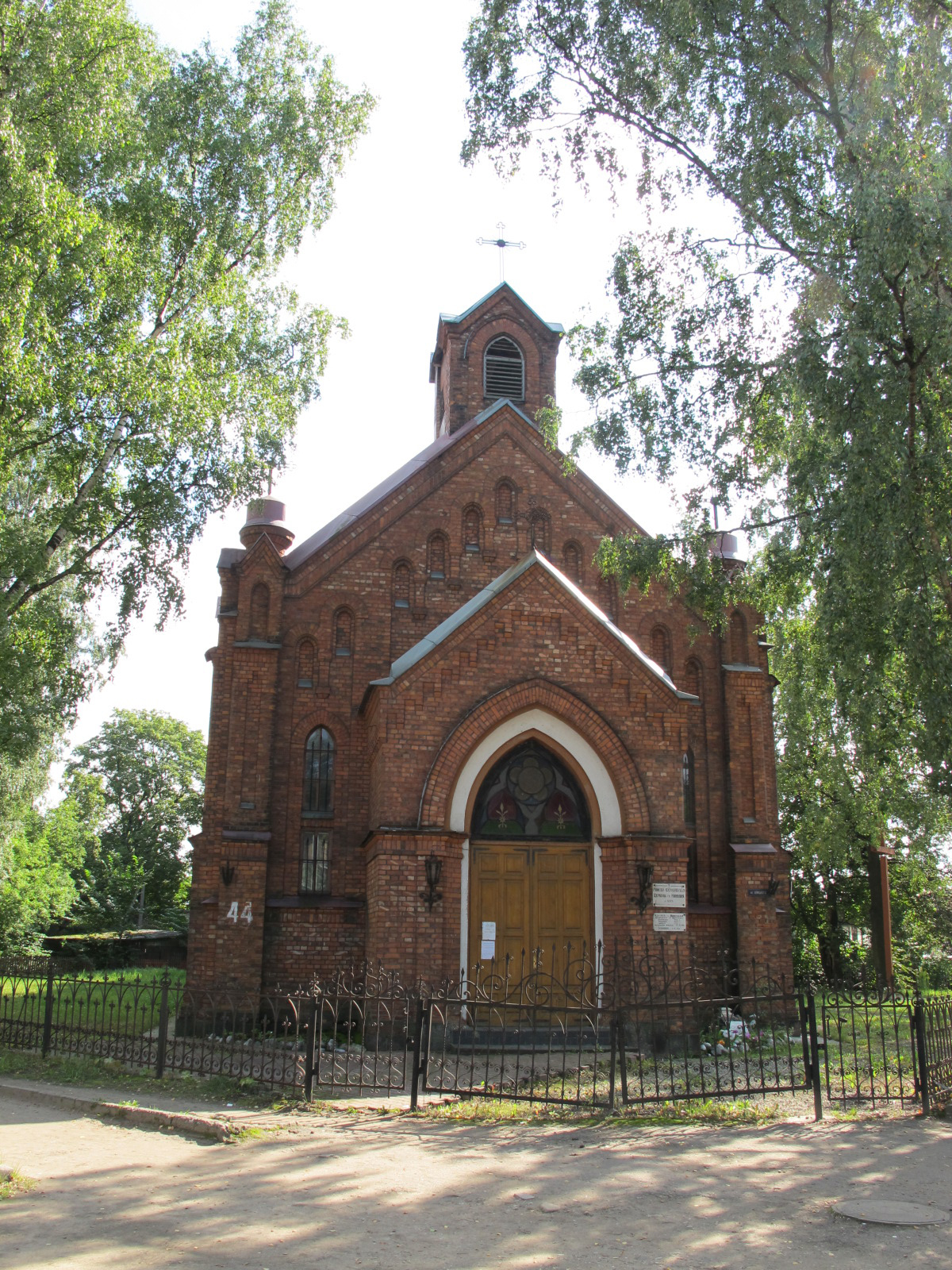
Another View
