= Church of the Intercession of the Virgin Mary, Tomsk =

Coordinates: 56.4897°N 84.9525°E

Church of the Intercession of the Virgin Mary
- Храм Покрова Пресвятой Богородицы Царицы Святого Розария
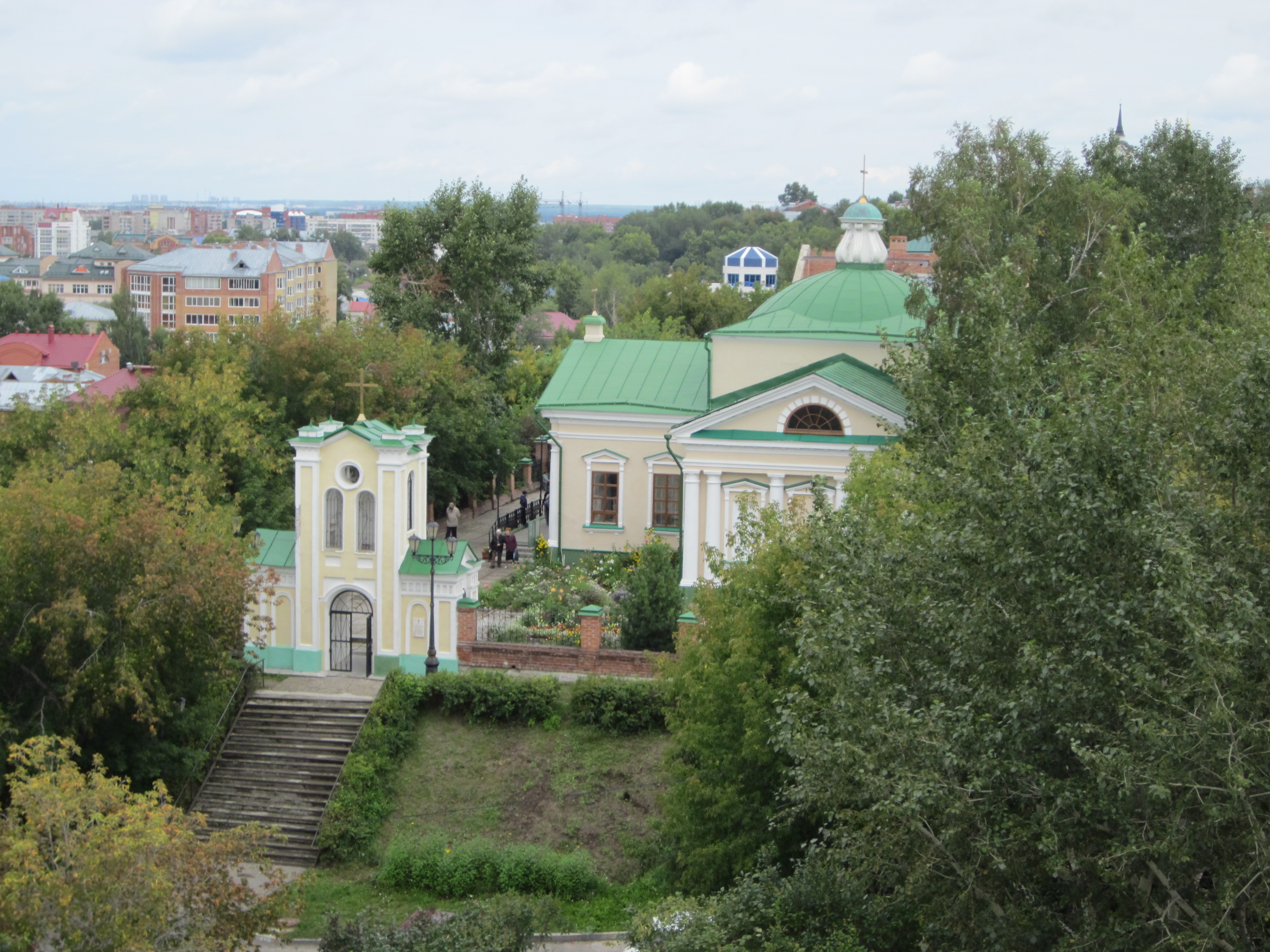
- Church of the Intercession of the Virgin Mary
- Location: Tomsk
- Country: Russia
- Denomination: Roman Catholic Church
- Website: catholic-tomsk.ru

The Church of the Intercession of the Virgin Mary or more formally Church of the Intercession of the Virgin Mary, Queen of the Holy Rosary (Russian: Храм Покрова Пресвятой Богородицы Царицы Святого Розария) is a Catholic church in Tomsk, Russia. under the patronage of the intercession of the Blessed Virgin Mary. Tomsk, a city known for its universities and rich historical tradition, is located within the Roman Catholic Diocese of the Transfiguration at Novosibirsk.

Since 1978 it is protected as an object of cultural heritage of regional value.

== History ==
Tomsk was the historical center of the Catholic community in Siberia, consisting of Poles, Belarusians and Lithuanians sent to Siberia after the Polish uprising of November 1830. For this reason, the church is commonly called the Polish church by locals. Count Alexander Maszynski, Polish diplomat Francophile, took the initiative in its construction. It was completed in 1833 and consecrated on November 7, 1833. This was the first Catholic church in Western Siberia. An organ was installed in 1862.

The church was "nationalized" in 1922 and then closed by communist authorities in 1938, when it was then "given to the people for their own use". After the fall of communism, the building was returned to the Catholic community and reconsecrated on October 6, 1991.

Bishop Joseph Werth, S.J. asked the Society of Jesus to take responsibility for the parish and school in 2014. Two orders of religious women also serve the parish. The Sisters Servants of Jesus in the Eucharist prepare liturgies and teach catechism. The Missionaries of Charity support the poor and homeless.

== School ==
The Catholic Gymnasium of Tomsk, Russia is a private, coed, K-11 school run by the Society of Jesus (the Jesuits) and associated with the Church of the Intercession of the Virgin Mary, Tomsk. "gymnasium" is a European term for college preparatory schools. It is the only Catholic secondary school in Russia.

The Catholic Gymnasium was registered as a parish school on April 9, 1993 by the Catholic diocese. The first classes were held in the church and parish house. In 2012, a new school building was constructed, which now houses the upper school (grades 5-11). In 2019, the former parish house was renovated into the current lower school (grades K-4). A large, historic, wooden house across the street was then renovated into the new parish center and Jesuit community. The school is fully accredited and awards diplomas to graduates of the 11th grade, almost all of whom continue their studies at local universities.

== See also ==
- Roman Catholicism in Russia

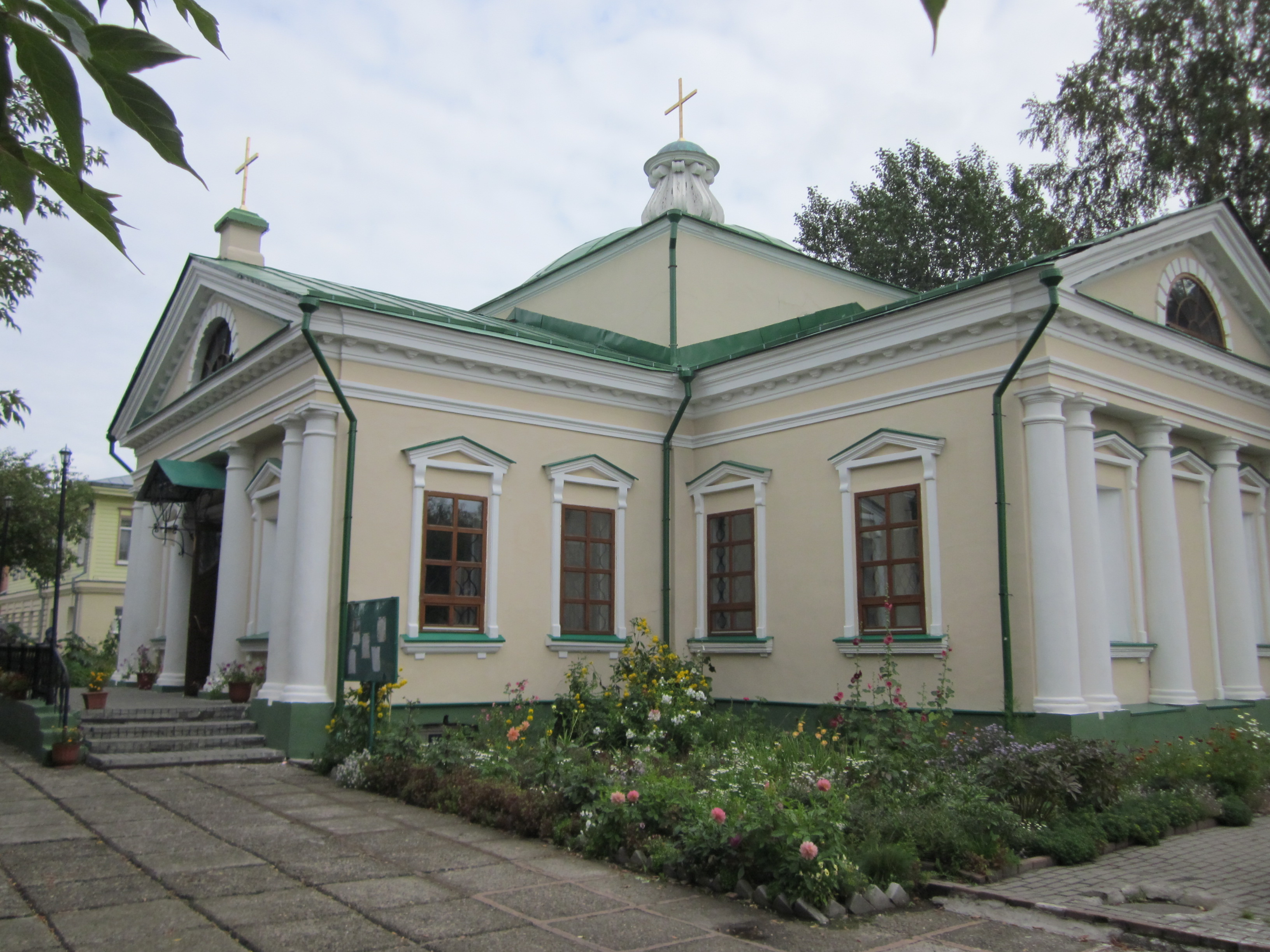
Ground level view of the church
