= Novoshakhtinsk =

City in Rostov Oblast, Russia

Novoshakhtinsk Новошахтинск
- City
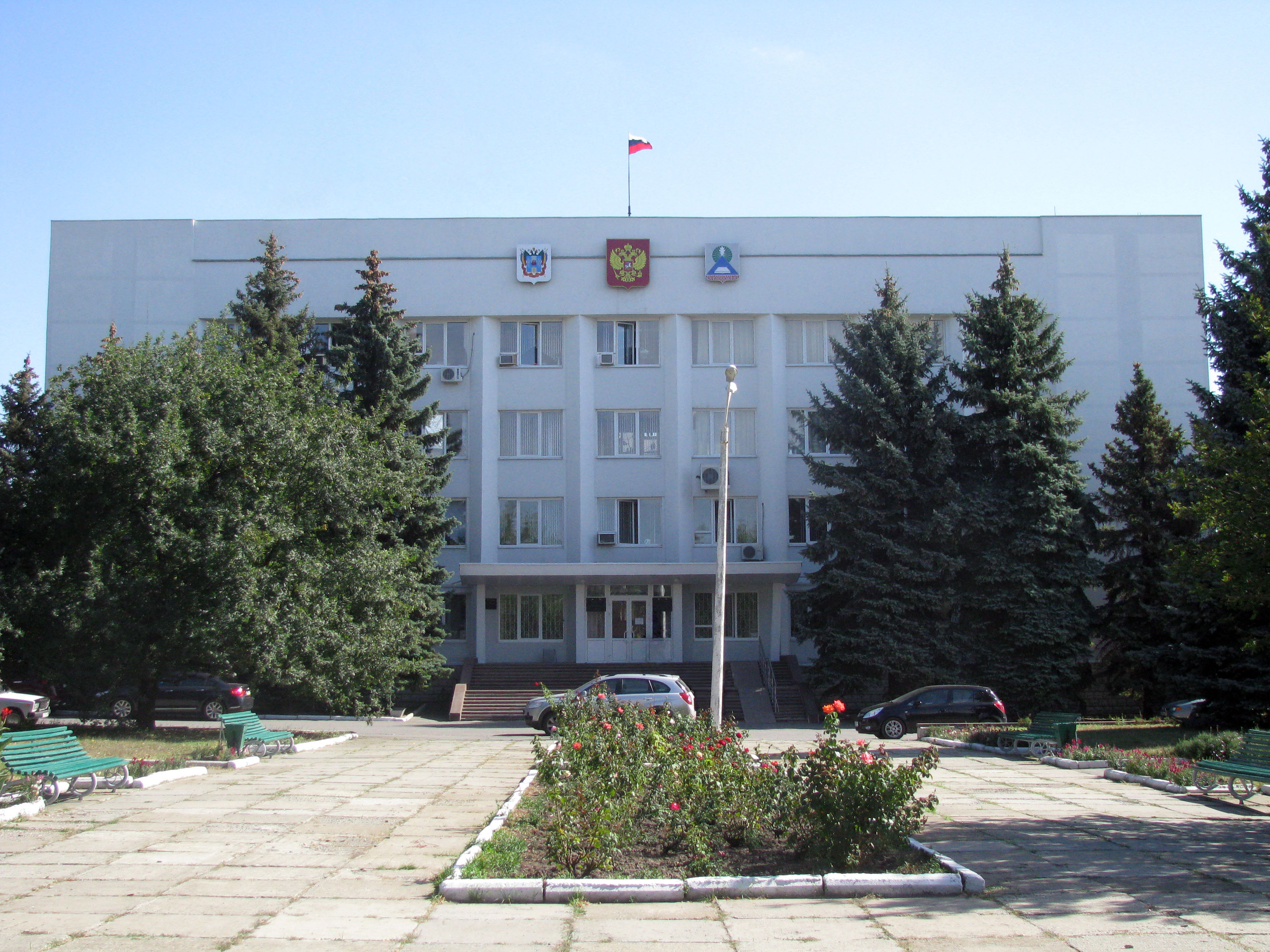
- City Administration building

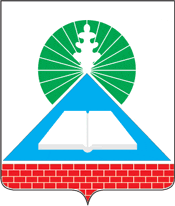
- Coat of arms
- Interactive map of Novoshakhtinsk
- Location of Novoshakhtinsk Novoshakhtinsk (Rostov Oblast)
- Coordinates: 47°46′N 39°55′E
- Country: Russia
- Federal subject: Rostov Oblast
- Founded: 1939

Government
  - Body: Council of Deputies
  - Mayor: Sergey Bondarenko
- Elevation: 130 m (430 ft)

Population (2010 Census)
  - Total: 111,075
  - Estimate (2025): 100,738 (−9.3%)
  - Rank: 143rd in 2010

Administrative status
  - Subordinated to: Novoshakhtinsk Urban Okrug
  - Capital of: Novoshakhtinsk Urban Okrug

Municipal status
  - Urban okrug: Novoshakhtinsk Urban Okrug
  - Capital of: Novoshakhtinsk Urban Okrug
- Time zone: UTC+3 (MSK)
- Postal code: 346900
- Dialing code: +7 86369
- OKTMO ID: 60730000001
- Website: www.novoshakhtinsk.org

Novoshakhtinsk (Russian: Новоша́хтинск) is a mining city in Rostov Oblast, Russia, within 20 kilometres of the Dovzhansky border crossing to Ukraine.

== History ==
It was established in 1939. This was where Novosakhtinsk NKVD/MVD prisoner of war camp No. 430 was located, where German, Austrian, Hungarian, and Romanian prisoners of war were taken to forced labor in mining from 1945.08.27 to 1948.06.22.

The population was: 111,075 (2010 census); 101,131 (2002 census); 107,772 (1989 Soviet census).

=== Russo-Ukrainian War ===
During the 2022 Russian Invasion of Ukraine, the Novoshakhtinsk refinery refinery in the city was damaged and set ablaze in a targeted strike by a Ukrainian Mugin-5 Pro drone in June 2022. Russian state media outlet TASS reported no casualties, and the resulting fire was extinguished. An unverified video of the drone strike recorded by Russian oil refinery workers began circulating on social media, which pro-Ukrainian activists used to mock the Russian air defense systems that failed to stop the drones. The video was also posted to the YouTube channel run by Ukraine's land forces, who referred to the blaze as a “holy fire.”

On 19 December 2024 the refinery was struck again by Ukrainian drones and missiles, according to the General Staff of the Armed Forces of Ukraine. The involvement of the Ukrainian Navy and recent attacks near the facility pointed to the use of Neptune missiles. An extensive fire at the refinery was detected by NASA's FIRMS.

On 21 August 2025 Ukrainian drones again attacked and caused fire at the refinery, even though it was reportedly defended by Pantsir and Tor anti-aircraft systems.

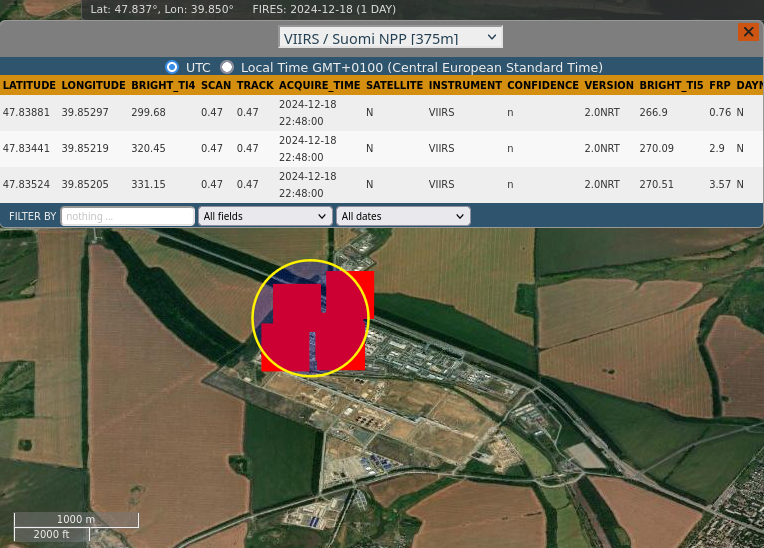
NASA's FIRMS detected extensive fire at the Novoshakhtinsk oil refinery on 18 December 2024 22:48:00 (UTC)

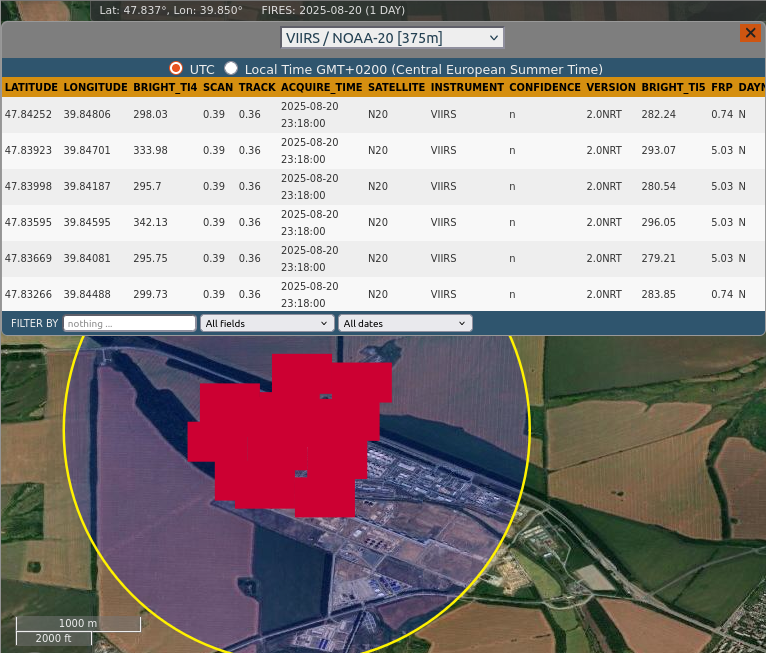
NASA's FIRMS detected extensive fire 20 August 2025 23:18:00 (UTC) at the Novoshakhtinsk oil refinery

== Administrative and municipal status ==
Within the framework of administrative divisions, it is incorporated as Novoshakhtinsk Urban Okrug—an administrative unit with the status equal to that of the districts. As a municipal division, this administrative unit also has urban okrug status.

== Notable people ==
- Sergei Butenko (born 1960), football player and coach
- Nicolai Dubinin (born 1973), Roman Catholic prelate
