= Stephan Lipke =

German Roman Catholic prelate (b. 1975)

Stephan Lipke SJ
- Titular Bishop of Arena
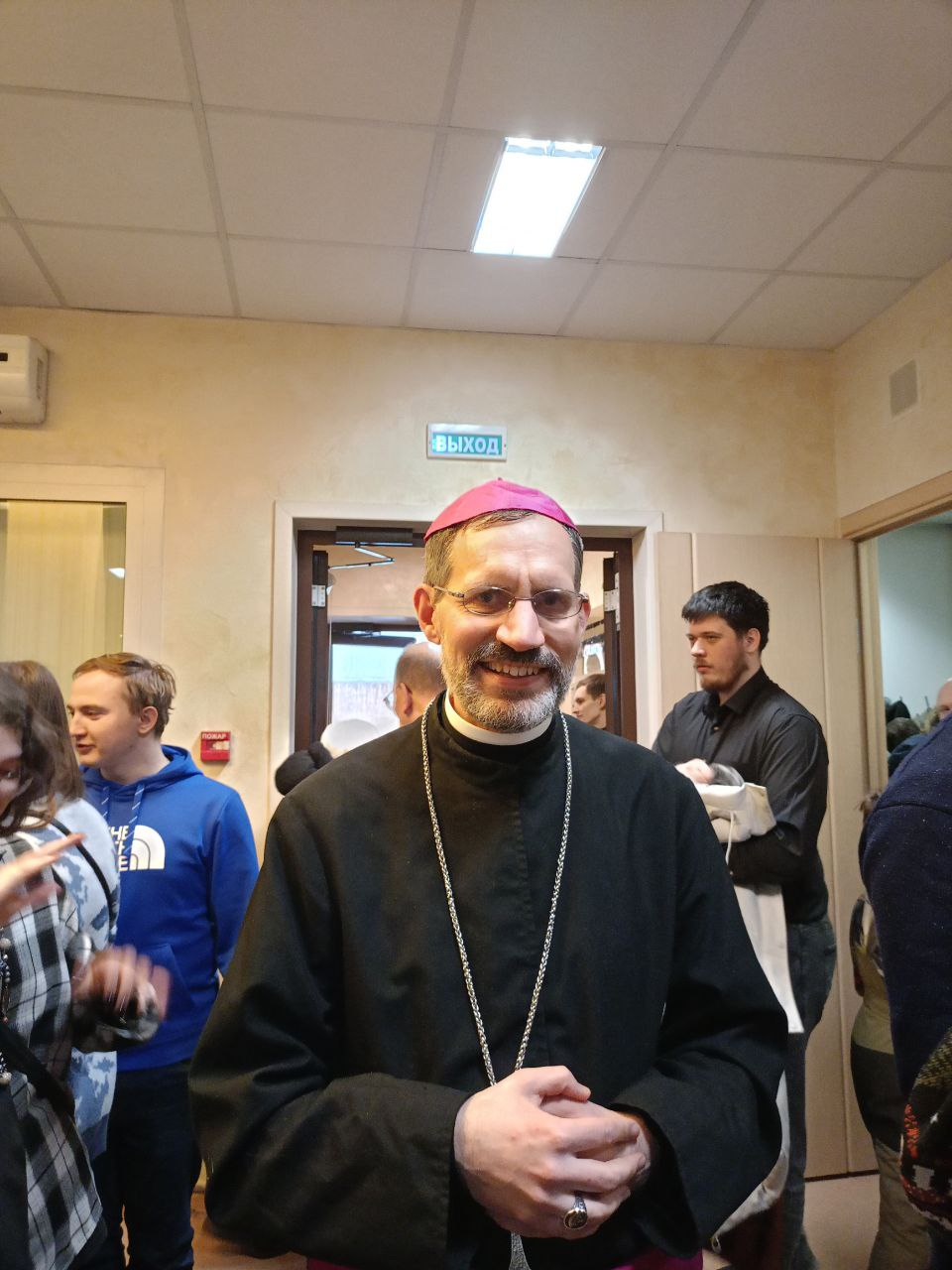
- Appointed: 12 September 2024

Orders
- Ordination: 7 June 2002 by Joachim Meisner
- Consecration: 2 February 2025 by Joseph Werth

Personal details
- Born: 31 December 1975 (age 50) Essen, West Germany
- Motto: Obsecramus pro Christi
- Coat of arms

Stephan Lipke SJ (born 31 December 1975) is a German Roman Catholic bishop who serves as the titular bishop of Arena and appointed Auxiliary Bishop of the Transfiguration at Novosibirsk.

== Early life and ministry ==
Stephan was born on 31 December 1975 in the city of Essen in West Germany. He graduated from the University of Bonn in the year 2000 in Philosophical and Theological Studies. He was ordained a deacon on the 10 June 2001 by Bishop Friedhelm Hofmann and later a priest on the 7 June 2002 by Cardinal Joachim Meisner in the city of Cologne.

He entered the novitiate of the Society of Jesus in Nuremberg as a priest on 24 September 2006 and made his first vows on 14 September 2008. From 2008 to 2011, he was assigned to Munich, Germany, to work with adults who wanted to become Catholics. In 2011, he was sent to Russia, where he worked first in Tomsk, teaching at the Catholic Gymnasium and serving as parish priest of Our Lady Queen of the Holy Rosary Parish from 2014 to 2017.

He obtained a master's degree in Russian Literature from the Faculty of Philology at Tomsk State University in 2017. Following his studies, he completed a Tertianship in Manila (Philippines) from 2017 to 2018. In 2018, he became director of the St. Thomas Institute in Moscow and editor-in-chief of the journal Simvol. He was also appointed consultor of superior of the Independent Russian Region.

On May 19, 2019, in Falenica, Warsaw, he made his solemn religious profession in the presence of Fr Arturo Sosa, Superior General of the Society of Jesus. He has been a member of the Greater Poland and Mazovia Province since the merger of the Independent Russian Region and the Greater Poland and Mazovia Province, which took place in 2020. In the same year, he became general secretary of the Russian Episcopal Conference, Superior of the Jesuit community in Moscow, and secretary to the Superior of the PMA Russian Region. Additionally, he serves as a delegate of the superior of the Russian Region for the Protection of Children and Young People, assists in pastoral work at St. Louis Parish in Moscow, ministers to the Missionary Sisters of Charity, and teaches at both the Jesuit St. Thomas Institute and the Orthodox St. Filaret Institute.

In addition to his native German language, he is fluent in English and Russian. He has a good command of Italian, Spanish, and French. He can also handle Polish, Ukrainian, and Filipino.

Since 2020 he has been the general secretary of the Conference of Catholic Bishops of the Russian Federation.

He was appointed the titular bishop of Arena and the Auxiliary Bishop of the Transfiguration at Novosibirsk on 12 September 2024 and was consecrated bishop on 2 February 2025.

Catholic Church titles
| Preceded by Igor Kovalevsky | General Secretary of the Conference of Catholic Bishops of the Russian Federation; 2020–present | Incumbent |
