= St. Joseph's Church, Tyumen =

Coordinates: 57.1500°N 65.5333°E

St. Joseph's Church
- Церковь Святого Иосифа Обручника
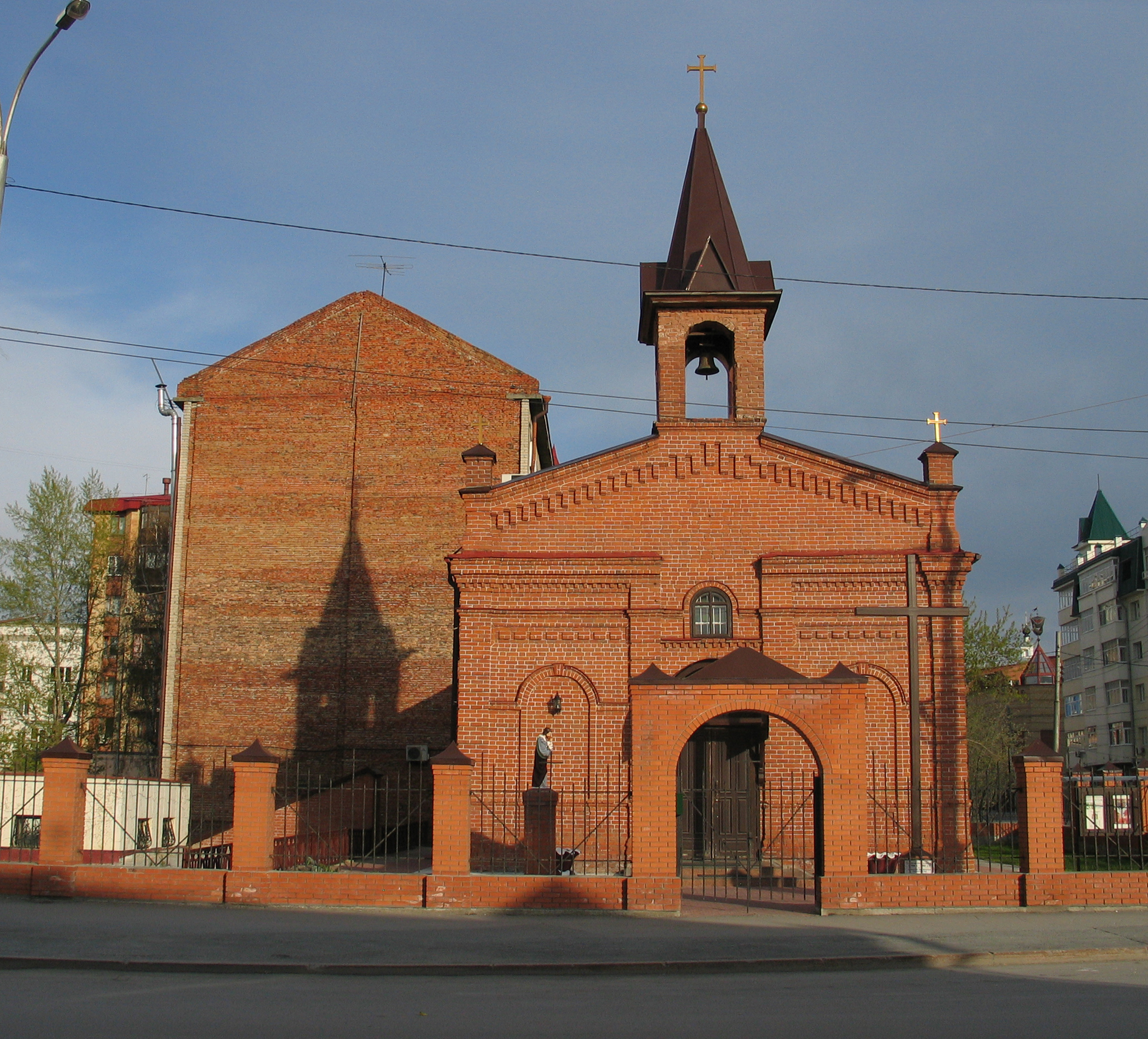
- St. Joseph's Church
- Location: Tyumen
- Country: Russia
- Denomination: Roman Catholic Church

History
- Status: Object of cultural heritage of the peoples of the Russian Federation of regional significance
- Founded: 1903

Architecture
- Years built: 1903-1906

Administration
- Diocese: Roman Catholic Diocese of the Transfiguration at Novosibirsk

St. Joseph's Church (Russian: Церковь Святого Иосифа Обручника) is a parish of the Roman Catholic Church in the city of Tyumen, Russia, in the Diocese of Transfiguration at Novosibirsk. The parish church is located at 7 Lenin Street.

On the territory of the church there is a monument to the patron saint – Joseph the Betrothed (Russian: Иосиф Обручник).

In the interior of the church there are hanging large chandeliers, an altar decorated with flowers, bright stained glass windows, a statue of Mary (Russian: Богородица).

== History ==
The church was built between 1903 and 1906 by parishioners from Poland, thanks in part to the financial means of the family of Polish mines magnate Alfons Koziell-Poklewski (1809–1890). The first Masses were held in 1904.

It was closed during the Soviet era and was used as a warehouse, student club, and gym. It returned to the parish community in the early 1990s and religious ceremonies resumed starting in 1993. The church celebrated its centenary in 2004.

== See also ==
- Catholic Church in Russia

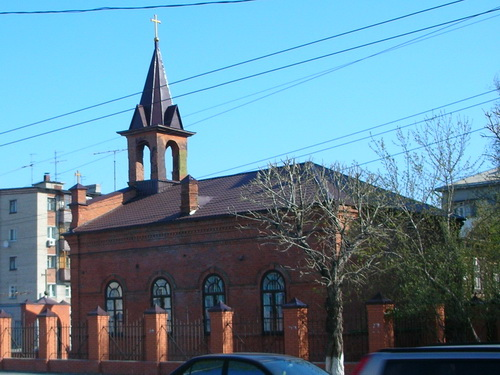
Another view
