= Priestly Fraternity of the Missionaries of St. Charles Borromeo =

Roman Catholic society of apostolic life

The Priestly Fraternity of the Missionaries of St. Charles Borromeo (FSCB), or also known as the Fraternity of St. Charles, is a Catholic society of apostolic life founded in Rome on 14 September 1985 by Fr Massimo Camisasca. The fraternity obtained pontifical recognition in 1999.

== History ==
The group started with seven priests and ten seminarians, but now numbers about 150 priests. The fraternity was explicitly inspired by the person and charism of Fr Luigi Giussani, the Italian founder of the lay movement Communion and Liberation. The fraternity is present in over thirty countries including Italy, Germany, United Kingdom, Spain, Austria, Hungary, the United States, Mexico, Chile, Paraguay, Taiwan, Kenya and Russia. Prominent members include Massimo Camisasca, Bishop Emeritus of Reggio Emilia-Guastalla, Italy, and Paolo Pezzi, the Archbishop Emeritus of Mother of God at Moscow.

The missionaries are trained in their House of Formation in Rome. The motto of the Fraternity of St. Charles is Passio Christi Gloria (Latin for "Passion for the Glory of Christ").

On 25 March 2007, an order of sisters, called Missionaries Sisters of Saint Charles Borromeo was founded, modeled after the Fraternity of St. Charles.

== See also ==
- Servant of God Luigi Giussani
- Communion and Liberation
