= Joseph Werth =

Russian-German prelate (born 1952)

The Most Reverend Joseph Werth SJ
- Bishop of Transfiguration at Novosibirsk
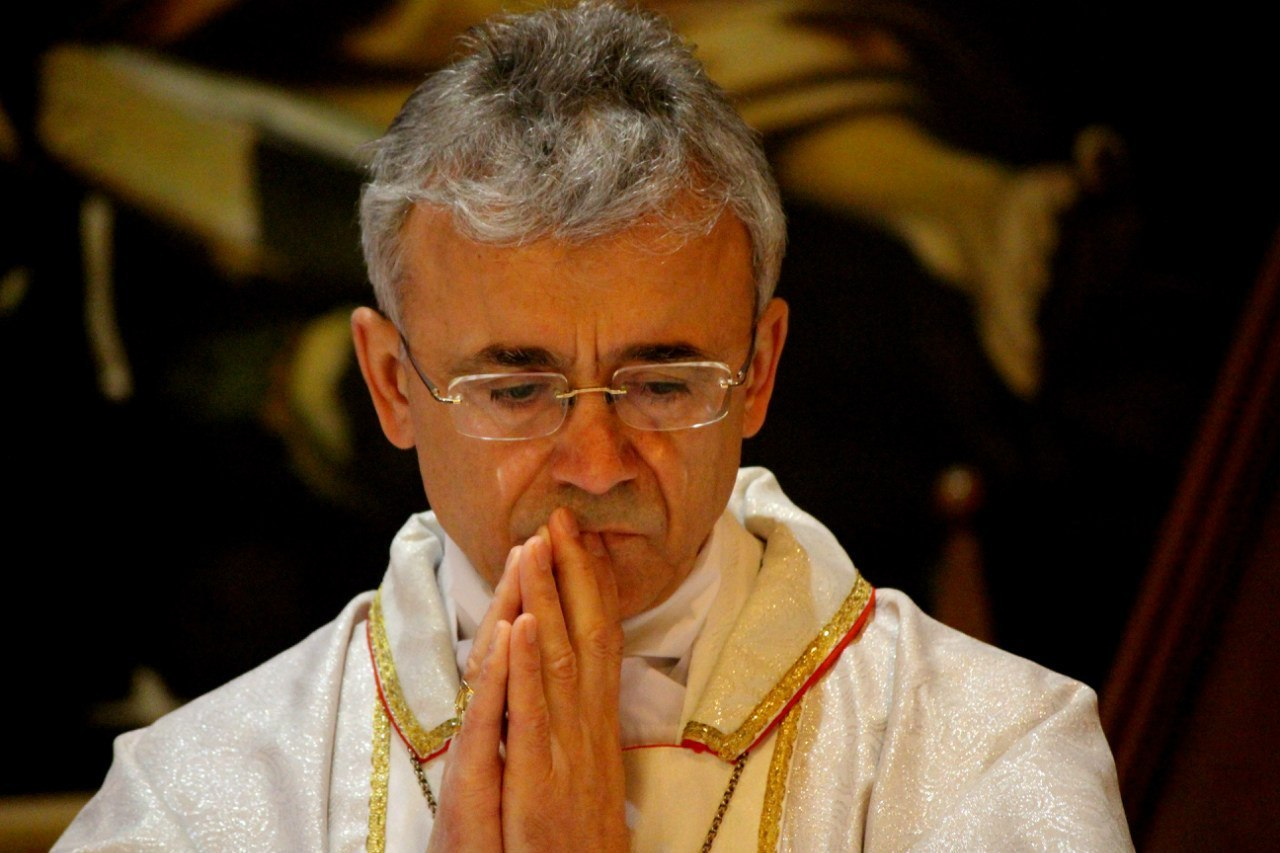
- Church: Catholic Church
- See: Latin Diocese of Transfiguration at Novosibirsk
- In office: February 11, 2002–present

Orders
- Ordination: May 28, 1983 (deacon); May 27, 1984 (priest)
- Consecration: June 16, 1991 by Francesco Colasuonno, Tadevush Kandrusievich, and Juozas Tunaitis

Personal details
- Born: October 4, 1952 (age 74) Karaganda, Kazakh SSR, Soviet Union
- Coat of arms

Ordination history
History
Episcopal consecration
- Principal consecrator: Francesco Colasuonno
- Co-consecrators: Tadevush Kandrusievich, and Juozas Tunaitis
Episcopal succession
Bishops consecrated by Joseph Werth as principal consecrator
- Stephan Lipke: February 2, 2025

Joseph Werth SJ (Russian: Иосиф Иоганнович Верт; born October 4, 1952) is a Russian-German Catholic prelate who has been the Bishop of Transfiguration in Novosibirsk since 2002. He was consecrated as a bishop in 1991 and was appointed by Pope John Paul II as apostolic administrator of Siberia.

== Biography ==
Werth was born on October 4, 1952, in Karaganda, Kazakh Soviet Socialist Republic, in the Soviet Union, to a family of Russian Germans that were deported to Kazakhstan. Werth became a member of the Society of Jesus on August 14, 1975.

Joseph Werth began studies for the priesthood clandestinely in Lithuania under the direction of a leader of the underground Jesuits, who also secretly accepted him into the Lithuanian Province of the Society of Jesus. Later he completed his studies at the seminary in Kaunas. In 1984 Father Werth became the first Roman Catholic priest ordained since the 1930s in the Asian part of the former Soviet Union.

He pursued pastoral work at Aktyubinsk, Kazakhstan from 1984 till 1988.

In 1988 he moved to Marx in Russia's Saratov oblast, where two of his own sisters (both Sisters of the Blessed Sacrament) had organized about thirty Catholic congregations among the thousands of ethnic Germans who, following the death of Stalin, had returned to the area of the former Volga German Republic. He served there until 1991.

=== Bishop ===
Named as the Latin Church Apostolic Administrator of Siberia—a see that encompassed 4.2 million square miles or more than 10 million km² (10.3 percent of all the land on earth) and extends through nine of the world's twenty four time zones—by Pope John Paul II on April 13, 1991, Werth initially had only two Ukrainian-born priests to help him minister to an estimated 500,000 Catholics. He has since assembled over 100 priests, nuns and lay missionaries from 18 different countries, mostly from Poland, Germany, and Slovakia, but also Nicaragua, Lebanon, India, Argentina, Korea, and other countries. At least fourteen are from the United States.

The Apostolic Administration of Siberia was divided in 1999 into the Apostolic Administrations of Eastern and of Western Siberia, and the Apostolic Administration of Western Siberia was elevated in 2002 to the rank of a diocese, the Diocese of Transfiguration in Novosibirsk. The center of his diocese is at Novosibirsk, the capital of Siberia, where the cathedral stands. He has sent church workers to the largest cities of Siberia, as well as many towns with sizeable Catholic populations.

In December 2004, the Congregation for the Eastern Churches appointed him as Ordinary for Catholics of the Byzantine rite in the Russian Federation—that is, for Catholics who use the same liturgical rite as the Russian Orthodox Church (Russian Greek Catholic Church), as well as for immigrants from Ukraine, practicing the rite of the Ukrainian Greek Catholic Church.

Bishop Werth is fluent in Russian, German, and Lithuanian.

== Family ==
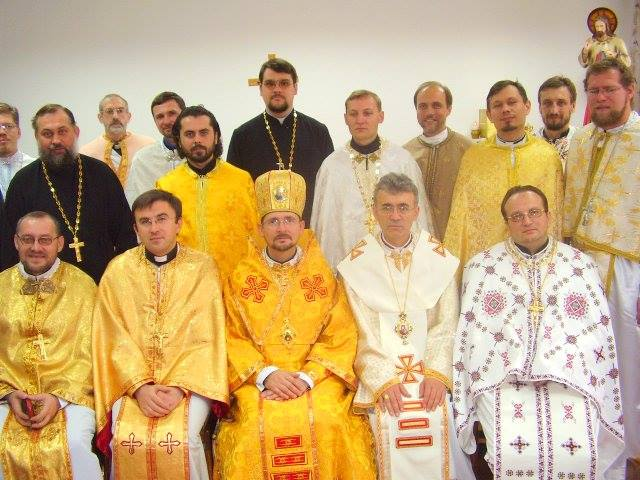
Russian Greek Catholic clergy in 2006. Bishop Joseph Werth is second from the right, first row

The Bishop's paternal grandfather was Joseph Werth, who was born in 1871 at Schoenchen , Russian Empire and deported as a kulak to Kazakhstan in 1929 (with his wife and children). He died in 1951. The Bishop's paternal grandmother was Paulina Demund (b. 1881, Schoenchen - d. 1933). The Bishop's maternal grandfather was Dominic Hoerner (born near Odesa, Ukraine), who was deported around 1931 to Kazakhstan with his family. Joseph and Paulina Werth (and their son Johannes) were part of a trainload of 30000 ethnic Germans gathered up during the collectivization and dumped in the middle of the Kazakhstan steppe in the middle of winter of 1929.

Those who survived did so by digging holes in the earth. By the time the next load arrived, 12,000 had died. This area is now the city of Karaganda, where on October 4, 1952, Msgr. Werth was born. He was the second of eleven children born to Johannes Werth (born October 1, 1923, in Schoenchen, Russian Empire - died November 18, 1995, in Ilbenstadt, near Frankfurt, Germany) and Maria Hoerner Werth (born December 23, 1931, near Odesa, Ukraine).

Catholic Church titles
Titular see established	Titular Bishop of Bulna; 1991–2002	Succeeded by Jozef De Kesel
Administration established	Apostolic Administrator of Novosibirsk; 1991–1999	Administration disestablished
Administration established	Apostolic Administrator of Western Siberia; 1999–2002	Administration disestablished
Preceded by Tadeusz Kondrusiewicz	Chairman of the Conference of Catholic Bishops of the Russian Federation; 2005–2011	Succeeded by Paolo Pezzi
See established	Bishop of Transfiguration at Novosibirsk; 2002–present	Incumbent
Ordinariate established	Ordinary for Catholics of the Byzantine Rite in Russia; 2004–present	Incumbent
