= Sergei Butenko =

Russian footballer

Personal information
- Full name: Sergei Aleksandrovich Butenko
- Date of birth: 2 December 1960 (age 65)
- Place of birth: Novoshakhtinsk, Rostov Oblast, Russian SFSR
- Positions: Midfielder; forward

Senior career*
| Years | Team | Apps | (Gls) |
| 1981 | FC Zorya Voroshilovgrad | 9 | (0) |
| 1982 | FC Tsement Novorossiysk | 27 | (7) |
| 1984 | FC SKA Rostov-on-Don | | |
| 1984–1985 | FC Atommash Volgodonsk | 59 | (25) |
| 1988–1989 | FC Tsement Novorossiysk | 37 | (10) |
| 1989 | FC Volga Kalinin | 16 | (0) |
| 1989 | FC Druzhba Maykop | 9 | (0) |
| 1990 | FC Volgar Astrakhan | 4 | (0) |
| 1991–1992 | FC Gekris Novorossiysk | 33 | (2) |

Managerial career
- 1993–1995: FC Chernomorets Novorossiysk (assistant)
- 1995: FC Chernomorets Novorossiysk (caretaker)
- 1998: FC Chernomorets Novorossiysk (assistant)
- 1998–1999: FC Chernomorets Novorossiysk
- 2000: FC Nosta Novotroitsk
- 2001–2002: FC Pakhtakor Tashkent
- 2002: FC Lada Togliatti (assistant)
- 2003: FC Rostov (assistant)
- 2003: FC Rostov (caretaker)
- 2004: FC Baltika Kaliningrad
- 2008: TP-47
- 2009: FC Rostov (reserves)
- 2010–2015: FC Taganrog
- 2015: FC Druzhba Maykop
- 2015–2016: FC Druzhba Maykop (assistant)
- * Club domestic league appearances and goals

Sergei Aleksandrovich Butenko (Russian: Серге́й Александрович Бутенко; born 2 December 1960) is a Russian professional football coach and a former player.
