= Tomasz Bohdanowicz-Dworzecki =

Polish architect (1859–1920)

- Фома Дворжецкий-Богданович
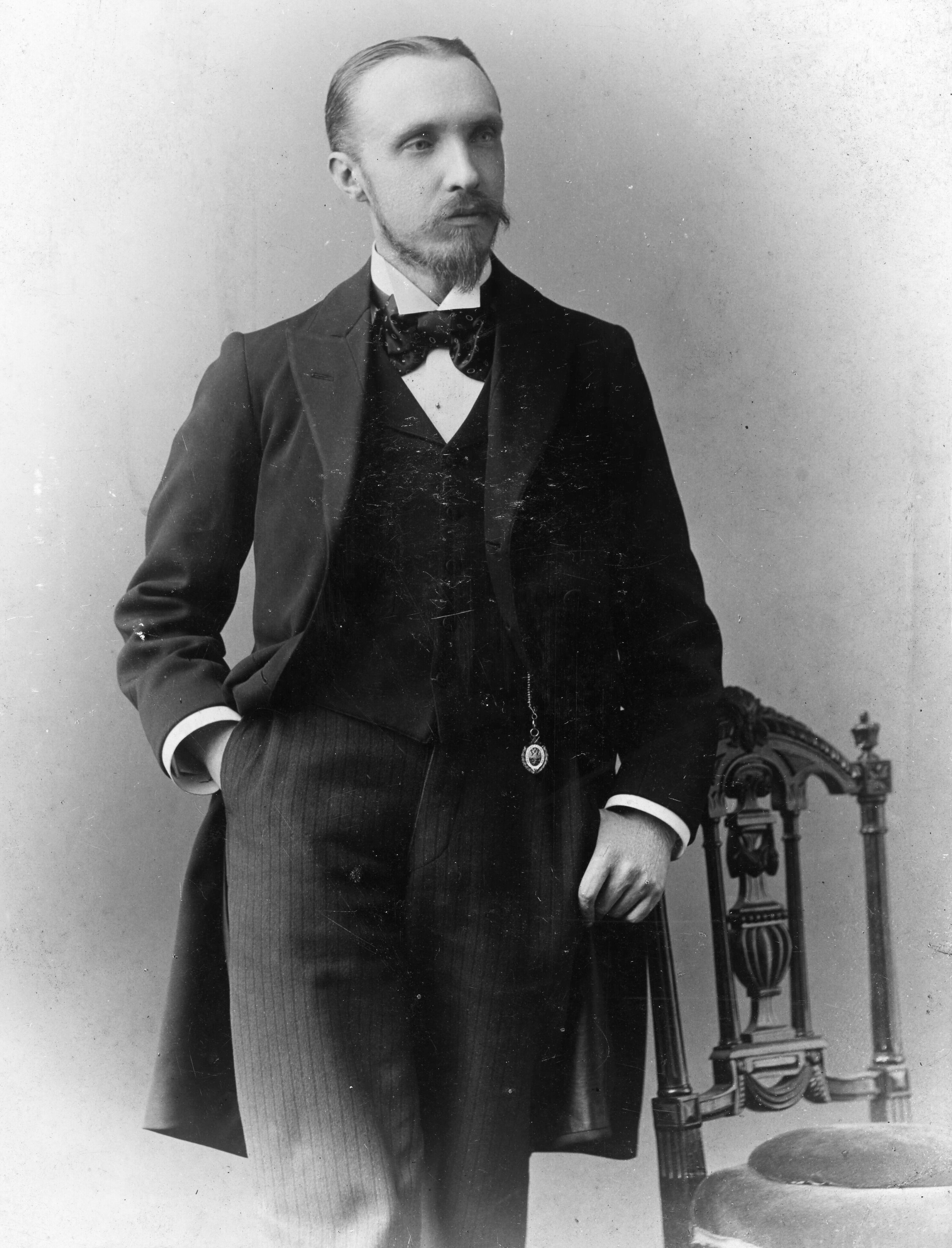
- Bohdanowicz-Dworzecki in 1898
- Born: 1859; Vitebsk, Russian Empire
- Died: April 1920 (aged 60–61); Moscow, Russia
- Education: Member Academy of Arts (1890)
- Known for: Architecture
- Awards: Big Gold Medal of the Imperial Academy of Arts (1885)

Tomasz Bohdanowicz-Dworzecki (Russian: Фома Осипович Дворжецкий-Богданович, romanized: Foma Osipovich Dvorzhetsky-Bogdanovich; 1859 – April 1920) was a Polish architect active in Moscow.

== Biography ==
He was born in 1859 into a family of Polish nobility in Vitebsk, Russian Empire (present-day Belarus). Bohdanowicz-Dworzecki graduated from the Academy of Fine Arts in Saint Petersburg.

From 1893, he was a professor at the Moscow School of Painting, Sculpture and Architecture. He worked there with Stanislaw Nowakowski.

Starting in 1899, Bohdanowicz-Dworzecki was a member of the construction of the board of Moscow and designed several churches in the Gothic style in many cities of Russia, in particular the Cathedral of the Immaculate Conception of the Holy Virgin Mary, as well as several in the Byzantine style.

He died in Moscow in April 1920.
