= Conference of Catholic Bishops of Russia =

Assembly of Catholic bishops

The Conference of Catholic Bishops of Russia (Note: Russian: Конфере́нция католи́ческих епи́скопов Росси́и (ККЕР)) is a collective body of the national church and the administration of the Catholic Church in Russia. Established and approved on March 2, 1999.

== Plenary ==
Plenary sessions of the Conference held twice a year.

== Chairmen ==
Chairman may be elected one of the bishops. The President is elected for a term of 3 years. Hold the post can be no more than two consecutive terms.

Archbishop Tadeusz Kondrusiewicz, from 1999 to 2005

Bishop Joseph Werth, from 2005 to 2011

Archbishop Paolo Pezzi from 2011 to 2017

Bishop Clemens Pickel since 2017

== Composition ==
The structure consists of the four dioceses bishops in the territory of Russia, and the Secretary General of the Conference. At present, their members include:

- Archbishop Paolo Pezzi; Chairman;
- Bishop Joseph Werth, vice-chairman
- Bishop Clemens Pickel,
- Bishop Cyryl Klimowicz;
- Auxiliary Bishop Nicolai Dubinin
- Auxiliary Bishop Stephan Lipke, Secretary-General

== Structure ==
The Liturgical Commission

Commission on the Laity, and youth movements

Catechetical Commission

The Commission for Cooperation with public authorities

Commission for the Family

The Commission for pastoral activities and vocations

The Commission for inter-Christian and interreligious dialogue and dialogue with non-believers

Commission on social and charitable activities

== Catholic martyrs of Russia ==
On January 30, 2002, the Conference of Catholic Bishops of Russia adopted a program of "Catholic martyrs of Russia", in which are studies of life and death of the Servants of God - candidates for the promotion to beatified (beatification).

== See also ==
- Catholic Church in Russia
- Episcopal conference
