= Cathedral of the Immaculate Conception (Moscow) =

Neo-Gothic Catholic cathedral in Moscow, Russia

Cathedral of the Immaculate Conception of the Holy Virgin Mary Собор Непорочного Зачатия Пресвятой Девы Марии
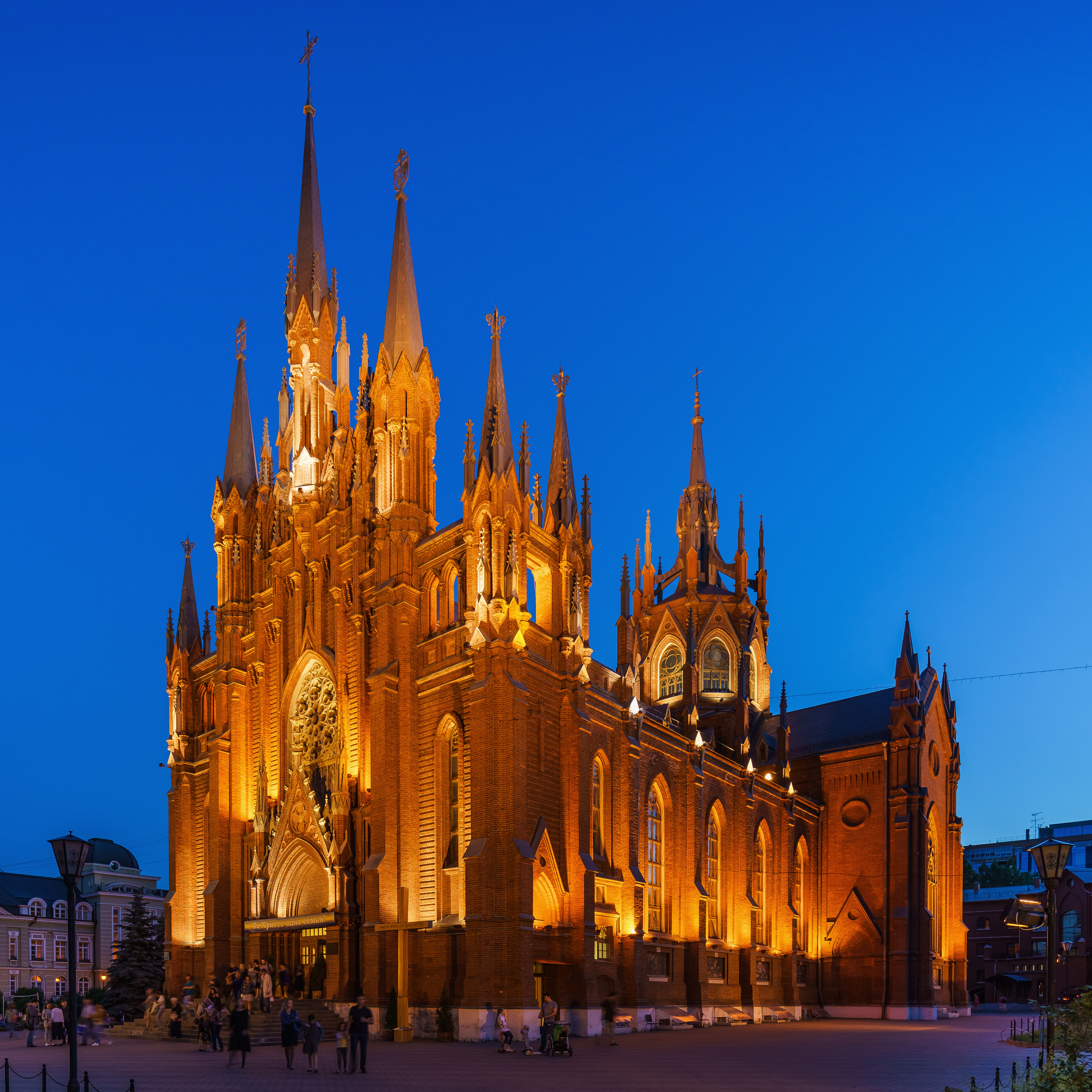
- Cathedral of the Immaculate Conception of the Holy Virgin Mary; Собор Непорочного Зачатия Пресвятой Девы Марии
- 55°46′02″N 37°34′16″E
- Location: Moscow
- Country: Russia
- Denomination: Catholic

History
- Status: Cathedral
- Founded: 21 December 1911
- Events: Reconstructed by the Soviets for civil purposes, 1956

Architecture
- Functional status: Active
- Architect: Tomasz Bohdanowicz-Dworzecki
- Style: Gothic revival

Administration
- Archdiocese: Roman Catholic Archdiocese of Moscow
- Parish: Peter and Paul parish

Clergy
- Archbishop: Sede Vacante

The Cathedral of the Immaculate Conception of the Holy Virgin Mary is a neo-Gothic Catholic church in the center of Moscow, Russia. It serves as the cathedral of the Archdiocese of Moscow. Located in the Central Administrative Okrug, it is one of three Catholic churches in Moscow and the largest in Russia.

The construction of the cathedral was approved in 1894 by the Ministry of Internal Affairs of the Russian Empire. Groundbreaking was in 1899; construction work began in 1901 and was completed ten years later. Three-aisled and built from red brick, the cathedral is based on a design by architect Tomasz Bohdanowicz-Dworzecki. The style was influenced by Westminster Abbey and Milan Cathedral. With the help of funds from Catholic parishes in Russia and its neighbouring states, the church was consecrated as a chapel for Moscow's Polish parish in 1911. In the aftermath of the Russian Revolution in 1917, the Provisional Government was overthrown by the Bolsheviks and Russia eventually became part of the Soviet Union in 1922. Because the promotion of state atheism was a part of Marxist–Leninist ideology, the government ordered many churches closed; the cathedral was closed in 1938. During World War II, it was threatened with demolition, and was used after the war for civil purposes, as a warehouse and then a hostel. Following the fall of communism in 1991, it returned to being a church in 1996. In 2002 it was elevated to the status of cathedral. Following an extensive and costly programme of reconstruction and refurbishment, the cathedral was reconsecrated in 2005.

In the 21st century, after 58 years of non-religious use, the cathedral is once again the setting for regular liturgical celebrations in multiple languages—Russian, Polish, Korean, English, French, Spanish, Armenian and Latin—as well as benefit concerts featuring organ and church music. Its organ, the third since the cathedral's construction, was donated by the Basel Münster. The cathedral is listed as a heritage building in the Russian Federation, and is a protected monument.

== History ==
=== First construction period ===
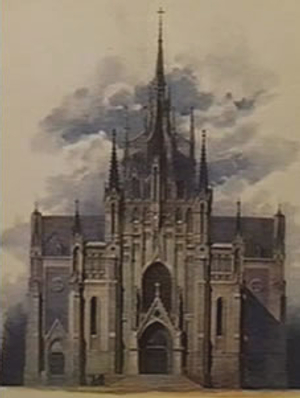
The planned design by architect Tomasz Bohdanowicz-Dworzecki

At the end of the 19th century, only two Catholic churches existed in Moscow: the Saint Louis des Français church for the French population and the St. Peter and Paul church for the Polish parishioners. As the congregation for the Polish church had increased to around 30,000 members, the existing buildings were too small. Following the submission of a petition to the Governor-General of Moscow, the local council voted for a new church in 1894. Construction of a new church was permitted with several conditions, including two pertinent to the building site: the structure was to be built away from the old city centre, and was not to be located in the vicinity of any Orthodox sacred sites.

Bearing in mind the council's requirements, on 16 May 1895 the parish purchased a 10 hectare (22 acre) site on Malaya Gruzinskaya Street, then located on the city outskirts and surrounded by fields and vegetable gardens. Today, the site is in the Central Administrative Okrug, outside of the Garden Ring road defining the old walled city, just beyond the Moscow Metro's Koltsevaya Line, and is surrounded by 20th century urban development. The purchase of the land was funded by donations, and cost 10,000 rubles in gold (roughly US$7,200,000 as of 2012). The purchase agreement and a full list of donations are today kept in the city archives of Moscow and St. Petersburg.

A further condition imposed by the city read as follows: "In the light of the two existing Roman Catholic churches, the future church shall be larger, with a cross on the gable, but without spires and exterior sculpture". The plans for the building were produced by a Russian architect of Polish descent, Tomasz Bohdanowicz-Dworzecki. Although his plan did not follow the council's latter condition, it was accepted. The plan provided seating for up to 5,000 worshippers. Groundbreaking was in 1899, and construction took place from 1901 to 1911. The construction cost was 290,000 roubles in gold (roughly US$207,000,000 as of 2012), much of which was donated by members of the Polish parish of Moscow. More funding came from Catholic parishes throughout Russia, Poland and Belarus.

The church was consecrated on 21 December 1911 as the "Cathedral of the Immaculate Conception of the Holy Virgin Mary". It soon obtained the status of a chapel in the Peter and Paul parish. The consecration received extensive coverage in the Russian and Polish press. The Moscow newspaper Russkoye Slovo wrote:

In the filthy, wretched Malaya Gruzinskaya (Little Georgian) Street, forsaken by God and the city, there rose the wonderful, highly artistic solidity of the new Roman Catholic church, dedicated to the Immaculate Conception of Holy Virgin Mary. Tremendous in magnitude and height, ... with a plenty of conning turrets and towers with crosses. The new cathedral makes a deep impression ... [Every detail] looks impressive and eminent: Not the slightest stylistic flaw could be seen or detected.

From 1911 to 1917, money was collected for interior furnishings, which were relatively sparse apart from the impressive main altar. (These original furnishings remained until the 1930s.) Parts of the draft plan were abandoned: the floor was not constructed from marble as intended, but poured from plain concrete; outside there were no pinnacles on the façade. Writings vary on when the pinnacles were built: some claim they were built in 1923, but others argue that they were not completed until the renovation of the cathedral in 1999. Observers that argue for an earlier construction date state that they were damaged during World War II and left dismantled for some time.

=== Closure and conversions ===
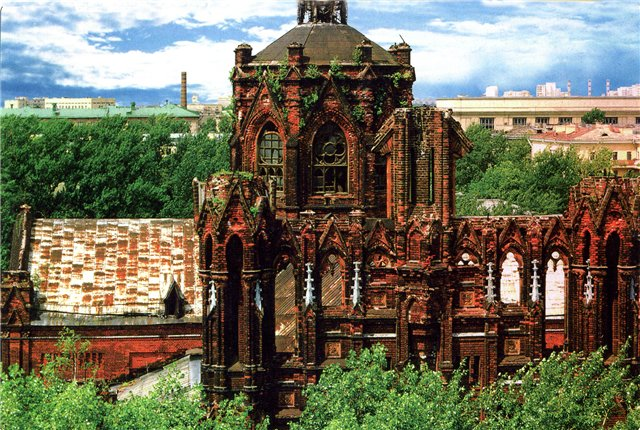
The dilapidated church, c. 1980

In the aftermath of the Russian Revolution in 1917, the Provisional Government was overthrown by the Bolsheviks, and Russia became part of the new Soviet Union. As the promotion of state atheism was a part of Marxist–Leninist ideology, the Soviet government ordered many churches closed. The Peter and Paul parish was formally dissolved by the communist government in 1929, and offering the Mass was forbidden. The church lost much of its surrounding gardens in 1935—a school was built there the following year—and the church was finally closed on 30 July 1938 (the St. Peter and Paul Church, Moscow had met the same fate nine days earlier). The church was plundered after its closure, and many items, including the main altar and the organ, were lost. The church was used for several months as a vegetable store, and was then reconstructed as a hostel and its interior divided into four floors.

The main tower's spire was removed during the Battle of Moscow to prevent the Luftwaffe from using it as a landmark. Shortly after the war ended in 1945, sections of the gardens were annexed for the building of an apartment block. A fire in 1956 caused the collapse of the lantern over the principal tower's dome. Existing tenants were slowly rehoused, and members of the Mosspetspromproyekt (Russian: Мосспецпромпроект) research institute took possession of the former church. The research institute dealt primarily with project drawings for industrial facilities, but also designed the Olympic cauldron used at Lenin Stadium for the 1980 Summer Games.

During the 1960s and 1970s, the building's exterior became increasingly dilapidated; among those concerned about the church's deterioration was Russian bard Vladimir Vysotsky, who lived in a house across the street. In the late 1970s the city considered renovating the building, possibly to use as a concert hall for organ recitals, or as a general cultural administration centre. These projects were never carried out due to resistance from the research institute.

=== Return to religious use ===
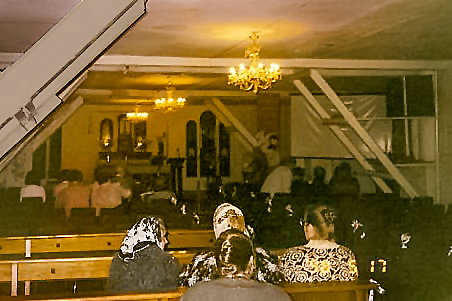
Congregants praying in the temporarily adapted church, c. 1993

The glasnost (openness) policy, introduced during the rule of Mikhail Gorbachev, played a major role in developing religious freedom in the Soviet Union. Consequently, in 1989, a group of Moscow Catholics and the cultural association "The Polish House" (Russian: Дом Польский), suggested that the building should again be used for religious purposes. Following the city's assent, the first Mass at the site in 60 years was celebrated on the church stairs during the feast of the Immaculate Conception on 8 December 1990. The Mass was celebrated by the Polish priest Tadeusz Pikus, who later became an auxiliary bishop for the Archdiocese of Warsaw.

In January 1990, a group of Catholics in Moscow formally founded the parish of the Immaculate Conception of the Holy Virgin Mary. On 13 April 1991 Pope John Paul II promulgated the encyclical Providi quae establishing the "Apostolic administration for European Russia". Its apostolic administrator, Tadeusz Kondrusiewicz, issued a decree for the reconstruction of the church on 21 April 1991. With the city's permission, on the Polish National Day (3 May) a second Mass was held, again on the stairs. The constitution of the parish was officially acknowledged on 31 May by the department of justice of the city council. Meanwhile, parts of the church were subleased by Mosspetspromproyekt to various companies.

From 7 June 1991, Masses were celebrated each Sunday in the churchyard—the institute still occupied the building. On 15 July 1991, Father Josef Sanewski, a member of the Salesians of Don Bosco, was appointed the new parish priest. Religious education had been given regularly under the direction of the Salesian Sisters since 29 November 1991. At the same time, the first charities were founded for nursing and aid to the poor. The vice-mayor of Moscow, Yury Luzhkov, signed a decree in favour of the Church on 1 February 1992 ordering the institute to vacate the property by 1994. Parish members entered the building on 2 July 1992, and occupied the institute's workshop. Moscow City Council agreed to allow the church to occupy the space, which was subsequently walled off from the remainder of the building. There, in the former workshop, Mass was celebrated regularly.

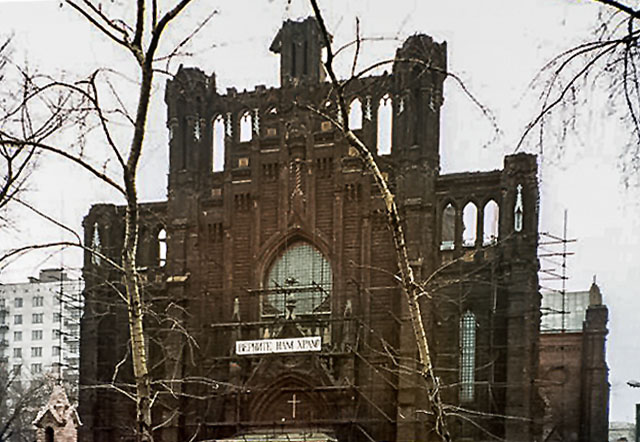
The building before the renovation (mid-1990s). The banner reads: "Give us back the church!" (Верните нам храм!)

The dividing wall was removed by parish members on 7 March 1995, while others started clearing the truss. The institute called the police, OMON, for help. The following day, more conflict with the police occurred and several parish members, among them a nun, were injured. Others were arrested, including a priest and a seminarian, but were released the next day. After these events, the Apostolic Administrator, Tadeusz Kondrusiewicz, wrote an open letter to the Russian president, Boris Yeltsin, on 9 March 1995, requesting his intervention: "It seems that persecution of the church was history. Is that the case? I can't remember seeing a priest arrested, and I can't remember seeing a nun beaten up."

As a result, Senior Moscow Mayor Yuri Luzhkov, a Yeltsin appointee, signed a decision for the removal of the institute. The decision, dated 7 March 1995, ordered the institute's departure by 1996. Simultaneously, the institute wrote to Luzhkov describing the earlier events from their perspective, and requested compensation for loss of the building. In a meeting with the Polish ambassador, Stanisław Ciosek, on 15 March 1995, the acting mayor of Moscow, Alexander Musykantski, assured him that the return of the church would be complete by the end of the year.

On 19 March 1995, a Mass was celebrated in the reclaimed part of the church under the direction of Papal Nuncio John Bukovsky, who delivered Pope John Paul II's blessing to the parish. In a new decision dated 2 November 1995, Luzhkov ordered Mosspetspromproyekt to leave the building by the end of the year at the latest. When the order was still not implemented, parish members entered the institute on 2 January 1996 and began the removal. Institute director Evgeny Afanasyev called the police once again, but on this occasion, they declined to intervene. Subsequently, the institute director asked the parish priest for a final extension of the removal date by two weeks—Mosspetspromproyekt vacated the building on 13 January 1996. On 2 February 1996, the Archdiocese of Mother of God at Moscow obtained official permission to use the church indefinitely.

=== Restoration and reconsecration ===
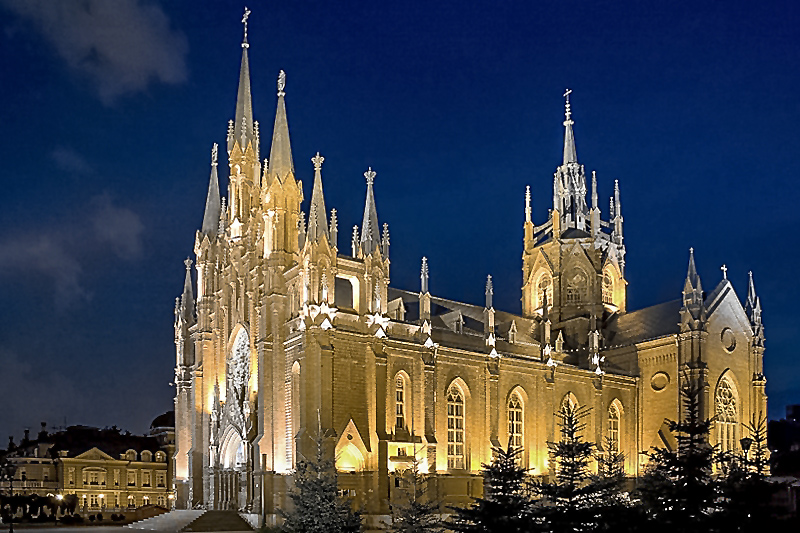
The restored cathedral at night. The exterior lighting was installed at the end of 2005.

In the early 1990s, plans were made by the Office for Monument Protection to restore the church by 1997, the 850th anniversary of Moscow's foundation. This proposal was not implemented because of the dispute over occupancy. However, in 1995, the city determined that the parish would be responsible for restoration costs. A commission was founded for the planned restoration, chaired by parish priest Josef Sanevski, Russian historian Stanislav Durnin, and Polish building contractor and politician Grzegorz Tuderek.

From 1996 to 1999, the church was restored with the help of sponsors EnergoPol, a Polish company, and Renovabis, a German association for Catholic churches. The Russian government provided funds towards the conclusion of the project. Reconstruction took place initially under the direction of Polish companies PKZ and Budimex, who completely restored the façade and roof. From September 1998, Father Andrzey Stetskevich and Jan Tajchman, architect and restorer from Toruń, Poland, jointly oversaw the work; they had previously headed the restoration of the Catholic Assumption Cathedral in St. Petersburg. (Stetskevich later rose to become vicar general of the Catholic Archdiocese of Moscow.) The interior fittings and the new altar were built by Ukrainian, Belarusian and Russian experts. Companies in Moscow carried out all the internal and external marble work. The church furnishings were produced, under the direction of Vladimir Mukhin, by students from the St. Petersburg renovating school. Stained glass for the façade's rose window were made in Toruń, other windows were produced by Tolotschko, a Belarusian company from Hrodna. The Cathedral of the Immaculate Conception was ceremonially reopened on 12 December 1999 and was reconsecrated by the Cardinal Secretary of State of the Roman Curia, Angelo Sodano. The cathedral incorporates a library, the editorial office of the Russian Catholic magazine The Catholic Messenger—The Light of the Gospel (Russian: Католический вестник — Свет Евангелия) as well as the local office for the Caritas charity.

== Architecture and facilities ==
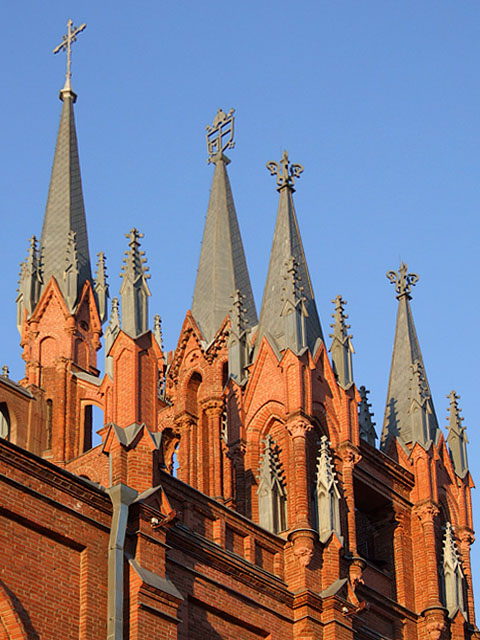
Close-up of the pinnacles. The pinnacle in the middle of the picture shows John Paul II's crest.

The cathedral, built in a neo-Gothic style, is a cruciform pseudo-basilica with three naves and an apse. It was constructed entirely from red brick, and was not rendered externally. The five-bay main aisle extends for 65 metres (213 ft), each with lateral arms 13 metres (43 ft) long. The octagonal lantern tower above the crossing is 30 metres (98 ft) high. The façade is based on the design of Westminster Abbey, and the tower loosely on that of Milan Cathedral. Typically for old-style church buildings, each side aisle is strengthened by five buttresses, the ten together symbolising the Ten Commandments. Crosses were erected, as part of the renovation, surmounting each principal tower; the central façade pinnacle and two other façade pinnacles feature the crests of John Paul II and archbishop Tadeusz Kondrusiewicz.

The first ten steps to the portal symbolise the Commandments, the eleventh symbolises Jesus Christ. The portal symbolises Heaven's gate, reached by obeying the Commandments and the teachings of Jesus. The portal is surrounded by columns and crowned by a wimperg, the gable spire of which is formed as a finial. The wimperg is decorated with a relief ornament, in the centre of which is a golden monogram "VMIC" (Virgo Maria Immaculata Concepta, Latin for "Virgin Mary, conceived unblemished"). The original architectural design provided a Star of David instead of the monogram, a reference to the Jewish faith of the Virgin Mary. Above the wimperg is a 3-metre (9.8 ft) tall rose window, built from a light-coloured, translucent stone.

=== Interior ===
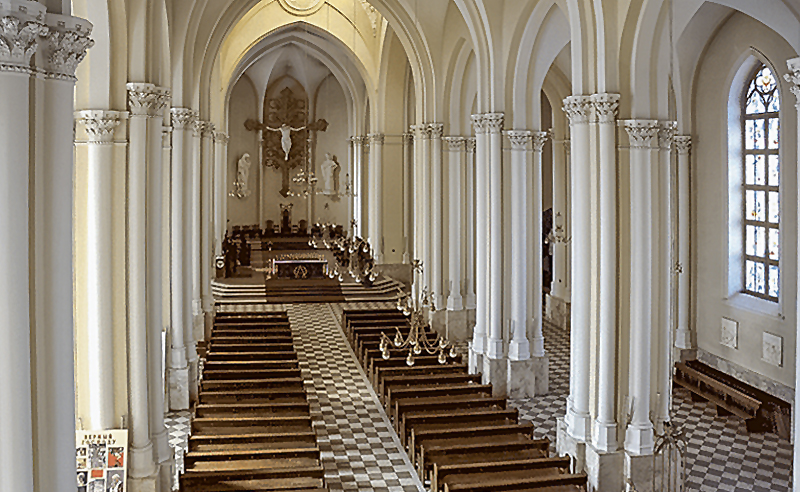
The interior of the cathedral, viewed from the organ loft

On each side on the entry of the cathedral is a stone crucifix and a holy water font. High on the left side there is a brick from the Lateran Basilica, and on the right side a jubilee 2000 medal. The crypt is accessed through the door in the right wall of the vestibule, then up to the organ matroneum and finally down through the door on the left wall. In the crypt, there is an oratory, as well as Catechism rooms and the office of the Caritas charity.

There are benches in the main aisle and confessionals in the side aisles. The confessionals contained benches until the closure of the church in 1938. After its reconstruction, the left side was reserved for women, and the right for men. Both side aisles are separated from the main aisle by pillar files, consisting of four columns and two half columns. The columns and the roof are painted in white, and the walls in cream. The floor is constructed from light and dark grey marble slabs in a chequered pattern.

Most of the 8.5-metre (28 ft) high stained glass windows have abstract designs. Those in front feature crests of Apostolic Nuncios John Cardinal Burkowski and Francesco Cardinal Colasuonno. The windows in the transept are slightly larger and have a more complex design. The window in the right lateral arm depicts Saint Peter and Saint Andrew, who symbolise the Western and Eastern branches of the Catholic Church. On the window on the opposite side of the left lateral arm is depicted Pope John Paul II, who is gazing at the Marian apparition of Fátima. In the nave, under the windows, are fourteen reliefs depicting the Stations of the Cross.

The entry to the vestry is located at the end of the right side aisle next to the choir; at the end of the left side aisle is the Chapel for Mercy of God. The tabernacle is situated on the chapel's altar. The church's main altar is faced with a dark green marble, and houses relics of Saints Andrew, Zenon of Verona, Gregory of Nyssa, Gregory of Nazianzus, Cosmas, Damian and Anastasia, as well as the Virgin Mary's scarf and a donation from the Diocese of Verona. The ambo—a projection coming out from the soleas—is on the right side of the altar, and is faced with the same marble. Behind the altar, on the wall of the apse, there is a nine-metre high stone crucifix with a three-metre high figure of Christ. Plaster figures depicting the Virgin Mary and John the Baptist by architect Svyatoslav Sakhlebin are located on the left and the right sides (respectively) of the corbels. On the opposite side of the altar and above the cathedral's vestibule is the organ loft, which had originally room for 50 choristers; a large part of it is now occupied by the organ.

=== Organ and bells ===
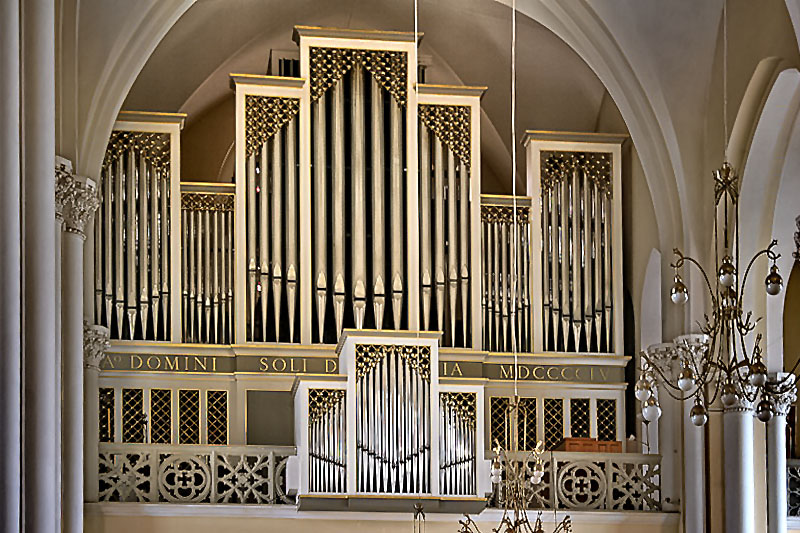
The Kuhn pipe organ in 2007

The present pipe organ is one of the largest in Russia and the third since the church's foundation. The first organ was taken by the state in 1938 and the second, an electronic organ with 60 stops, was installed as part of the renovations in 1999. It was donated by the American charity "Aid to the Church in Russia", headed by priest Marcel Guarnizo, who received consecration as a deacon during the renovation in 1997. The electronic organ was replaced by a pipe organ during 2002–2005.

The cathedral's pipe organ was built in 1955 by Orgelbau Kuhn AG of Männedorf, Switzerland, for the Reformed Evangelical Basel Münster Cathedral in Basel, Switzerland. The Swiss cathedral donated the organ, dismantled it in 2002, and all pipes but without the largest—Nr. 65 principal bass 32', 10 m (32 ft) long—were transferred to Moscow. The pipes were transported wrapped in new garments donated by the people of Basel, which were later distributed to Moscow's poor. The installation of the pipe organ in Moscow was performed by the Orgelbau Schmid company from Kaufbeuren, Germany, headed by Gerhard Schmid, who refused payment for his work. During the work, Schmid was killed in a fall from a scaffold on 9 September 2004; his son Gunnar finished the work.

The original 10-metre, 32' pipe stayed in Switzerland and was built into a new organ in the Münster Cathedral, which belongs to the Swiss Inventory of Cultural Property of National and Regional Significance. This pipe, capable of reproducing a tone of 16.35 Hz, the bass note C_{0} four octaves below middle C, was recreated in Moscow and added to the cathedral's organ in 2009.

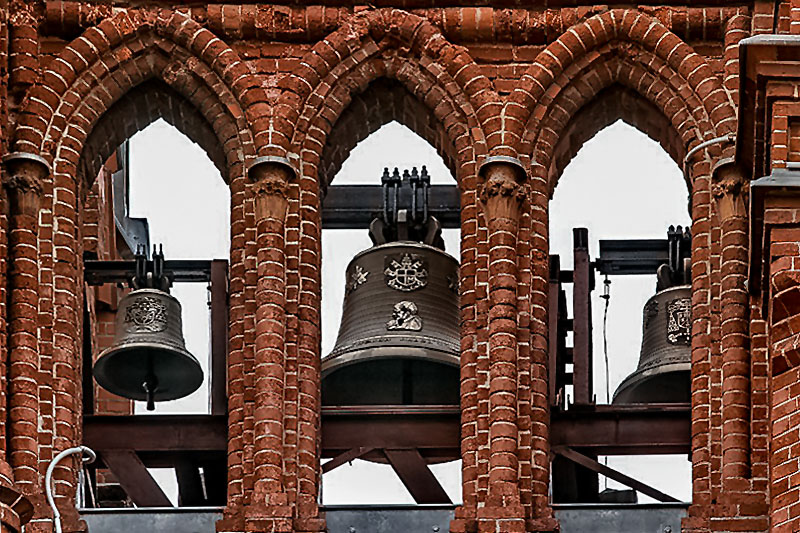
The church bells

The five church bells are located on the cathedral's roof behind a tripartite screen of lancet arches on the left side of the façade. They were poured by the Felczyński bell foundry in Przemyśl, Poland and donated by bishop Wiktor Skworc The bells are electronically activated. The largest weighs 900 kilograms (2,000 lb) and bears the name "Our Lady of Fátima". The other bells are named, from the smallest to the largest: "John Paul II"; "St. Jude", named after the patron saint of archbishop Tadeusz Kondrusiewicz; "Anniversary-2000"; and "St. Victor", named after the patron saint of Bishop Wiktor Skworc.

== 21st century ==
On 11 February 2002, Pope John Paul II created the administration for the Catholic Archdiocese of Moscow and named Apostolic Administrator Tadeusz Kondrusiewicz as archbishop and metropolitan. This decision was criticised by Patriarch Alexy II, who called it "unfriendly", as he believed the Catholic Church saw Russia as a field for missionary activity. At the same time, the Church of the Immaculate Conception acquired the status of cathedral of the archdiocese. In March 2002, members of the cathedral and Catholics from other European cities participated in a rosary led by the Pope via video conference. Since the reopening, many services take place daily in the cathedral. The main liturgical language for Masses is Russian, but services are also held in Polish, English, French, Spanish, Korean, Ecclesiastical Latin (Tridentine Mass) and Classical Armenian (the liturgical language of the Armenian Catholic Church and its Ordinariate for Catholics of Armenian Rite in Eastern Europe).

The re-installed organ—with 74 stops, 4 manuals and 5,563 pipes—was consecrated by Archbishop Kondrusiewicz on 16 January 2005. The mass was followed by the opening concert for the First International Festival for Organ Music. The month-long festival saw several organ concerts in the cathedral. The closing concert was performed by chief organist James Edward Goettsche from St. Peter's Basilica. Organ and church music concerts take place regularly in the cathedral; entry is normally free, except for selected concerts, for which admission is by ticket. A service in remembrance of those killed in the 2010 Polish Air Force Tu-154 crash was held on 12 April 2010.

In the fall of 2016, New York City-based Clarion Choir and its director, Stephen Fox, gave composer Maximilian Steinberg's long banned Christian choral concerto Passion Week its Russian premiere, with performances at Immaculate Conception Cathedral and at Rachmaninov Hall at the Conservatory in Moscow and in St. Petersburg.

== See also ==
- List of churches in Moscow
- Russian Byzantine Catholic Church
- St. Andrew's Anglican Church, Moscow
