= Juozas Tunaitis =

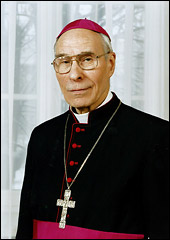
Juozas Tunaitis

Juozas Tunaitis (October 25, 1928, Davainiškis – June 1, 2012, Vilnius), was the Roman Catholic titular bishop of diocese of Sassura (Sousse, Tunisia, 1991–2012) and the auxiliary bishop of the Roman Catholic Archdiocese of Vilnius, Lithuania (1991–2010).

Ordained to the priesthood in 1954, Tunaitis was named bishop in 1991 and retired in 2010.
