= Grzegorz Tuderek =

Polish politician (1938–2024)

Member of the Sejm
- In office 20 October 1997 – 31 December 1997
- In office 21 November 2002 – 18 October 2005

Personal details
- Born: Grzegorz Konstanty Tuderek; 10 March 1938 Księżomierz, Poland
- Died: 25 September 2024 (aged 86)
- Party: SLD
- Education: Higher School of Engineering
- Occupation: Engineer

Grzegorz Konstanty Tuderek (10 March 1938 – 25 September 2024) was a Polish engineer and politician. A member of the Democratic Left Alliance, he served in the Sejm from October to December 1997 and again from 2002 to 2005.

Tuderek died on 25 September 2024, at the age of 86.
