= Paolo Pezzi =

Italian Latin Catholic Bishop of Moscow

The Most Reverend Paolo Pezzi FSCB
- Archbishop Emeritus of Mother of God at Moscow
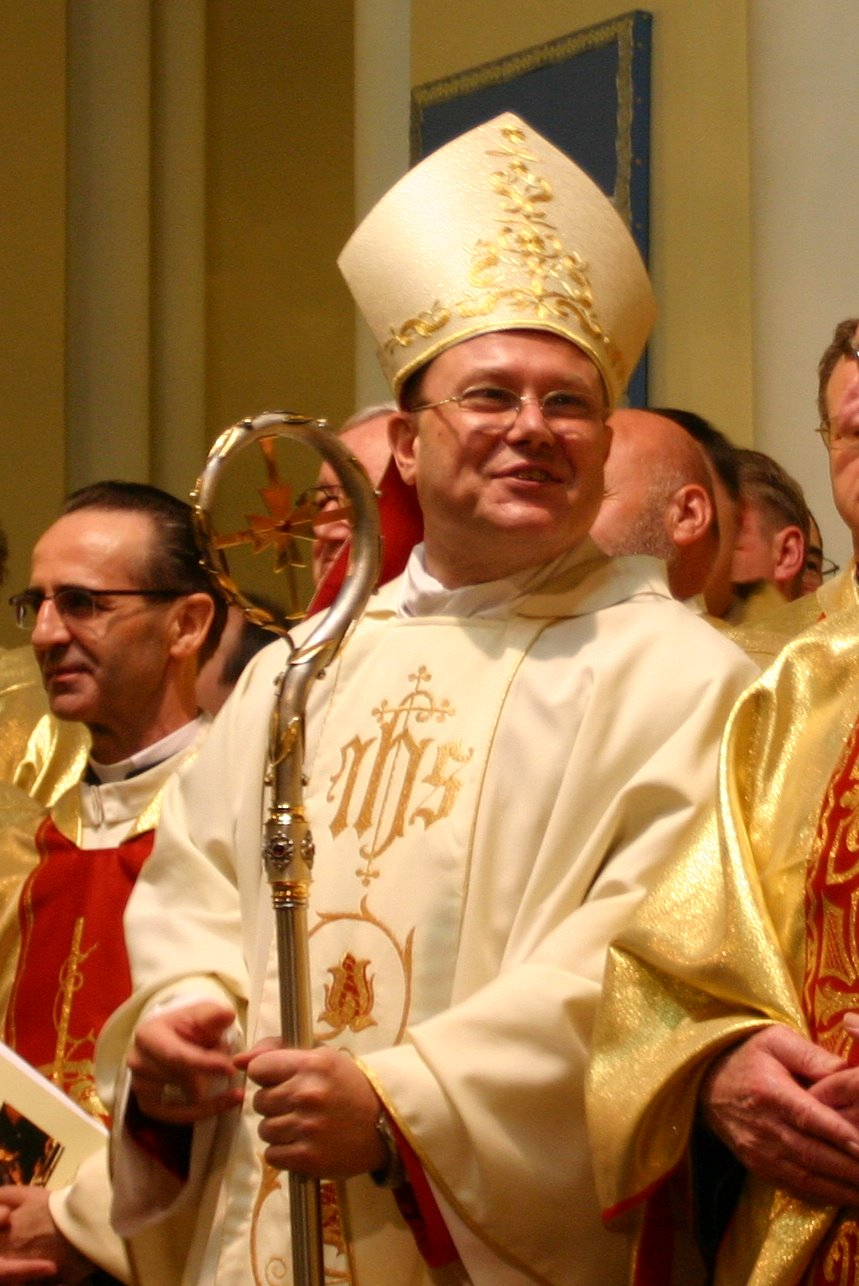
- Church: Catholic Church
- See: Latin Archdiocese of Mother of God at Moscow
- In office: 27 October 2007 – present
- Predecessor: Tadevush Kandrusievich

Orders
- Ordination: 22 December 1990 by Ugo Poletti
- Consecration: 27 October 2007 by Tadevush Kandrusievich, Antonio Mennini and Joseph Werth SJ

Personal details
- Born: 8 August 1960 (age 65) Russi, Italy
- Coat of arms

Styles of Paolo Pezzi FSCB
- Reference style: The Most Reverend
- Spoken style: Your Excellency
- Religious style: Monsignor
- Posthumous style: n/a

Paolo Pezzi, FSCB (Russian: Павел Пецци; born 8 August 1960), also known as Pavel Pezzi, is an Italian Catholic prelate who has served as the Latin Archbishop of Moscow since 2007. He is a member of the Priestly Fraternity of the Missionaries of St. Charles Borromeo.

== Biography ==
=== Early life and ministry ===
Paolo Pezzi was born in Russi, Italy, on 8 August 1960. He studied philosophy and theology at the Pontifical University of St. Thomas Aquinas (Angelicum) in Rome (1985–1990). He was ordained to the priesthood for the Priestly Fraternity of the Missionaries of St.Charles Borromeo in 1990. He subsequently was awarded a Doctorate in Theology (Cattolici in Siberia, le origini, le persecuzioni, l’oggi) by the Pontifical Lateran University. He has worked in Russia since 1993, serving as a professor at several notable universities in Russia including Novosibirsk State University and Russian State University for the Humanities. He was rector of the major seminary of Mary Queen of the Apostles in Saint Petersburg from 2006 to 2007.

Besides his native Italian, he can speak Russian, English, Spanish and Portuguese.

=== Episcopacy ===
On 21 September 2007 Fr. Pezzi was appointed Metropolitan Archbishop of the Archdiocese of Mother of God at Moscow by Pope Benedict XVI. He replaced the first Archbishop of the Archdiocese, Tadevush Kandrusievich. He was consecrated in the Cathedral of the Immaculate Conception in Moscow on 27 October 2007 by Archbishop Kandrusievich, HE Msgr Antonio Mennini, Titular Archbishop of Ferentium and Apostolic nuncio to Russian Federation, and HE Msgr Joseph Werth SJ, Bishop of the Diocese of Transfiguration at Novosibirsk.

On 19 January 2010 he was appointed Grand Prior of Magistral Delegation of Russia of the Order of the Holy Sepulchre.

In 2011 he was granted Russian citizenship, and elected President of the Conference of Catholic Bishops of the Russian Federation where he served for two terms.

In 2012 he was appointed member of the Pontifical Council Cor Unum.

== See also ==
- Roman Catholic Archdiocese of Mother of God at Moscow

Catholic Church titles
Preceded by Tadeusz Kondrusiewicz	Archbishop of Mother of God at Moscow; 2007–present	Incumbent
Preceded by Joseph Werth	Chairman of the Conference of Catholic Bishops of the Russian Federation; 2011–2017	Succeeded by Clemens Pickel
