= Archdiocese of Moscow =

Latin Catholic ecclesiastical jurisdiction in Moscow, Russia

Archdiocese of the Mother of God at Moscow Archidioecesis Moscoviensis Matris Dei Архиепархия Матери Божией в Москве
- Coat of arms

Location
- Country: Russia
- Coordinates: 55°46′02″N 37°34′17″E

Statistics
- Area: 2,629,000 km^{2} (1,015,000 sq mi)
- Population: Total; Catholics: (as of 2013); 58,800,000; 200,000 (0.3%)

Information
- Denomination: Catholic Church
- Sui iuris church: Latin Church
- Rite: Roman Rite
- Cathedral: Cathedral of the Immaculate Conception of the Holy Virgin Mary

Current leadership
- Pope: Leo XIV
- Archbishop: Sede vacante
- Auxiliary Bishops: Nicolai Dubinin, O.F.M.Conv
- Apostolic Administrator: Nicolai Dubinin
- Bishops emeritus: Paolo Pezzi

Map
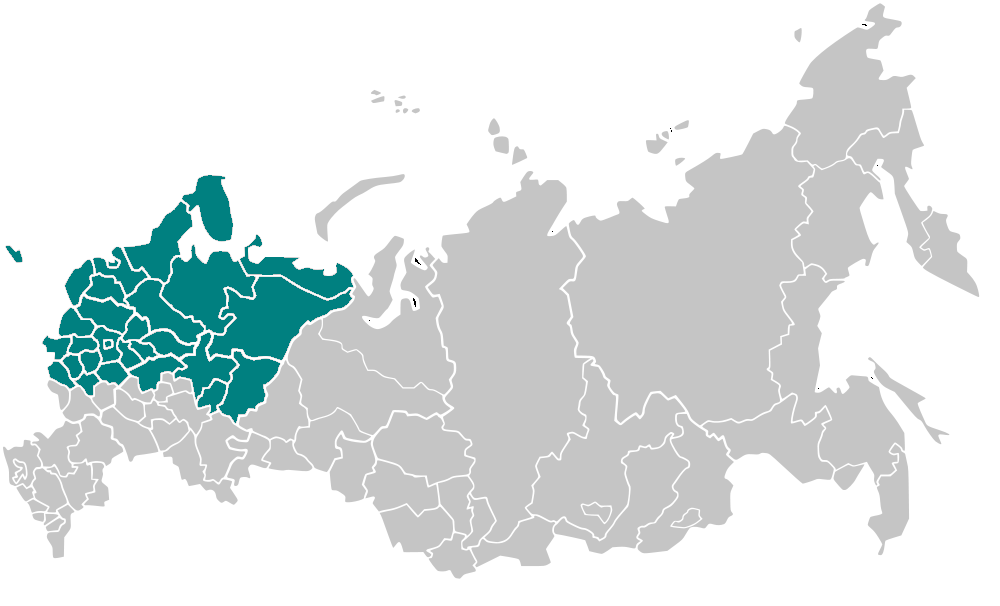

Website
- www.cathmos.ru

The Archdiocese of the Mother of God at Moscow or simply, Archdiocese of Moscow (Latin: Archidioecesis Moscoviensis Matris Dei, Russian: Архиепархия Матери Божией в Москве) is a Latin Church ecclesiastical territory or archdiocese of the Catholic Church located in Moscow, in Russia.

== History ==
- 13 April 1991: Established as Apostolic Administration of European Russia from the Archdiocese of Mogilev and the Diocese of Tiraspol
- 23 November 1999: Territory ceded to the new Apostolic Administration of Southern European Russia, centred in Saratov; remaining territory renamed Apostolic Administration of Northern European Russia
- 11 February 2002: Promoted as Metropolitan Archdiocese of Mother of God at Moscow

== Bishops ==
- Apostolic Administrator of Northern European Russia (Latin Church)
  - Bishop Tadeusz Kondrusiewicz (13 April 1991 – 11 February 2002 see below)
- Archbishops of Mother of God at Moscow
  - Archbishop Tadeusz Kondrusiewicz (see above 11 February 2002 – 21 September 2007), appointed Archbishop of Minsk-Mohilev, Belarus
  - Archbishop Paolo Pezzi, F.S.C.B. (21 September 2007 – 2 May 2026)

=== Auxiliary Bishops ===
- Clemens Pickel (1998–1999), appointed Apostolic Administrator of Southern European Russia {Russia Europea Meridionale}
- Nicolai Dubinin, O.F.M. Conv. (2020–)

== Suffragan dioceses ==
- Saint Clement at Saratov
- Saint Joseph at Irkutsk
- Transfiguration at Novosibirsk

== See also ==
- Cathedral of the Immaculate Conception (Moscow)
- Immaculate Conception Church, Perm
- Immaculate Conception Church, Smolensk
- List of Roman Catholic dioceses in Russia
- Roman Catholicism in Russia
- St. Nicholas' Church, Luga
- St. Peter and St. Paul's Church, Tula
- Transfiguration of the Lord Church, Tver

== Sources ==
- GCatholic.org
- Catholic Hierarchy
