= Jerzy Mazur =

Polish Roman Catholic bishop (born 1953)

Mgr. Jerzy Mazur
- Bishop of Ełk
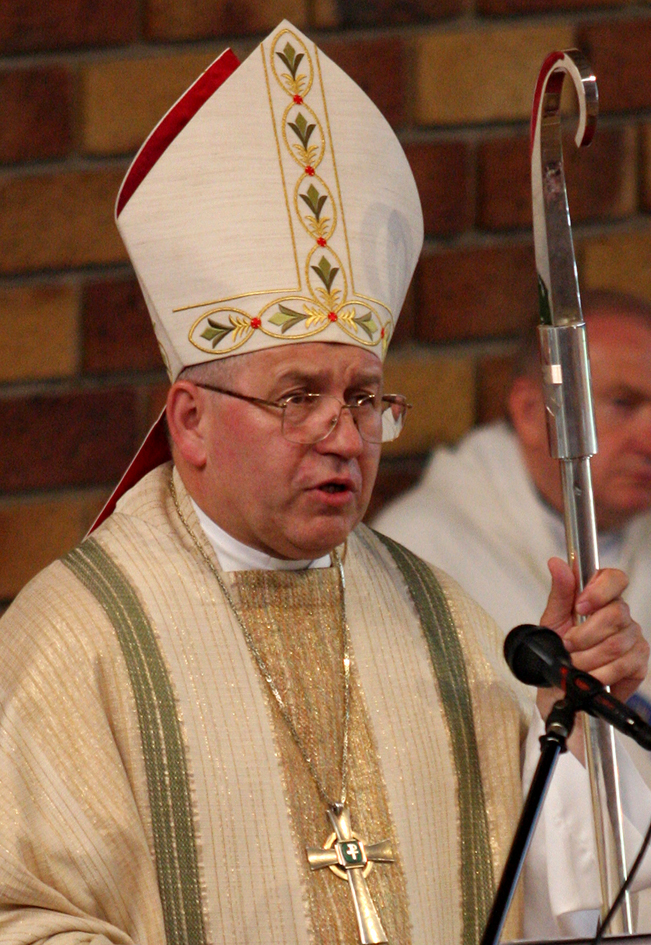
- Mazur in 2009
- Church: Roman Catholic Church
- Archdiocese: Warmia
- In office: 2003 –
- Predecessor: Edward Eugeniusz Samsel
- Previous posts: Auxiliary bishop of Tabunia (1998–2002); Apostolic Administrator of Novosibirsk (1998–1999); Apostolic Administrator of Eastern Siberia (1999–2002); Apostolic Administrator of Yuzhno Sakhalinsk (2000–2003); Bishop of Saint Joseph at Irkutsk (2002–2003)

Orders
- Ordination: 22 April 1979 by Ignacy Tokarczuk
- Consecration: 31 May 1998 by John Bukovsky S.V.D.
- Rank: Bishop

Personal details
- Born: 5 August 1953 (age 72) Hawłowice, Poland
- Motto: Veni, Sancte Spiritus
- Coat of arms

Jerzy Mazur SVD (born 5 August 1953) is a Polish Roman Catholic bishop, being the head of the Roman Catholic Diocese of Ełk since 2003. He was previously a missionary, as well as a bishop in Siberia and the titular bishop of Tabunia.

== Biography ==
=== Early life ===
Mazur was born in the village of Hawłowice. In 1972 he entered the Society of the Divine Word. At the same time, he began studies at the Theological Seminary of the Congregation of the Word of God in Pieniężno. He made his first religious vows in 1974, and his perpetual vows in 1978. He was ordained as a Catholic priest on 22 April 1979 in Pieniężno by the archbishop of Przemyśl, Ignacy Tokarczuk. He obtained his master's degree at the Catholic University of Lublin. From 1980 to 1982 he studied at the Pontifical Gregorian University in Rome, graduating with a BA in missiology.

=== Priestly ministry ===
From 1983 to 1986 Mazur worked as missionary in Ghana. After returning to Poland, he became a prefect in 1986, and in 1987 was appointed as a lecturer of missiology at the Missionary Theological Seminary run the Divine Word Missionaries in Pieniężno. In 1989, he became a provincial counselor of divine world missionaries in Poland. In 1992 he moved to Baranowicze and served as the parish priest of Our Lady of Fatima parish. Moreover, he served as the spiritual father-priest for the Diocese of Pinsk and the Archdiocese of Minsk-Mogilev. From 1994 to 1998 he was the editor of the magazine "Dialog". From 1994 he was the chairman of the Catechetical Committee of the Diocese of Pinsk. He participated in the organization of the Synod of the Archdiocese of Minsk-Mogilev and the Diocese of Pinsk, since 1996 being a member of the organizing commission and secretary of the coordinating commission. In preparation for the Great Jubilee of the Year 2000, he was responsible for ecumenical matters starting in 1997. For the Divine World Missionaries in 1992 Mazur became the district superior, and in 1997 the regional he became the superior of the S.V.D.'s Ural region, covering the territory of Belarus, Russia and Ukraine.

=== Ordination as bishop ===
On 23 March 1998 Pope John Paul II appointed him auxiliary bishop of the apostolic administration of Siberia with the titular see of Tabunia. He was ordained a bishop on 31 May 1998 at the Transfiguration Cathedral in Novosibirsk. He was ordained by Titular Archbishop John Bukovsky S.V.D., the Apostolic Nuncio in Russia, with the co-consecrators being Joseph Werth, the Apostolic Administrator of Siberia, and Julian Gbur, the auxiliary bishop of Lviv Byzantine-Ukrainian rite. Mazur choose the phrase "Veni, Sancte Spiritus" (Come, Holy Spirit) as his bishop's motto.

=== Bishop of Irkutsk ===
On 18 May 1999, he was appointed the apostolic administrator of the newly created apostolic administration of Eastern Siberia, based in Irkutsk. On 11 February 2002, with the elevation of the administration to the rank of a diocese, he was appointed diocesan bishop of the new diocese of St. Joseph in Irkutsk. Thanks to his involvement in talks with state authorities and representatives of the Orthodox Church, it was possible to consecrate the new Immaculate Heart of Mary Cathedral in Irkutsk in 2000. In April 2002, he was arrested at the airport in Moscow on his return trip to Irkutsk and forcibly sent back to Poland. He settled in the house of the S.V.D. in Michałowice, from where he headed the Irkutsk diocese until April 2003.

=== Bishop of Ełk ===
On 17 April 2003, Pope John Paul II installed Mazur as the new bishop of Ełk, succeeding the deceased Edward Samsel. He was installed at the Cathedral of St. Wojciech in Ełk on 9 June 2003.

As Bishop of Ełk, Mazur has been part of the Polish Bishops' Conference. As part of the conference he became the chairman of the team that interacts with the Lithuanian Bishops' Conference and the Commission for Missions. He also became a member of the Charity Commission, and has assumed the position of the chairman of the National Mission Council and became a member of the Supervisory Committee of Caritas Internationalis.
