= Tabunia =

Ancient City

Tabunia, is an ancient city and former bishopric of Roman North Africa, which remains a Latin Catholic titular see.

Mauretania Caesariensis (125 AD)

== History ==
Tabunia was among the many cities of significant importance in the Roman province of Mauretania Caesariensis to become a suffragan diocese of Carthage, in the papal sway.

The seat of the diocese, or cathedra, remains unknown and it is unknown when it ceased to function though it was some time between the Vandal Kingdom and the 7th century Muslim conquest of the Maghreb.

The only historically documented bishop of the diocese was Quintus, who took part in the Council of Carthage (484) called by king Huneric of the Vandal Kingdom, after which he was exiled like most Catholic bishops, unlike their heretical-schismatic Donatist counterparts.

== Titular see ==
The diocese was nominally restored in 1933 as Latin titular bishopric of Tabunia (Latin = Curiate Italian) / Tabunien(sis) (Latin adjective).

It has had the following incumbents, so far of the fitting Episcopal (lowest) rank :

- José Eduardo Alvarez Ramírez, Lazarists (C.M.) (1965.10.07–1969.12.09) as Auxiliary Bishop of Archdiocese of San Salvador (El Salvador) (1965.10.07–1968.11.04); next last Military Vicar of El Salvador (1968.11.04–1986.07.21), also Bishop of San Miguel (El Salvador) (1969.12.09 – 1997.04.10), President of Episcopal Conference of El Salvador (1980–1983), (see) restyled first Military Ordinary of El Salvador (1986.07.21 – died 1987.03.07); died 2000
- Jean Baptiste Bùi Tuần (1975.04.15–1997.12.30) as Coadjutor Bishop of Long Xuyên (Vietnam) (1975.04.15 – 1997.12.30); next succeeded as Bishop of Long Xuyên (1997.12.30–retired 2003.10.02)
- Jerzy Mazur, Divine Word Missionaries (S.V.D.) (1998.03.23–2002.02.11) as Apostolic Administrator of Apostolic Administration of Novosibirsk (Siberia, Russia) (1998.03.23–1999.05.18) and Apostolic Administrator of Apostolic Administration of Eastern Siberia (Russia) (1999.05.18 – 2002.02.11) and Apostolic Administrator of Apostolic Prefecture of Yuzhno Sakhalinsk (Russia) (2000–2003.04.17); later Bishop of Saint Joseph at Irkutsk (Russia) (2002.02.11–2003.04.17), Bishop of Ełk (Poland) (2003.04.17– ...)
- Leon Malyi (2002.05.04 – ...), Auxiliary Bishop of Archdiocese of Lviv (Ukraine) (2002.05.04– ...), no previous prelature.

== See also ==
- List of Catholic dioceses in Algeria

== Sources and external links ==
- GCatholic

=== Bibliography ===
- Pius Bonifacius Gams, Series episcoporum Ecclesiae Catholicae, Leipzig 1931, p. 468
- Stefano Antonio Morcelli, Africa christiana, Volume I, Brescia 1816, p. 295
- François Morenas, Dictionnaire historique-portatif de la géographie Sacrée ancienne et moderne, Paris? (Desaint & Saillant), 1759, p699.
