= Kazimierz Hamerszmit =

Polish Roman Catholic priest (1916–1996)

Servant of God Kazimierz Hamerszmit
- Church: Catholic Church
- Diocese: Ełk
- Appointed: Parish priest of St Alexander's, Suwałki
- Installed: 10 August 1966
- Term ended: 1 July 1986
- Previous posts: Parish priest of St Stanislaus, Dobrzyjałów; Parish priest of St James the Apostle, Bakałarzewo; Parish priest of Saints Peter and Paul the Apostles, Suwałki

Orders
- Ordination: 30 April 1939
- Rank: Priest

Personal details
- Born: Kazimierz Aleksander Hamerszmit; 12 February 1916 Kołaki Kościelne, Government General of Warsaw
- Died: 5 February 1996 (aged 79) Suwałki, Poland
- Buried: Roman Catholic parish cemetery in Suwałki
- Denomination: Roman Catholic

Kazimierz Aleksander Hamerszmit (12 February 1916 – 5 February 1996) was a Polish Roman Catholic priest, author, Nazi concentration camp survivor, and social activist. His cause for beatification was opened in 2008.

== Biography ==
Aleksander Hamerszmit was born on 12 February 1916 in Kołaki Kościelne, into a large family. His parents were Stanisław, a church organist, and Michalina. The day after his birth, he was baptised in the Parish of the Assumption of the Blessed Virgin Mary in Kołaki Kościelne, where he was given the names Kazimierz and Aleksander. His godparents were Father Stanisław Koćmierowski and Katarzyna Hamerszmit. During the Second World War, his mother was a member of the Home Army, using the codename 'Mamusia' (English: 'Mother'). She played an active role in the resistance movement, for which she was awarded two medals, the silver and gold Cross of Merit with Swords in 1943 and 1944.

At the age of six, Hamerszmit started attending the primary school in Kołaki Kościelne, where he studied for four years. On 1 September 1926, his studies at the Tadeusz Kościuszko Grammar School in Łomża begun, and graduated on 25 June 1934. On the 20 of July 1934, he entered the Major Seminary in Łomża, and was a member of the Sodality of Our Lady. After five years at the seminary, he was ordained as a priest on 30 April 1939 by Bishop Stanisław Kostka Łukomski in Łomża Cathedral.

After being ordained a priest, he was sent on 12 June 1939 to St Stanislaus's parish in Dobrzyjałów as Vicar, and then, from 1 September 1939, he served as Parish Priest at St James the Apostle's parish in Bakałarzewo, where he was when the Second World War broke out. On 7 April 1940, he was arrested along with other clergymen by the German Army and subsequently taken to Suwałki, and then on 12 April to the transit camp in Działdowa, next, on 5 May to Sachsenhausen and finally, on 14 December, to the camp in Dachau, where he was assigned the number 22575. He described his time in the camp as follows:

Now they slowly got round to everyone. So there were marches and singing, interspersed with running or the frog-jump. The older ones began to drop out right from the start (…). A few weeks of such exercises reduced us to skeletons (…). On 14 December 1940, we arrived at Dachau. The first snow had already fallen. The march from the railway station to the camp in wooden clogs was torture, because the snow stuck to the wood. When we entered the camp, we were surrounded by emaciated prisoners begging for bread. As we still had some supplies, we handed them out.

From December 1940, he was subjected to human experimentation on resistance to malaria. He was liberated by American soldiers on the 29 of April 1945, but soon afterwards, on the 12 of May, he fell ill with typhus. Following his hospital treatment, he left the camp hospital on the 12 July of that year and subsequently stayed at the Polish centre in Munich. On 5 August 1945, he took up pastoral work at the Polish centre in Nuremberg (July–October 1945), and then moved to Coburg, where he served as a hospital chaplain.

At the end of April 1946, he returned to Poland, to the Diocese of Łomża. On 10 May of that year, he became curate of the parish in Zambrów, and from the 1 of July in the parish in Grajewo. He was then transferred to Ostrołęki, and soon to Augustów. On 12 October 1948, by decision of Bishop Stanisław Kostka Łukomski, he was to be appointed secretary of the Diocesan Curia in Łomża, but he had previously resigned from this post on 4 October, citing health reasons. On 26 May 1952, he was transferred from Ostrołęka to Rutki to replace the parish priest, Father Czesław Dziondziak, who had been arrested earlier, but was soon transferred to Łomża on 4 August, where he served as curate and, at the same time, as notary to the Bishop's Court. On 14 August 1959, he became curate of the parish of St Peter and St Paul the Apostles in Suwałki (where he oversaw the renovation of the church and commissioned the organ), and on 10 August 1966, he was appointed parish priest of St Alexander's Parish in Suwałki, having also served as dean since 23 March 1985. When the 'Kalina' Care Home was established in Suwałki in 1963, he began providing pastoral care there. Between 1970 and 1985, he served as a canon of the Łomża Cathedral Chapter. On 22 November 1975, he was appointed a prelate of His Holiness. From 22 October 1976, he served as confessor at the convent of the Congregation of the Sisters of St Teresa of the Child Jesus in Suwałki, and from 1 October 1985 to 1 March 1987, he was chaplain at the Wacław Zajączkowski Provincial General Hospital in Suwałki. He also served as Regional Chaplain for the Health Service from 23 October 1973.

From November 1980, in collaboration with the curate of St Alexander's Parish, Priest Jerzy Jan Zawadzki, he supported the activities of Solidarity, when the parish became a meeting place for trade union activists. During martial law in Poland, after 13 December 1981, he helped to store underground publications, print leaflets and organise poetry evenings, concerts and lectures. He served as spiritual advisor to those interned at the detention centre in Suwałki. On numerous occasions, he celebrated solemn Masses for the homeland on their behalf, delivering special sermons.

On the 1 of July 1986, Hamerszmit retired. He died 5 February 1996 in Suwałki. He was buried in the crypt in the Roman Catholic parish cemetery in Suwałki, in accordance with the wishes set out in his will.

== Selected works ==
The only publication edited by Edward Anuszkiewicz consists of the camp memoirs of Father Kazimierz Hamerszmit. In addition, Father Wojciech Guzewicz wrote a short article about the parish priest Stanisław Maciątek, based on the memoirs recorded by Father Kazimierz Hamerszmit.

- Kazimierz Hamerszmit, Edward Anuszkiewicz (2002), Na kapłańskiej drodze II: ks. Kazimierz Hamerszmit – numer obozowy w Dachau 22575: wspomnienia, vol. 2, Ełk: Kuria Biskupia Diecezji Ełckiej, ISBN 8391320049, OCLC 838606518
- Wojciech Guzewicz (2007), "Wspomnienia o księdzu Stanisławie Maciątku, proboszczu w Wiżajnach, spisane przez ks. Kazimierza Hamerszmita" (PDF), Studia Ełckie, vol. 9, p. 127–134, ISSN 1896-6896, OCLC 922412197, archived from the original on 1 January 2019

== Beatification ==
On the initiative of the clergy of St Alexander's Parish in Suwałki, who were convinced of the holiness of his life, efforts were made to have him canonised. On 6 March 2008, the Holy See issued a decree known as the Nihil obstat granting permission for the beatification process to begin. Subsequently, in February 2010, the diocesan phase of the process began at the Ełk curia. From then on, he was entitled to the title of Servant of God. Priest Dariusz Broź has been appointed postulator of the cause. On 29 November 2019, the Vatican Dicastery for the Causes of Saints issued a decree confirming the validity of the beatification process at the diocesan level.

== Legacy ==
- In 1996, Suwałki Town Council named one of the streets after him, the one he walked along every day on his way to St Alexander's Church, and in 1999, a memorial room dedicated to his life was established in the town.
- He is the namesake of an occupational therapy workshop for people with disabilities in Filipów and the Caritas soup kitchen in Suwałki.
- He is also a patron of Primary School No. 4 in Suwałki.

== See also ==
- List of Catholic saints
  - List of Polish Catholic saints
- Intercession of saints
