= Diocese of Irkutsk =

Diocese of Irkutsk may refer to the following ecclesiastical jurisdictions with see in Irkutsk, in southern central Siberia :

- Roman Catholic Diocese of Saint Joseph at Irkutsk
- Russian Orthodox Metropolitate of Irkutsk
