= Apostolic Prefecture of Yuzhno Sakhalinsk =

Catholic missionary jurisdiction in Russia

Coordinates: 46.9511°N 142.7473°E

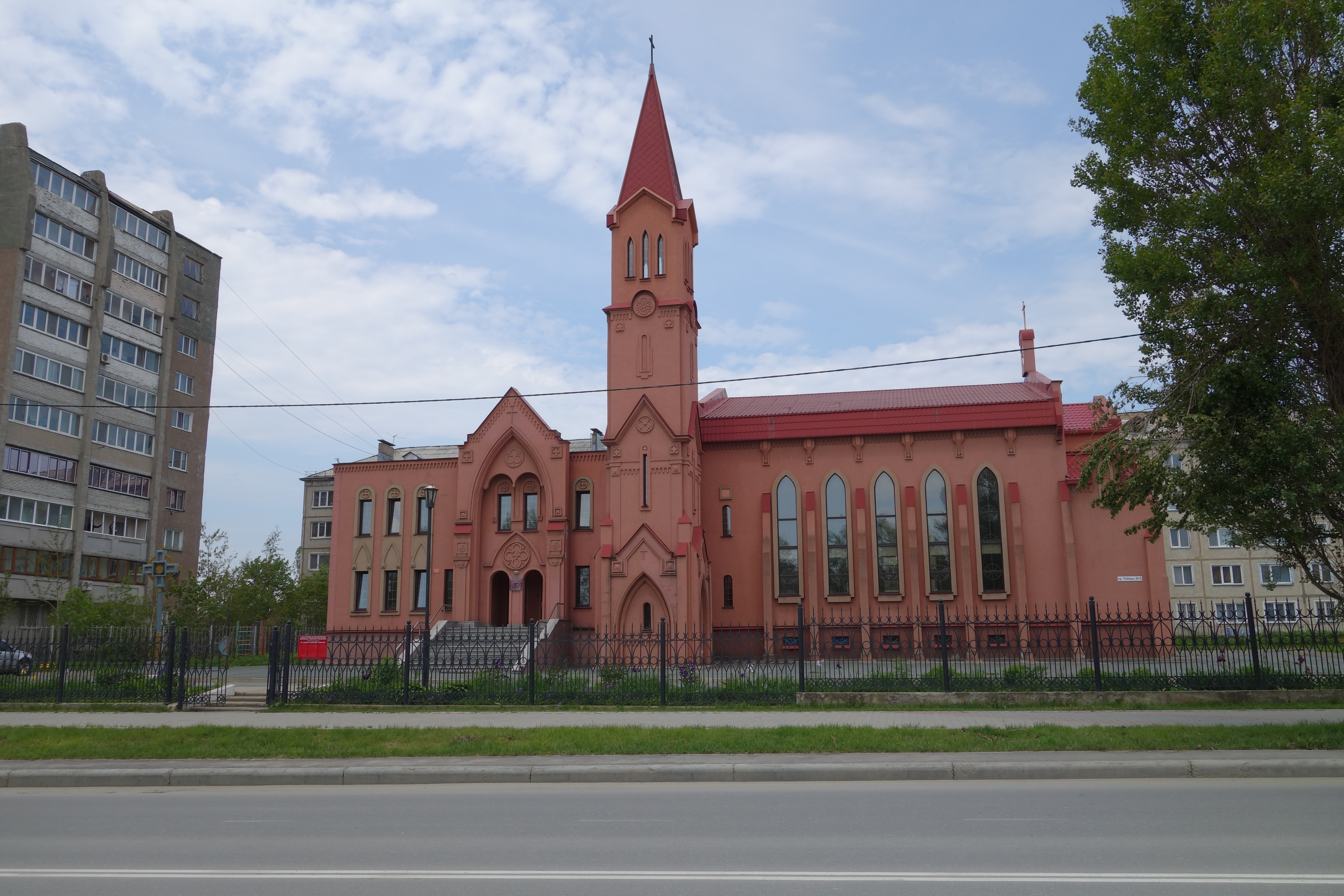
Catholic church in Yuzhno-Sakhalinsk

The Apostolic Prefecture of Yuzhno Sakhalinsk is a Latin Church missionary pre-diocesan jurisdiction on the Russian (ex-Japanese) Far Eastern island Sakhalin.

It is exempt, i.e. directly dependent on the Holy See (not part of any ecclesiastical province) and its Roman Congregation for the Evangelization of Peoples, and remains vacant but under apostolic administration.

Its cathedral episcopal see is the Church of St. James, in Yuzhno-Sakhalinsk.

== History ==
- Established on 1932.07.18 as Mission sui juris of Karafuto (樺太 (日本語) ), on then Japanese territory split off from the Apostolic Vicariate of Sapporo (札幌))
- Promoted on 1938.05.21 as Apostolic Prefecture of Karafuto / 樺太 (日本語)
- Renamed on 2002.04.10 as Apostolic Prefecture of Yuzhno Sakhalinsk
- Most of the time under 'apostolic administration', for lack of an incumbent prefect, notably from the bishoprics of Sapporo (Japan) or Irkutsk (Siberia, Russia).

== Statistics ==
As per 2014, it pastorally served 1,000 Catholics (0.2% of 559,000 total) on 87,100 km^{2} in 4 parishes, with 1 priest (diocesan) and 4 lay religious sisters.

== Episcopal ordinaries ==
(all Roman Rite)

=== Apostolic Prefecture of Karafuto ===
Apostolic Prefects of Karafuto

1. Apostolic Administrator Wenceslaus Kinold (ヴェンチェスラオ・キノルド), Friars Minor (O.F.M.) (1934–1938), while Titular Bishop of Panemotichus (1929.03.18 – death 1952.05.22) & last Apostolic Vicar of Sapporo 札幌 (Japan) (1929.03.18 – retired 1941)
2. Rev. Felice Herrmann, O.F.M. (1938.05.31 – death 1941)
3. Apostolic Administrator Rev. Toda Lorenzo Tatewaki (1941–1944)
4. Rev. Agostino Isamu Seno (1944–1953)
5. Apostolic Administrator Rev. Benedict Takahiko Tomizawa (ベネディクト冨澤孝彦) (30 January 1953 – 3 October 1987), while first Bishop of Sapporo 札幌 (Japan) (1952.12.11 – death 1987.10.03)
6. Apostolic Administrator Peter Toshio Jinushi (ペトロ地主敏夫) (3 October 1987 – 2000), while Bishop of Sapporo 札幌 (Japan) (1952.12.11 – death 1987.10.03) (札幌) (Japan) (1987.10.03 – 2009.11.17)
7. Apostolic Administrator Jerzy Mazur, Society of the Divine Word (S.V.D.) (2000 – 17 April 2003), while Apostolic Administrator of Eastern Siberia (Russia) (1999.05.18 – 2002.02.11), then Bishop of Saint Joseph at Irkutsk (Russia) (2002.02.11 – 2003.04.17)

=== Apostolic Prefecture of Yuzhno Sakhalinsk ===
Apostolic Prefects of Yuzhno Sakhalinsk

1. Apostolic Administrator Cyryl Klimowicz (17 April 2003 – ...), while Bishop of Saint Joseph at Irkutsk (Russia) (2003.04.17 – ...)

== See also ==
- List of Roman Catholic dioceses in Russia
- Catholic Church in Russia
