= List of Catholic dioceses in Russia =

The Catholic Church in Russia, united in the Episcopal Conference of Russia, comprises

- one Latin ecclesiastical province (the Metropolitan archdiocese of Moscow, with three Suffragan dioceses) and a missionary (hence exempt) apostolic prefecture.
- The Eastern Catholics have two proper jurisdictions, each belonging to a different particular church sui iuris and using a different rite.

There are no exempt Latin jurisdictions.

There is an Apostolic Nunciature as papal diplomatic representation (embassy-level) to the Russian Federation in the national capital Moscow.

== Current Jurisdictions ==
=== Latin Church ===
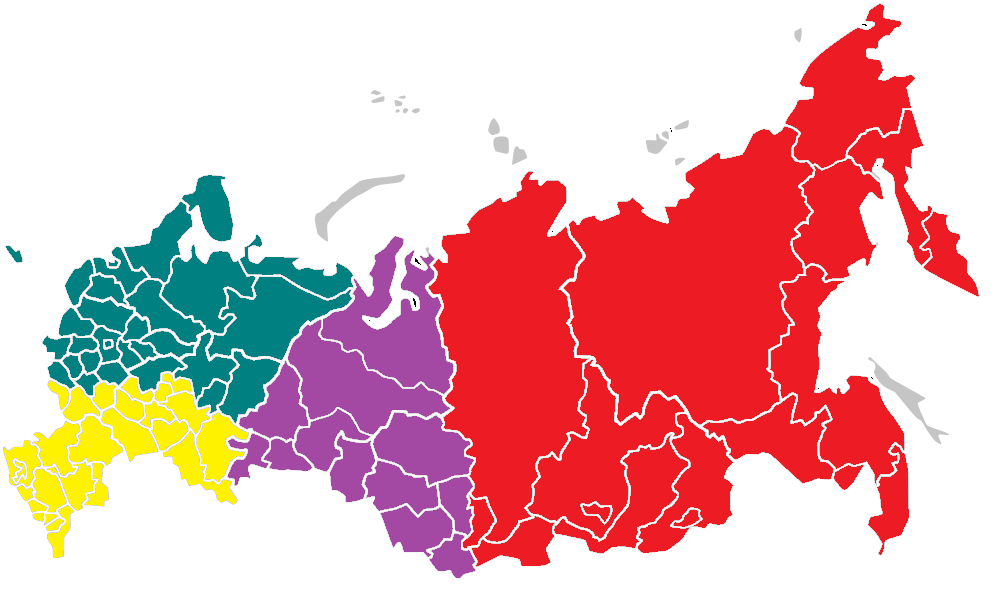
Map of the Ecclesiastical Province of Moscow

==== Ecclesiastical Province of Moscow ====
- Metropolitan Archdiocese of Moscow
  - Diocese of Novosibirsk
  - Diocese of Saratov
  - Diocese of Irkutsk

==== Exempt jurisdiction ====
(directly subject to the Holy See)

- Apostolic Prefecture of Yuzhno Sakhalinsk

=== Eastern Catholic Particular Churches ===
==== Russian Catholic Church ====
(Byzantine Rite)

- Russian Catholic Apostolic Exarchate of Russia

==== Armenian Catholic Church ====
(Armenian Rite)

- Ordinariate for Armenian Catholics in Eastern Europe, jointly for Russia, Armenia, Georgia (country) and Ukraine

== Defunct jurisdictions ==
=== Titular sees ===
(all Latin)

- One non-metropolitan titular archbishopric
  - Archdiocese of Nicopsis
- Two Latin titular bishoprics
  - Matrega, formerly Diocese of Matriga
  - Latin Titular bishopric of Tanais, formerly of Tana, formerly Diocese of Tana

=== Other former dioceses ===
Exclusing merely renamed/promoted predecessors of current jurisdictions
Latin

- Roman Catholic Diocese of Cherson alias Tiraspol (partially in Moldova)
- Roman Catholic Diocese of Sambia (German Samland)
- Apostolic Vicariate of Siberia
- Roman Catholic Diocese of Smolensk
- Roman Catholic Diocese of Vladivostok

Eastern Catholic

- Ruthenian Catholic Eparchy of Smolensk

== Crimea ==
After the Crimea peninsula was unilaterally annexed by the Russian Federation in March 2014, the Catholic hierarchy was not subsequently changed. The Latin rite Catholics of Crimea belong to the diocese of Odesa-Simferopol which is a Suffragan of the archdiocese of Lviv while the faithful of Byzantine rite have their own Ukrainian Catholic Archiepiscopal Exarchate of Krym which is directly subject to the Major Archbishop of Ukrainian Greek Catholic Church.

== See also ==
- List of Catholic dioceses (structured view)
