= Amangeldy =

Amangeldy (also spelled Amangeldi) is a given name of Central Asian origin. Notable people with the name include:

- Amangeldy Aytaly (1939–2022), Kazakh academic and politician
- Amangeldy Hydyr (born 1951), Turkmenistani painter
- Amankeldı İmanov (1873–1919), Kazakh revolutionary
- Amangeldy Muraliyev (born 1947), Kyrgyz politician
- Amangeldy Shabdarbayev (born 1950), Kazakh intelligence officer
- Amangeldi Taspihov (born 1959), Kazakh politician, businessman, and trade unionist
- Amangeldy Gumirovich Tuleyev (born 1944), Russian statesman

== See also ==
- Amangeldi, a village in Kostanay Region, Kazakhstan
