= Mother of God Church, Vladivostok =

Coordinates: 43.1164°N 131.9114°E

Mother of God Church
- Церковь Пресвятой Богородицы
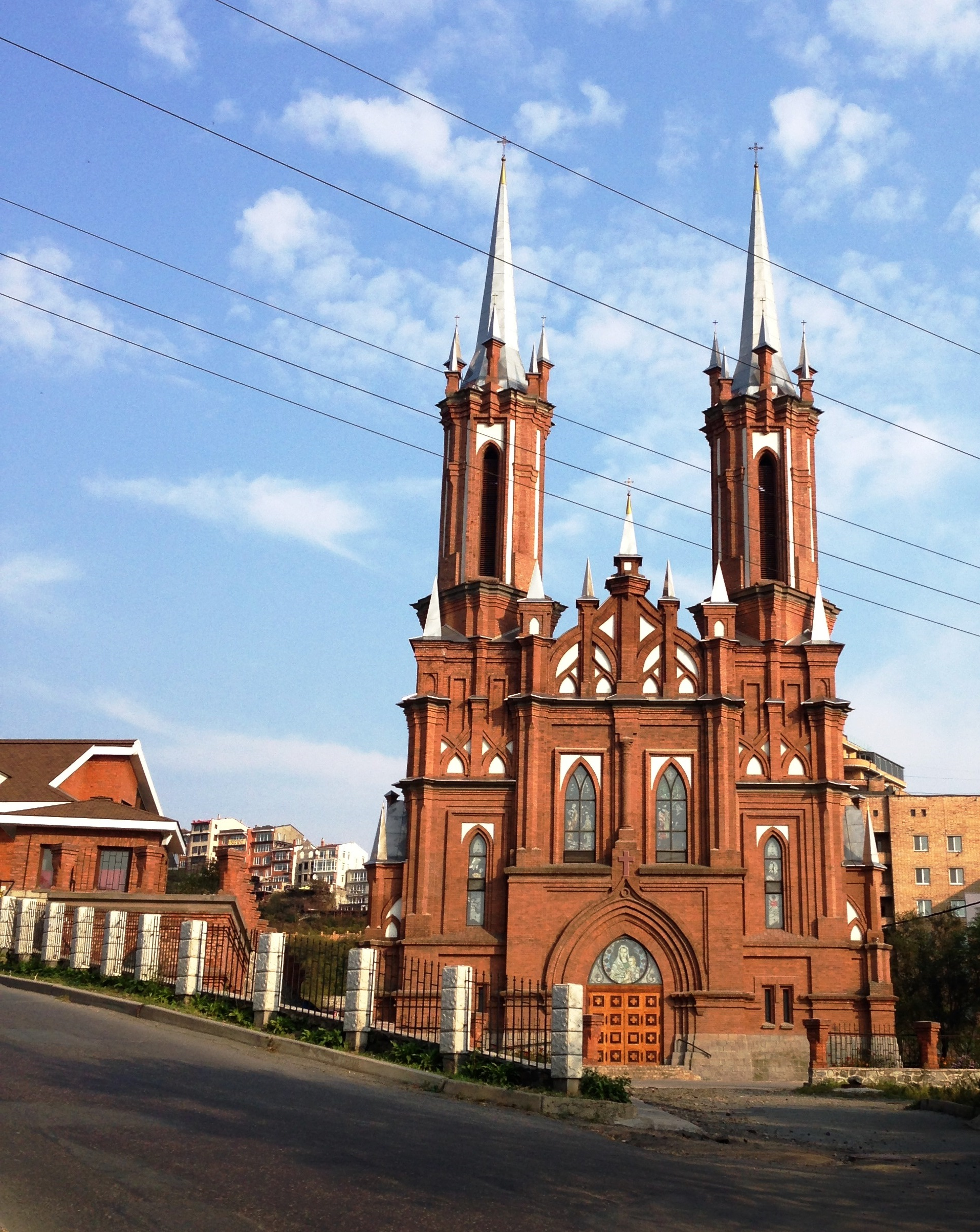
- Mother of God Church
- Location: Vladivostok
- Country: Russia
- Denomination: Roman Catholic

Architecture
- Functional status: Active
- Style: Gothic Revival
- Completed: 11 January 1890

Administration
- Diocese: Diocese of Irkutsk

The Mother of God Church (Russian: Церковь Пресвятой Богородицы) It is a Latin Catholic church, built in a Gothic Revival style, located in Vladivostok in the Far East of Russia.

It is the seat of the deanery of Vladivostok, which depends on the Diocese of Irkutsk. It is located at 22 Volodarsky Street. It was formerly a cathedral church.

== History ==
=== Founding and suppression ===
Catholics, mostly Poles, were present in Vladivostok since the mid-nineteenth century. The first Catholic parish in Siberia and the Russian Far East appeared in 1825 in Irkutsk.

As the imperial (later Soviet) fleet moved to Vladivostok, the new port and fortress under construction attracted a number of people who came from all corners of the Empire, including Polish Catholics, Lithuanians etc. They were artisans, merchants, simple workers or soldiers.

The municipal assembly (Duma) donated the land in 1885 until 1886. The parish itself was erected on January 11, 1890, a few months before the start of the construction of the Trans-Siberian Railway to Vladivostok from May 1891.

During the Soviet suppression of the Catholic Church from the 1920s, the Mary Mother of God Church was turned into a state archive building.

=== Restoration ===
In February 1992, two American Catholics, Fr. Myron Effing and Bro. Daniel Maurer, arrived in Vladivostok as missionaries, around the time that Pope John Paul II was re-establishing a hierarchy in post-communist Russia. They founded the Mary Mother of God Mission Society, initially with the support of Archbishop Francis Thomas Hurley of Alaska, and became the first Catholic clergy in Vladivostok since the Soviet suppression of the Catholic Church. The society received the keys to the Mary Mother of God Church on January 1, 1994. The parish they took over grew from ten surviving baptized Catholics when they arrived to over 600 as of 2026.

== Administration ==
From 1923 to 2002, Vladivostok was the cathedral episcopal see of the Roman Catholic Diocese of Vladivostok, which was merged into the Diocese of Saint Joseph at Irkutsk and remains a deanery.

== See also ==
- Roman Catholicism in Russia
- Mother of God Church

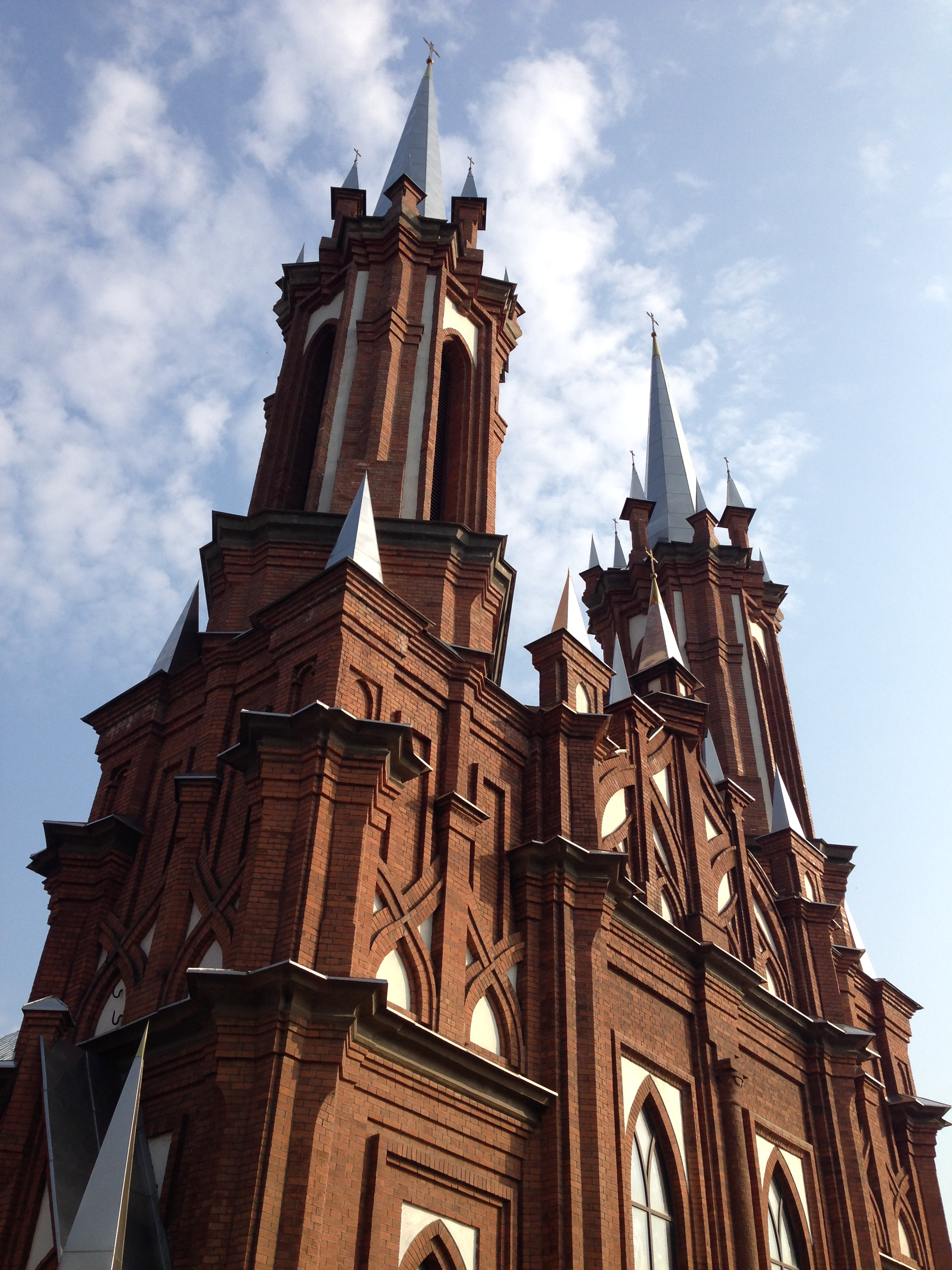
Another View
