= Cyryl Klimowicz =

Roman Catholic bishop (born 1952)

His Excellency Cyryl Klimowicz
- Saint Joseph at Irkutsk
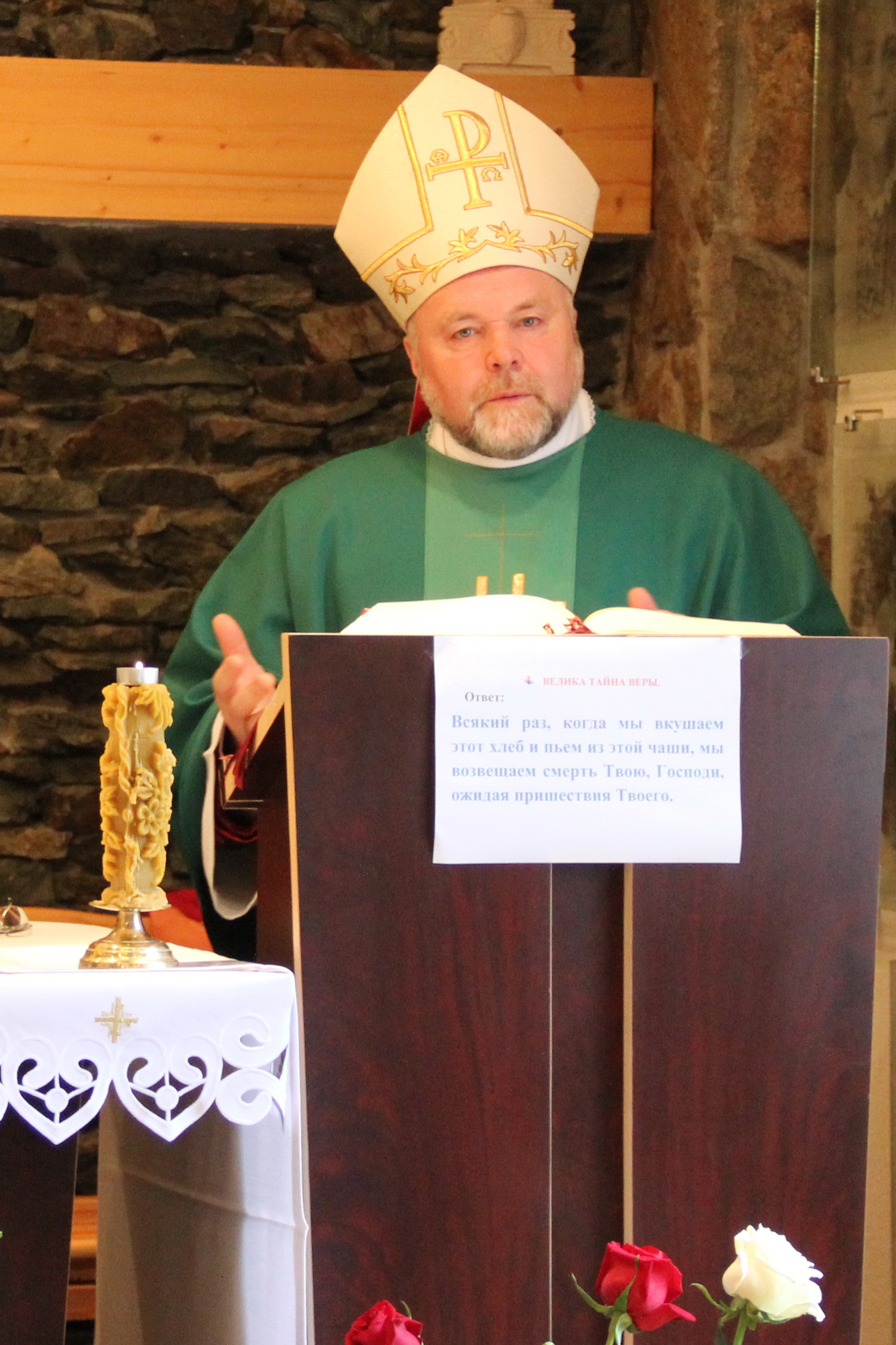
- Church: Roman Catholic
- Diocese: Saint Joseph at Irkutsk
- Appointed: 17 April 2003
- Installed: 15 June 2003

Orders
- Ordination: 8 June 1980
- Consecration: 4 December 1999 by Kazimierz Świątek

Personal details
- Born: November 5, 1952 (age 73) Amangeldy, Kazakh SSR, Soviet Union
- Coat of arms

Bishop Cyryl Klimowicz (Russian: Кирилл Леопольдович Климович; born November 5, 1952, in Amangeldy, near Almaty, Kazakhstan) is the Ordinary of the Roman Catholic Diocese of Saint Joseph at Irkutsk.

== Life and career ==
Klimowicz was born in Kazakhstan to Polish parents. From 1956 to 1965 he lived in the Belarusian Soviet Socialist Republic, and later he moved with his family to Poland. After graduating from high school in 1974 he entered the Major Seminary «Hosianum» in the city of Olsztyn (Poland), from which he graduated in 1980. He was ordained as priest on June 8, 1980, by the Primate of Poland Cardinal Józef Glemp.

After his ordination, Klimowicz served as vicar in the cities Wydminy, Pasłęk and Klewki under Olsztyn; in this period he participated in the construction of a new seminary in Olsztyn, Poland. In July 1990 he became rector and dean of Głębokie in the archdiocese of Minsk-Mogilev (Belarus).

On October 13, 1999, Pope John Paul II appointed Klimowicz as auxiliary bishop to the Roman Catholic Archdiocese of Minsk-Mohilev, Titular Bishop of Arban (October 13, 1999 - April 17, 2003). On December 4, 1999, in the Cathedral of the Blessed Virgin Mary at Minsk, he was consecrated as bishop by Cardinal Kazimierz Świątek.

From 1999 to 2003 Bishop Klimowicz was Vicar General of the Minsk-Mogilev Archdiocese and rector of the Cathedral in Minsk. On April 17, 2003, Pope John Paul II appointed him as diocesan bishop of the Diocese of Saint Joseph with the center in Irkutsk. On June 15, 2003, in Irkutsk Cathedral of the Immaculate Heart of the Mother of God, he was inaugurated as the new diocesan bishop.

On January 18, 2005, Bishop Klimowicz was appointed Vice-Chairman of the Conference of Catholic Bishops of Russia (KKER). He is Head of the Catechetical Commission and the Commission for inter-Christian and interreligious dialogue and dialogue with non-believers. He is fluent in Belarusian, Russian, Polish and Italian.
