= Diocese of Vladivostok =

Former Latin Catholic diocese in Russia

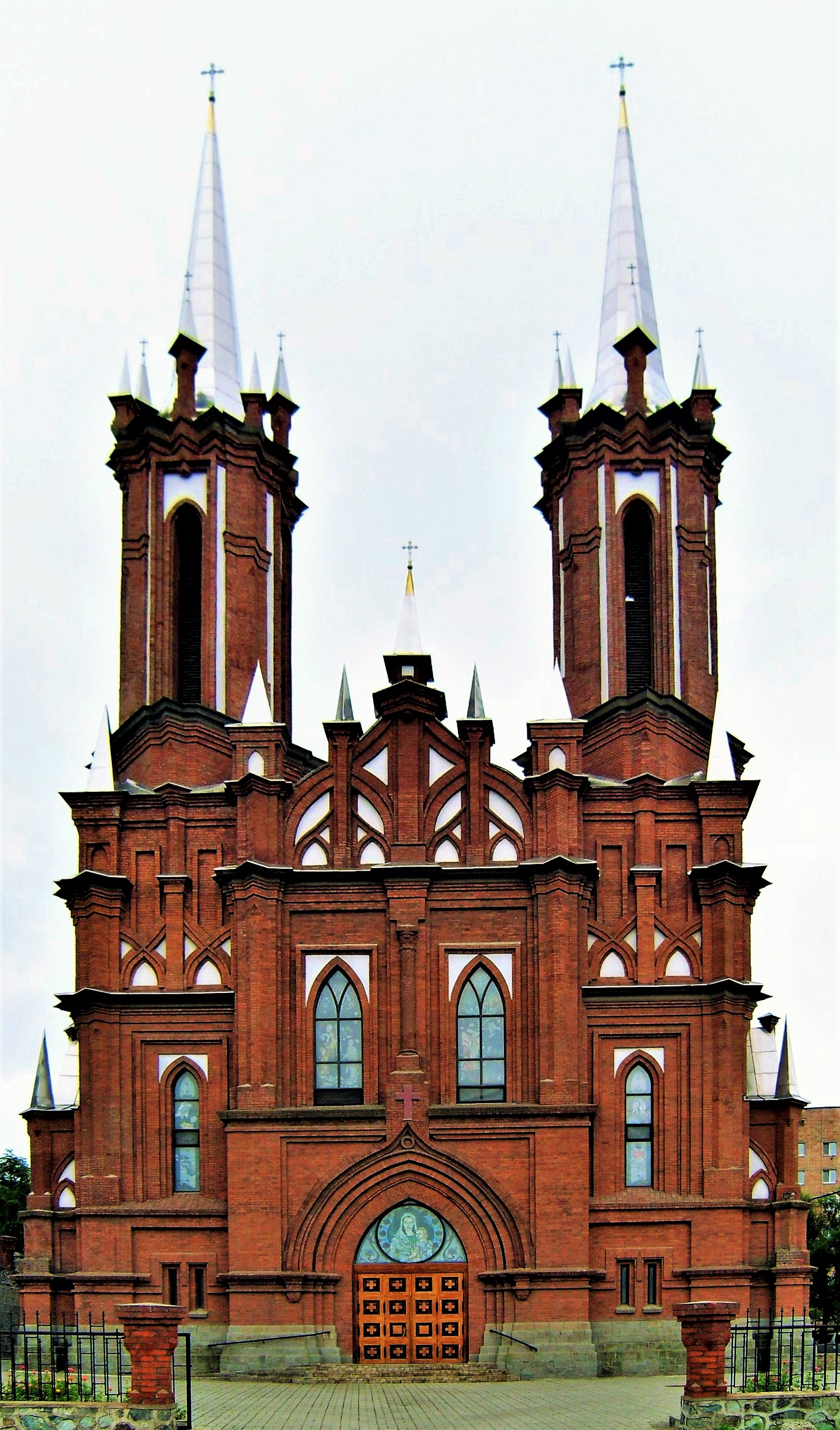

The Diocese of Vladivostok was a Latin Church diocese of the Catholic Church in eastern Russia and West Turkestan (1923-2002).

== History ==
It was established on 2 February 1923 as Diocese of Vladivostok, on Czarist Russian imperial territory (Vladivostok was then under the control of the Provisional Priamurye Government), canonically split off from the Apostolic Vicariate of Siberia (erected in 1921 from the Archdiocese of Mohilev).

On 1991.04.13, following the dissolution of the Soviet Union, it lost huge territories to establish the Apostolic Administration of Kazakhstan and Apostolic Administration of Novosibirsk.

On 2002.02.11 it was suppressed, its territory being merged into the Diocese of Saint Joseph at Irkutsk, within which Vladivostok remains a deanery.

== Episcopal ordinaries ==
(probably incomplete; Roman Rite)

Bishops of Vladivostok

- Karol Slivosky (1923.02.02 – 1933.01.06), Russian.

== See also ==
- Mother of God Church, Vladivostok, the former Cathedral (episcopal see)
