= Roman Catholic parish cemetery in Suwałki =

Cemetery in Suwałki, Poland

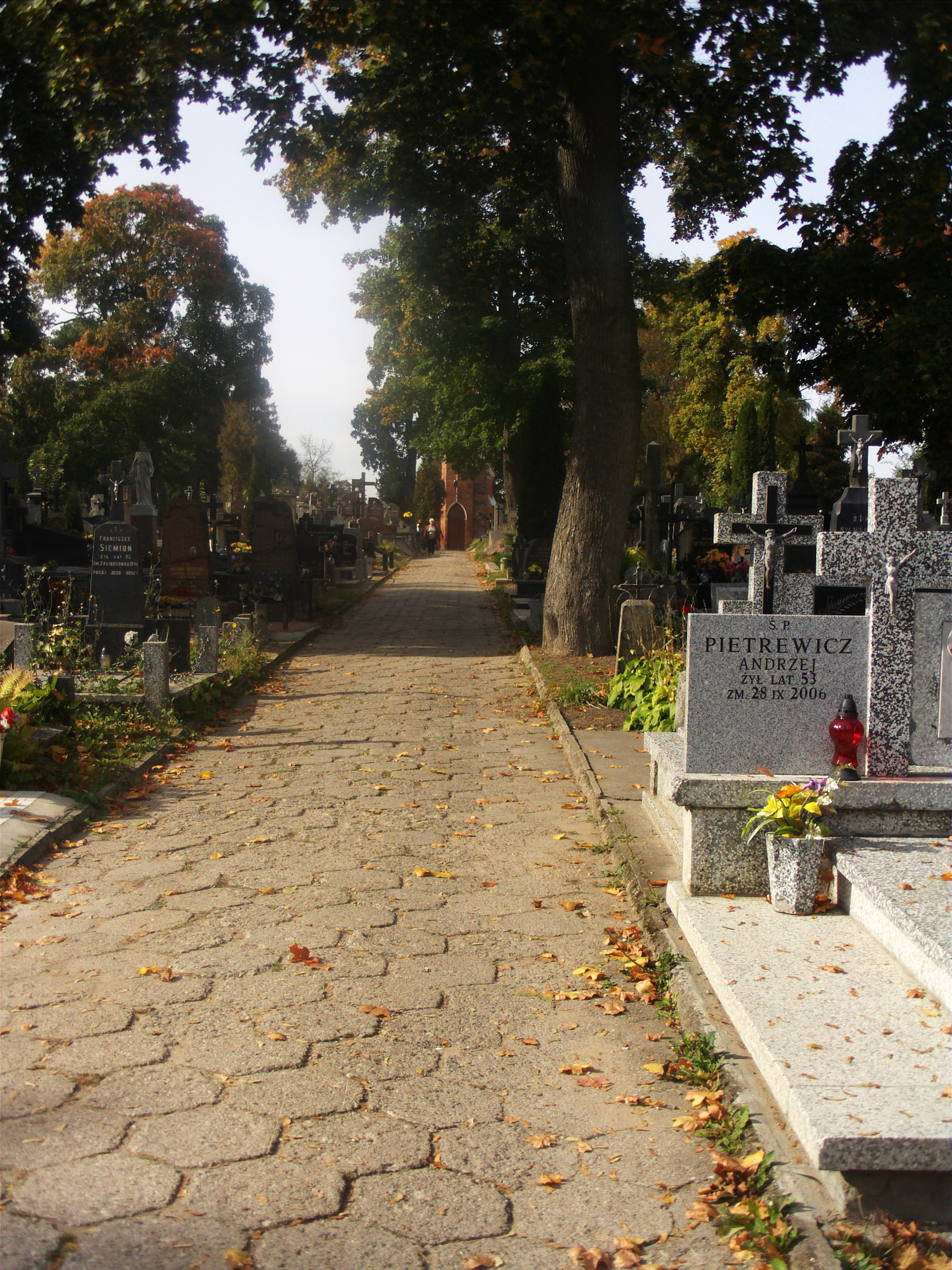
- Main avenue in the cemetery
- Interactive map of Roman Catholic parish cemetery in Suwałki

Details
- Established: 1820
- Location: Suwałki
- Country: Poland
- Coordinates: 54°05′49″N 22°54′51″E
- Type: Roman Catholic
- Owned by: Co-Cathedral Parish of St. Alexander in Suwałki
- Size: 10.5 ha (26 acres)

The Roman Catholic parish cemetery in Suwałki is the cemetery serving the Roman Catholic community of Suwałki. The necropolis belongs to the Co-Cathedral Parish of St. Alexander and is located on Zarzecze Street in the western part of the city. It was established in 1820 and remains the largest cemetery in Suwałki.

In the oldest part of the cemetery, there are historic gravestones and tomb figures, along with a Neo-Gothic cemetery chapel dedicated to the Transfiguration of the Lord, built in 1854 according to a design by Karol Majerski. Among the notable graves are those of prominent residents of Suwałki, including Teofil Noniewicz, Edward Szczepanik, and Father Jerzy Zawadzki.

== Location ==
The cemetery is situated in the western part of the city along Bakałarzewska Street, which is part of provincial road no. 653. The oldest main gate is located on Zarzecze Street. Nearby, the Czarna Hańcza river flows through the area. Close to the cemetery are the Municipal Stadium and the Piastowskie Housing Estate.

The cemetery borders burial grounds of other faiths: Evangelical, Orthodox (including Greek Catholic), Jewish, and Muslim cemeteries. The entire cemetery complex was registered as a heritage site in 1986 and is legally protected.

== History ==
The origins of the Roman Catholic parish cemetery in Suwałki date back to 1820, when the burial site was moved from its location near what is now Konstytucja 3 Maja Park. The previous cemetery had a wooden church built during the Camaldolese foundation era. The church and cemetery occupied an area of about 1.8 hectares in the city center near the market square. After a century of use, the church was in poor condition, further weakened by a severe storm in 1818. The following year, it was decided to build a new church. In 1820, due to the start of construction of the new church and ongoing regulatory works in the city, the cemetery was relocated beyond the Czarna Hańcza river, where a wooden chapel was built at the new burial site. Shortly thereafter, cemeteries of other denominations were also established in the vicinity.

The cemetery, fence, and chapel were maintained through parishioners' contributions. In July 1852, the Civil Governor of Augustów issued an edict ordering the expansion of the cemetery due to the lack of burial space. In 1854, a new brick chapel dedicated to the Transfiguration of the Lord was built on the site of the wooden chapel, designed by Suwałki architect Karol Majerski. The wood from the old chapel was sold, while the new chapel was built from granite stones.

In the early 21st century, the old section of the cemetery suffered acts of vandalism, including theft of historic stone gravestones and metal crosses and parts of monument fences.

== Layout of the cemetery ==
The entire necropolis has an "L" shape. The oldest section is laid out in a rectangular shape. In the center of this section is the cemetery's main avenue, stretching from the main gate on Zarzecze Street to the cemetery's end, encircling the chapel that marks the end of the oldest part of the necropolis. The avenue divides the cemetery into a southern (newer) and northern (older) section. Only in certain places do paths branch off to the right and left. In the newer sections, there are perpendicular paths extending from the main avenue.

The younger part of the cemetery expands slightly, containing graves mostly from the latter half of the 20th century. This section ends at Grunwaldzka Street. In the early 21st century, the cemetery was expanded southward, making this currently the newest area. The cemetery is enclosed by a stone wall.

Initially, the arrangement of the graves was not governed by any guidelines, and no cemetery map existed. As a result, the graves are laid out somewhat chaotically, with rows that often branch into multiple lines or fade away, and there are no paths between the rows.

== Tombstones and monuments ==
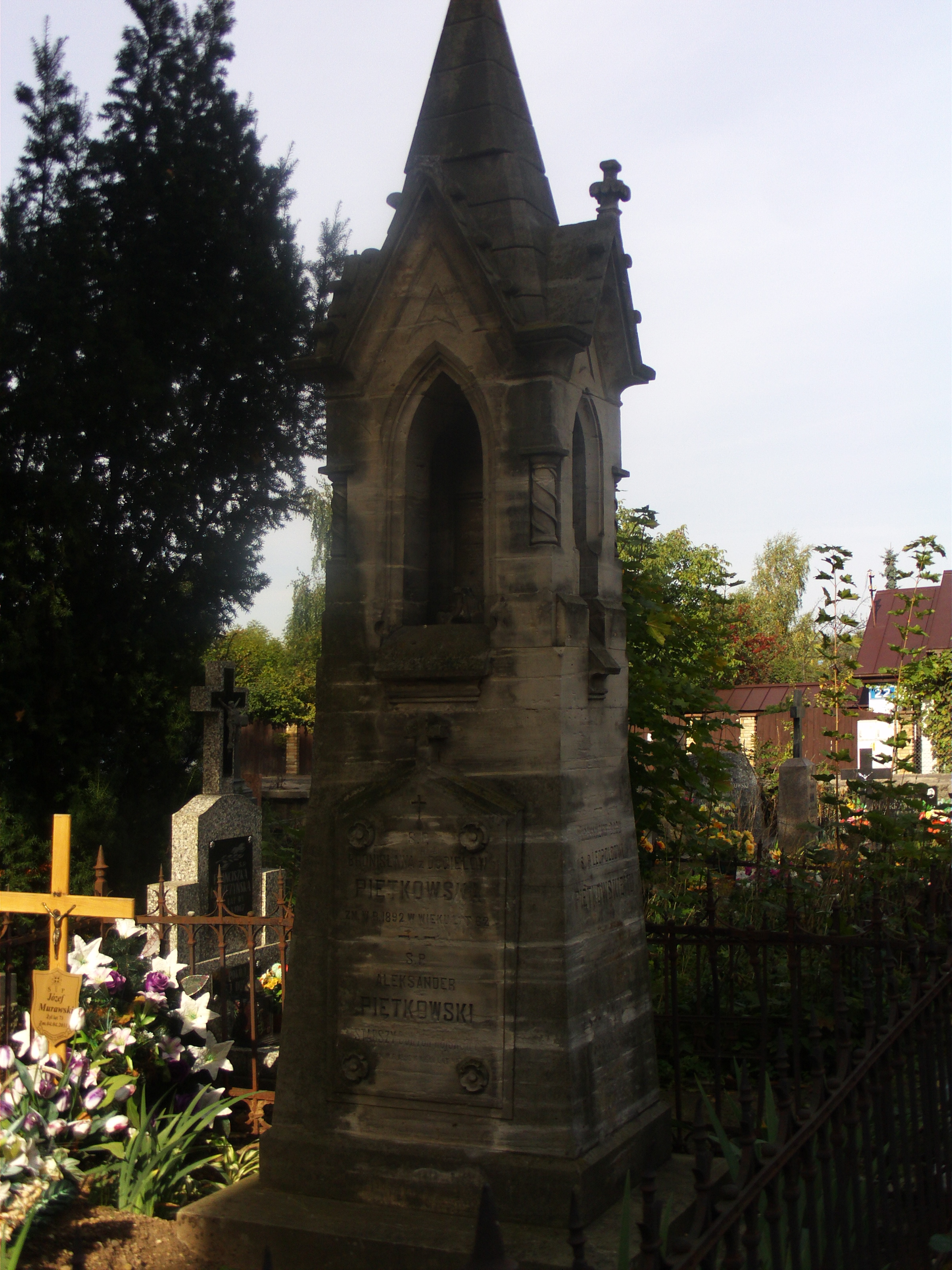
Monument in the oldest part of the cemetery, distinguished by its unique chapel-like form with a steeply pitched roof, is enclosed by a wrought-iron fence with a gate

In the oldest part of the cemetery are numerous historic monuments, though often 19th-century tombstones stand next to graves from the latter half of the 20th century. Many of the older graves are neglected and in disrepair; some have lost their burial mounds and tombstones, leaving only monuments or pedestals, which are sometimes overturned or buried. The vegetation overgrowth can obscure inscriptions, particularly on the oldest graves, making them difficult to read. Some tombstones are no longer in their original positions, and in certain cases, they have been reused, with inscriptions on both sides of the stone, likely due to the thriftiness of either stonemasons or the deceased's family.

Many monuments in the oldest section possess artistic value. Numerous graves feature stone crosses stylized as tree trunks, and many graves have elaborate iron crosses. Few iron tombstones have survived intact. The most distinguished monuments are situated near the chapel and include the graves of notable Suwałki residents, such as Father Jerzy Zawadzki and Edward Szczepanik.

The newer sections of the cemetery are more organized, although some 19th- and early 20th-century monuments still remain, often alongside later graves. To the right of the main avenue (facing Bakałarzewska Street), there are more such monuments than on the left. A monument to the unknown soldier is also located along the main avenue.

The cemetery reflects the wealth of Suwałki's community across the ages, offering insights into the economic status of those buried and the regard in which their families held them. Based on the locations and grandeur of individual monuments, it is possible to gauge the prominence of specific families in Suwałki at different times, particularly within the cemetery's oldest section.

=== Mass grave of seven victims of German terror ===
The mass grave of seven victims of German terror is located in the northeastern part of the cemetery, near the fence along Grunwaldzka Street. It holds the remains of seven individuals killed by the Nazis in the Raczki settlement on 22 October 1944. The grave features a stone monument with a cross and a memorial plaque, with seven individual plates placed on the ground. The burial site is enclosed by an iron fence.

==== List of those interred ====
Surname	Name	Born
Balcer	Sławomir	1925
Balcer	Władysław	1907
Bujnowski	Piotr	1910
Dąbrowski	Sebastian	1907
Krejpcio	Antoni	1904
Paliński	Zygmunt	1904
Surażyński	Andrzej	1911

=== Mass grave of five victims of German terror ===
The mass grave of five victims of German terror is located in the northeastern part of the cemetery, close to the fence along Grunwaldzka Street and near the mass grave of seven other victims. It holds five individuals killed by the Nazis. The grave features a stone monument with a centrally placed cross and a memorial plaque. Five individual plates are laid on the ground, and the grave is enclosed by an iron fence.

==== List of those interred ====
Surname	Name	Born
Bokuniewicz	Antoni	1899
Horn	Janina	1909
Smolarczyk	Eugeniusz	1922
Smolarczyk	Irena	1925
Smolarczyk	Marianna	1901

=== Monument to the fallen soldiers of the Sejny Uprising ===
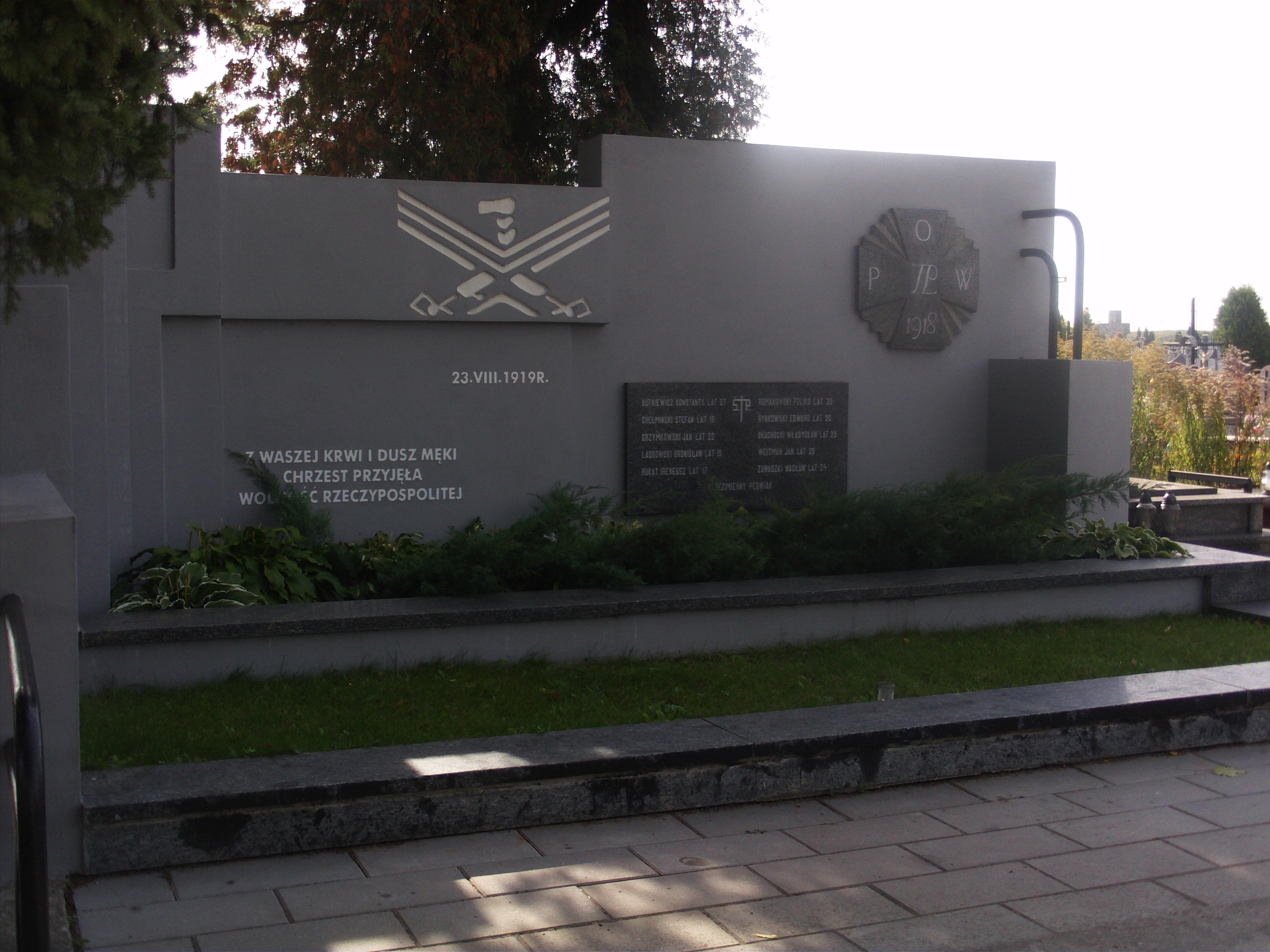
Monument of the Sejny insurgents

The monument to the fallen soldiers of the Sejny Uprising is located along the main avenue of the cemetery. It marks the collective grave of soldiers from the Polish Military Organization who died during the uprising on 25 August 1919. The bodies of the fallen were brought from Sejny, and their burial took place on August 28. Among the eleven buried insurgents, one remains unidentified.

The monument includes the date marking the beginning of the Sejny Uprising—23 August 1919—along with a plaque listing the names of the fallen, the POW emblem, and the following inscription:

From your blood and souls' suffering, freedom for the Republic was born.

==== The fallen insurgents ====
- Butkiewicz Konstanty
- Chełmiński Stefan
- Grzymkowski Jan
- Laskowski Bronisław
- Romanowski Feliks
- Rukat Ireneusz
- Rynkowski Edward
- Słuchocki Władysław
- Weitman Jan
- Zawadzki Wacław
- NN (unidentified)

=== Grave of soldiers of the Polish Military Organization ===
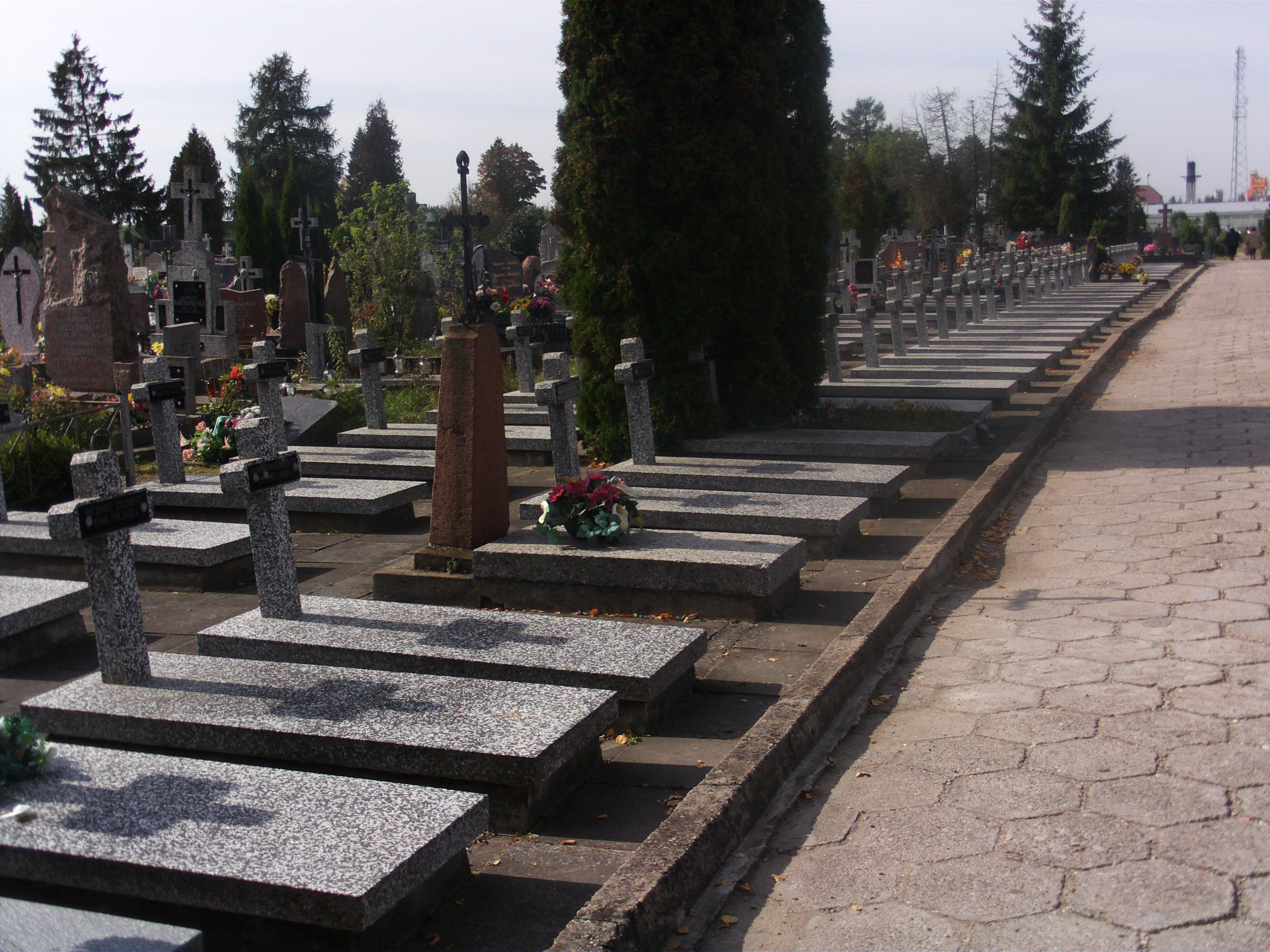
Individual graves of soldiers of the Polish Military Organization

The section dedicated to soldiers of the Polish Military Organization is located along the main avenue of the cemetery. It contains 77 individual graves arranged in two rows, primarily of soldiers from the years 1919 and 1920. Additionally, there are two graves of military personnel from World War II. Most of the burials are of unidentified soldiers.

This area also features a monument dedicated to soldiers of the Citizens' Home Army and the Freedom and Independence Association, who died between 1945 and 1954. Another monument honors 120 soldiers from the 2nd Grochow Uhlan Regiment under General Józef Dwernicki, who fell between 1917 and 1920.

==== List of identified soldiers ====
Surname	Name	Date of death
Ambler	Ignacy	23 September 1920
Domański	Stanisław	1920
Dziuk	Konstanty	12 July 1920
Gwiazda	Stanisław	no data
Kłoski	Franciszek	17 October 1920
Kowalski	Stanisław	1920
Laskowski	Stefan	30 September 1920
Nowak	Wincenty	1943
Nowakowski	Adam	11 March 1920
Pietrusiak	Antoni	18 March 1920
Poświatowski	Władysław	17 January 1920
Walowski	Wacław	no data
Żukowski	Stanisław	22 September 1939

== Notable people buried in the cemetery ==
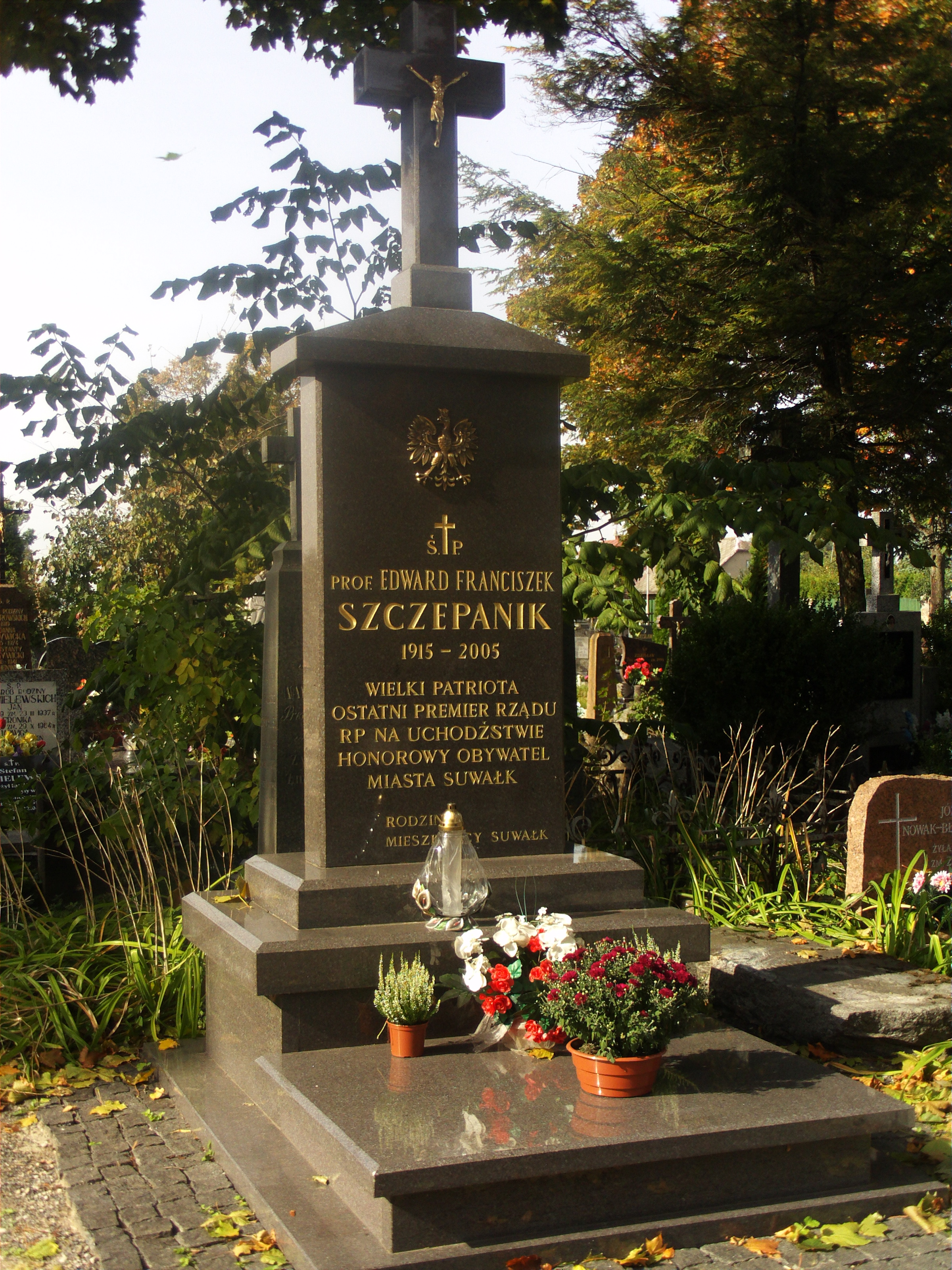
Grave of Edward Szczepanik

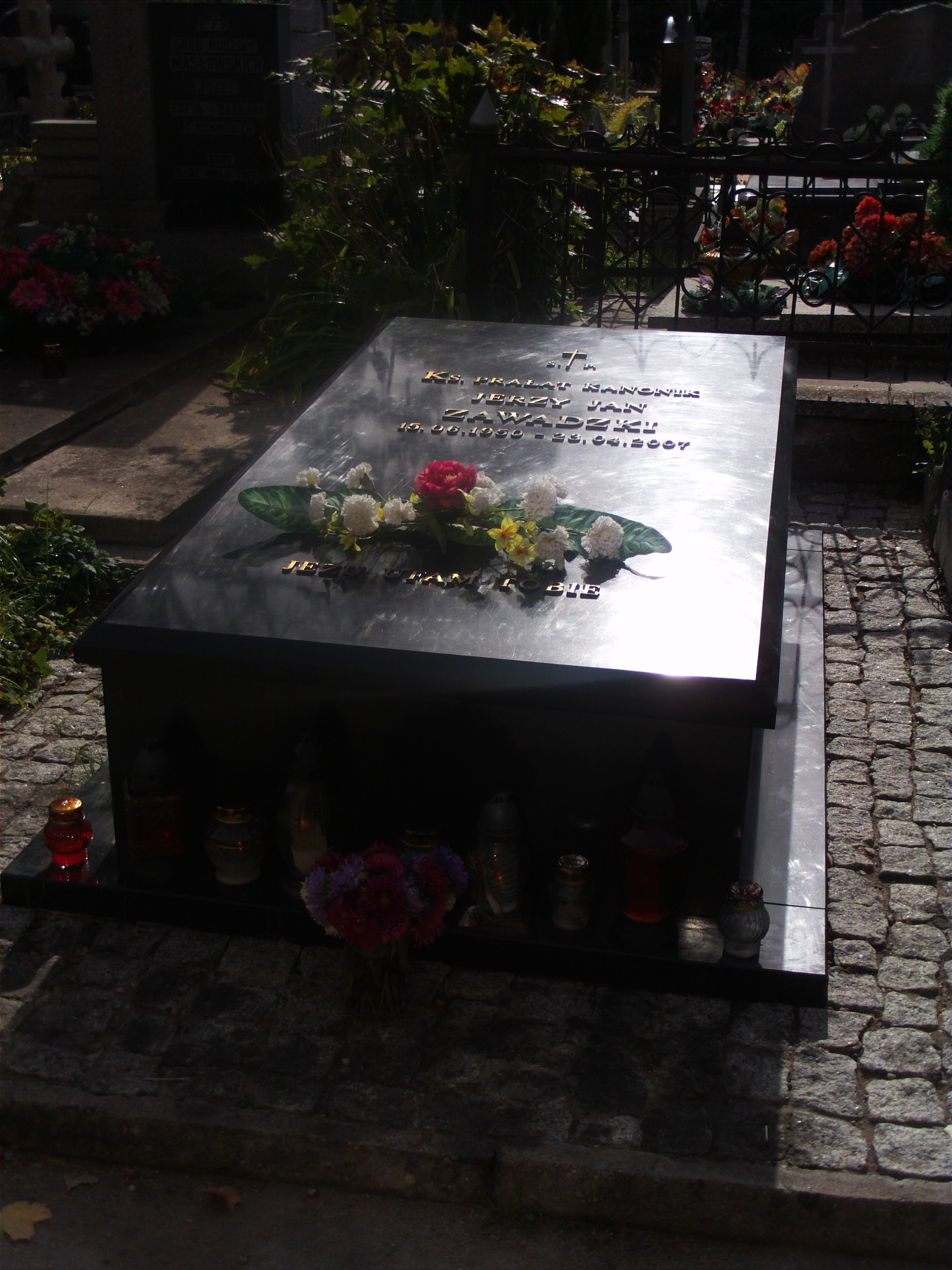
Grave of Father Jerzy Zawadzki

The parish cemetery contains the graves of several notable individuals, including:

- Józef Gajewski (1948–2010), a local government official and mayor of Suwałki between 1981 and 1987, as well as between 2002 and 2010.
- Jan Kaszuba (1937–2003), a teacher and state activist, mayor of Suwałki between 1975 and 1981.
- Teofil Noniewicz (1851–1928), a Suwałki doctor and social activist, co-founder and member of the Suwałki Medical Society, the Volunteer Fire Brigade, and the Christian Charity Society in Suwałki.
- Edward Szczepanik (1915–2005), an economist and the last Prime Minister of the Polish government-in-exile.
- Jan Schmidt (1873–1928), an organizer of the Temporary Civic Council of the Suwałki District and mayor of Suwałki between 1923 and 1927.
- Father Jerzy Zawadzki (1950–2007), a Catholic priest, social and charity activist, known as the "Shepherd of Suwałki's Poor", and the initiator of the first primary school for Romani children in Poland.
- Father Kazimierz Hamerszmit (1916–1996), a Catholic priest and Dachau concentration camp prisoner.
