= Edward Samsel =

Polish Roman Catholic bishop (1940 – 2003)

- Bishop of Ełk
- Appointed: 16 November 2000
- Previous posts: Auxiliary bishop of Ełk (1992 – 2000); Auxiliary bishop of Łomża (1982 – 1992); Titular bishop of Montecorvino (1982 – 2000)

Orders
- Ordination: 23 May 1964 by Czesław Falkowski
- Consecration: 30 May 1982 by Mikołaj Sasinowski

Personal details
- Born: 2 January 1940 Myszyniec
- Died: 17 January 2003 (aged 63) Białystok
- Motto: Spes unica

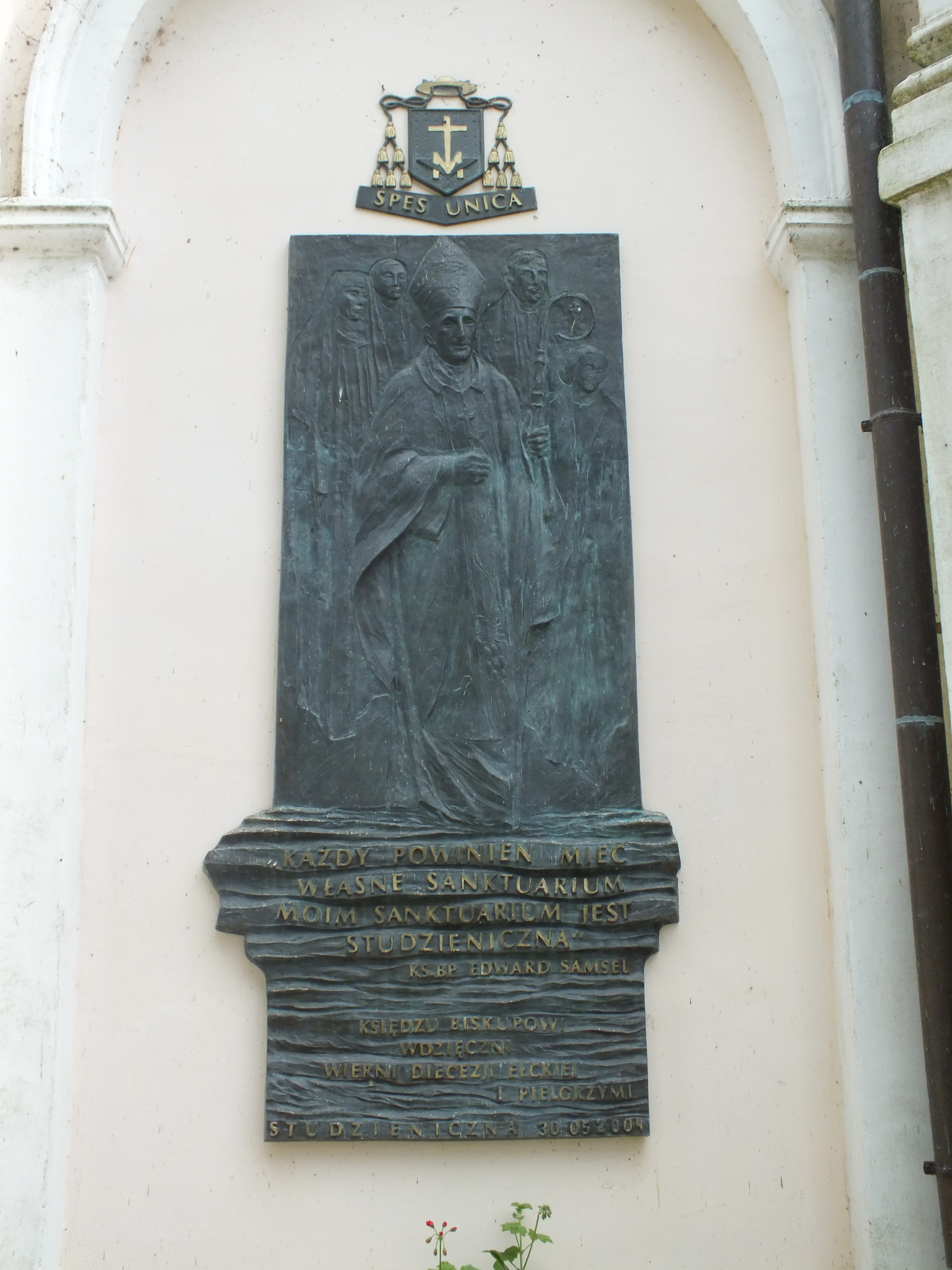
Commemorative plaque for Edward Samsel at the Chapel of the Blessed Virgin Mary in Augustów, Poland

Edward Eugeniusz Samsel (2 January 1940 – 17 January 2003) was a Roman Catholic bishop of the Diocese of Ełk from 2000 until his death in 2003.

== Biography ==
Samsel was born in Myszyniec to Jan and Walerian Samsel (née Brzostek). He received his first communion on 9 January 1949 and received the sacrament of confirmation from Aleksander Mościcki, auxiliary bishop of Łomża. After completing his matura in 1958, he began attending the diocesan seminary in Łomża. He was ordained a priest on 23 May 1964 by Czesław Falkowski. After his ordination, he studied biblical studies at Cardinal Stefan Wyszyński University from 1965 to 1969, continuing his studies at the Pontifical University of Saint Thomas Aquinas. He obtained a doctorate in theology from the Pontifical University in 1972. He later studied at the École Biblique between 1972 and 1973.

Upon returning to Poland, Samsel served as prefect of studies at the diocesan seminary at Łomża between 1973 and 1974. He would later serve as the spiritual father of the same seminary between 1974 and 1982. He also served as the seminary's rector in 1983. Samsel was appointed auxiliary bishop of Łomża and titular bishop of Montecorvino on 20 April 1982, and was consecrated on 30 May 1982 in the Cathedral of St. Michael the Archangel in Łomża by Mikołaj Sasinowski, assisted by Tadeusz Józef Zawistowski and Edward Ozorowski. As a result of the restructuring of the Catholic Church in Poland, Samsel was appointed auxiliary bishop of the Diocese of Ełk by John Paul II on 25 March 1992, and was appointed its bishop on 16 November 2000.

Samsel died on 17 January 2003. His funeral was held on 19 January and he was buried at the cathedral in Ełk.
