= Panemotichus =

Town in the late Roman province of Pamphylia Secunda

Coordinates: 37°15′52″N 30°30′03″E

Panemotichus or Panemoteichos was inland town in the late Roman province of Pamphylia Secunda. It was also a bishopric, a suffragan of the Perge, the metropolitan see of the province. It was inhabited during Roman and Byzantine times.

== History ==
Panemotichus coined money during the Roman epoch (Head, "Historia numorum", 591).

The city is spoken of by Hierocles in the sixth century (Synecedemus, 681, 3) and in the tenth by Constantine Porphyrogenitus ("De thematibus", ed. Bonn, III, 38).

Radet ("Les villes de la Pisidie", 4, reprinted from "Revue Archeologique", Paris, 1893) identifies it with the ruins of Badem Aghatch, south of Ghirme, in the Ottoman vilayet of Koniah.

== Ecclesiastical history ==
A Bishop Faustus assisted at the First Council of Nicaea in 325, when the city belonged to Isauria. Later it was part of Pamphylia Secunda. Another bishop, Cratinus, may have assisted at the Council of Chalcedon in 451. Hierius signed the provincial letter to Byzantine Emperor Leo VI the Wise. Helladius assisted at a minor Council of Constantinople in 536. (Le Quien, I, 1031). There is record of no other bishop and the see is not mentioned in the Notitiae Episcopatuum.

== Site ==
Its site is located near of Boğazköy, in Asiatic Turkey. Archaeologists have revealed Iron Age remains there.

== Sources ==
- GigaCatholic
