= St Alexander's Church, Suwałki =

Church of Saint Alexander in Suwałki
- Ecclesia Sancti Alexandri Suwalkiensis
- Konkatedra św. Aleksandra w Suwałkach
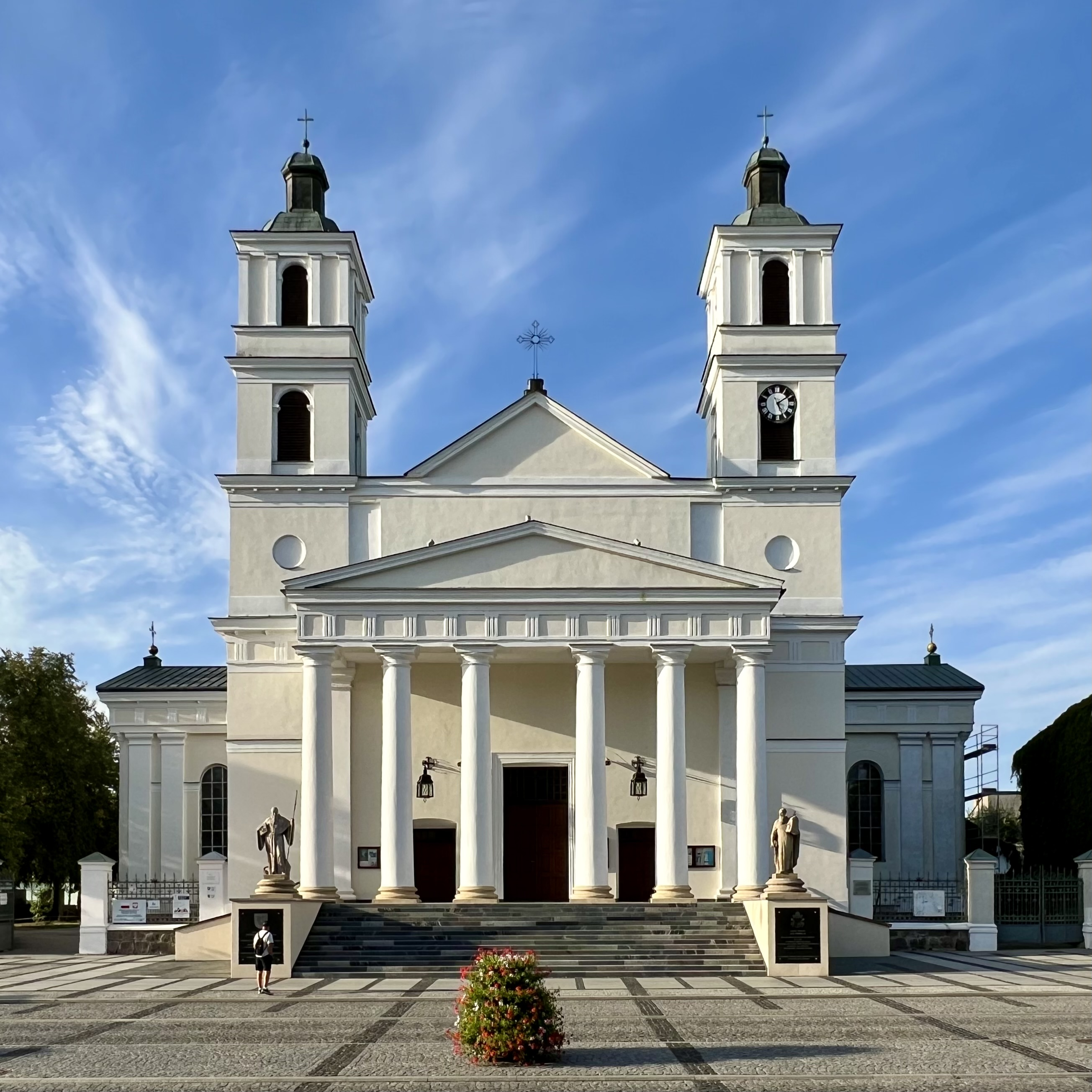
- Church of Saint Alexander in Suwałki
- 54°6′7″N 22°55′36″E
- Location: Suwałki, Podlaskie Voivodeship
- Address: ul. Emilii Plater 2, 16-400 Suwałki
- Country: Poland
- Denomination: Catholic Church
- Website: https://aleksandersuwalki.pl/

History
- Dedication: Saint Alexander

Architecture
- Functional status: active
- Architect(s): Ch. P. Aigner; H. Marconi
- Style: Classicism
- Years built: 1819-1829

Administration
- Diocese: Roman Catholic Diocese of Ełk

Clergy
- Vicars: Jacek Łukaszewicz; Adrian Sadowski

Church of Saint Alexander in Suwałki (Polish: Konkatedra św. Aleksandra w Suwałkach) is a Roman Catholic parish church belonging to the Suwałki deanery of St. Benedict and Romuald of the Ełk diocese. It is located on Józef Piłsudski Square.

Since 2021, the parish priest of St Alexander's Church has been Antoni Skowronski.

== History ==
In November 1815, Tsar Alexander I passed through Suwałki to attend his coronation in Warsaw, and seeing the decaying church leaning towards ruin, he ordered the construction of a brick church dedicated to St Alexander to be funded. On 23 July 1819, Suwałki was visited by the Governor of the Kingdom of Poland, General Józef Zajączek. On 20 June 1820, the cornerstone was consecrated, and in that year construction began on a classicist brick church, designed by architect Piotr Aigner. The church was being built as a future cathedral, as at the same time efforts were underway to move the bishop's residence from Sejny to Suwałki. On 14 September 1829, the first mass was celebrated in the new church.

Between 1843 and 1845, a general renovation of the church was carried out according to a design by the architect Enrico Marconi. On 14 September 1845, the Bishop of Sejny, Pawel Straszynski, consecrated the church dedicated to St Alexander. In 1856, the church towers were added. In 1872, a brick house was purchased for the vicarage. In 1881, the chapel of the Saviour Jesus Christ was added on the east side, and in 1883 the chapel of St Anne was added on the west side and In 1888 a sacristy was added.

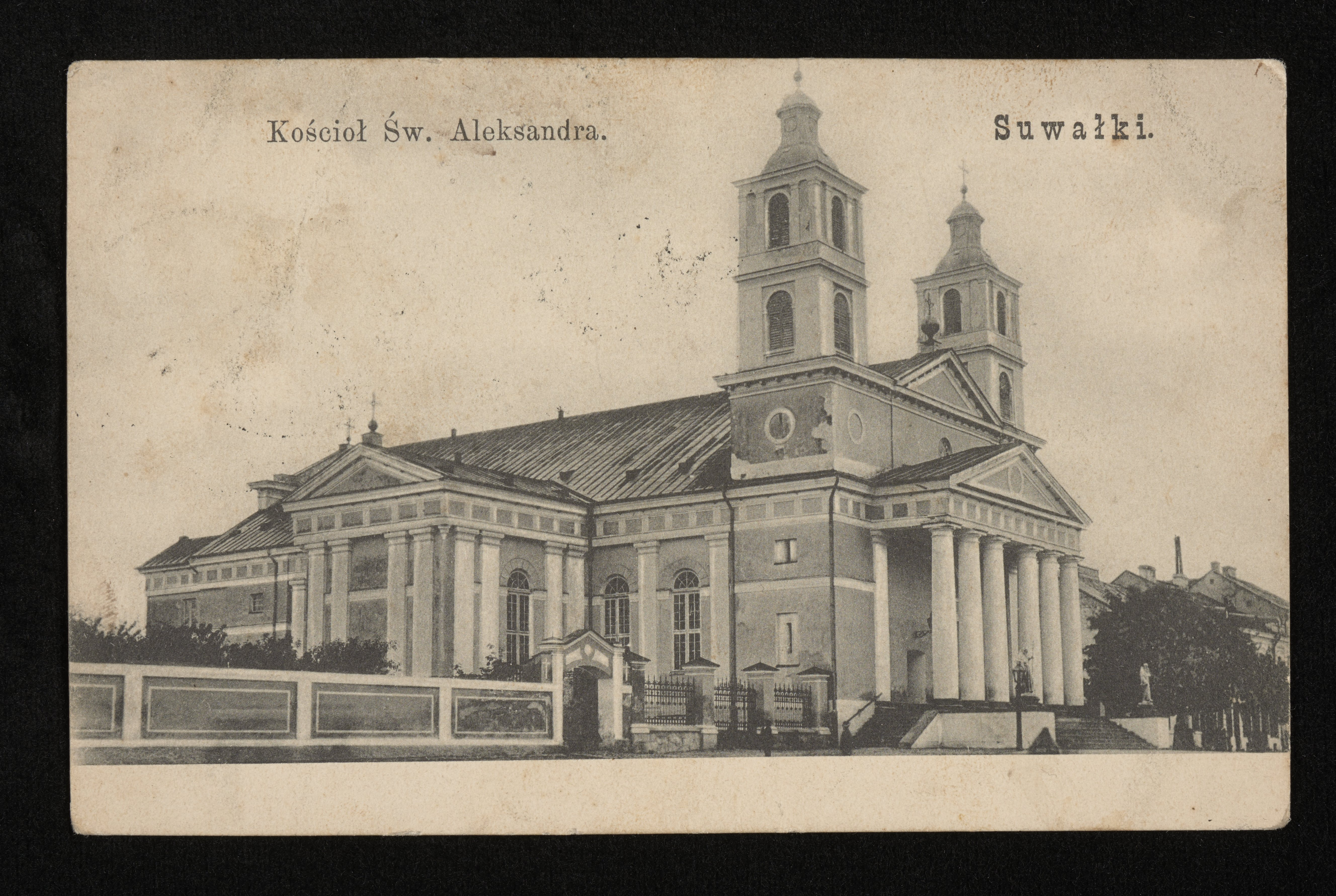
The Church of St Alexander in 1906

On 22 October 1944, the retreating Germans mined the church - causing severe damage. After the war the church was rebuilt, and in 1961 the church towers were rebuilt. On 25 March 1992, Pope John Paul II with the bull Totus Tuus Poloniae Populus (English: All Thy people in Poland) erected the diocese of Elk, and then, by the decision of Bishop Wojciech Ziemba, the church was raised to the dignity of a concathedral. On 4 July 2002, a storm and rain damaged the church. In 2002-2003 the church was renovated.

Inside are paintings by Franciszek Smuglewicz and plaques commemorating the struggle and martyrdom of the Suwałki region's inhabitants.

== Perpetual Adoration ==
2 February 2025 saw the inauguration of the Chapel of Perpetual Adoration dedicated to Jesus Christ the High Priest.

== Gallery ==
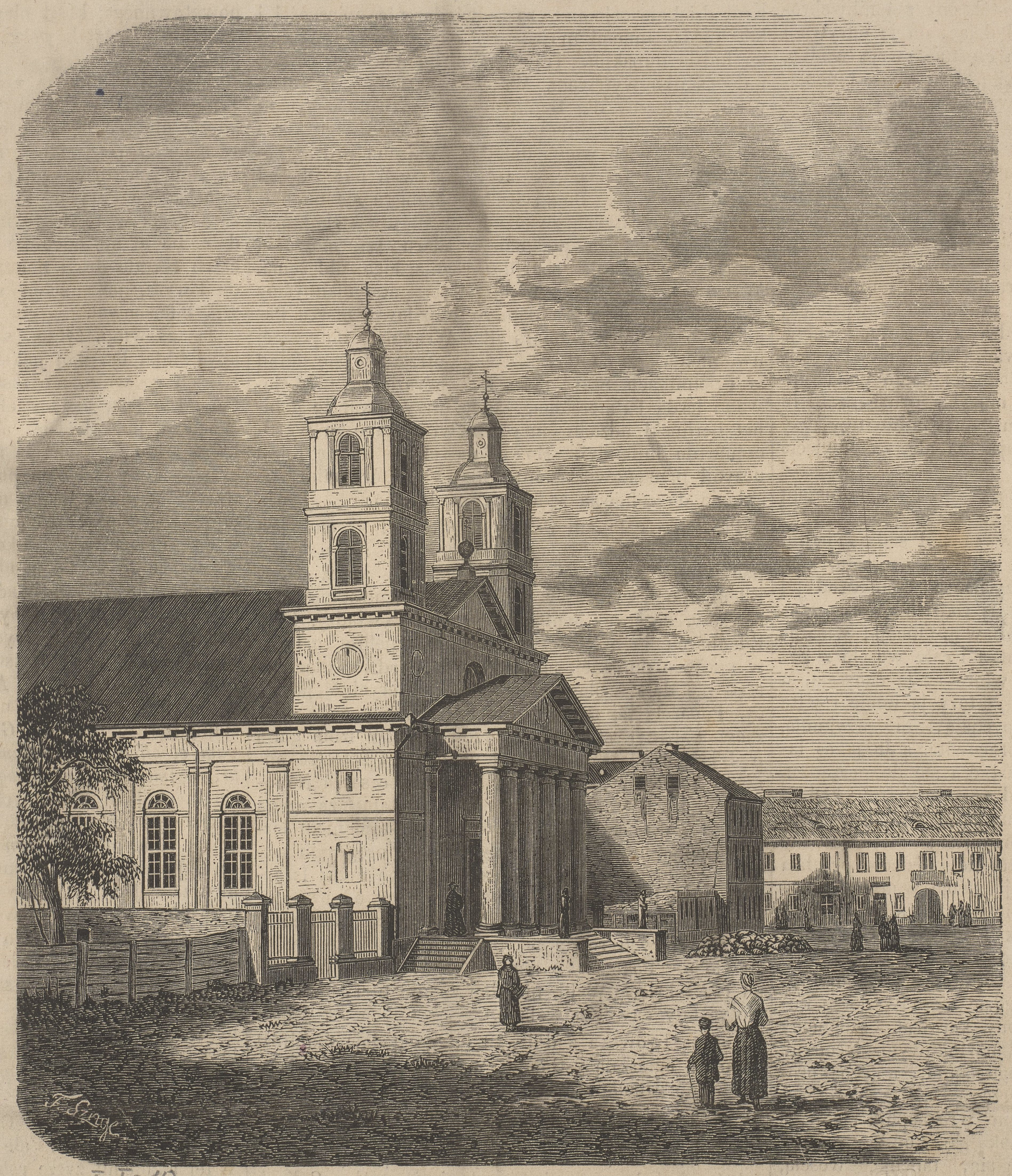
The church in c.1864

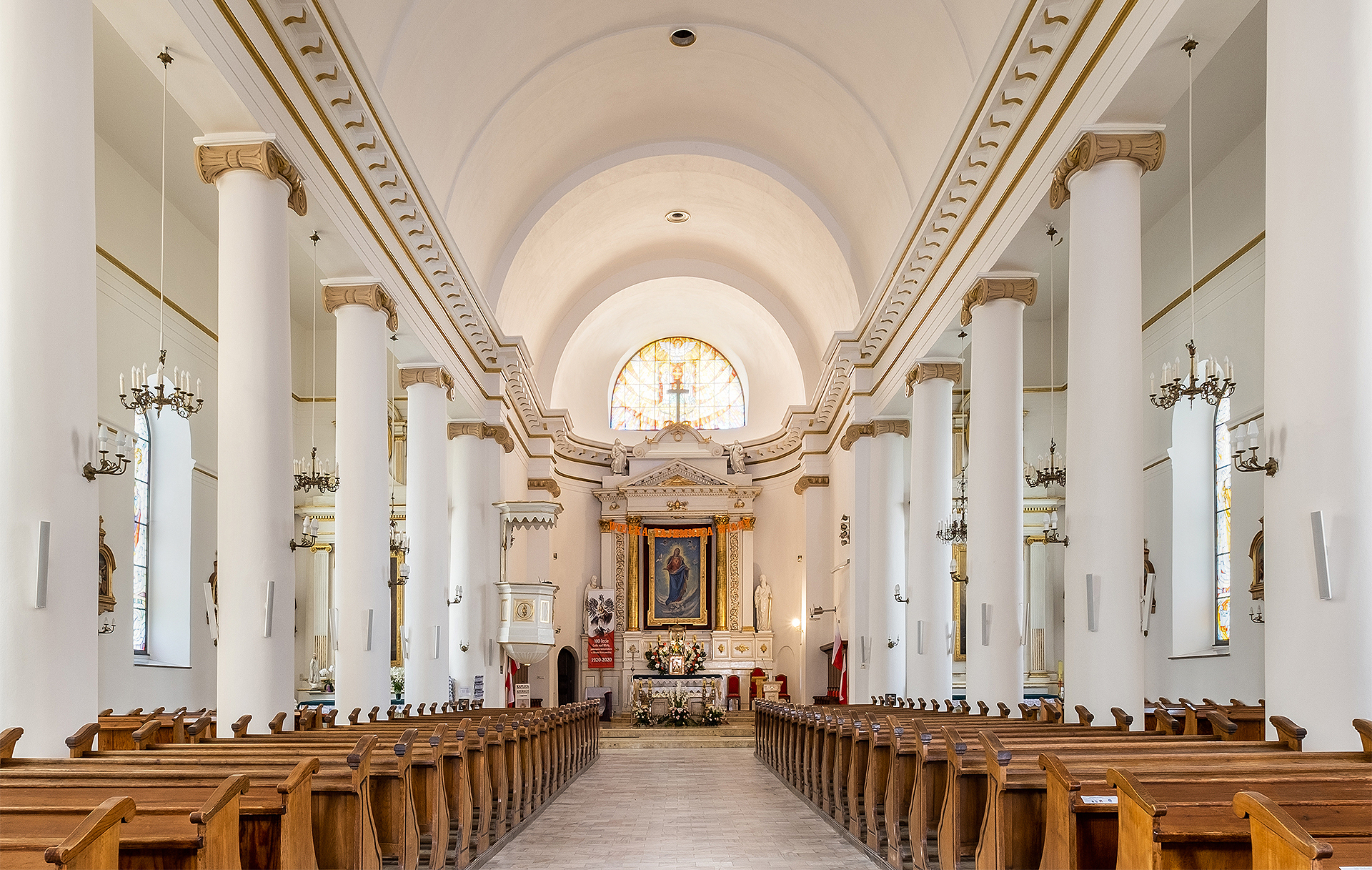
Entrance to the Church

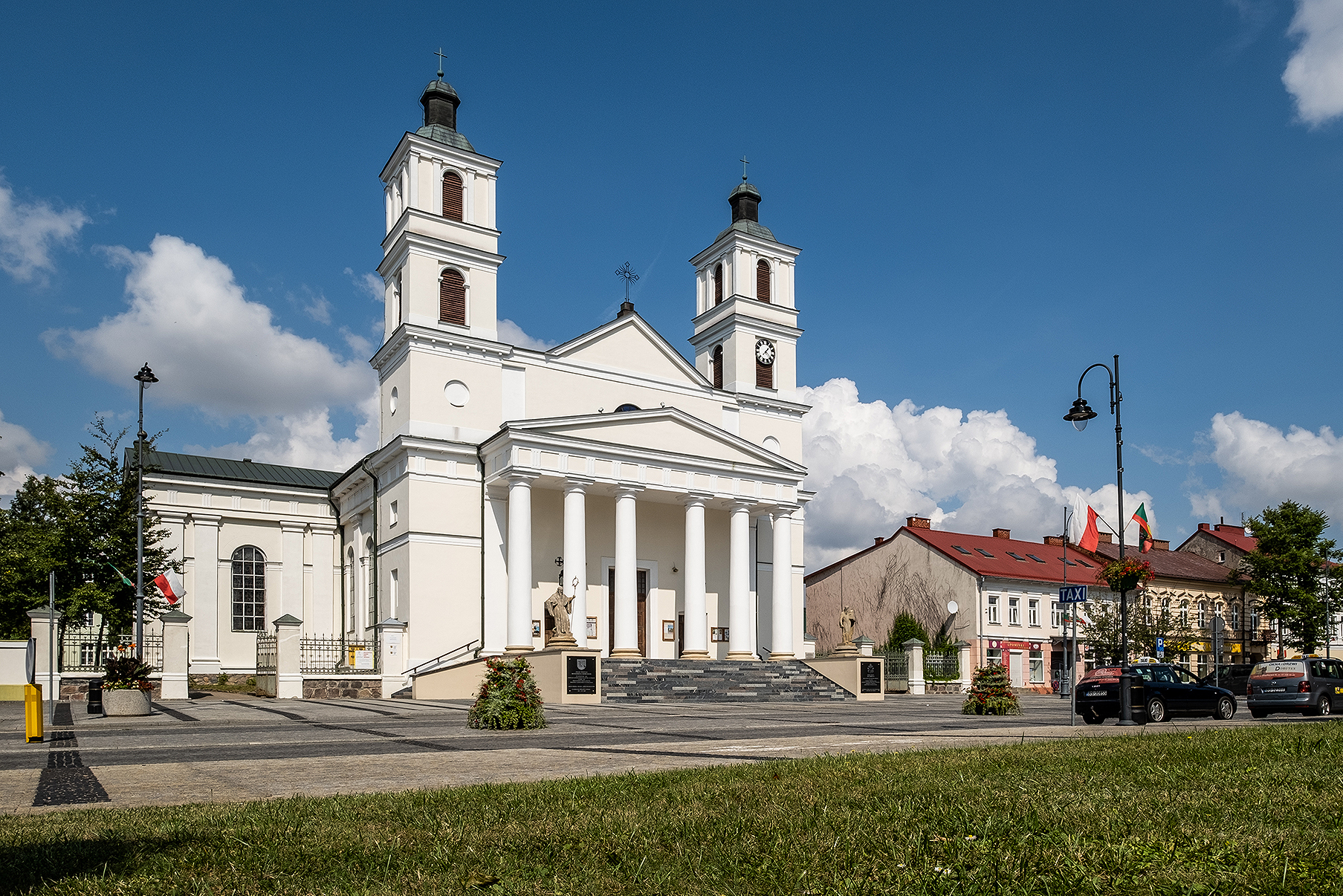
Exterior of the Church

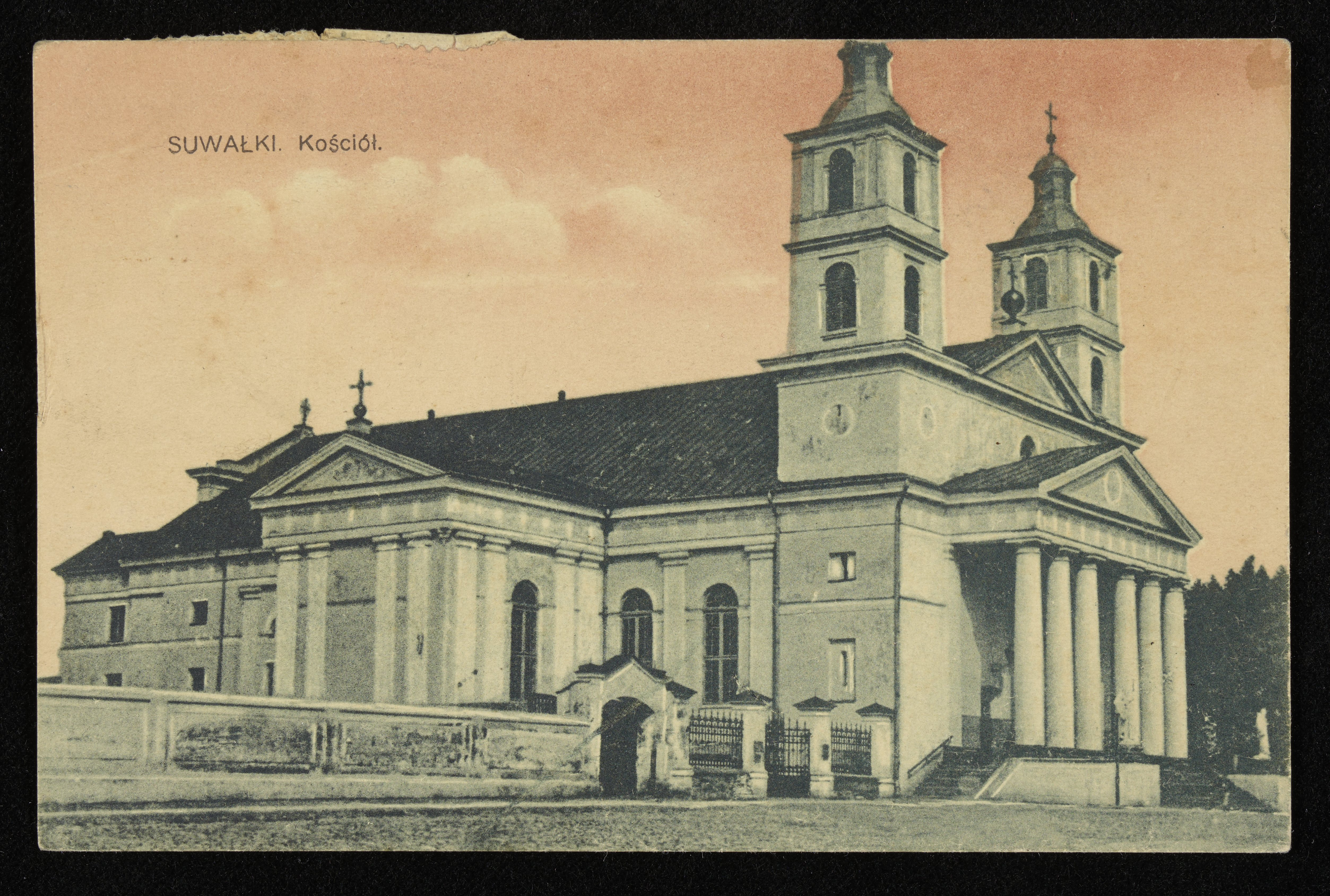
The Church in 1906
