= Immaculate Heart of Mary Cathedral, Irkutsk =

Coordinates: 52.2628°N 104.2572°E

Immaculate Heart of Mary Cathedral
- Собор Непорочного Сердца Божией Матери
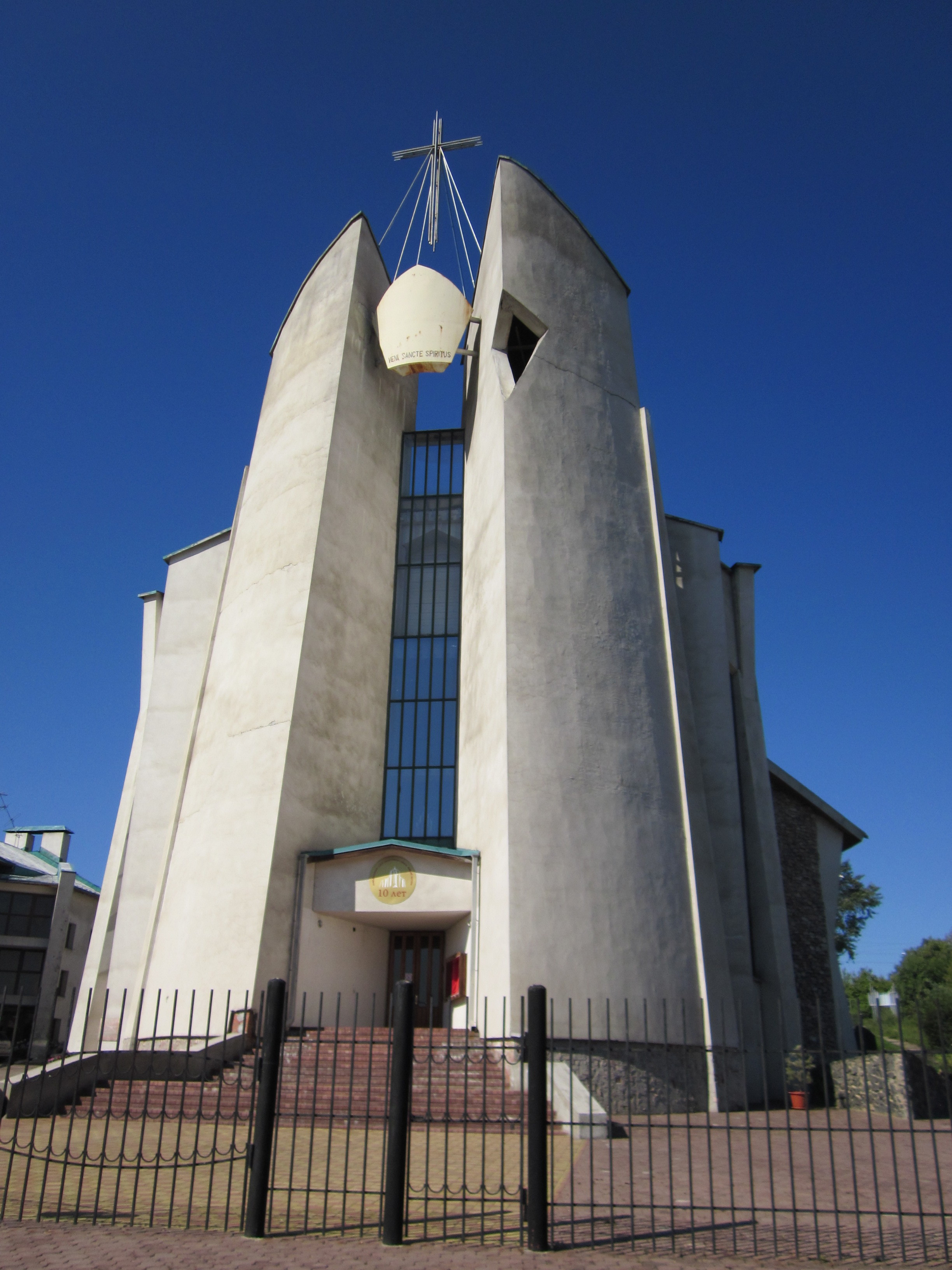
- Immaculate Heart of Mary Cathedral
- Location: Irkutsk
- Country: Russia
- Denomination: Roman Catholic Church

The Immaculate Heart of Mary Cathedral (Russian: Собор Непорочного Сердца Божией Матери)is the cathedral of the Roman Catholic Diocese of Saint Joseph at Irkutsk. It is located at 11 Griboyedov St. in Irkutsk, in the region of Siberia in Russia. It is known for its organ concerts. In 1820 a Roman Catholic parish was founded in Irkutsk, which was then a growing city. Most parishioners were Poles, Lithuanians, or Belarusians, but membership included representatives of many of the Russian Empire's ethnic groups. A wooden church was later dedicated to Our Lady of the Assumption, but burned down during the Great Fire of Irkutsk in 1879. A new Gothic church was consecrated in 1886. The parish was suppressed in Soviet times, during which the priests were arrested and sent to the camps.

After the fall of the Soviet Union the new Russian government permitted religious activities to resume. However, in 1998 the city of Irkutsk declined to return what had been church property to local Catholic religious groups, but instead gave them a plot of land on which to build a cathedral, which was consecrated on September 8, 2000.

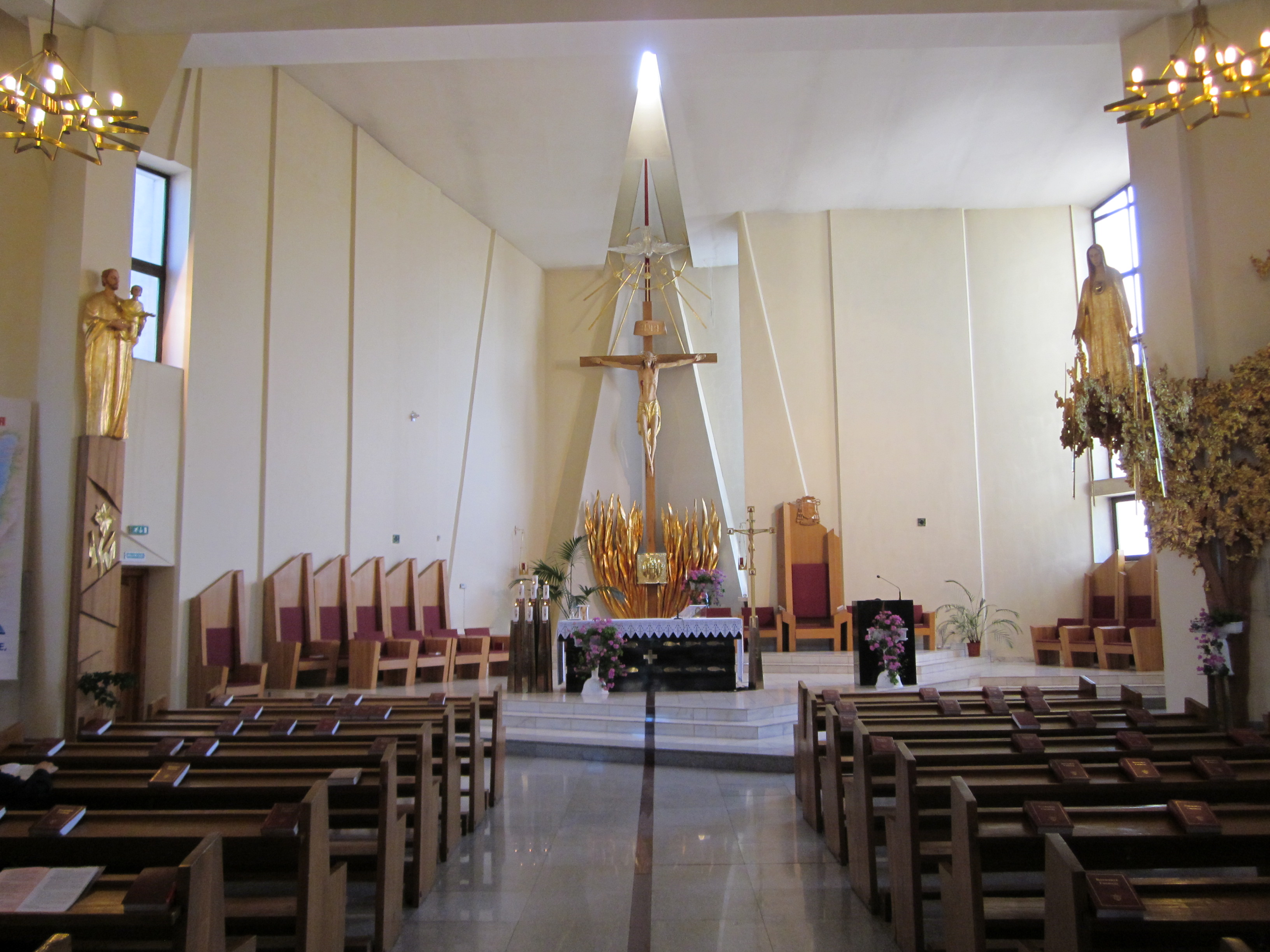
internal view

== See also ==
- Roman Catholicism in Russia
- Roman Catholic Diocese of Saint Joseph at Irkutsk
