= Amangeldy Aytaly =

Kazakh academic and politician (1939–2022)

Amangeldı Aitaly
- Амангелді Айталы

Member of the Mäjilis
- In office 1 December 1999 – 20 June 2007

Personal details
- Born: 10 September 1939 Volodarsky District, Astrakhan Okrug, Stalingrad Oblast, Russian SFSR, Soviet Union
- Died: 21 December 2022 (aged 83)
- Education: Atyrau State University; Al-Farabi Kazakh National University
- Occupation: Professor

Amangeldı Äbdırahmanūly Aitaly (Note: Often transliterated as Amangeldy Abdyrahmanuly Aytaly through a Russified Romanization of Амангельды Абдырахманулы Айталы.) (Kazakh: Амангелді Әбдірахманұлы Айталы; 10 September 1939 – 21 December 2022) was a Kazakh academic and politician. A member of the Agrarian and Civic Union of Workers Bloc, he served in the Mäjilis from 1999 to 2007.

Aytaly died on 21 December 2022, at the age of 83.
