= Diocese of Ełk =

Roman Catholic diocese in Poland

Coordinates: 53°49′13″N 22°21′17″E

Diocese of Ełk Dioecesis Liccanensis Diecezja Ełcka

Catholic
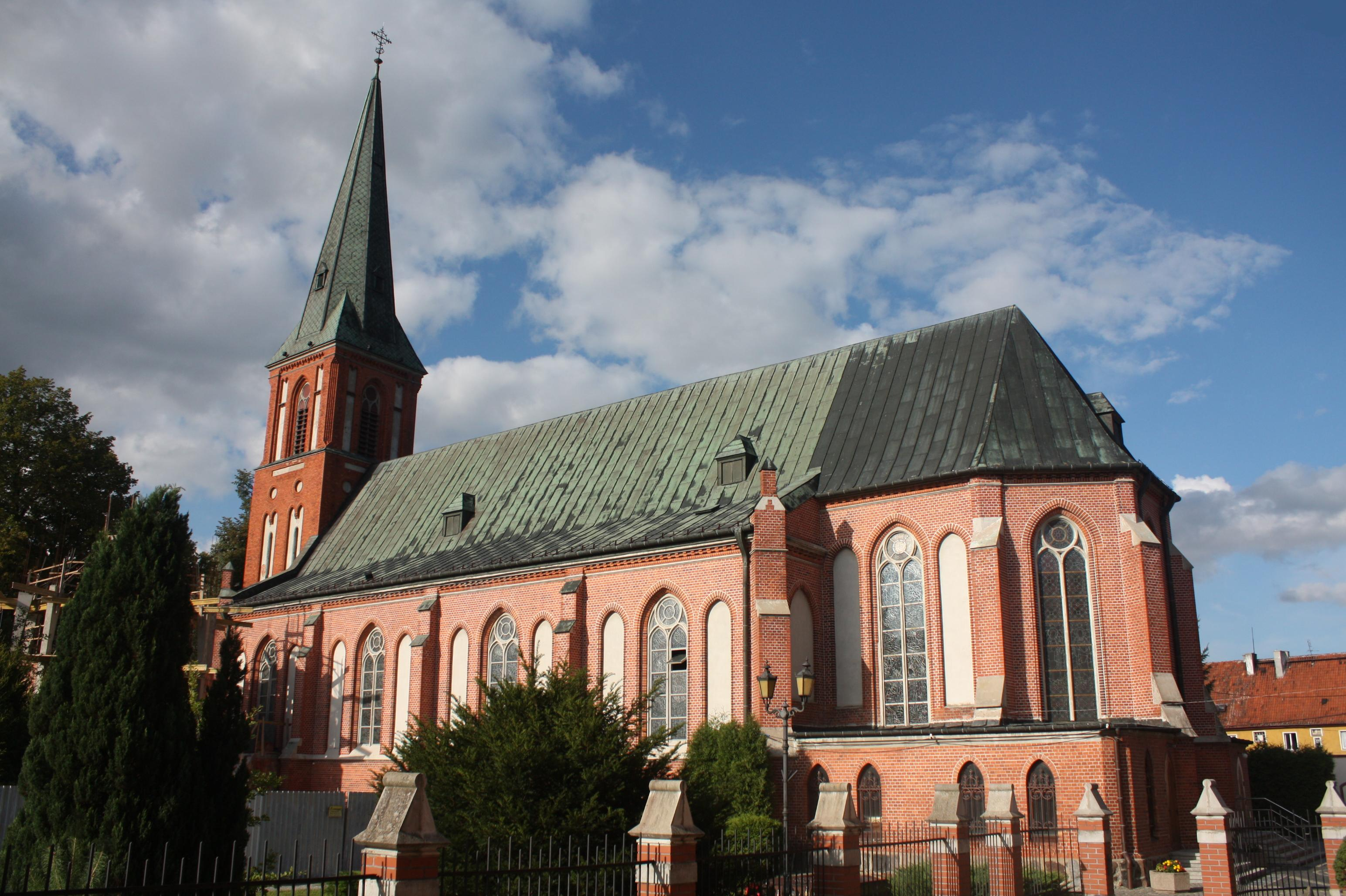
- Ełk Cathedral

Location
- Country: Poland
- Ecclesiastical province: Warmia
- Metropolitan: Warmia

Statistics
- Area: 11,000 km^{2} (4,200 sq mi)
- Population: Total; Catholics: (as of 2021); 467,620; 425,907 (91.1%)

Information
- Denomination: Catholic Church
- Rite: Latin Rite
- Established: 25 March 1992
- Cathedral: Katedra św. Wojciecha
- Co-cathedral: Konkatedra NMP Matki Kościoła, Gołdap & Konkatedra św. Aleksandra, Suwałki

Current leadership
- Pope: Leo XIV
- Bishop: Jerzy Mazur, S.V.D.
- Metropolitan Archbishop: Józef Górzyński
- Auxiliary Bishops: Dariusz Zalewski

Website
- Website of the Diocese

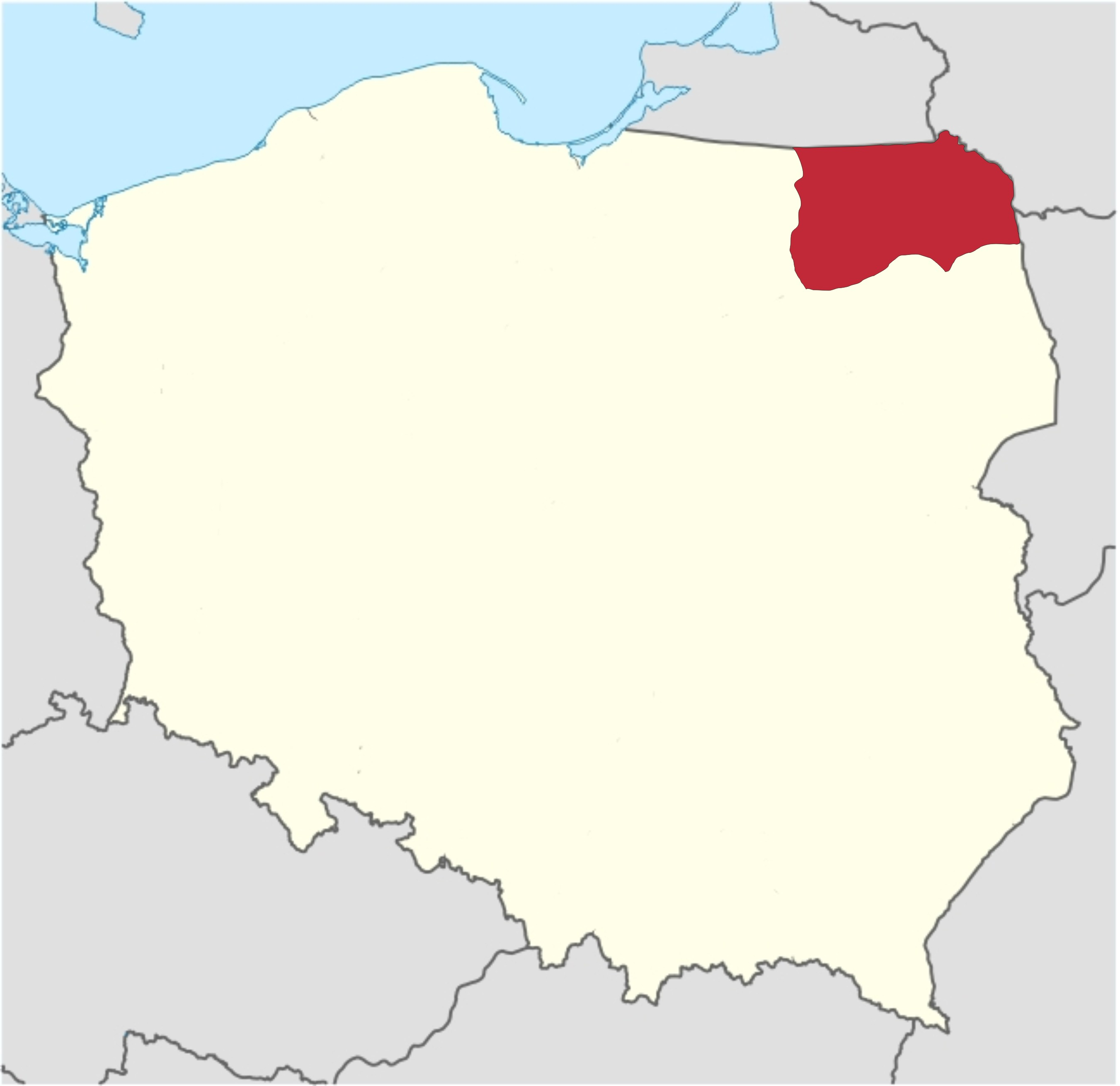
Map of Roman Catholic Diocese of Elk

The Diocese of Ełk (Latin: Dioecesis Liccanensis) is a Latin Church diocese of the Catholic Church located in the city of Ełk in the ecclesiastical province of Warmia in Poland.

== History ==
- March 25, 1992: Established as Diocese of Ełk from the Diocese of Łomża and Diocese of Warmia

== Significant churches ==
- Cathedral: Katedra św. Wojciecha, Ełk (St. Wojciech Cathedral)
- Co-Cathedral: Konkatedra NMP Matki Kościoła, Gołdap (Our Lady Mother of Church Concathedral)
- Co-Cathedral: Konkatedra św. Aleksandra, Suwałki (St. Alexander Concathedral)
- Minor Basilica: Bazylika Najświętszego Serca Jezusowego, Augustów (Most Holy Heart of Jesus Basilica)

== Bishops ==
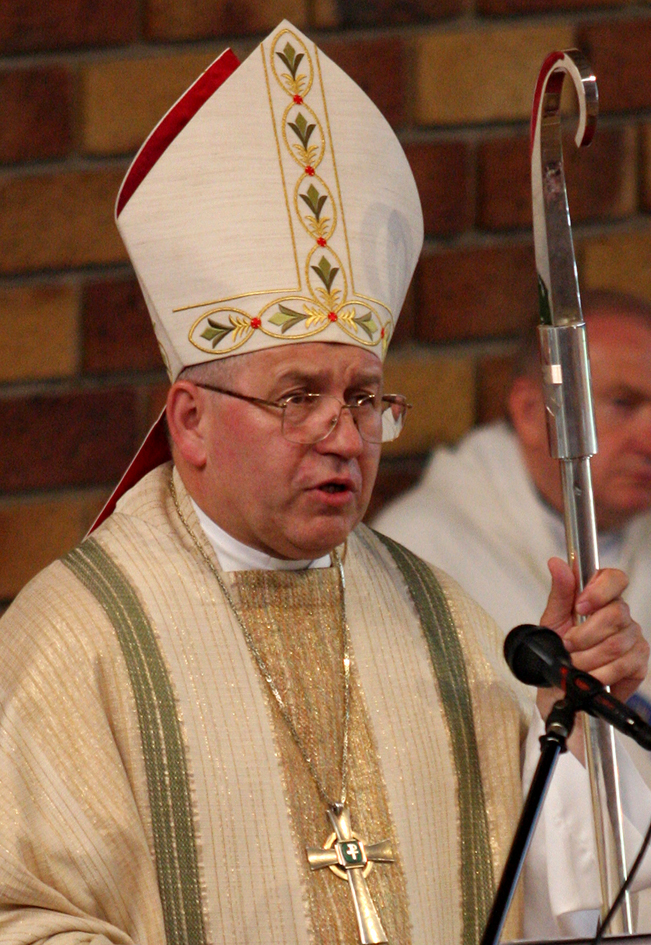
Current bishop Jerzy Mazur

- Bishops of Ełk (Roman rite)
  - Bishop Wojciech Ziemba (1992.03.25 – 2000.11.16), appointed Archbishop of Białystok
  - Bishop Edward Samsel (2000.11.16 – 2003.01.17)
  - Bishop Jerzy Mazur, S.V.D. (since 2003.04.17)

=== Auxiliary bishops ===
- Romuald Kamiński (2005-2017), appointed Coadjutor Bishop of Warszawa-Praga
- Adrian Joseph Galbas, S.A.C. (2020-2022) appointed Coadjutor Archbishop of Katowice
- Dariusz Zalewski (since 2022.10.29)

== See also ==
- Roman Catholicism in Poland

== Sources ==
- GCatholic.org
- Catholic Hierarchy
- Diocese website
