= Diocese of Saint Joseph at Irkutsk =

Roman Catholic diocese in Russia

Diocese of Saint Joseph at Irkutsk Dioecesis Ircutscana Sancti Iosephi Епархия Святого Иосифа в Иркутске
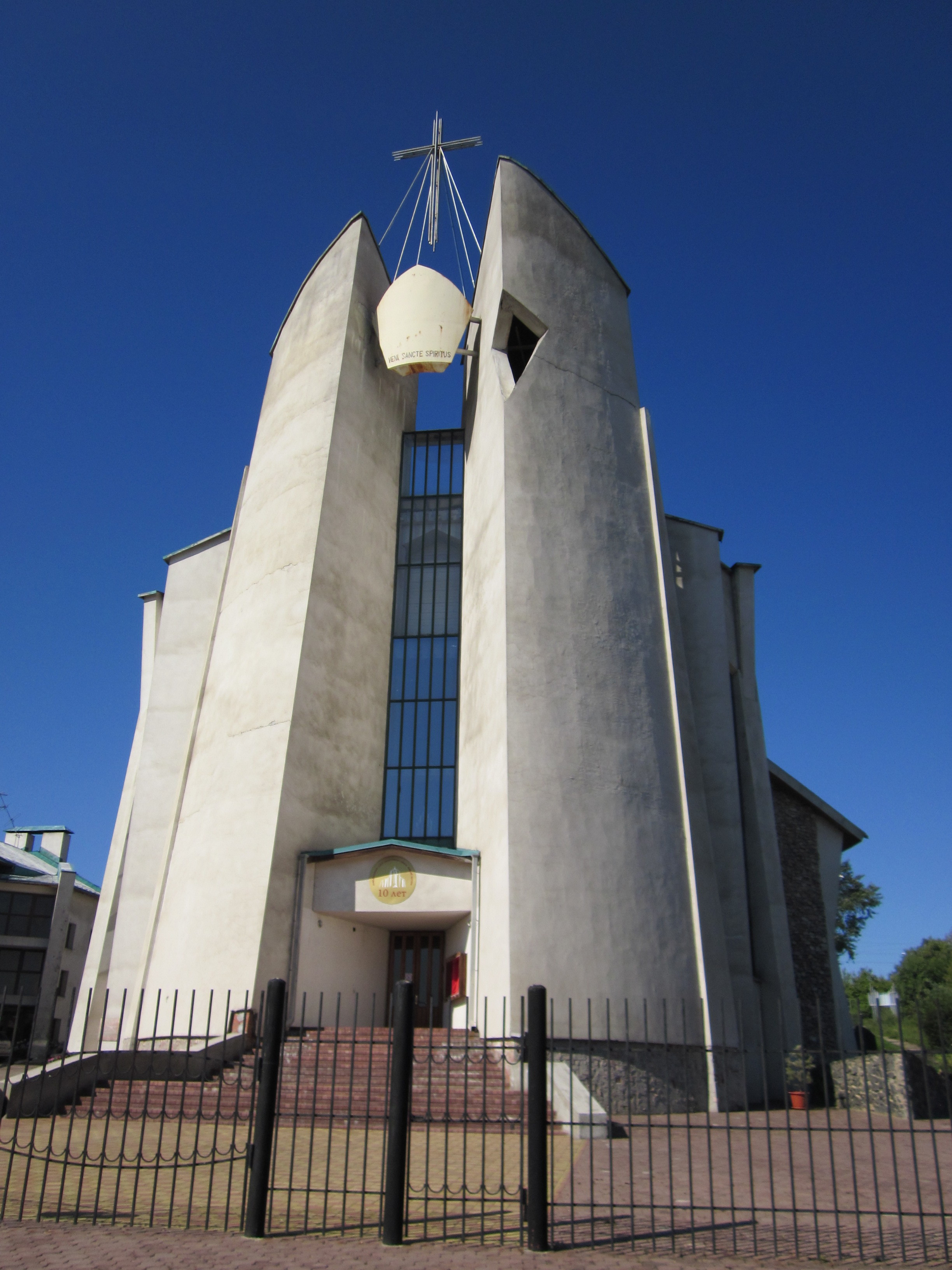
- Cathedral of the Immaculate Heart of Mary

Location
- Country: Russia
- Metropolitan: Roman Catholic Archdiocese of Mother of God at Moscow
- Coordinates: 52°15′46″N 104°15′26″E

Statistics
- Area: 9,960,000 km^{2} (3,850,000 sq mi)
- Population: Total; Catholics: (as of 2004); 15,500,000; 52,000 (0.3%)

Information
- Rite: Latin Rite
- Cathedral: Cathedral of the Immaculate Heart of Mary

Current leadership
- Pope: Leo XIV
- Bishop: Cyryl Klimowicz

Map
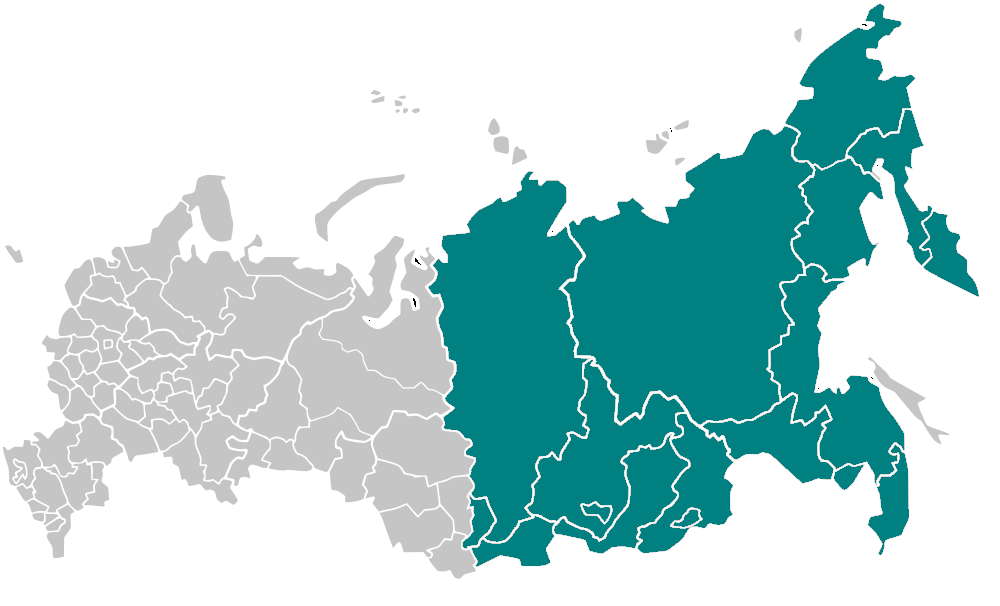

The Diocese of Saint Joseph at Irkutsk (Latin: Ircutscana Sancti Iosephi) is a Latin Church diocese of the Catholic Church located in the city of Irkutsk, which is part of the ecclesiastical province of the Mother of God at Moscow in Russia. The Diocese of Irkutsk is the largest geographical Catholic bishopric on earth, covering an area of 9,960,000 km^{2}. The Catholic population of the diocese is estimated to be about 53,000. It has 42 parishes served by about 42 priests. The bishop is Cyryl Klimowicz, a Pole. The diocese is divided into five deaneries: Irkutsk, Krasnoyarsk, Yakutsk, Vladivostok and Magadan.

== History ==
- May 18, 1999: Established as Apostolic Administration of Siberia Orientale from Apostolic Administration of Siberia (now Roman Catholic Diocese of the Transfiguration at Novosibirsk)
- February 11, 2002: Promoted as Diocese of Saint Joseph (located at San Giuseppe an Irkutsk)

== Special churches ==
- Former cathedral
  - Church of the Most Holy Mother of God in Vladivostok, Russia

== Episcopal ordinaries ==
(all Roman Rite)

=== Apostolic Administrators of Siberia Orientale ===
- Jerzy Mazur, SVD (18 May 1999 – 11 February 2002)

=== Bishops of Saint Joseph at Irkutsk ===
1. Jerzy Mazur, SVD (11 February 2002 – 17 April 2003)
2. Cyryl Klimowicz (17 April 2003 – )

== See also ==
- Roman Catholicism in Russia
- List of Roman Catholic dioceses in Russia
- Immaculate Heart of Mary Cathedral, Irkutsk

== Sources ==
- GCatholic.org
- Catholic Hierarchy
