= Liliya Moshechkova =

Lilija Moshechkova, Konfederacji KORWiN Braun Liroy Narodowcy

Lilija Moshechkova (Russian: Лилия Мошечкова; born July 19, 1969), also known as Liliya Moshechkova, is a Polish politician and former member of Confederation Liberty and Independence party. She was a candidate for election to the European Parliament in 2015.

== Biography ==
From 1976 to 1984 she attended schools in Donetsk, then continued her education in Donetsk Construction College (Russian: Донецкий строительный техникум) (1984–1988), and 37 Liceum in Donetsk. After that, she studied at Minsk Innovation University (Russian: МИУ, Минский инновационный университет) and Belorussian Commercial Law Institute (Russian: БКИУ, Белорусский коммерческий институт управления) from 1995 to 2001.

=== Political career ===
In 2014, she applied for the position of councillor of Warsaw's Ochota district, but was not elected. One year later, from the KORWiN party list, she ran, also unsuccessfully, for a parliamentary seat from Podlasie.

While working with the Confederation Liberty and Independence political coalition, she appeared on Channel One Russia.

== Opinions on Russia ==
Moshechkova supported the ride of the Russian motorcycle club Night Wolves to Poland and has opposed the removal of Soviet monuments in Poland that were dedicated to soldiers.

== Opinions on Ukraine ==
She participated in the protest together with Falanga (organisation) and Camp of Great Poland against the visit of president Petro Poroshenko. Lilija Moshechkova has openly bragged about relations with separatists in Donbass She was accused of funding the Russian separatist forces in Ukraine with 32689,64 PLN with help of The Orthodox Brotherhood of Sts. Cyril and Methodius in Poland Białystok

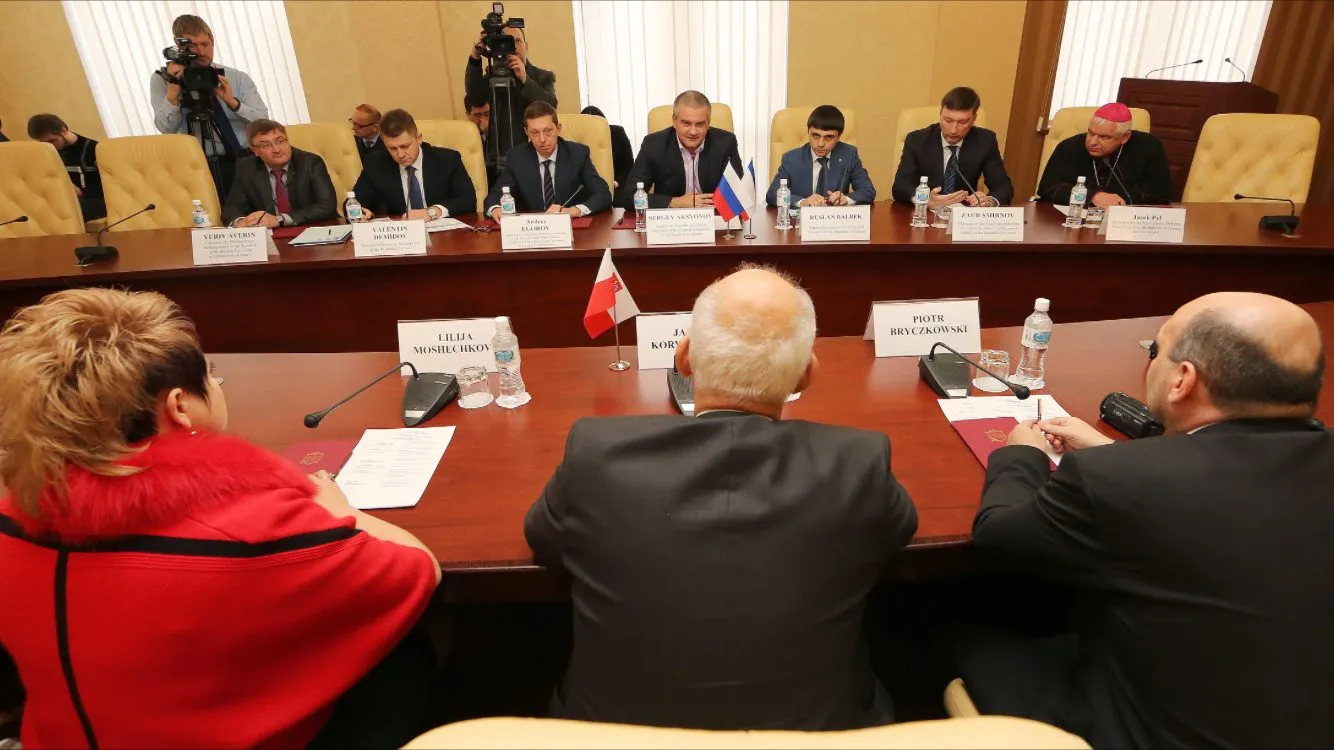
The visit of Janusz Korwin-Mikke to Crimea: BACK: Liliya Moshechkova, Janusz Korwin-Mikke, Piotr Bryczkowski // Front: Yuriy Averin, Valentin Demidov, Andrey Egorov, Sergey Aksyonov, Ruslan Balbek, Смирнов Заур Русланович, Jacek Pyl
