= St. Liborius Church, Krasnodar =

Coordinates: 45.0552°N 39.0281°E

St. Liborius Church
- Церковь Святого Либория
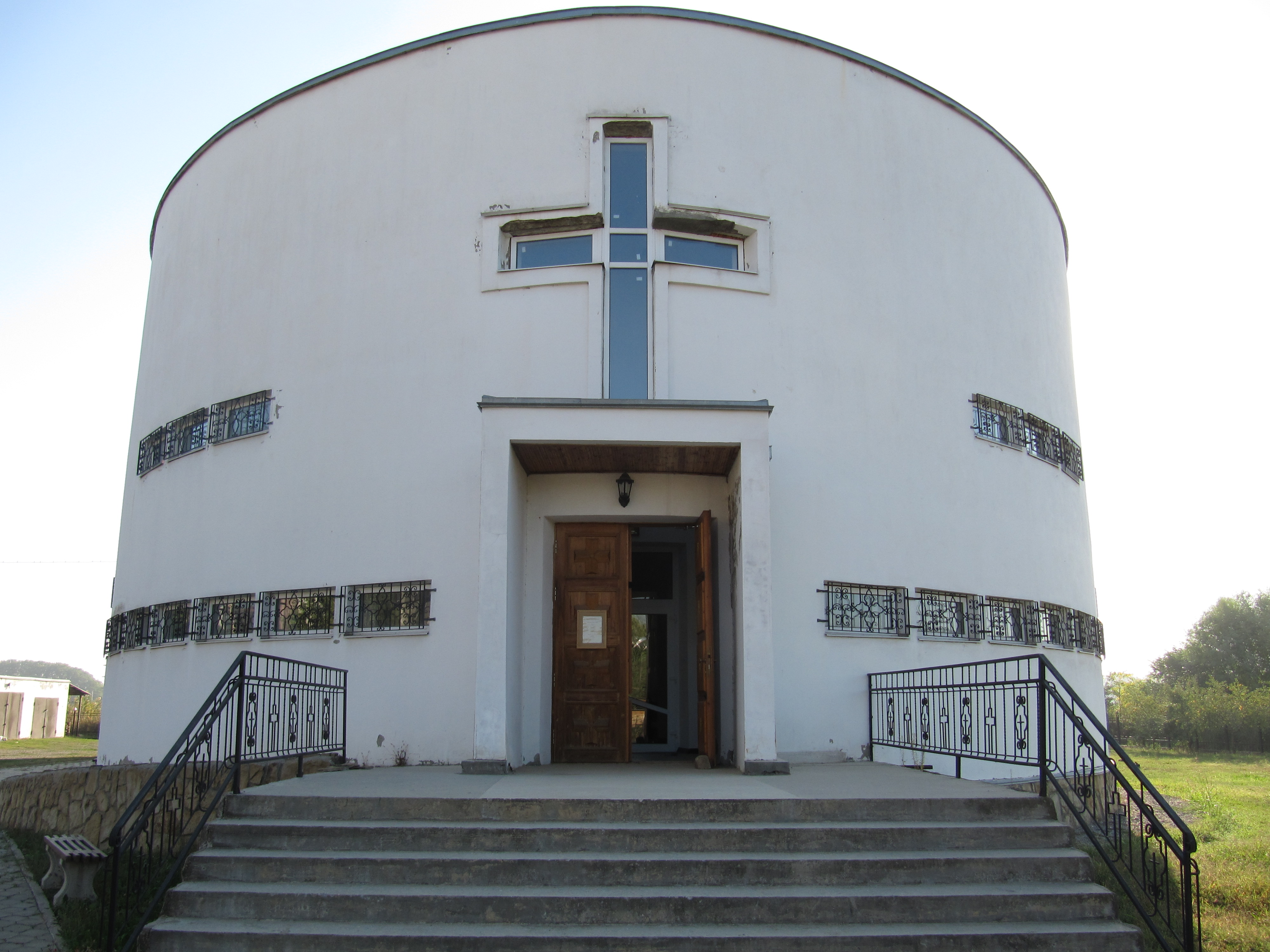
- St. Liborius Church
- Location: Krasnodar
- Country: Russia
- Denomination: Roman Catholic Church

Administration
- Diocese: Saratov

The St. Liborius Church (Russian: Церковь Святого Либория) is a Catholic church in Krasnodar, Russia, which is a member of the Diocese of Saint Clement at Saratov.

== History ==
In 1880 the Catholics of Ekaterinodar (the name of Krasnodar at the time) began raising funds for the construction of a church. The first stone of the church, dedicated to the Holy Rosary and St. Barbara, was laid in 1893 and the church was consecrated on June 15, 1907 by Bishop Josef Alois Kessler (1862-1933). The number of parishioners, who were largely Germans and Poles, amounted to 2,500 in 1914. There is also a large minority of Catholic Armenians of Kuban that grew after the Armenian genocide by the Ottomans.

The church was closed by the communist authorities in 1937 and became a residential building. After the fall of communism in 1990, the parish was registered again in 1992. He received a plot of land in 1996 to build a new church, which was consecrated by the apostolic nuncio to St. Liborius, on 14 November 1999. Today day most of the parishioners are Armenian Catholics. They are helped by the sisters of the Congregation of the Servants of Jesus in the Eucharist, founded in 1923 by Monsignor Georges Matulewicz (1871-1927).

== See also ==
- Catholic Church in Russia
