= St. Peter and St. Paul Cathedral, Saratov =

Coordinates: 51.5275°N 46.0447°E

St. Peter and St. Paul Cathedral
- Собор Святых Апостолов Петра и Павла
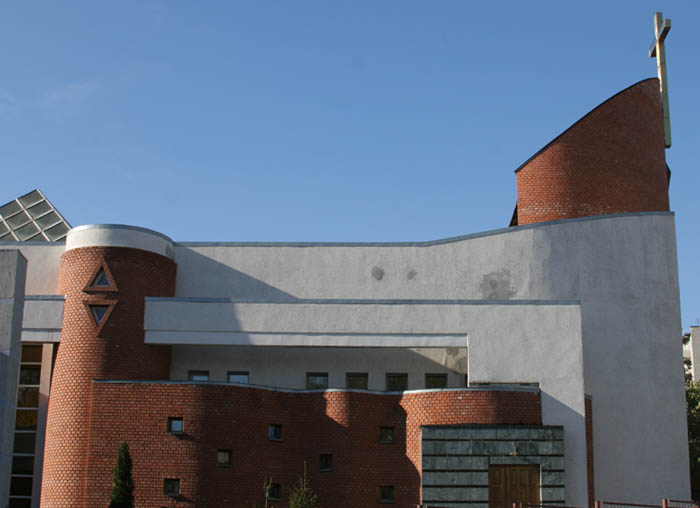
- St. Peter and St. Paul Cathedral
- Location: Saratov
- Country: Russia
- Denomination: Roman Catholic Church

Administration
- Diocese: Roman Catholic Diocese of Saint Clement at Saratov

The Cathedral of St. Peter and St. Paul (Russian: Собор Святых Апостолов Петра и Павла) is the cathedral of the Catholic Diocese of Saint Clement at Saratov, in Saratov Oblast, Russia.

From the mid-nineteenth century, Saratov served as the seat of the Bishop of Tiraspol in Imperial Russia. Although the Bishop was not resident in Tiraspol, the diocese jurisdiction over southern Russia and Siberia. At that time, the city had large populations of ethnic Poles and Volga Germans, the latter having settled in the region since the late eighteenth century. The first Catholic church was built in 1805 in a small town growing with settlers from throughout the Empire.

During Soviet era, the catholic church faced persecution. After the dissolution of Soviet Union, the original church site was not returned to the Catholic community. As a result, a new church was built and consecrated to the Saints Peter and Paul in 2000 in the presence of the apostolic nuncio. It was elevated to cathedral status in 2002 with the establishment of the diocese.

== See also ==
- Catholic Church in Russia
- Brutalist_architecture
- Wreckovation

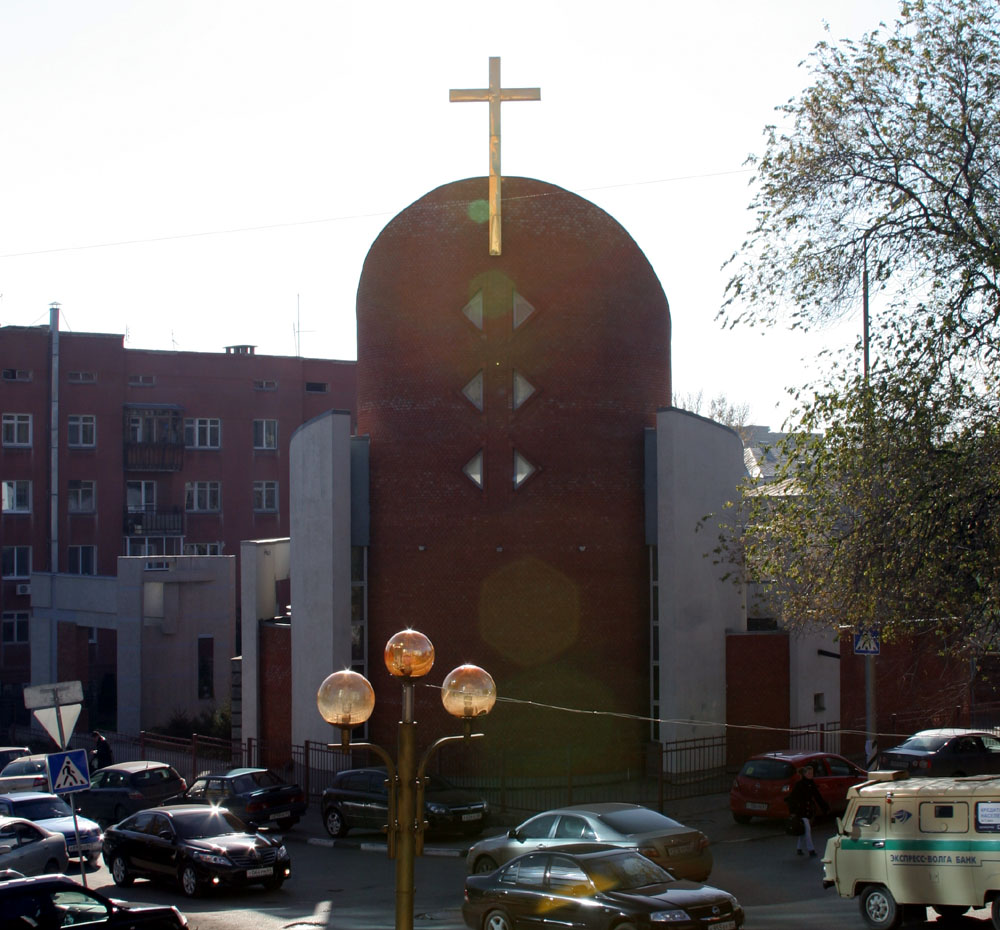
view of the façade
