= St. Nicholas' Church, Volgograd =

Coordinates: 48.7206°N 44.5294°E

St. Nicholas' Church
- Храм Святого Николая
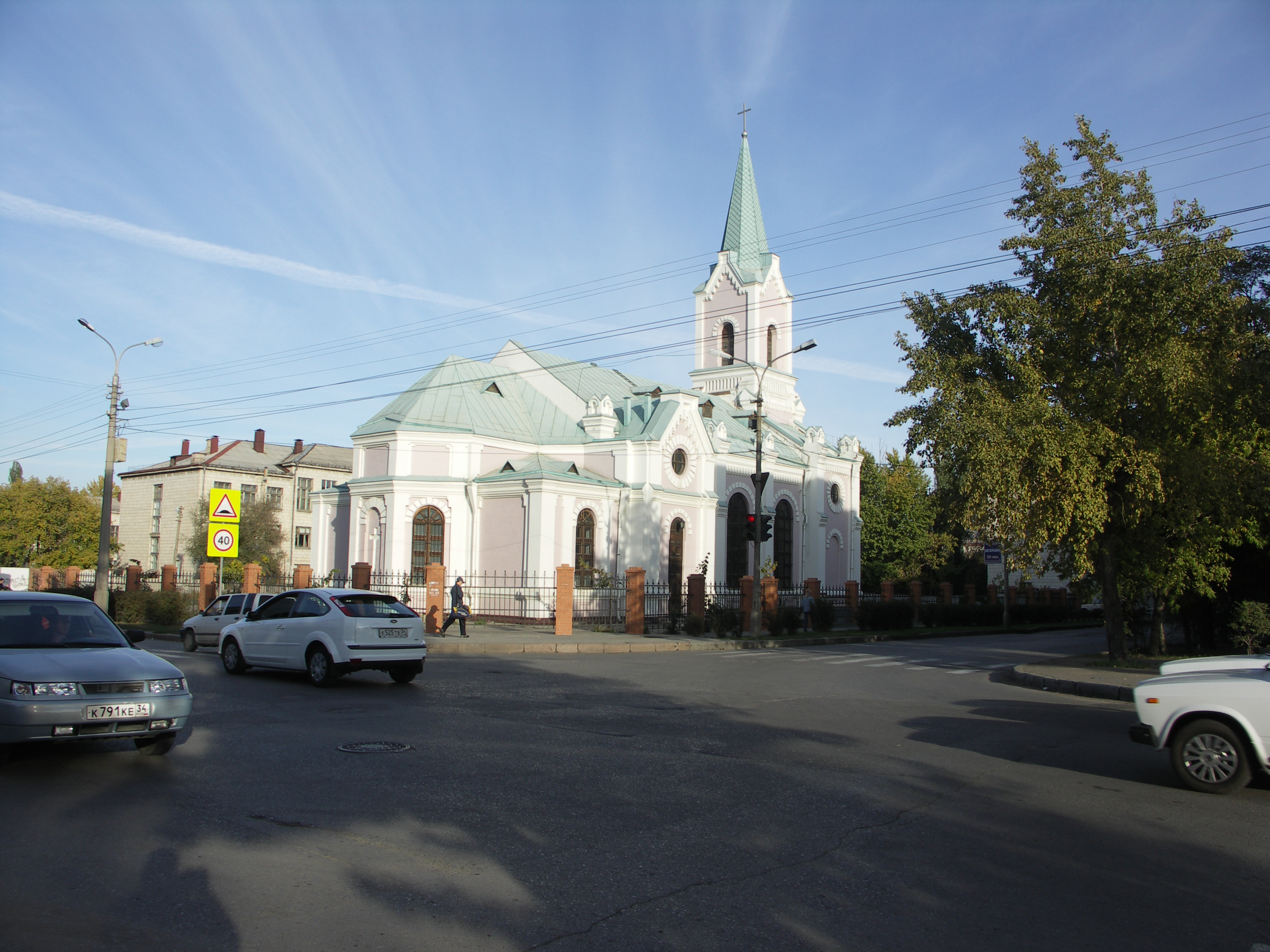
- St. Nicholas' Church
- Location: Volgograd
- Country: Russia
- Denomination: Roman Catholic Church

St. Nicholas' Church (Russian: Храм Святого Николая) is a parish of the Roman Catholic Church in the city of Volgograd, within the Diocese of St. Clement at Saratov in Russia.

== History ==
The church was built in 1899 in the neo-Gothic style, with a topped tower with a spire and side chapels dedicated to the Virgin Mary and St. Stanislaus.

Amidst anti-religious persecution, the church was closed by the Soviet authorities in 1930, looted and vandalized. It became a school in 1935 and then a meeting room. It was so damaged by the 1980s that it was set for demolition. After the Catholic Church in Volgograd (formerly Stalingrad) was recognized again officially in August 1991, Catholics returned six months later. Restoration of the church lasted more than five years.

Today it collaborates with the parish Caritas organization, the Pope John XXIII Association, and the Norbertine nuns.

On May 4, 1997 the church was consecrated in the name of Saint Nicholas of Myra.

The facade of the church has a pointed arch and a rosette above the main entrance. A tower with a spire was built in the Neo-Gothic style.

== See also ==
- Catholic Church in Russia
