= Roman Catholic Church of the Assumption of Mary, Mariupol =

Church of the Assumption of Mary
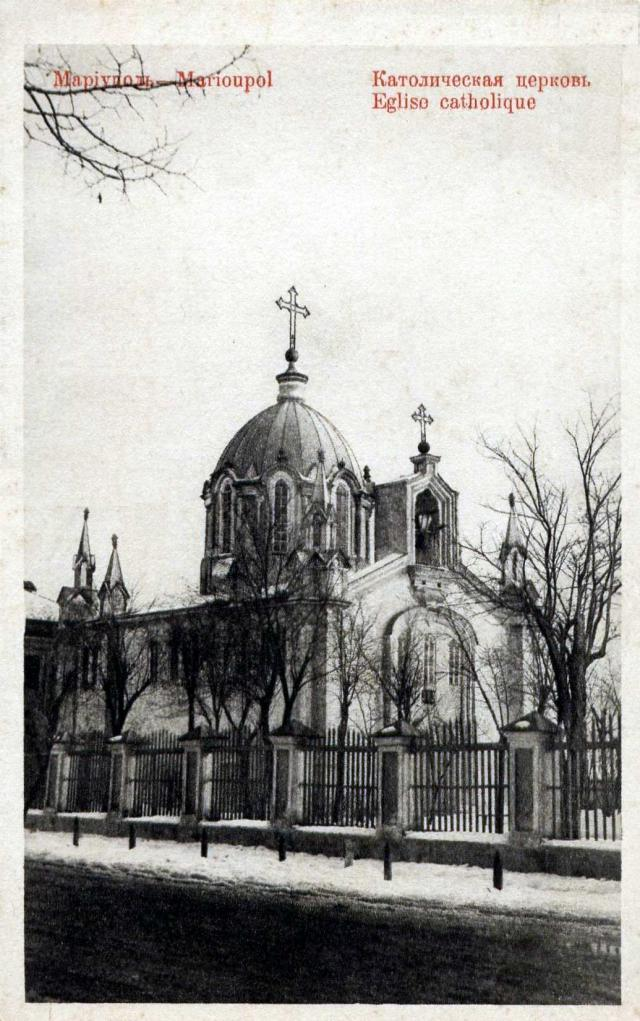
- Photo of the church taken before 1917

- Location within Ukraine
- 47°06′34″N 37°33′43.8″E
- Location: Mariupol
- Country: Ukraine

History
- Status: Church
- Dedication: Assumption of Mary

Architecture
- Functional status: destroyed
- Completed: 1860
- Demolished: 1936

Specifications
- Materials: Brick

Administration
- Diocese: Roman Catholic Diocese of Tiraspol

The Church of the Assumption of Mary (Ukrainian: костел Успіння Пресвятої Діви Марії) was a Roman Catholic church located on the corner of the Commercial Street (ukr: вулиця Торгова) and the Italian Street (ukr: вулиця Італійська) in the city of Mariupol in Ukraine, as part of the Russian Roman Catholic Diocese of Tiraspol. The church was consecrated to the Assumption of Mary.

== History ==
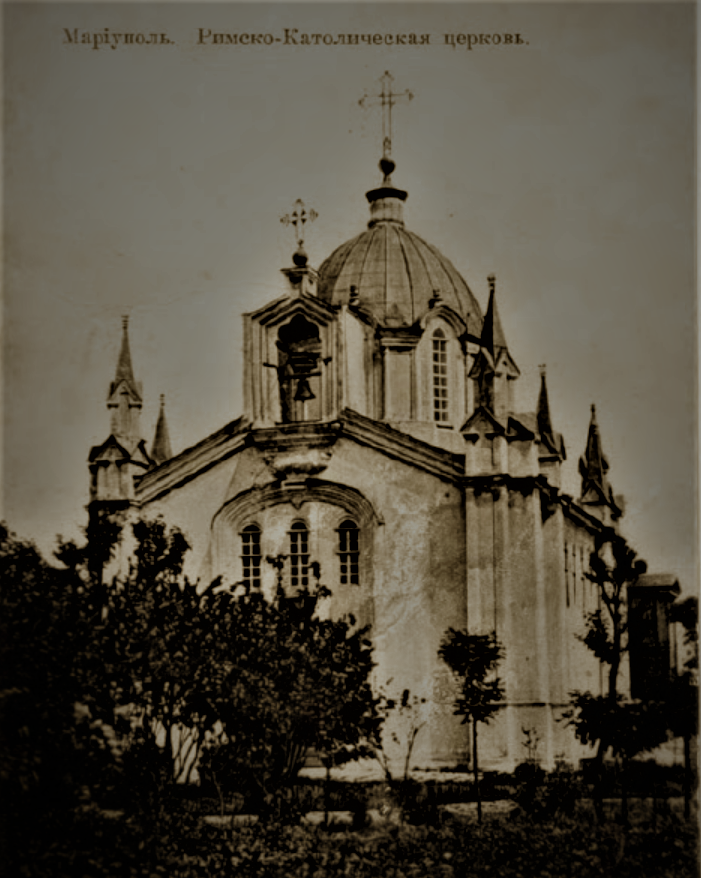

Italian Catholic settlement began in Mariupol in the 1820s. The first settlers were sea captains, followed by merchants.

The Italian Church parish community was founded in 1853, after priests from German-speaking areas preached there for a long time. The Italian community received permission to build their own church from Russian Emperor Nicholas I on 15 November 1853 in a decree signed at Gatchina. Thus it was possible to continue the construction in February 1854, which had initially begun on 5 November 1853. The funding of the construction was possible due to the sponsorship of Italian Catholics, who were active in trading primarily grain, but also citrus fruits and spices. They agreed to a voluntary tax on every quarter (210 liters) of grain they sold to build a church. At the time the name Italians also encompassed southern Slavic people of the Austrian Adriatic coast.

The Italian consul in the city, Gerbulini, and a businessman, Stepan Membeli, promoted the starting of the project and the continued construction. The painter Arkhip Kuindzhi was involved in registration of the bricks, but can be eliminated as being the architect, as he was 11 years old at the time. Due to the Crimean War the grain trade broke down and the construction of the church was halted. Further construction was then made possible due to a large donation from Italian King Vittorio Emanuele II. Construction was completed in 1860. The first service was on 18 October 1860, attended by Bishop Wincenty Lipski, the auxiliary bishop of the Roman Catholic Diocese of Tiraspol.

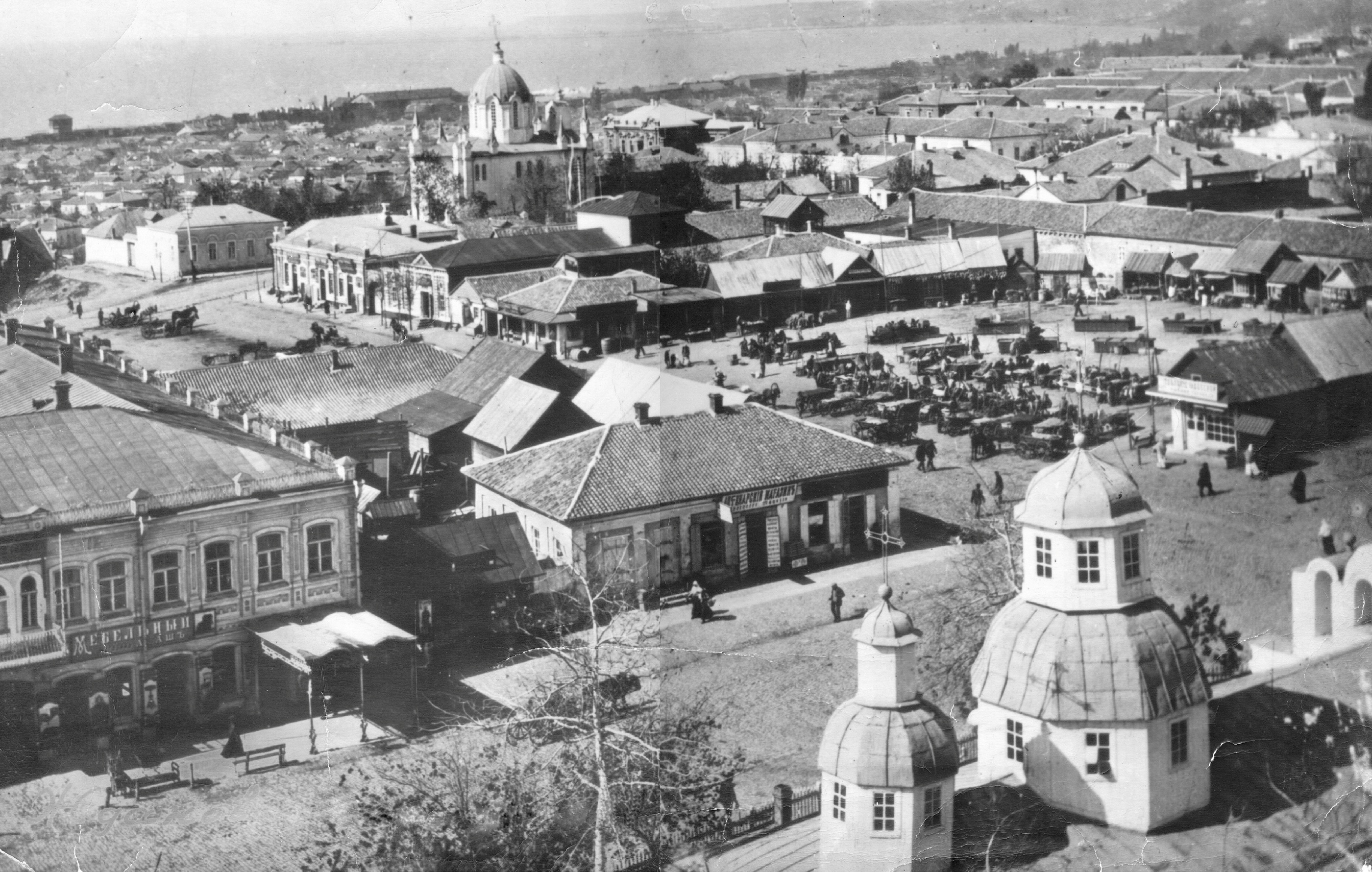

As the church was the only Catholic church in the city for a long time, it was only referred to as The Catholic Church (Russian: Католическая церковь or Католический костёл). In addition the church was known as The Italian Church, even long time after the decline of the Italian community.

As of 1919, the church had 3,500 parishioners, most of whom were not Italian.

The church was destroyed by the Soviet Union upon urge of the Union of the Godless of Ukraine (ukr: Спілка войовничих безвірників України), who belonged to the League of Militant Atheists. Like the Orthodox churches and the Jewish synagogue in the city, the Catholic church was looted and blown up in the early 1930s.

== Literature ==
- Teachers of the Alexandrovsk Male Gymnasium (1892). Timoshevski, Hrihorii Ivanovych (ed.). Мариуполь и его окрестности (Mariupol and its Surroundings). Mariupol: Frantov Letterpress

== See also ==
- Church of the Assumption of Mary, Mariupol (orthodox)
