= The Last Supper Church, Rostov-on-Don =

Coordinates: 47.2589°N 39.7036°E

The Last Supper Church
- Церковь Тайной Вечери
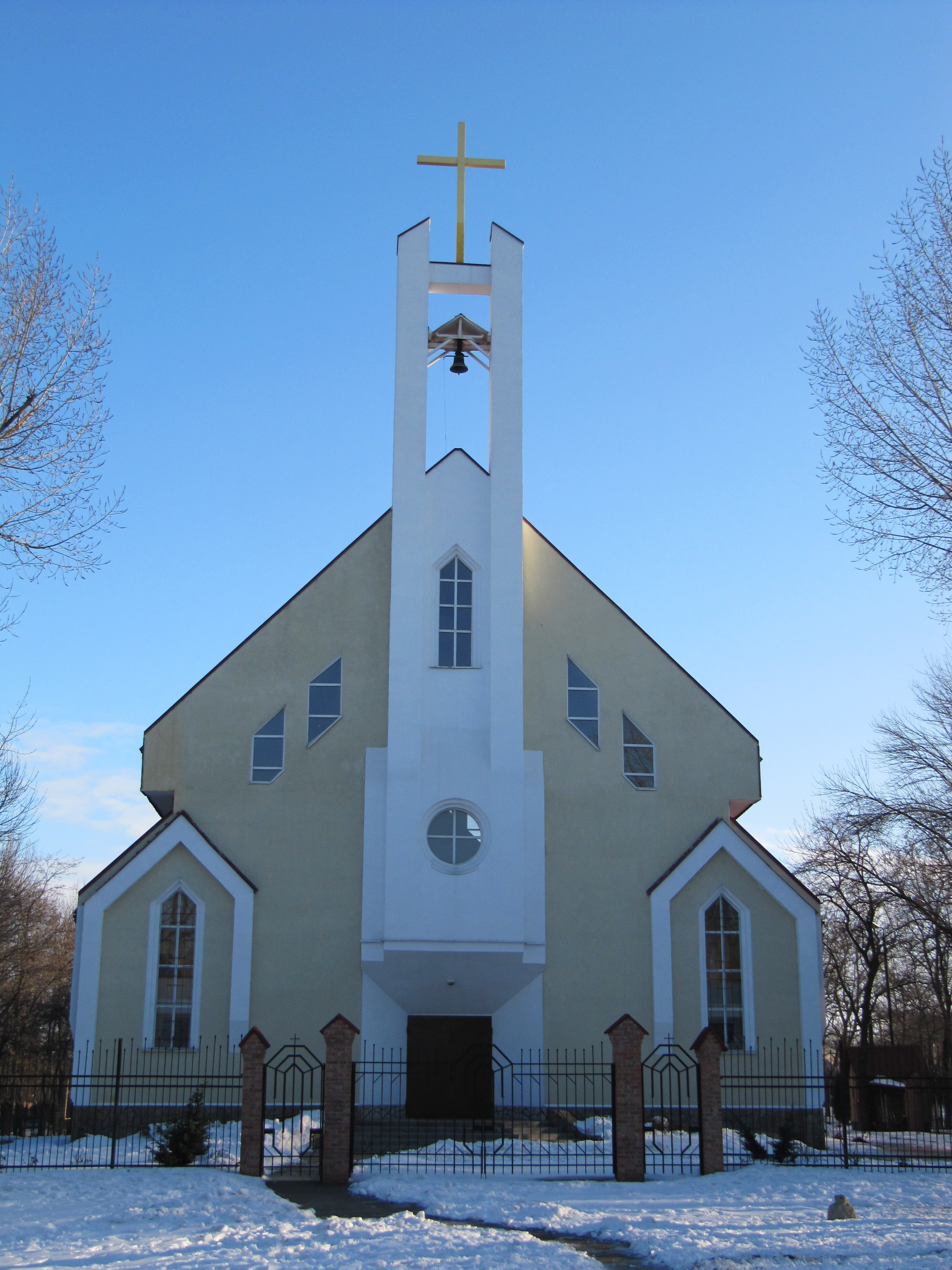
- The Last Supper Church
- Location: Rostov-on-Don
- Country: Russia
- Denomination: Roman Catholic Church

Administration
- Diocese: Roman Catholic Diocese of Saint Clement at Saratov

The Last Supper Church (Russian: Церковь Тайной Вечери) It is a Catholic church in Rostov-on-Don in Russia, which depends on the Diocese of Saratov.

== History ==
The history of the Catholic parish of Rostov-on-Don began in the second half of the nineteenth century. But like many churches in the country, Rostov church was destroyed by the Communists in the mid-twentieth century. The parish was reborn in 1992 when normal relations were established between the State and the various denominations after the fall of the Soviet Union.

The first stone of the present church was laid in the spring of 1999 and construction of the parish. The church was consecrated on September 19, 2004.

== See also ==
- Roman Catholicism in Russia
- The Last Supper

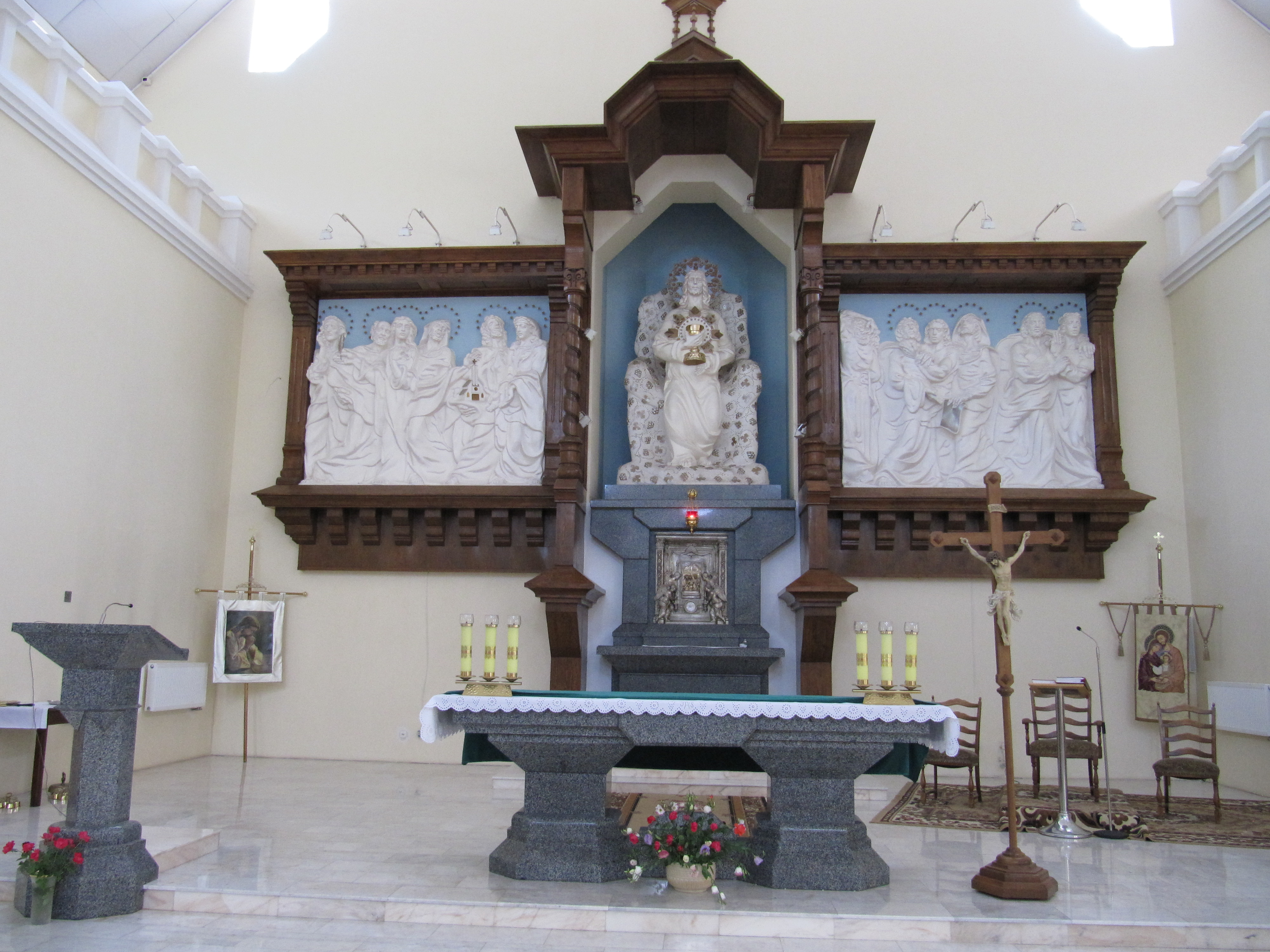
Internal view
