= Church of the Assumption of Mary (Astrakhan) =

- Church of the Assumption of the Holy Virgin Mary
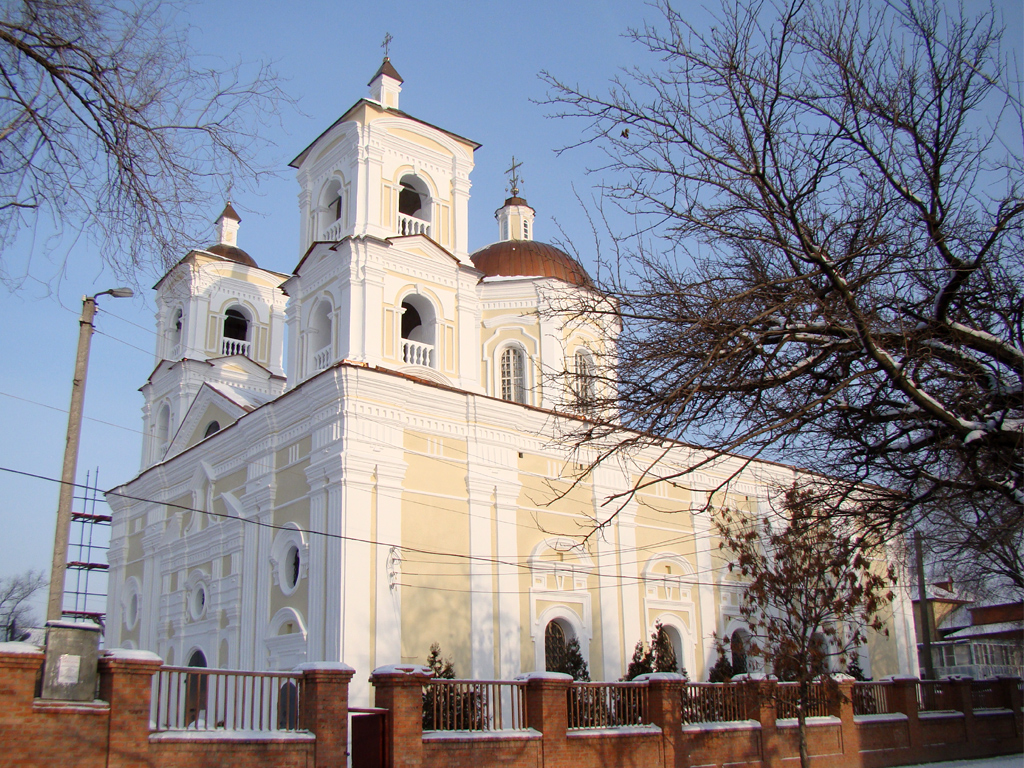
- Church of the Assumption of the Virgin

- Location within Russia
- 46°20′45″N 48°3′4″E
- Location: Astrakhan
- Country: Russia
- Denomination: Roman Catholic

History
- Status: Church
- Founded: 1721
- Dedication: Mary (mother of Jesus)
- Events: Reconstructed by the Soviets for civil purposes, 199x

Architecture
- Functional status: Active
- Architectural type: Basilica
- Style: Baroque, Classicism
- Years built: 1721
- Completed: 1762

Specifications
- Materials: Brick

Administration
- Diocese: Roman Catholic Diocese of Saint Clement at Saratov

Clergy
- Bishop: Clemens Pickel

The Church of the Assumption of Mary is a Catholic church in the city of Astrakhan. Administratively belongs to Astrakhan dean of the Diocese of St. Clement to the center of Saratov, headed by Bishop Clemens Pickel. It is located at Pobedy street, 3 (at the intersection with the Babushkina street). Franciscan Friars, including Rector Waldemar Mackiewicz, are assigned to the parish. Organ concerts are also held regularly.

== History ==
The first Catholics in Astrakhan appeared in the pre-Petrine era. After the appearance in 1702 of the decree "On the call of foreigners in Russia, promising them freedom of religion", a large community of foreign Catholics formed in Astrakhan. At the beginning of the 18th century, the city began to accept Capuchins. The exact date of construction of the first Catholic church in the city can not be established, it is known about the construction of the stone church in 1721. Astrakhan church was the third Catholic church in Russia after the churches of Moscow and St. Petersburg. In the church a Catholic school was opened, where the Russian poet Vasily Trediakovsky studied.

In 1762 on the site of the former temple construction was begun on a new one, far surpassing the old size. Construction was carried out long enough, in 1778 the church was solemnly consecrated.

In Soviet times the church was closed until the 1990s, after which control was returned to the Catholic Church.

== Architecture ==
Astrakhan Catholic Church of the Assumption - the most interesting architectural monument of the 18th century with the unusual for Russian architecture, combining the features of baroque, classical and traditional Russian church architectural techniques. In terms of the temple is a basilica Italian type, but a central part of the temple is made in the form of a quadrangle characteristic of Russian Orthodox architecture. The facade of the temple is bounded by two towers, belfries. Decoration of the facade bears the features of the late baroque and classicism.

== See also ==
- Russian Byzantine Catholic Church
