= Church of the Exaltation of the Holy Cross, Tambov =

Coordinates: 52.7141°N 41.4585°E

Church of the Exaltation of the Holy Cross
- Церковь Воздвижения Святого Креста
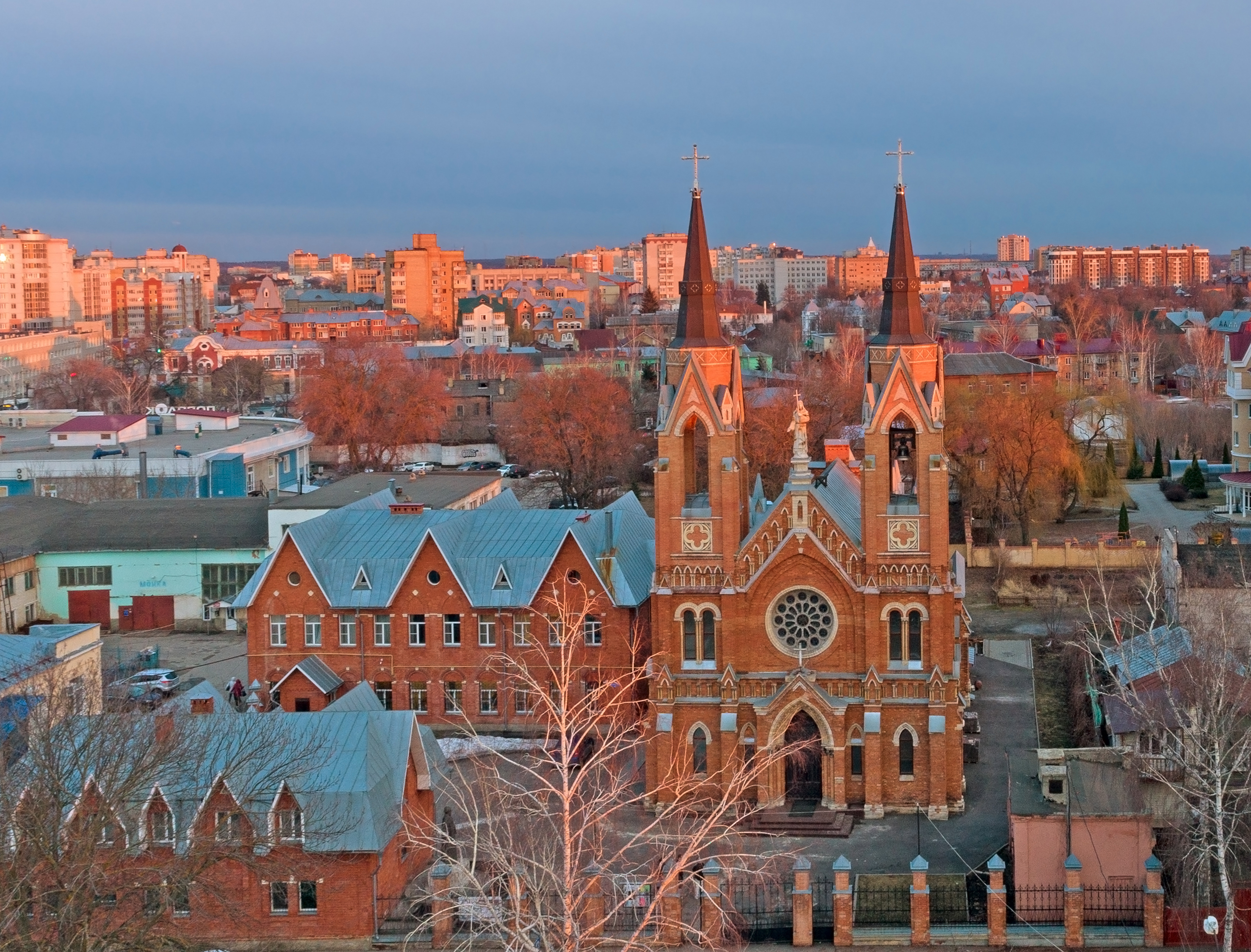
- Church of the Exaltation of the Holy Cross
- Location: Tambov
- Country: Russia
- Denomination: Roman Catholic Church

Administration
- Diocese: Roman Catholic Diocese of Saint Clement at Saratov

The Exaltation of the Holy Cross Church (Russian: Церковь Воздвижения Святого Креста) is a Catholic church, and a protected historical monument in the city of Tambov, Russia. It is in the Diocese of San Clemente at Saratov, and located at Kranstadtskaya 14. The church was begun in 1898 and was operating in 1903, although the finishing works continued for several more years. The church itself was built in the Gothic style, made of red brick, and richly decorated. Along with the church, a stone two-story house was built in which the Catholic charitable society, the library, and the abbot's quarters were located.

== History ==
The history of the Roman Catholic church in Tambov begins after the suppression of the Polish uprising in 1863, when thousands of Catholic Poles were deported to the Tambov region, where many eventually settled down. In 1896, the collection of funds for construction was started, and on May 25, 1903, the first church service was held, although there were only temporary altars, and there were no images and banners. Construction was done by Teofil Svirchevsky. A few years later, the interior decoration and installation of the icons was completed. The cathedral was made in the Gothic style, unique not only for Tambov, but for the entire central Russia. A parish was established in the church and a Catholic priest was appointed, who was subordinate to the Metropolitan of Mogilev.

In 1918, the first attempts were made to remove items from the church property. The library was closed at the beginning of the 1920s, the books were taken, and the priest, Casimir Verzhbitsky, was repressed.

After 1935, the community of believers disintegrated, and the church was no longer used for worship. In the postwar period, an attempt was made to transfer the church organ to another room, but after dismantling it proved impossible to reassemble. The building was used as the Tambov Repair and Bearing Plant. During the operation of the building as a shop the bell towers were destroyed, the facade was disfigured, the basement was flooded, and the walls corroded by acid.

It was not until 1996 that the reconstruction of the church began, on the funds raised in Poland. In 1998, the Mayor of Tambov, A. Ilyin, lit the Eternal Light in the church. By 1999, the restoration of the church under the direction of the rector of the parish Josef Matis was complete. At Christmas 1998, daily worship services resumed in the Church of the Exaltation. In the grounds of the church there is a sculpture of Zurab Tsereteli "St. Nicholas the Wonderworker".

In 2024, the church was included in the catalog "Gothic in Russia", a selection of the top 20 churches in Russia.

== See also ==
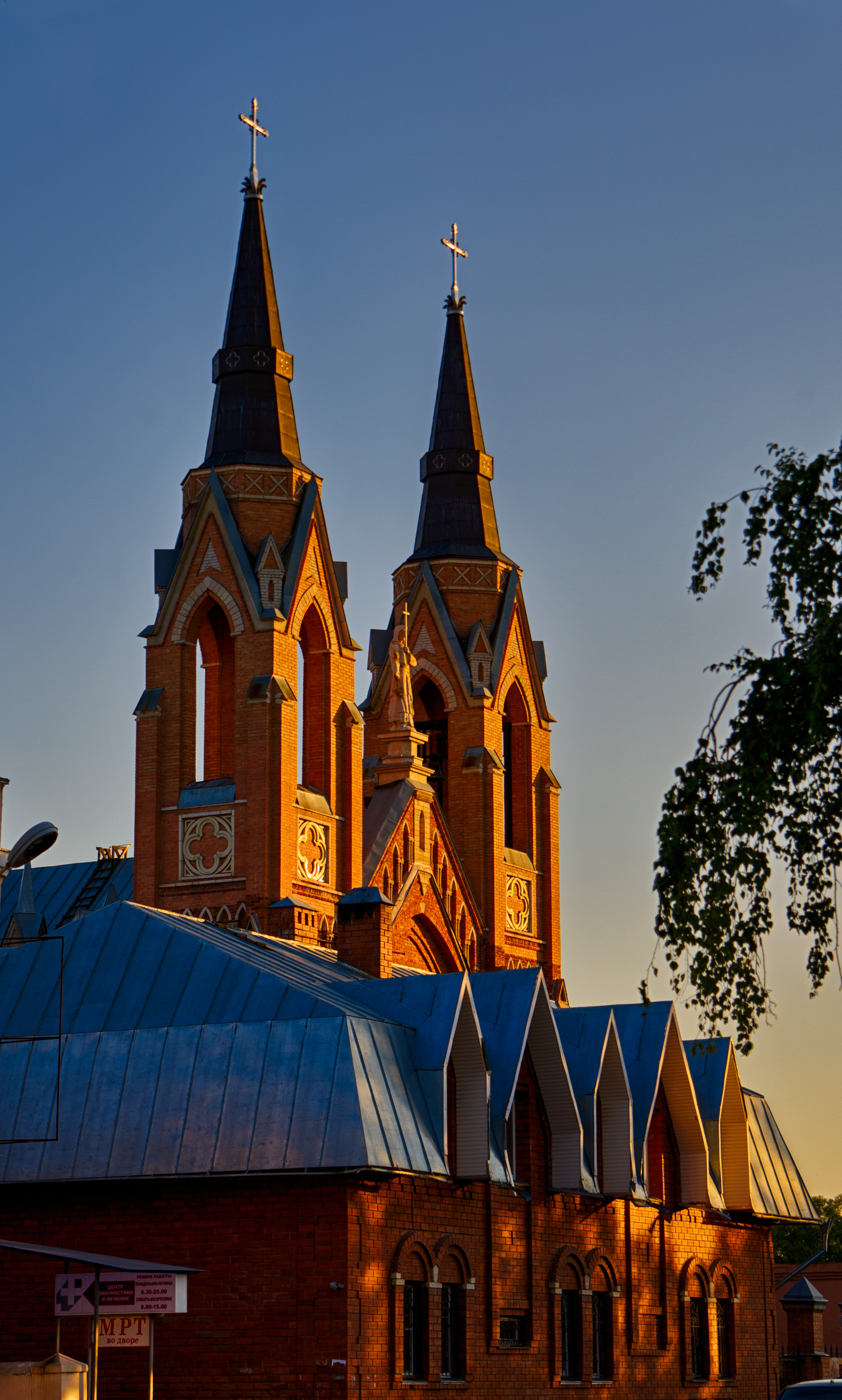
Another View

- Roman Catholicism in Russia
- Exaltation of the Holy Cross
