= Sacred Heart Church, Saint Petersburg =

Coordinates: 59.8806°N 30.4364°E

Sacred Heart Church
- Храм Святейшего Сердца Иисусова
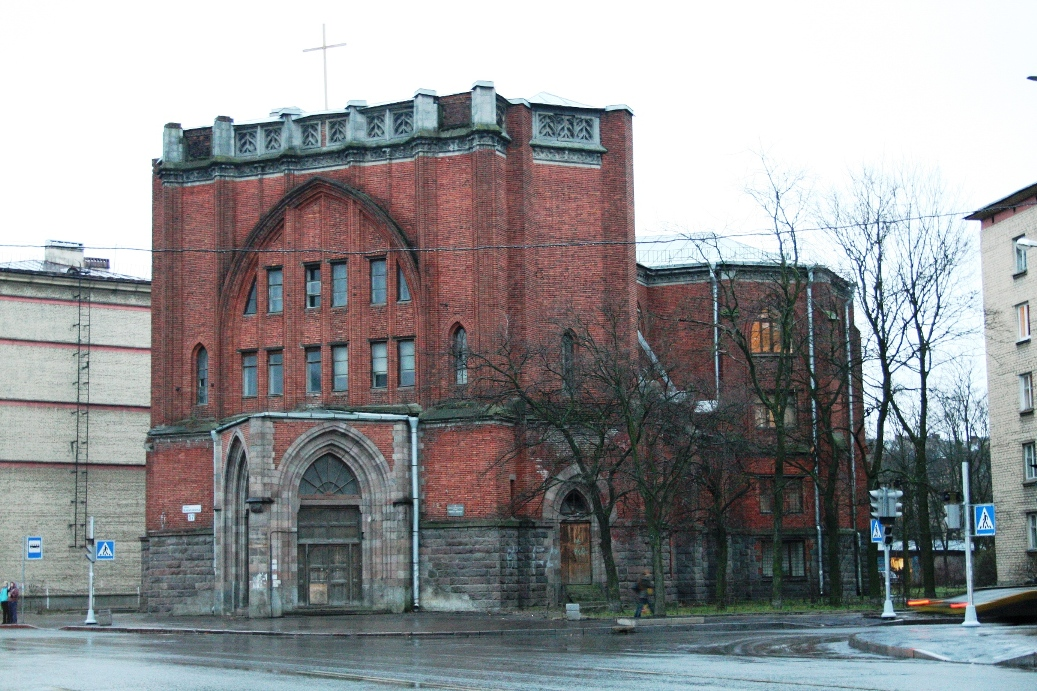
- Sacred Heart Church
- Location: Saint Petersburg
- Country: Russia
- Denomination: Roman Catholic Church

Architecture
- Architect: Stefan Gałęzowski

The Sacred Heart Church (Russian: Храм Святейшего Сердца Иисусова) is a Catholic church, built in the neo-Gothic style located in the Russian city of Saint Petersburg in northern Russia and part of the Roman Catholic Archdiocese of Moscow. It is dedicated to the Sacred Heart of Jesus and is located at 57 Babushkin street.

In 1892 several thousand Catholics, the workers of the Neva district east of the capital and of Polish origin, most sought permission to build a new church that was finally obtained in autumn 1905. It was then officially dedicated to the Sacred Heart of Jesus. Before the structure was finished the parishioners met in a near Obukhov factory, under the auspices of the parish of St. Catherine. The necessary land was purchased 18 November 1906 and plans for construction were entrusted to the architect Stefan Gałęzowski and the first stone was blessed on 8 September 1907, but due to financial difficulties, the main work was completed only in 1912 and worship began in 1914. The church was consecrated in 1917 after the February revolution. A tower could not be built. In 1918, a parish was established at the church, and Teofilius Matulionis became its parish priest. In 1937, the church was closed and its interior was remodeled.

After the fall of the USSR and the end of an atheistic government, the Catholic Church in Russia, like other Christians were again allowed to operate relatively normally. A parish was formed in 1993, which was assigned a part of the building. The first Mass was celebrated on 6 June 1996. The parish obtained the right to recover the entire building in 2003, but the right to build a tower as it was in the original plans was denied by the municipality in 2009.

Restoration work began in 2011.

== See also ==
- Catholic Church in Russia
- Sacred Heart Church

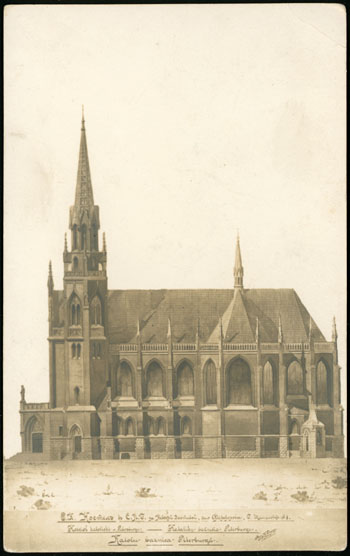
original design of the church
