= Catholic Church in Russia =

- Католическая церковь в России
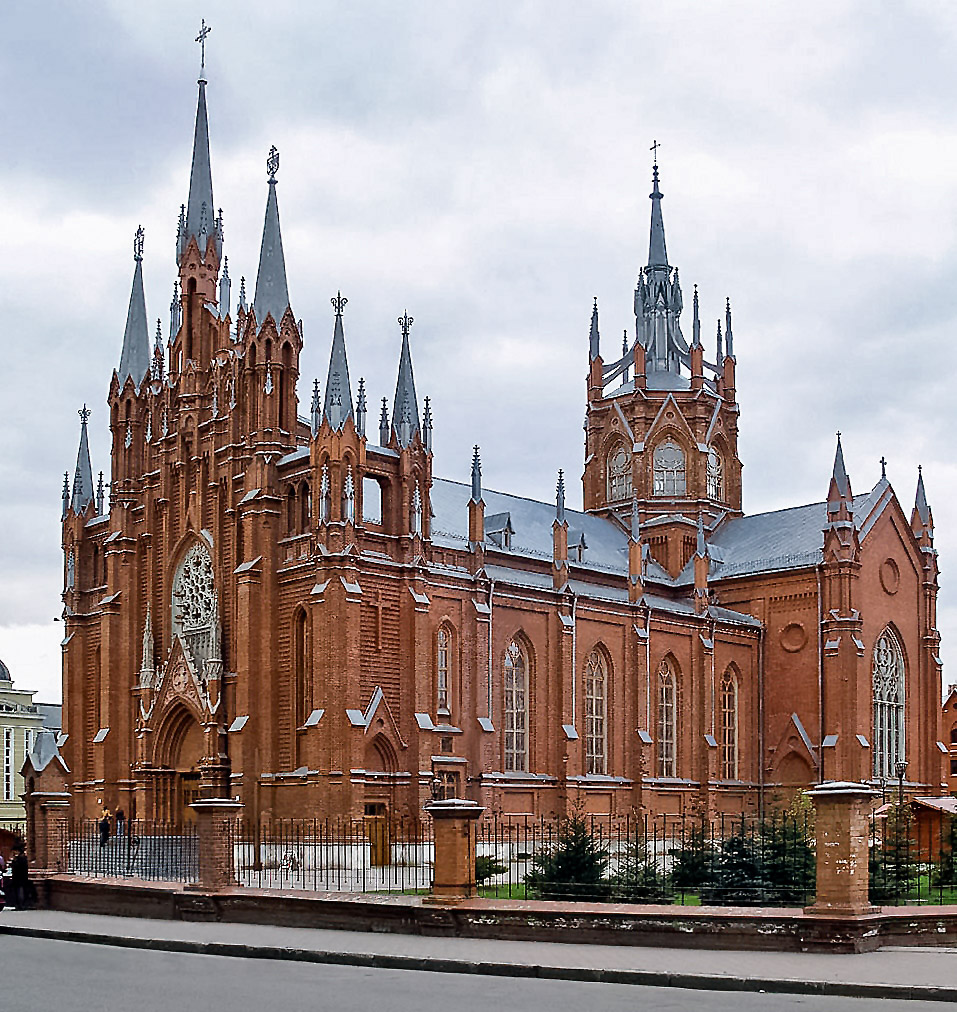
- Cathedral of the Immaculate Conception
- Type: National polity
- Classification: Catholic
- Orientation: Slavic Christianity, Latin
- Scripture: Bible
- Theology: Catholic theology
- Governance: Conference of Catholic Bishops of Russia
- Pope: Leo XIV
- Chairman: Clemens Pickel
- Apostolic Nuncio: Giovanni d'Aniello
- Region: Russia
- Language: Ecclesiastical Latin, Church Slavonic, Russian
- Headquarters: Moscow, Russia
- Origin: 11th century
- Separations: Russian Orthodox Church
- Official website: catholic-russia.ru

Ethnic affiliation of Russia's Catholics (2012)
1. Russians (47.1%)
2. Germans (15.9%)
3. Armenians (9.40%)
4. Belarusians (4.90%)
5. Ukrainians (4.80%)
6. Koreans (2.70%)
7. Kabardians (1.90%)
8. Bashkirs (1.80%)
9. Other (mainly Poles, Lithuanians, and Latvians) (11.5%)

The Catholic Church in Russia is part of the worldwide Catholic Church, under the spiritual leadership of the Pope in Rome. The ecclesiastical province of the Latin Church in Russia consists of the Archdiocese of the Mother of God in Moscow and its three suffragan dioceses: the Diocese of St. Clement in Saratov, the Diocese of St. Joseph in Irkutsk, and the Diocese of the Transfiguration in Novosibirsk. As of 2025, there were 396 parishes in Russia served by six bishops, 304 priests, and 338 nuns.

According to the 2016 Annuario Pontificio, there are approximately 773,000 Catholics in Russia, which is 0.5% of the total Russian population. However, a 2012 survey determined that there are approximately 240,000 Catholics in Russia (0.2% of the total Russian population), accounting for 7.2% of Germans, 1.8% of Armenians, 1.3% of Belarusians, and just under 1% of Bashkirs. The survey also found 45% of Catholics praying every day versus 17% of Eastern Orthodox. The Catholic Church in Russia has a shortage of Russian priests, with most priests being from other countries. Many parishes receive priests only once a month.

== History ==
=== Origins ===
Since Rus' (the Eastern Slavic polity that later came to be Russia, Belarus and Ukraine) was converted in 988, before the Great Schism of 1054, it is somewhat anachronistic to talk of the Catholic versus the Eastern Orthodox Church in the origins of Russian Christianity. However, the Great Schism of 1054 was actually the culmination of a long process and the churches had been in schism before that (e.g., the Photian schism of the 9th century) and had been growing apart for centuries before that.

Western sources indicate that Princess Olga sent an embassy to the Holy Roman Emperor Otto I. Otto charged Bishop Adaldag of Bremen with missionary work to the Rus'; Adaldag consecrated the monk Libutius of the Convent of St. Albano as bishop of Russia, but Libutius died before he ever set foot in Russia. He was succeeded by Adalbertus, a monk of the convent of St. Maximinus at Trier, but Adalbertus returned to Germany after several of his companions were killed in Russia.

Western sources also indicate that Olga's grandson, Prince Vladimir sent emissaries to Rome in 991 and that Popes John XV and Sylvester II sent three embassies to Kyiv. A German chronicler, Dithmar, relates that the Archbishop of Magdeburg consecrated a Saxon as archbishop of Russia and that the latter arrived in Russia, where he preached the Gospel and was killed there with 18 of his companions on February 14, 1002. At this same time, Bishop Reinbert of Kolberg accompanied the daughter of Boleslaus the Intrepid to her wedding when she married Vladimir's son Sviatopolk, (known to history as "the Damned" for his later murder of his half-brothers Boris and Gleb). Reinbert was arrested for his efforts to proselytize and died in prison. Bruno of Querfort was sent as a missionary bishop to the Pechenegs and spent several months in Kyiv in 1008; he wrote a letter to the Holy Roman Emperor Henry II in 1009.

These embassies to and from Rus' may be the basis for the somewhat fanciful account in the Russian Primary Chronicle of Prince Vladimir sending out emissaries to the various religions around Rus' (Islam, Judaism, Western and Eastern Christianity), including to the Catholic Church in Germany, although the emissaries returned unimpressed by Western Christianity, explaining in part the eventual adoption of Orthodox Christianity.

=== Catholicism in Rus' from the 11th century to the Council of Florence ===
The Russian Orthodox Church has had a long conflict with Catholicism. Metropolitan Ivan II (died 1089) responded to a proposal of Antipope Clement III for a union of the churches with a letter outlining the theological differences with Catholicism (Markovich attributes this letter to Metropolitan Ivan IV who died in 1166.) Metropolitan Nicephorus I (1103–1121) also considered Catholicism heretical; this has been the standard view in the Russian church and not just among the heads of the church, who were often Greeks sent from Constantinople. Thus, Archbishop Nifont of Novgorod (1135–1156) in the instructional "Questions of Kirik", responded that a woman who took her children to be baptised by a Catholic (the term "Varangian", that is, Viking, is used) priest was to incur the same penance as one who took them to be blessed by a pagan sorcerer. Other sources, including the Kormchaia Kniga (the code of canon law of the medieval Russian Church) attacked Catholicism as a heresy to be shunned. Until the time of Metropolitan Isidor (1431–1437), a Greek sent from Constantinople to preside over the Church in Rus, the metropolitans of Kyiv had almost no contact with Rome.

This did not mean that there was no Catholic presence in Rus'. The Teutonic Knights and the Brothers of the Sword (absorbed into the Teutonic Order in 1227), Swedes, Danes, and other Catholic powers launched a series of crusades against Pskov, Novgorod, and other towns in northwestern Russia and the Novgorodians fought hard to keep westerners out of the Novgorodian Land, not merely due to religious differences, but also because they would pay taxes to the Catholic monarchies' administrative structures. Taxes, tribute, or military levies would then go to the Scandinavian kingdoms or the Germanic city-states of Livonia, or to the Lithuanians, and thus reduce Novgorod's wealth and overall security. In the 1330s and 1340s, King Magnus Eriksson of Norway and Sweden launched a crusade against the Novgorodian land, preaching crusade and mustering armies in Livonia and Germany as well as in Sweden and Norway. In 1387, the Lithuanians, who had long threatened the western frontier, became Catholic and united dynastically with the Poles. The Catholic Grand Princes, such as Vytautas the Great, attempted to establish separate metropolitanates in the Russian lands they controlled. The Russian church always fought against this, in large part out of fear that the new metropolitanates would be converted to Catholic provinces.

The popes attempted more peaceful means of conversion as well. Pope Innocent IV sent two cardinals to Prince Aleksandr Nevsky in 1248, who famously rejected their appeal that he become Catholic. In 1255 Innocent met with success, dispatching a crown to Prince Daniil of Galich (Halych), in what is today Western Ukraine, the acceptance of which is taken to mean that Daniil accepted Catholicism. There were reports of Irish monks fleeing the Mongol onslaught on Kyiv in 1240, and the Dominican Order was also dispatched by Pope Alexander IV to central Russia in an effort to convert the region to Catholicism in the 14th century. The princes of Rus also married into Catholic dynasties: Prince Yaroslav Vladimirovich (Yaroslav the Wise) and other princes married their daughters to Western princes; one of these dynastic marriages was, in fact, to a Holy Roman Emperor (although the marriage was an unhappy and ultimately failed one). Prince Iziaslav Yaroslavich (1054–68; 1069–73; 1076–78) sent his son to Pope Gregory VII, asking for papal assistance and promising to make Russia a vassal of the Holy See. Gregory's reply letter is dated April 17, 1075. Grand Prince Vsevolod Yaroslavich (1078–93) established the feast of the translation of the relics of St. Nicholas to Bari in Southern Italy, a feast approved by Pope Urban II (1088–99), who in 1091 sent Bishop Teodoro to Vsevolod with relics.

One line of descent from the Russian royal family in a Catholic dynasty produced several saints from the House of Arpad in Hungary, most notably St. Elizabeth of Hungary, who was a direct descendant of Vladimir the Great (through her father's side).

=== Council of Florence to 19th century ===
The first Catholic diocese established in Russia was the Roman Catholic Diocese of Smolensk in 1636. Smolensk covered all of Russia until the Roman Catholic Diocese of Mohilev was established by Catherine the Great in 1772 without Papal authority, but it was approved by Pope Pius VI in 1783. In 1798 the Archdiocese of Mohilev was raised to Metropolitan Archdiocese of Mohilev with five (six after 1848) suffragan dioceses.

Pope Gregory XVI spoke of his concerns regarding the forcible conversion of Russian Catholics in an allocution in Rome on 22 July 1842. Initial attempts to resolve his concerns privately with the Tsar led to criticisms of the Pope, who was seen as inadequately supportive of Russian Catholics, and he therefore resolved to put forward a more public protest.

When the Jesuit order was suppressed in the second half of the 18th century, the papal brief promulgating the suppression was not promulgated in Russia. Catherine the Great valued the contribution of the Jesuits to learning, and invited them to Russia, where they remained active until they were expelled in 1820 at the instigation of Russian Orthodox hierarchs.

=== 20th century ===
Before 1917, there were two dioceses in the current territory of Russia (not to be confused with the bigger territory of the Russian Empire): in Mogilev with its episcopal see in St. Petersburg and Tiraspol with its episcopal see in Saratov. 150 Catholic parishes were present with more than 250 priests to serve around half a million Catholic believers in Russia.

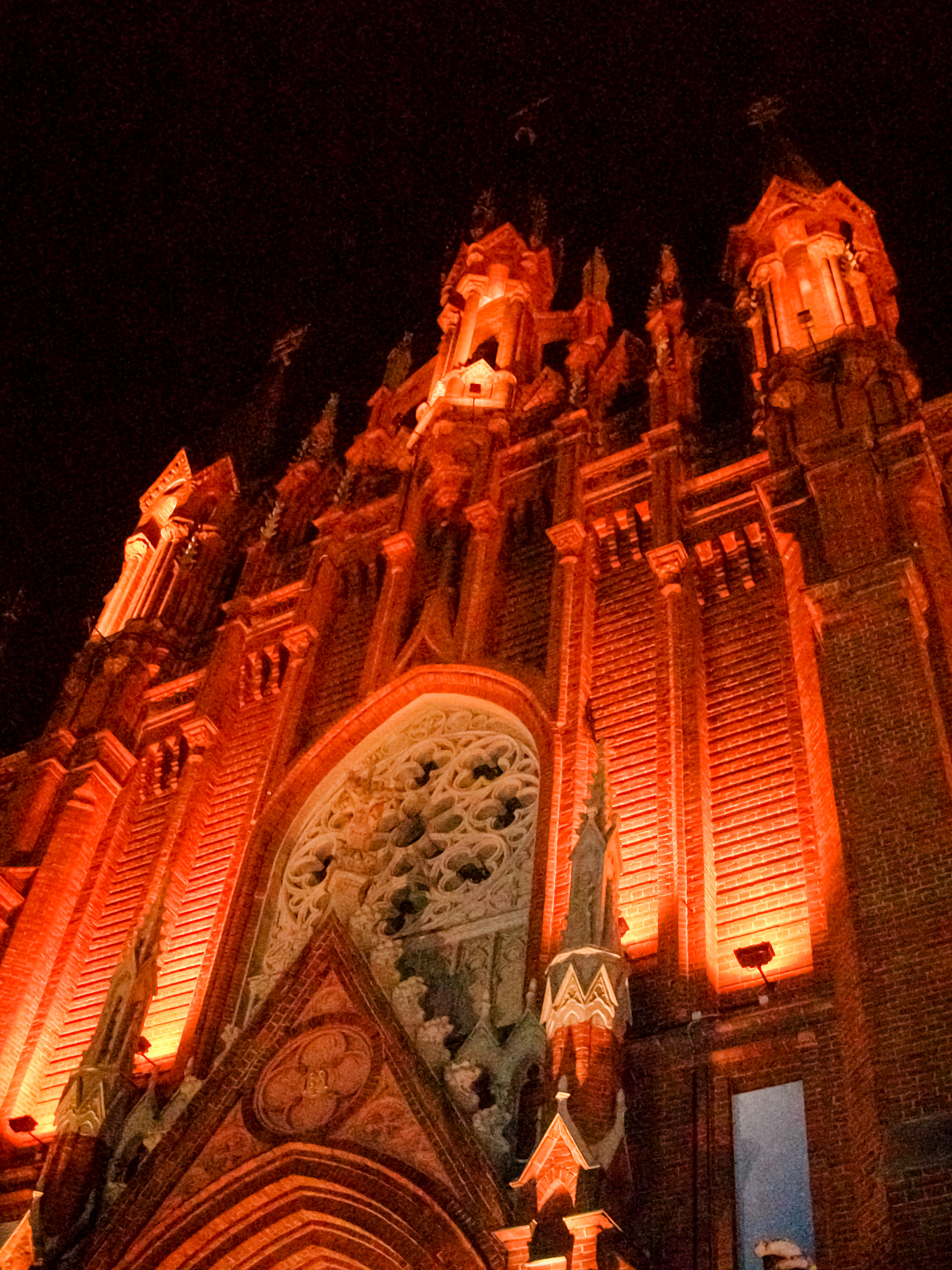
Entrance to the Cathedral of the Immaculate Conception of the Holy Virgin Mary, opened in 1911, closed by the Communist authorities in 1937 and reopened in 1999

During the 69 years of the Soviet time (1922–1991) many Catholic faithful lost their lives, were persecuted, or imprisoned for their faith. Besides being Christian, the Catholics had an additional stigma by belonging to a church that, unlike the Eastern Orthodox Christians, has not been considered indigenously Russian. By the end of the 1930s, there were only two functioning Catholic churches in the USSR, staffed by and catering largely to French expatriates: the Church of St. Louis in Moscow and the Church of Our Lady of Lourdes in St. Petersburg.

In the aftermath of the post-Civil-War famine of 1921, the Catholic Church sent a Papal Famine Relief Mission to Russia, headed by the American Jesuit Edmund A. Walsh. The mission also succeeded in securing for the Vatican the Holy Relics of St. Andrew Bobola, which were then transported to Rome by the Mission's Assistant Director, Louis J. Gallagher.

=== 21st century ===
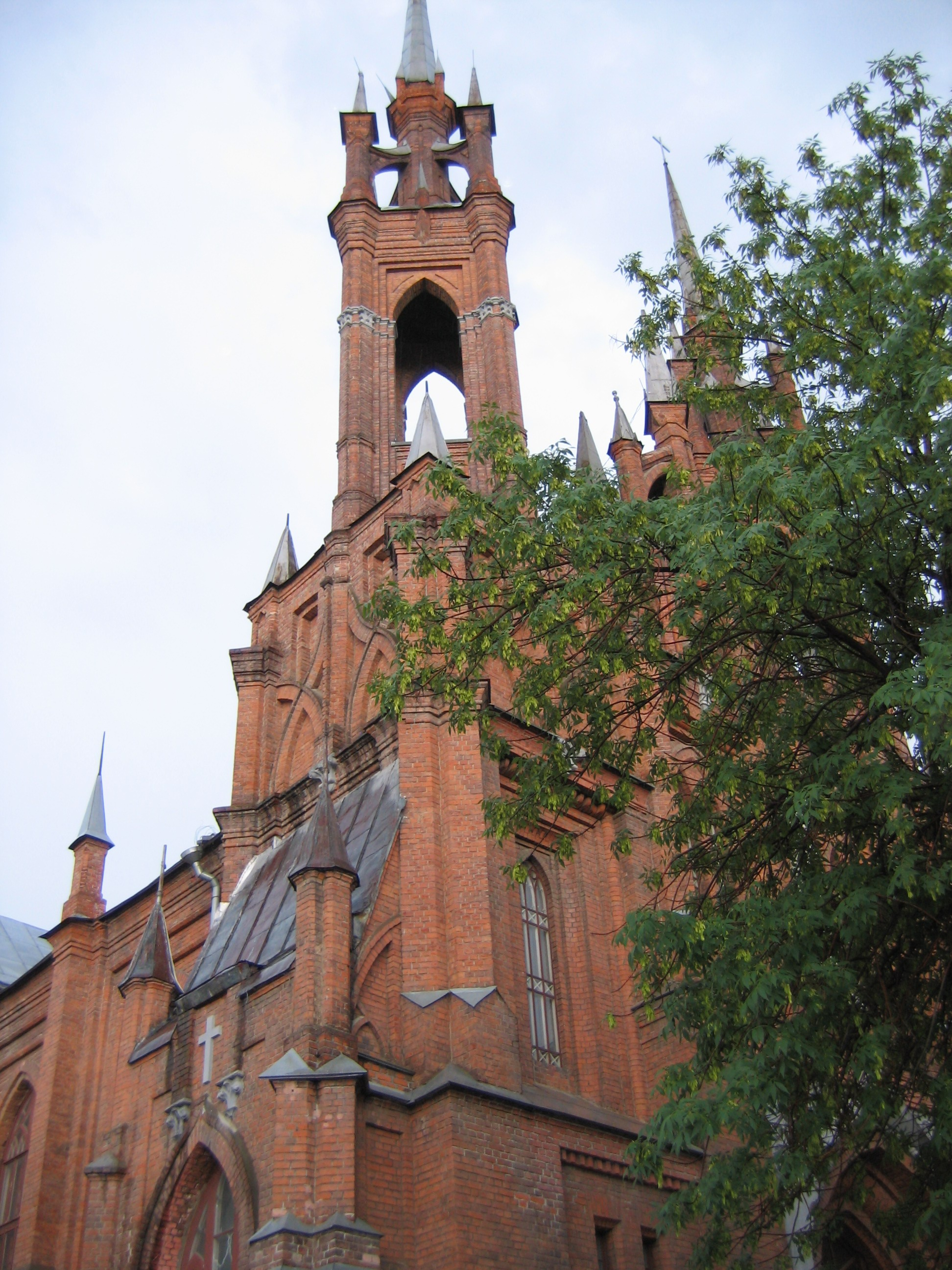
Catholic Church in Samara

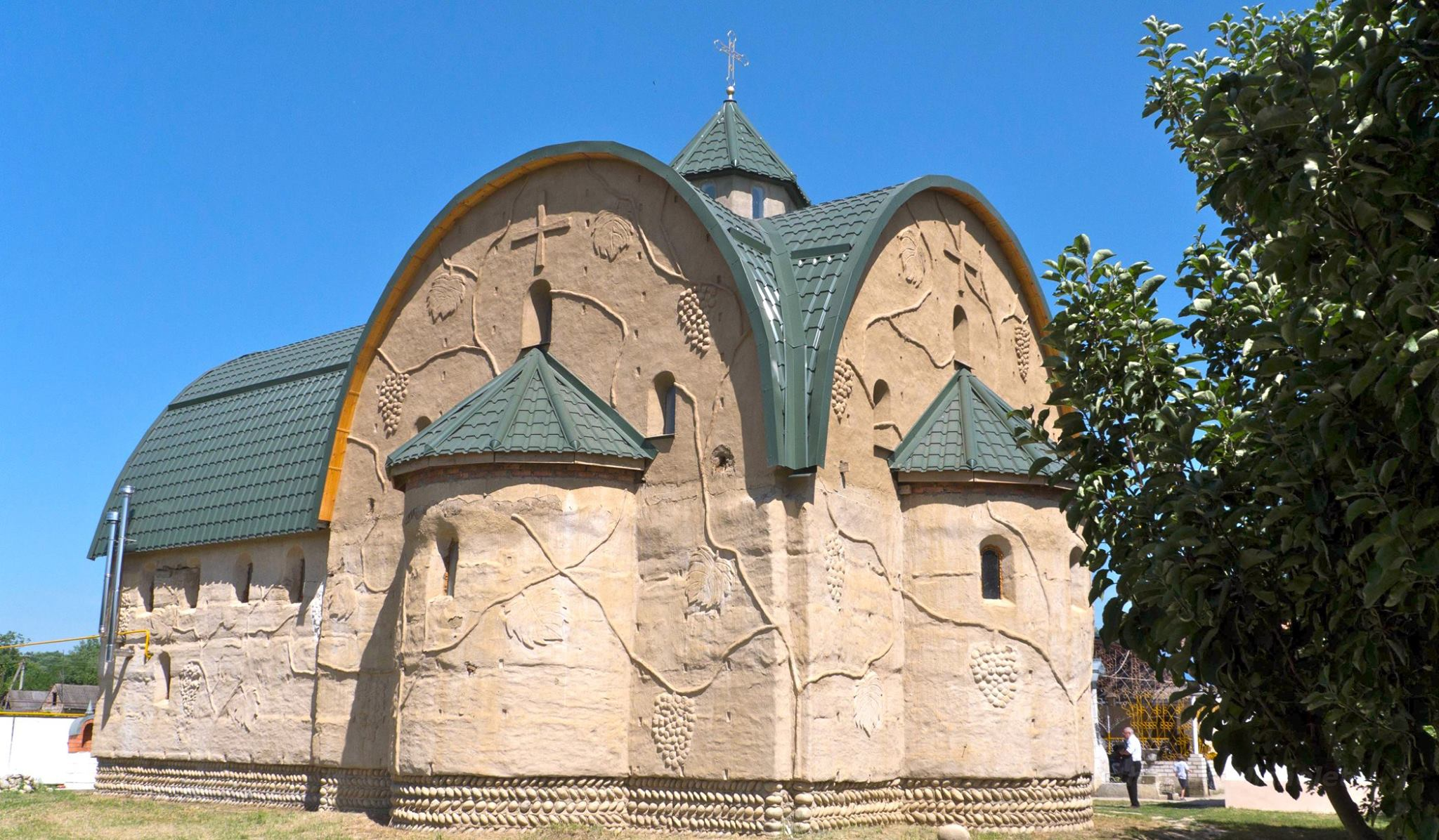
Catholic church in Kabardino-Balkaria (Diocese of Saratov, Blagoveshchenka)

As of 2017, there were approximately 140,000 Catholics in Russia - about 0.1% of the total population. After the Soviet Union collapsed, there were an estimated 500,000 Catholics in the country, but most have since died or emigrated to their ethnic homelands in Europe, such as Germany, Belarus, or Ukraine. The members of European Catholic ethnic groups are mostly elderly and rapidly decreasing (see here), although they do still account for most of the senior clergy. At the same time, the numbers of ethnic Russian Catholics account for more of the younger faithful, especially as the children of mixed marriages between European Catholics and Russians are registered as ethnic Russians. There also has been a slight boost in Catholics via immigration of Armenians, some of whom are Catholic, and a few of Russia's ethnic minority communities (such as the Circassians) also have small Catholic populations.

Relations with the Russian Orthodox church have been rocky for nearly a millennium, and attempts at re-establishing Catholicism have met with opposition. Pope John Paul II for years expressed a desire to visit Russia, but the Russian Orthodox Church resisted. In April 2002, the Catholic Bishop Jerzy Mazur of the Diocese of Saint Joseph at Irkutsk in Eastern Siberia was stripped of his visa, forcing the appointment of a new bishop for that diocese. As of 2026, he is the bishop of the Diocese of Elk in the Catholic Church in Poland. In 2002, five foreign Catholic priests were denied visas to return to Russia, construction of a new cathedral was blocked in Pskov, and a church in southern Russia was shot at. On Gregorian Christmas Day 2005, Russian Orthodox activists planned to picket outside of Moscow's Catholic Cathedral, but the picket was cancelled. Despite the thawing of relations with the election of Pope Benedict XVI in 2005, there are still issues such as the readiness of the police to protect Catholics and other minorities from persecution.

One thousand Russian Catholics gathered in the Virgin Mary's Immaculate Conception Cathedral in Moscow to watch the funeral of Pope John Paul II.

A 2004 ecumenical conference was organized for Russia's "traditional religions", Orthodox Christianity, Judaism, Islam and Buddhism, and therefore excluded Catholicism.

== Latin Church dioceses ==
The ecclesiastical province of Moscow consists of the archdiocese of Moscow with three suffragan dioceses in Saratov, Irkutsk and Novosibirsk. These four dioceses comprise the whole of Russia except for the Sakhalin Oblast, which forms the Apostolic Prefecture of Yuzhno Sakhalinsk.

- Archdiocese of Moscow
  - Diocese of Saratov
  - Diocese of Irkutsk
  - Diocese of Novosibirsk
- Apostolic Prefecture of Yuzhno Sakhalinsk

These dioceses and this apostolic prefecture all belong to the Latin Church. There is a separate jurisdiction for those of the Byzantine Rite (see Russian Greek Catholic Church), called the Apostolic Exarchate of Russia, but it has few followers. There has been no exarch since 1951, but in 2004 Latin Bishop Joseph Werth was appointed Ordinary for Byzantine Catholics in Russia.

The then Apostolic Administrations were formed into the current archdiocese in Moscow and the three dioceses in February 2002.

=== Crimea ===
Even though the Crimea was annexed by the Russian Federation in March 2014, this is not recognised by the Catholic hierarchy. The Latin Church in the Crimea therefore remains part of the Diocese of Odesa-Simferopol which is a suffragan of the archdiocese of Lviv. However, apostolic district of Crimea and Sevastopol was created to serve Catholics on the peninsula, with bishop Jacek Pyl, auxiliary bishop of Odesa-Simferopol, who has lived in Simferopol since his episcopal consecration as a delegate there.

The Greek Catholics belong to the Ukrainian Catholic Archiepiscopal Exarchate of Crimea, which is a suffragan of the archeparchy of Kyiv.

== Eastern Catholic churches ==
A small number of parishes belonging to Eastern Catholic Churches operate in Russia. These combine unity with the Roman Catholic Church with the preservation of ancient Eastern liturgical rites. They include the Russian Greek Catholic Church and the Armenian Catholic Church. There are adherents of the Ukrainian Greek Catholic Church within the Ukrainian diaspora. A single congregation of the Belarusian Greek Catholic Church exists in Kaliningrad.

=== Russian Byzantine Catholic Church ===
Aside from the Latin Church, there is also the sui iuris Russian Byzantine Catholic Church (for Russian Catholics of the Byzantine Rite), which follows Russian ecclesiastical traditions and uses the Russian language, established in 1905. Leonid Feodorov was appointed exarch of the church by the Holy See, which was of the opinion that the Byzantine rite would be a better fit for the Russian people than the Roman.

=== Ordinariate for Catholics of Armenian Rite in Eastern Europe ===
In 2010, there were 59,000 members of the Armenian Catholic Church in Russia and they were of the pastoral care of the Ordinariate for Catholics of Armenian Rite in Eastern Europe; the government refused for the most part to allow them to register their parishes.

== See also ==
- Michel d'Herbigny
- Church of the Intercession of the Virgin Mary, Tomsk
- Church of the Assumption of Mary (Astrakhan)
- Sacred Heart Church, St. Petersburg
