= Church of the Dormition of Mary, Mariupol =

Destroyed Eastern Orthodox church in Mariupol, Ukraine

Church of the Dormition of Mary
- Church of the Dormition of the Holy Virgin Mary
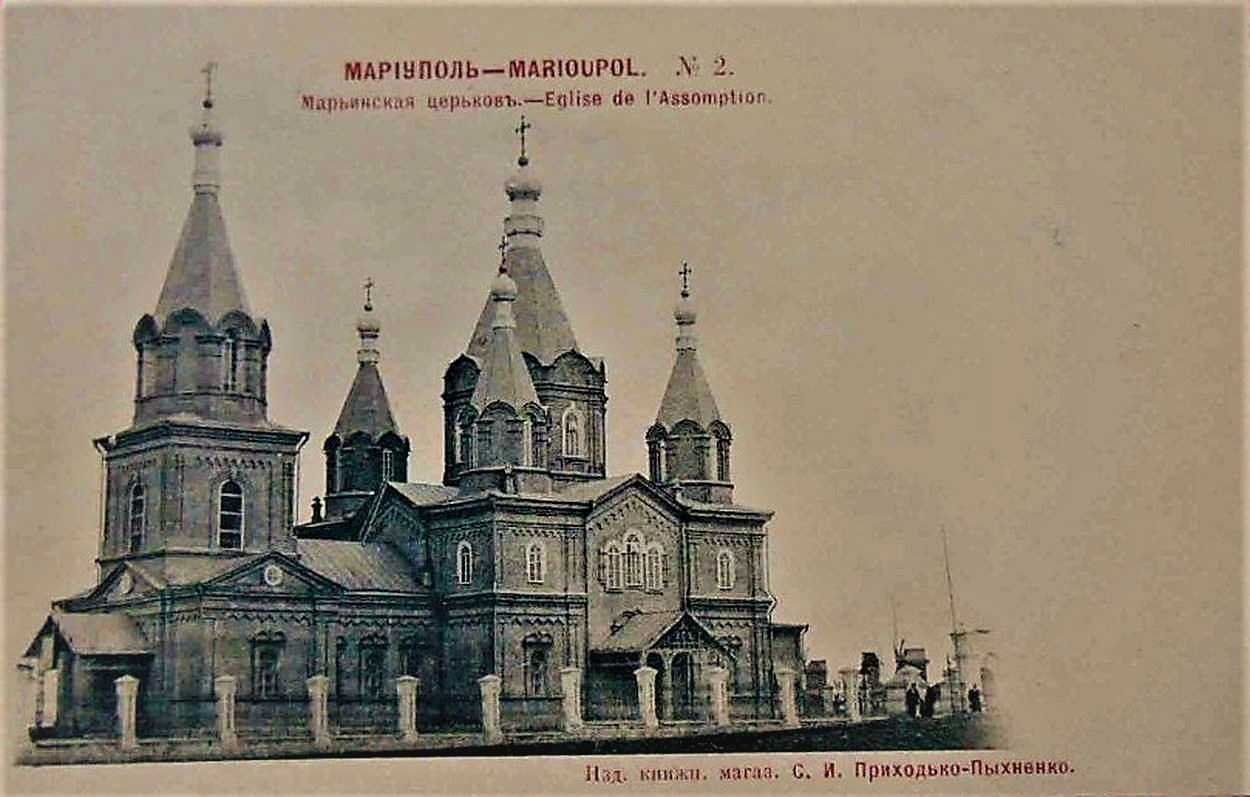
- Photo from 1900

- Location within Ukraine
- 47°06′34″N 37°33′43.8″E
- Location: Mariupol
- Country: Ukraine

History
- Status: Church
- Founded: 1780
- Dedication: Assumption of Mary

Architecture
- Functional status: destroyed
- Years built: 1880
- Completed: 1887

Specifications
- Materials: Brick

The Church of the Dormition of Mary (Ukrainian: Успенська церква, Церква Успіння Пресвятої Богородиці) was an Orthodox church in Mariupol, Ukraine.

== History ==
It was an Orthodox church dedicated to the Dormition of the Mother of God. The architect Victor Nilsen designed and built this church between 1880 and 1887. The building stood until it was demolished in 1934 during the Soviet era by the Bolshevik government as part of the Atheist Five-Year Plan.

In the church there was the icon of Mary Odigitria also known as Mother of God of Mariupol. It was considered a miraculous icon.

== Gallery ==
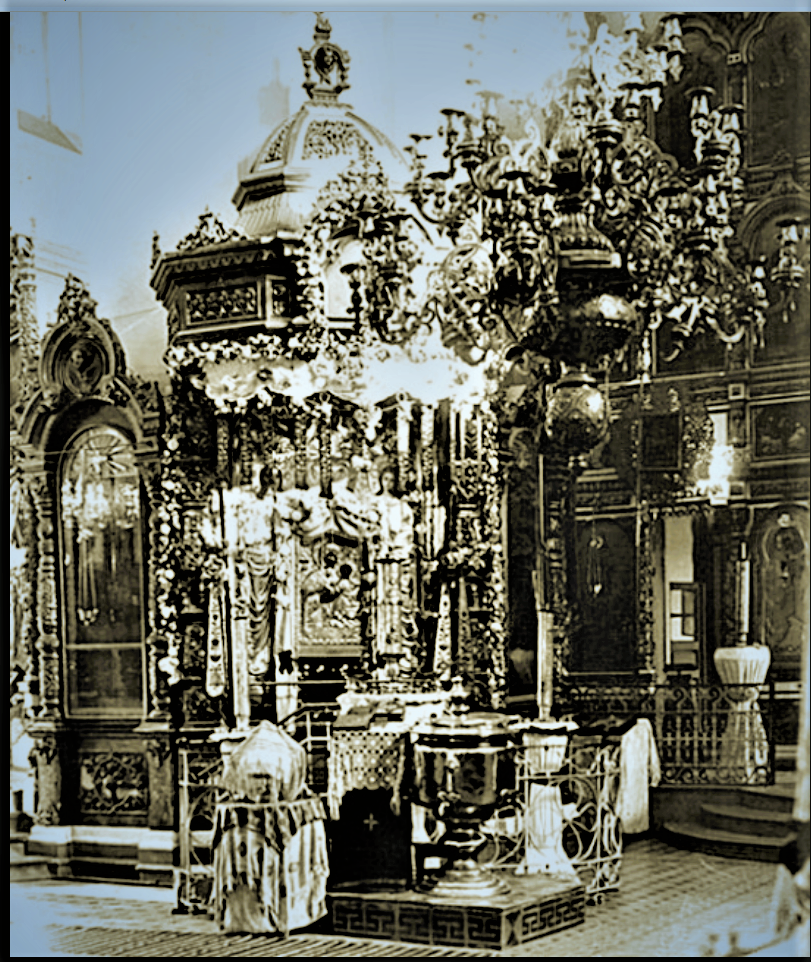
In the church there was the icon of Mary Odigitria also known as Mother of God of Mariupol.

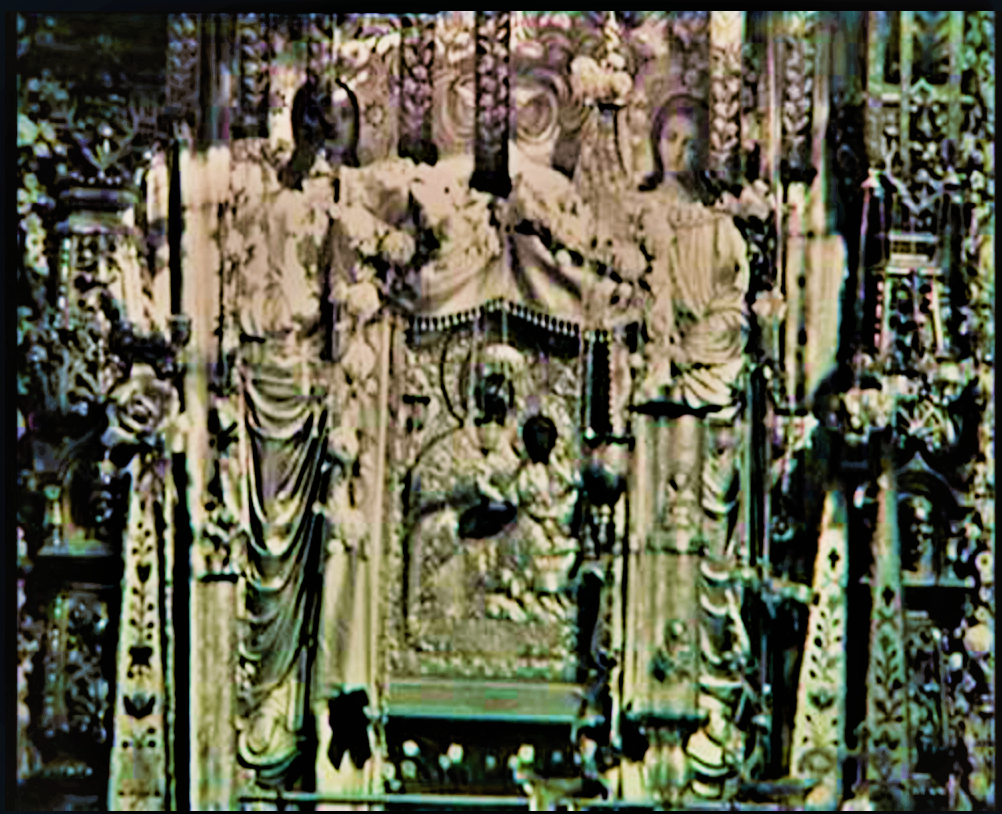
The icon of Mary Odigitria was considered a miraculous icon.

== See also ==
- Roman Catholic Church of the Assumption of Mary, Mariupol
