= Wincenty Lipski =

Wincenty Lipski (born March 17, 1795, in Łozowica; died December 13, 1875, in Saratov) was a Polish Roman Catholic priest, auxiliary bishop of the Russian Roman Catholic Diocese of Tiraspol from 1857 to 1875, and apostolic administrator of that diocese from 1864 to 1872.

Lipski was born in 1795 in Łozowica, near Klimowicz, Belarus. He undertook theological studies in Vilnius and was ordained a priest on May 31, 1821. In 1824, he became scholaster and archdeacon of the Catholic cathedral in Vilnius. In 1855, he was named rector of the Saint Petersburg Roman Catholic Theological Academy.

On September 18, 1856, he was named auxiliary bishop of the Diocese of Tiraspol and titular bishop of Jonopolis by Pope Pius IX. He was consecrated on January 9, 1857, in St. Petersburg. In the years 1864–1872 he was the apostolic administrator of the diocese. He created many parishes and built many chapels. He founded a minor theological seminary in Saratov and provided Poles with pastoral care.

Lipski died in 1875 and his tomb is located in the Assumption of the Blessed Virgin Mary Cathedral, Odessa.

== Bibliography ==
Nitecki, Piotr (2000). Biskupi Kościoła w Polsce w latach 965-1999. Warszawa: Instytut Wydawniczy Pax. ISBN 9788321113111.
