= Diocese of Tiraspol (Russia) =

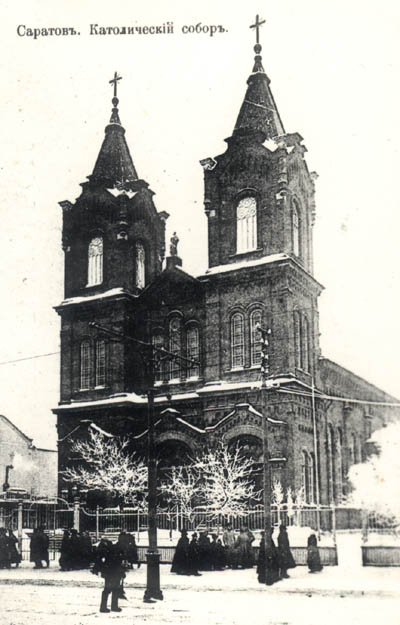
Cathedral of St. Clement in Saratov (1917)

The Diocese of Tiraspol was a Latin Church diocese of the Catholic Church on Czarist/Soviet-controlled territory in and around what is now the republic of Moldova but also in the current territory of Russia and Ukraine. On 11 February 2002, it was suppressed, its territory being merged into the Russian Diocese of Saint Clement at Saratov.

== History ==
In the fourteenth century the town of Tiraspol had served as the cathedral see of the Diocese of Kherson, now a titular see.

The Diocese of Tiraspol (Dioecesis Tiraspolitanus) was established on 3 July 1848 on Czarist territory, split off as a suffragan see of the Metropolitan Archdiocese of Mohilev. The Catholic population was largely German in ethnic origin, although there were also significant Polish and Armenian Catholic communities. During the second half of the eighteenth century large numbers of German colonists went to Russia at the request of the Empress Catherine II. These emigrants were chiefly from Bavaria, Wurtemberg, Saxony, Alsace-Lorraine, the Tyrol, and Switzerland.

The see city of the diocese was Saratov rather than Tiraspol; the choice of Tiraspol for the name of the diocese may have been because the city had been the cathedral city of the fourteenth century diocese of Kherson.

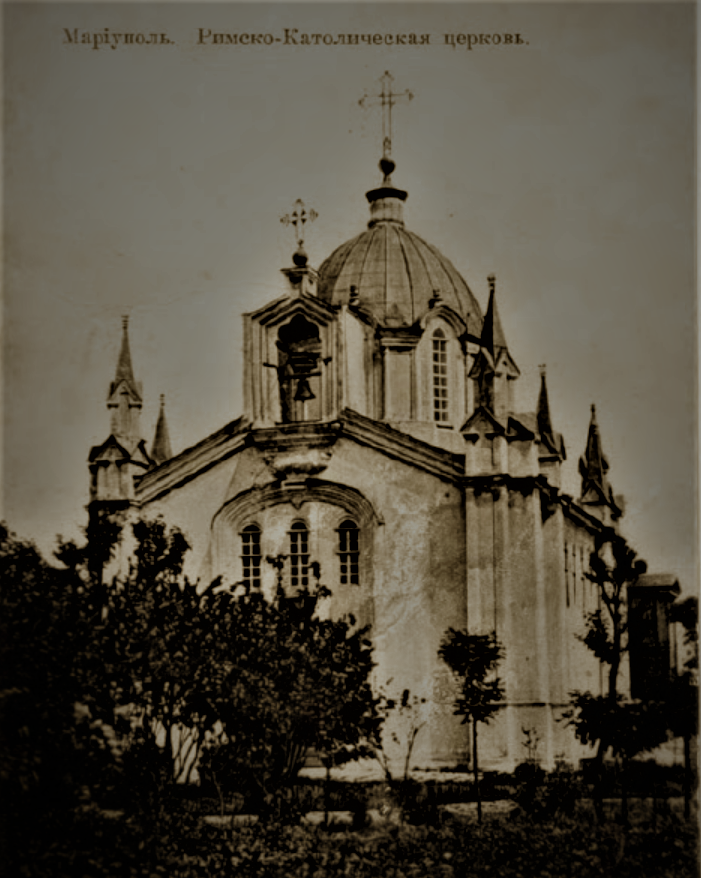
Italian Church of the Assumption

The first Roman Catholic bishop of Tiraspol, appointed in 1850, was Ferdinand Helanus Kahn, OP, a German Dominican. Wincenty Lipski, a Pole, was appointed auxiliary bishop in 1856. During his tenure, the Italian Church of the Assumption in Mariupol, was opened in Mariupol, serving a community of sea captains and merchants. Upon Kahn's death in 1864, he became apostolic administrator until 1872.

Bishop Kessler expanded the seminary, founded a publishing house, supported the work of male and female religious orders, visited all parishes of the giant diocese, and conducted 75,000 confirmations. Under Soviet rule, the diocese, as with the structures of many other churches and religious communities, was the subject of repression. Bishop Kessler went into exile in 1918, and the see of Tiraspol became formally vacant on his death in 1933. Meanwhile, there were attempts to organise the diocese under a series of apostolic administrators, viz.: Johannes Roth, Aleksander Frison, and Augustin Baumtrog, but these attempts ended in increased repression, and in two cases, their execution (Frison in 1937, Roth in 1938). The former St. Klemens Cathedral became a movie theatre.

The diocese lost territory in 1921 to the Romanian Diocese of Iaşi (this territory became, on 28 October 1993, the Apostolic Administration of Moldova, elevated to the diocese of Chisinau in 2001, covering the post-soviet republic of that name).

The diocese remained inactive, but formally in existence, until its formal suppression in 2002, when the new diocese of St Clement in Saratov was erected, incorporating territory within Russia belonging to the former diocese of Tiraspol. Territory of the former diocese now situated in Moldova and Transnistria (including the city of Tiraspol) was assigned to the Apostolic Administration of Moldova, erected in 1993. Territory of the former diocese in southern Ukraine is now part of the Diocese of Odesa-Simferopol.

Southern territories in Caucasus (Georgia, Azerbaijan and Armenia) became on 30 December 1993 part of the Apostolic Administration of the Caucasus with the decree Quo aptius (the last vatican document about the Diocese of Tiraspol).

The Ordinariate for Catholics of Armenian Rite in Eastern Europe was erected in 1991 for the Armenian communities, previously under the Bishops of Tiraspol.

== Bishops ==
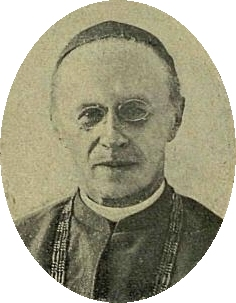
Bishop Edward Ropp, 1906

Roman Rite

- Ferdinand Helanus Kahn, Dominican Order (O.P.) (1850.05.20 – death 1864.10)
  - Auxiliary Bishop Wincenty Lipski (1856.09.18 – 1872)
- Franz Xaver von Zottmann (1872.02.23 – 1889.12)
- Anton Johann Zerr (1889.12.30 – 1902.06.06), previously Titular Bishop of Diocletianopolis & Auxiliary Bishop of Tiraspol (1883.03.15 – 1889.12.30); later Titular Bishop of Salona (1925.11.23 – 1932.12.15)
- Eduard von der Ropp (1902.06.09 – 1903.11.09); later Bishop of Vilnius (Lithuania) (1903.11.09 – 1917.07.25), then staying Apostolic Administrator of Vilnius a while (1917.07.25 – 1918.10.23) when promoted Metropolitan Archbishop of Mohilev (Belarus) (1917.07.25 – 1939.07.25)
- Josef Alois Kessler (1904.04.01 – 1930.01.23), later Titular Archbishop of Bosporus (1930.01.23 – 1933.12.09).
