= Bronislaw Bernacki =

Ukrainian Roman Catholic prelate (1944–2024)

- Bishop Emeritus of Odesa-Simferopol
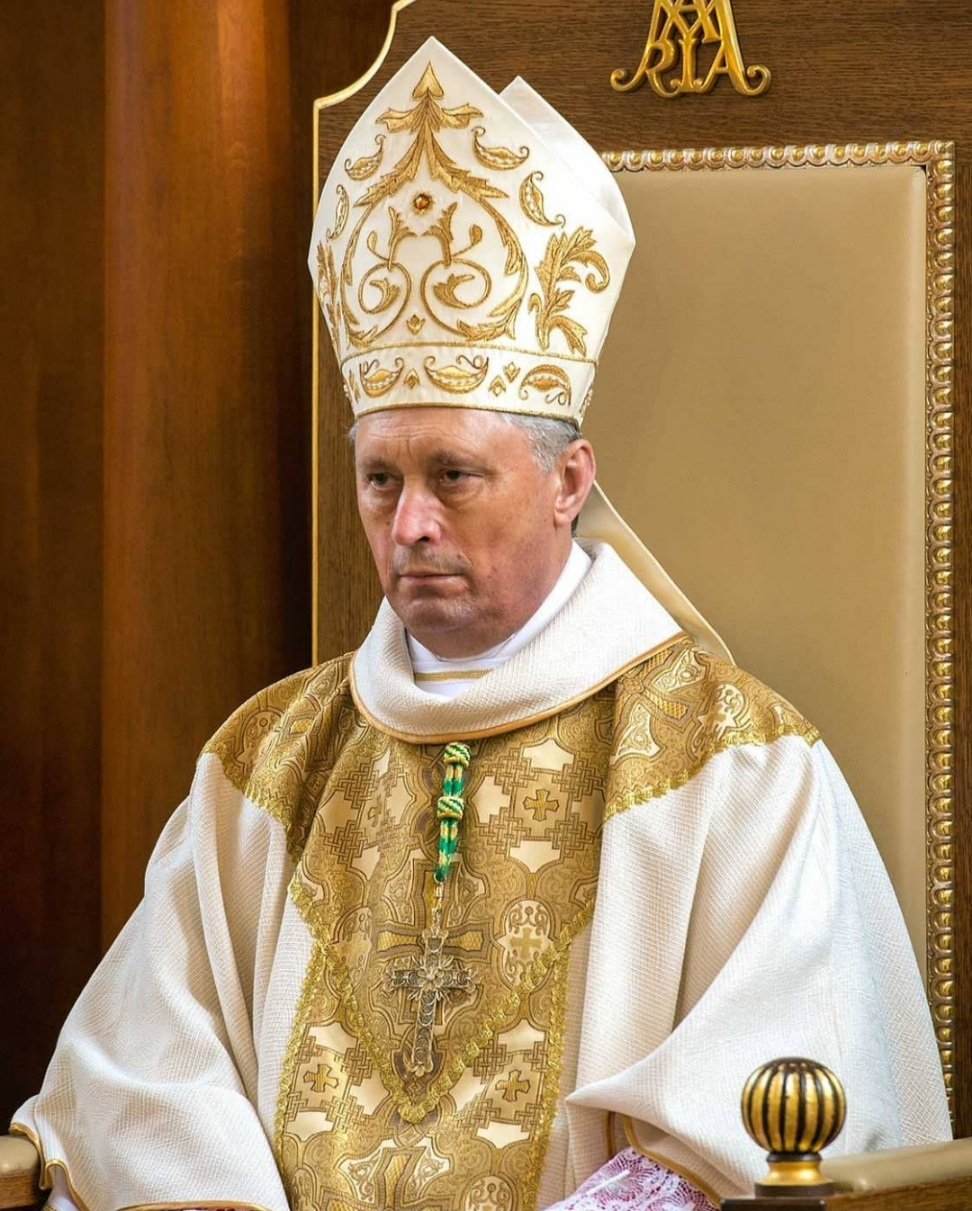
- Bernacki in 2021
- Native name: Броніслав Бернацький
- Appointed: 4 May 2002
- Term ended: 18 February 2020
- Predecessor: new creation
- Successor: Stanislav Shyrokoradiuk
- Other post: President of the Ukrainian Episcopal Conference (2018–2020)

Orders
- Ordination: 28 May 1972 by Julijans Vaivods
- Consecration: 2 July 2002 by Marian Jaworski

Personal details
- Born: 30 September 1944 Murafa, Vinnytsia Oblast, Ukrainian SSR, USSR
- Died: 12 November 2024 (aged 80) Vinnytsia, Ukraine
- Buried: Murafa, Ukraine
- Motto: Per Mariam ad Jesum; (From Mary to Jesus)
- Coat of arms

Bronislaw Bernacki (Ukrainian: Броніслав Бернацький; 30 September 1944 – 12 November 2024) was a Ukrainian Roman Catholic prelate, who served as the first Diocesan Bishop of Odesa-Simferopol from 2002 to 2020.

== Biography ==
Bronislaw Bernacki was born in Murafa, Vinnytsia Oblast in present Ukraine. He studied at the Catholic Seminary of Riga. Bernacki was ordained to the priesthood on 28 May 1972 in Riga. After ordination he served as a parish priest in the town of Bar and neighboring parishes. In 1995 - prior to his native village, and the Vicar General of the Diocese of Kamiamets-Podilskyi. On 4 May 2002 the Holy See announced the creation of Odesa-Simferopol diocese, which included the Crimea, Odesa, Mykolayiv, Kirovohrad and Kherson regions of Ukraine. Bronislaw Bernacki was appointed bishop of the newly formed diocese.

On 4 July 2002 in Kamiamets-Podilskyi, he was elevated to bishop. The construction of the chair was held on 13 July 2002. His episcopal motto chose the words "Through Mary to Jesus". Bishop Bernacki's chair is located in Odesa. Bishop Bernacki took part in the Catholic Bishops' Conference of Ukraine, holding the presidency of the Commission on the Laity, also being the initiator of the establishment and the head of the Spiritual Board of confessional Christian denominations in Odesa and Odesa Region.

Pope Francis accepted his resignation as bishop on 18 February 2020.

Bernacki died at a hospital in Vinnytsia, on 12 November 2024, at the age of 80.
