= Diocese of Odesa-Simferopol =

Latin Catholic jurisdiction in Ukraine

Coordinates: 46.4804°N 30.7391°E

Diocese of Odesa-Simferopol Dioecesis Odesensis-Sympheropolitana Одесько-Сімферопольська дієцезія

Catholic
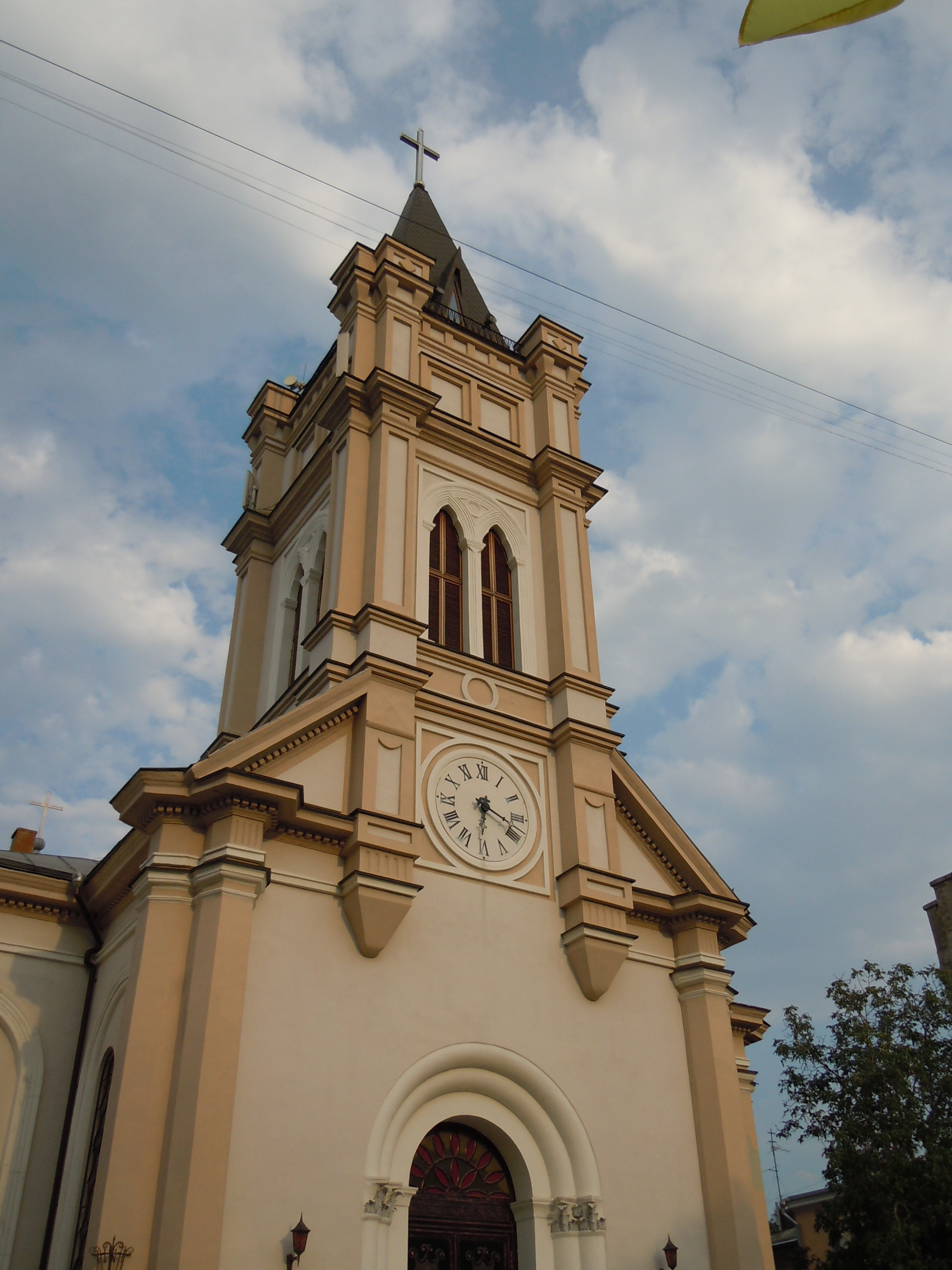

Location
- Country: Ukraine
- Ecclesiastical province: Lviv
- Metropolitan: Archdiocese of Lviv

Statistics
- Area: 138,000 km^{2} (53,000 sq mi)
- Population: Total; Catholics: (as of 2013); 9,980,000; 33,000 (0.3%)

Information
- Denomination: Catholic Church
- Sui iuris church: Latin Church
- Rite: Roman Rite
- Established: 4 May 2002
- Cathedral: Кафедральний собор Успіння Пресвятої Діви Марії; Cathedral of the Blessed Virgin Mary in Odesa

Current leadership
- Pope: Leo XIV
- Bishop: Stanislav Shyrokoradiuk, O.F.M.
- Metropolitan Archbishop: Mieczysław Mokrzycki
- Auxiliary Bishops: Jacek Pyl, O.M.I.

Map
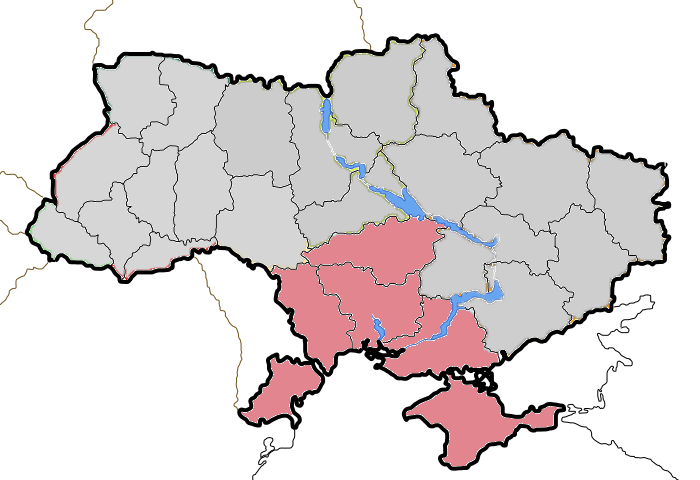
- Location of the Diocese of Odesa-Simferopol

The Diocese of Odesa-Simferopol (Latin: Dioecesis Odesensis-Sympheropolitana) is a Latin Church ecclesiastical territory or diocese of the Catholic Church in southern Ukraine and Crimea. A significant part of the Latin Church in Ukraine, it covers an area equivalent to about one-third the size of Poland including areas impacted by annexation of Crimea by the Russian Federation, and the 2014 pro-Russian unrest in Ukraine. Since 2014, there has been a de facto inter-state border that splits the diocese.

Bronislaw Bernacki was the bishop of the diocese until 2020. He was appointed to the See of Odesa-Simferopol in May 2002 and is based in Odesa. Stanislav Shyrokoradiuk is the current bishop.

== History ==
The history of the diocese begins in 2002, when the diocese of Odesa-Simferopol was erected from the Diocese of Kamyanets-Podilskyi. The diocese's "basic work" began about the time of the Fall of the Soviet Union in 1991. Until 1993 this territory was formally part of the Diocese of Tiraspol.

Auxiliary bishop Pyl described the diocese in 2014 as “missionary territory” with “many challenges.” He reported that there were about 64 priests and 3,000 faithful in the diocese. In 2014, in Crimea there were seven parishes and 13 priests and masses were celebrated mainly in Russian but also in English, Spanish, Ukrainian, and Polish.

As of 2014, Simferopol does not have a co-cathedral. “We have been waiting for the last 20 years to get permission to build a church,” Bishop Pyl is quoted as saying. Plans for a co-cathedral had been underway but were put on hold following Russian annexation of Crimea.

== Geography ==
The diocese is a suffragan of the Archdiocese of Lviv of the Latins.

== Bishops ==
- Bishop Bronislaw Bernacki (4 May 2002 – 18 February 2020)
  - Auxiliary Bishop Petro Herkulan Malchuk, O.F.M. (29 March 2008 – 15 June 2011)
  - Auxiliary Bishop Jacek Pyl, O.M.I. (23 November 2012 – )
- Coadjutor Bishop Stanislav Shyrokoradiuk, O.F.M. (2 February 2019 – 18 February 2020)
- Bishop Stanislav Shyrokoradiuk (18 February 2020 – present)

== See also ==
- Catholic Church in Ukraine
