= Jacek Pyl =

Jacek Pyl, O.M.I.
- Titular Bishop of Nova Sinna, Auxiliary Bishop of Roman Catholic Diocese of Odesa-Simferopol, Delegate of the Holy See for the apostolic district of Crimea and Sevastopol
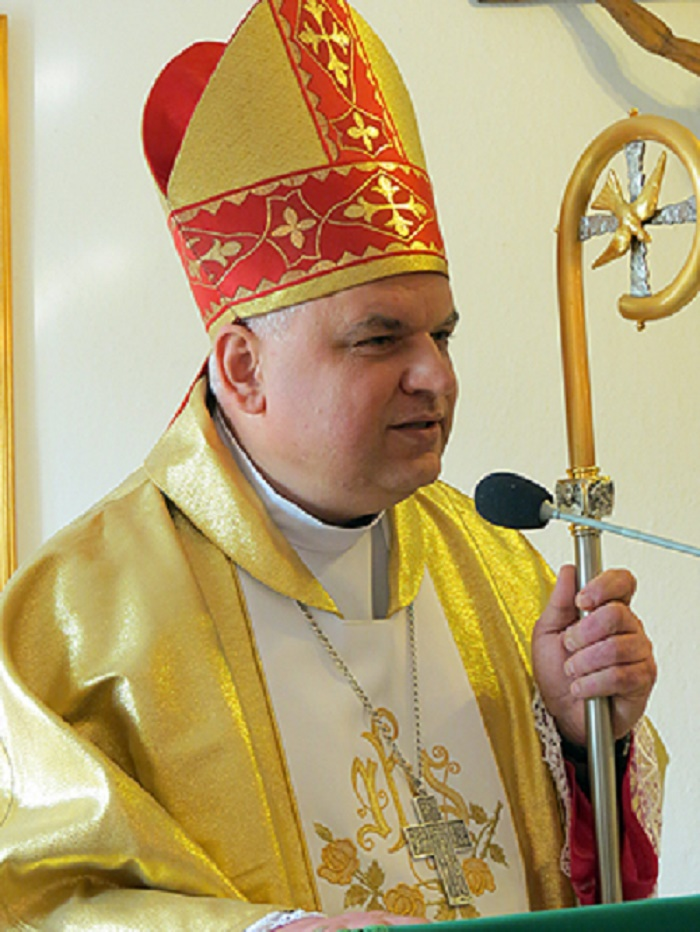
- Church: Roman Catholic Church
- Appointed: 23 November 2012
- Successor: Incumbent
- Other post: Superior of the Delegature of Missionary Oblates in Ukraine (1997–2006, 2012)

Orders
- Ordination: 20 June 1988 (Priest) by Jerzy Stroba
- Consecration: 5 January 2013 (Bishop) by Bronislaw Bernacki

Personal details
- Born: Jacek Pyl; 17 August 1962 (age 63) Garwolin, Polish People's Republic
- Coat of arms

Bishop Jacek Pyl, O.M.I. (Ukrainian: Яцек Пиль; Polish: Jacek Pyl; born 17 August 1962 in Garwolin, Poland) is a Polish-born Ukrainian Roman Catholic prelate, who serves as an Auxiliary bishop of the Roman Catholic Diocese of Odesa-Simferopol and the Titular Bishop of Nova Sinna since 21 October 2006. Since 2013 he has been living in Simferopol, Crimea and after Russian anexation of the peninsula was appointed delegate of the Holy See for the apostolic district of Crimea and Sevastopol.

== Life ==
Bishop Pyl was born in the Roman-Catholic family in a present-day Masovian Voivodeship. After graduation of the school education, he joined the Missionary Oblates of Mary Immaculate in 1977; he made a solemn profession on 8 September 1986, and was ordained as priest on 20 June 1988, after graduation of the Major Missionary Oblates Theological Seminary in Obra, Poland and Theological faculty of the Adam Mickiewicz University in Poznań, Poland.

After his ordination he served as an assistant novice master for the Missionary Oblates in Poland from 1988 until 1990, when he has been transferred to Ukraine. Fr. Pyl served in the Missionary Oblates parishes in the different regions of Ukraine. When in 1997 was established the Delegature of Missionary Oblates of Mary Immaculate in Ukraine, he became its first Superior until 2006. Also he again served as a Superior of the Delegature for a short time in 2012.

On 23 November 2012 he was appointed by the Pope Benedict XVI as the Auxiliary Bishop of the Roman Catholic Diocese of Odesa-Simferopol and Titular Bishop of Nova Sinna. On 5 January 2013 he was consecrated as bishop by Bishop Bronislaw Bernacki and other prelates of the Roman Catholic Church.

From 2013 he is residing in Simferopol.

Catholic Church titles
Preceded by Noël Simard	Titular Bishop of Nova Sinna; 2012–	Succeeded by Incumbent
