= Diocese of Saint Clement at Saratov =

Roman Catholic diocese in Russia

Diocese of Saint Clement at Saratov Dioecesis Saratoviensis Sancti Clementis Епархия Святого Климента в Саратове
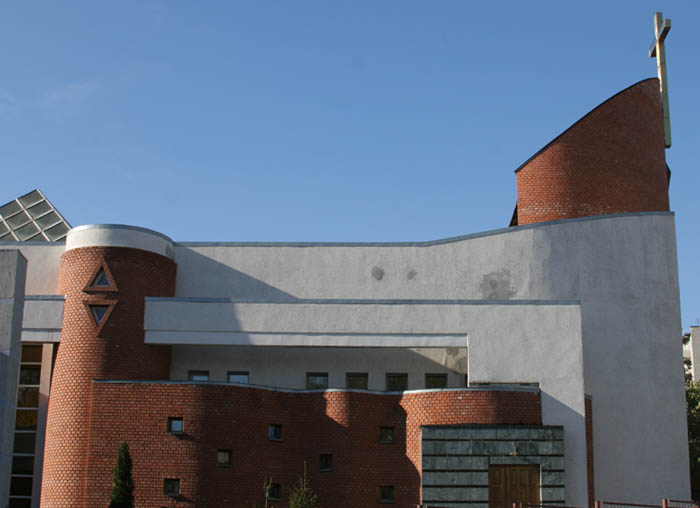
- Cathedral of the Holy Apostles Peter and Paul

Location
- Country: Russia
- Metropolitan: Mother of God at Moscow
- Coordinates: 51°31′39″N 46°02′41″E

Statistics
- Area: 1,400,000 km^{2} (540,000 sq mi)
- Population: Total; Catholics: (as of 2010); 45,000,000; 20,000 (0.1%)

Information
- Denomination: Catholic Church
- Sui iuris church: Latin Church
- Rite: Roman Rite
- Cathedral: Cathedral of the Holy Apostles Peter and Paul (Собор Святых Апостолов Петра и Павла)

Current leadership
- Pope: Leo XIV
- Bishop: Clemens Pickel

Map
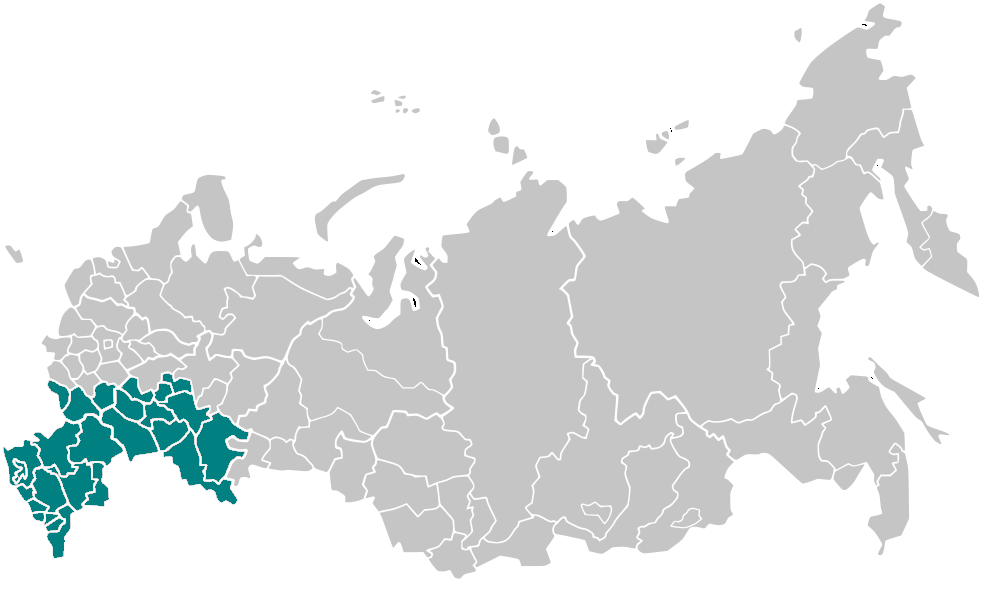

The Diocese of Saint Clement at Saratov (Latin: Dioecesis Saratoviensis Sancti Clementis) is a Latin Church ecclesiastical territory or diocese of the Catholic Church in Russia. The diocese's episcopal see is located in the city of Saratov. The Diocese of Saint Clement at Saratov is a suffragan diocese in the ecclesiastical province of the metropolitan Mother of God at Moscow.

== History ==
- 1848: Roman Catholic Diocese of Tiraspol with the see in Saratov since 1852
- November 23, 1999: Established as Apostolic Administration of Southern European Russia from the Apostolic Administration of European Russia
- February 11, 2002: Promoted as Diocese of Saint Clement at Saratov

== Leadership ==
- Bishops of Saint Clement at Saratov (Roman rite)
  - Bishop Clemens Pickel (since 2002.02.11)
- Apostolic Administrators of Southern European Russia (Roman rite)
  - Bishop Clemens Pickel (1999.11.23 – 2002.02.11)

== Churches ==
- Church of the Exaltation of the Holy Cross, Tambov
- St. Liborius Church, Krasnodar
- St. Nicholas' Church, Volgograd
- The Last Supper Church, Rostov-on-Don
- Transfiguration Church, Pyatigorsk

== See also ==
- Roman Catholicism in Russia
- Roman Catholic Diocese of Tiraspol (Russia)

== Sources ==
- GCatholic.org
- Catholic Hierarchy
