= Clemens Pickel =

Roman Catholic bishop (born 1961)

The Most Reverend Clemens Pickel
- Bishop of Saratov
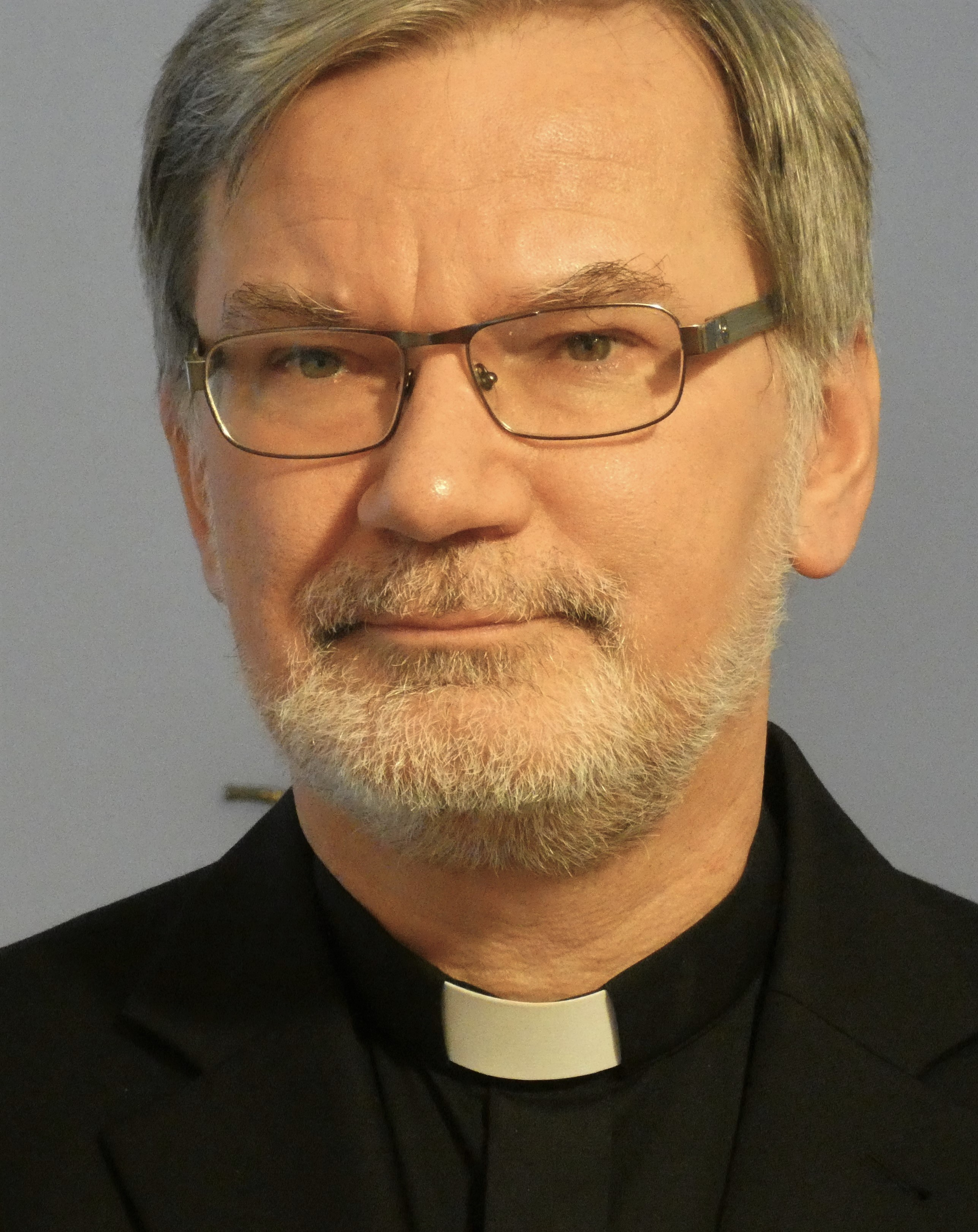
- Diocese: Diocese of Saint Clement at Saratov
- Appointed: 11 February 2002

Orders
- Ordination: 25 June 1988 (priest)
- Consecration: 7 June 1998 by John Bukovsky

Personal details
- Born: 17 August 1961 (age 65) Colditz, Bezirk Leipzig, East Germany (now Saxony, Germany)
- Denomination: Roman Catholic
- Coat of arms

Clemens Pickel (German: Clemens Pickel, born 17 August 1961) is a German Roman Catholic prelate, and Bishop of Saratov, Russia. Pickel is the current chairman of the Episcopal Conference of Russia.

== Education ==
From 1968 till 1978 he learned at school, in 1978–1981 in the pre-seminary «Norbertinum» in Magdeburg. In 1981–1986 Pickel studied at the Graduate Theological Seminary "St. Albert the Great" in Erfurt, in 1987/1988 in the pastoral seminary in Neuzelle.

== Priesthood ==
Pickel was ordained a deacon on 19 December 1987, and a priest on 25 June 1988. From 1988–1990 he was vicar of the parish of St. Mary Magdalene in the town Kamenz (Saxony). On 1 August 1990 he was released for pastoral work in the USSR. From 1990 he was engaged in pastoral activities in the territory of former Soviet republics. In 1990/1991 he worked as vicar in the parishes in Tajikistan (Dushanbe, Kurgan-Tyube, Vakhsh). From 1991 the rector of the parish of Christ the King in Marx. From 1992 to 1998 he was dean in the Pavolskaga region, since 1998 member of the Apostolic Administration of priests to Catholics of Latin rite of the European part of Russia. On 23 March 1998 Pope John Paul II appointed him Titular Bishop Husyry. Episcopal ordination was on 7 June 1998 in Marks, when he became the youngest bishop in Europe. On 23 November 1999 Apostolic Administrator of the South European part of Russia. From 1999 Member of the Conference of Catholic Bishops of Russia, Chairman of the Commission on Affairs of the parishioners, and youth movements and the Commission KKER "pastoral – a vocation." Since 2001 he is a member of the Pontifical Council "Cor unum". On 11 February 2002 he became bishop of the Diocese of Saint Clement in Saratov. On 15 December 2003 Pickel finally got a residence permit in Russia.
