= Polish minority in Russia =

Ethnic minority in Russia

Poles in Russia
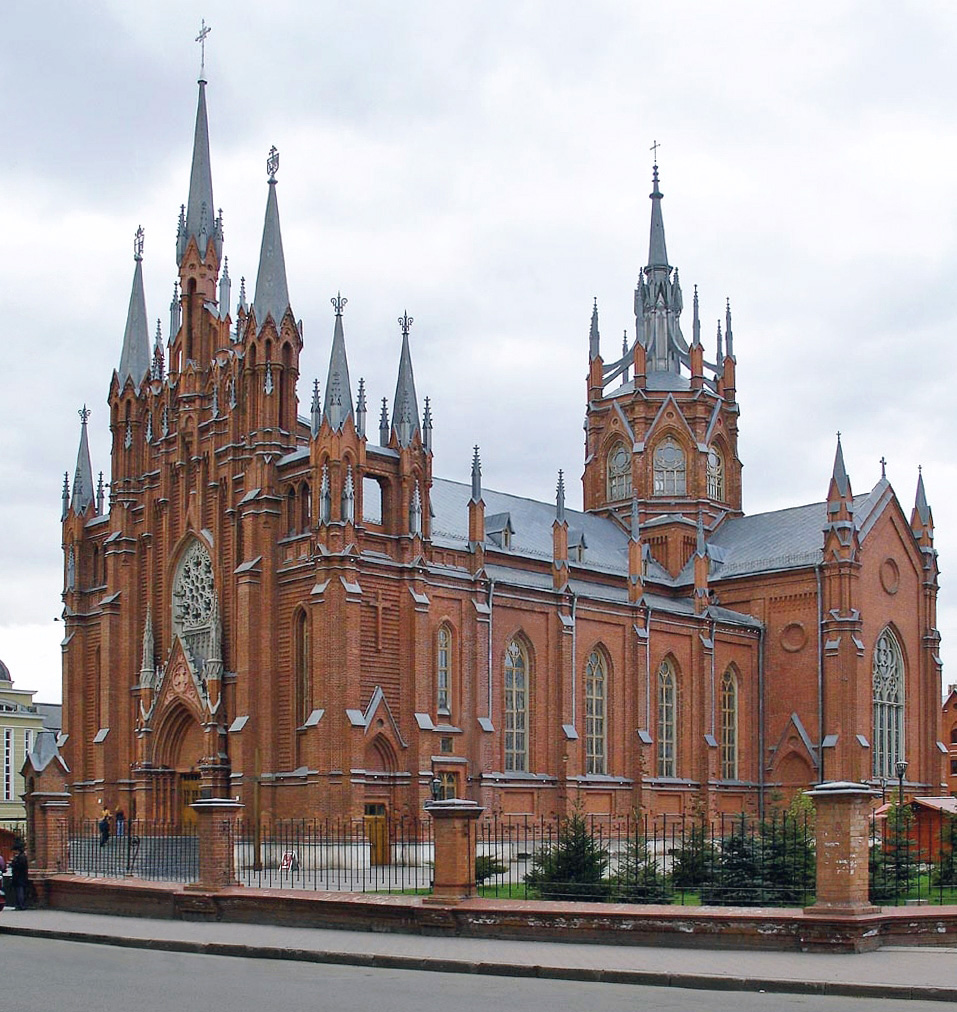
- The Cathedral of the Immaculate Conception of the Holy Virgin Mary in Moscow was built from 1899–1911 by Polish architect Tomasz Bohdanowicz-Dworzecki. It holds Polish-language services.

Total population
- 22,024 (2021)

Regions with significant populations
- Moscow, Saint Petersburg, Kaliningrad Oblast, Tyumen Oblast, Omsk Oblast, Moscow Oblast, Republic of Karelia, Sverdlovsk Oblast

Religion
- Majority Roman Catholicism; Minority Eastern Orthodox Church

Related ethnic groups
- Polish diaspora

There are currently more than 22,000 ethnic Poles living in the Russian Federation. This includes native Poles as well as those forcibly deported during and after World War II. When including all of the countries of the former Soviet Union, the total number of Poles is estimated at up to 3 million.

== History ==
=== 1652, Smolensk Boyars from Polish-Lithuanian Commonwealth ===
Zainsk, Kazan governate, was originally a fort occupied by Chelny strelsty, archers and servicemen, and 81 Polish Cossask prisoners from Smolensk area after the Polish Lithuanian Commonwealth.

=== 1654, Polotsk Gentry from Polish-Lithuanian Commonwealth ===
In 1654 the Poles were taken from Polotsk, 141 people from the Polish small gentry were evacuated to Tiinsk together with the Cossacks, who, before that, "universal servants of Polish kings carried serfdom". Another party of the Polish gentry was settled in the settlement of Old Kuvak [Старой Куваке] and Old Pismyanka [Старой Письмянке] of the future Bugulma district [Бугульминского уезда], Kazan governate. They became part of the Simbirsk Line. Polish gentry until 1830 were considered available soldiers for conscription or draft.

=== 1768 – The Bar Confederation and the Polish–Lithuanian Commonwealth ===
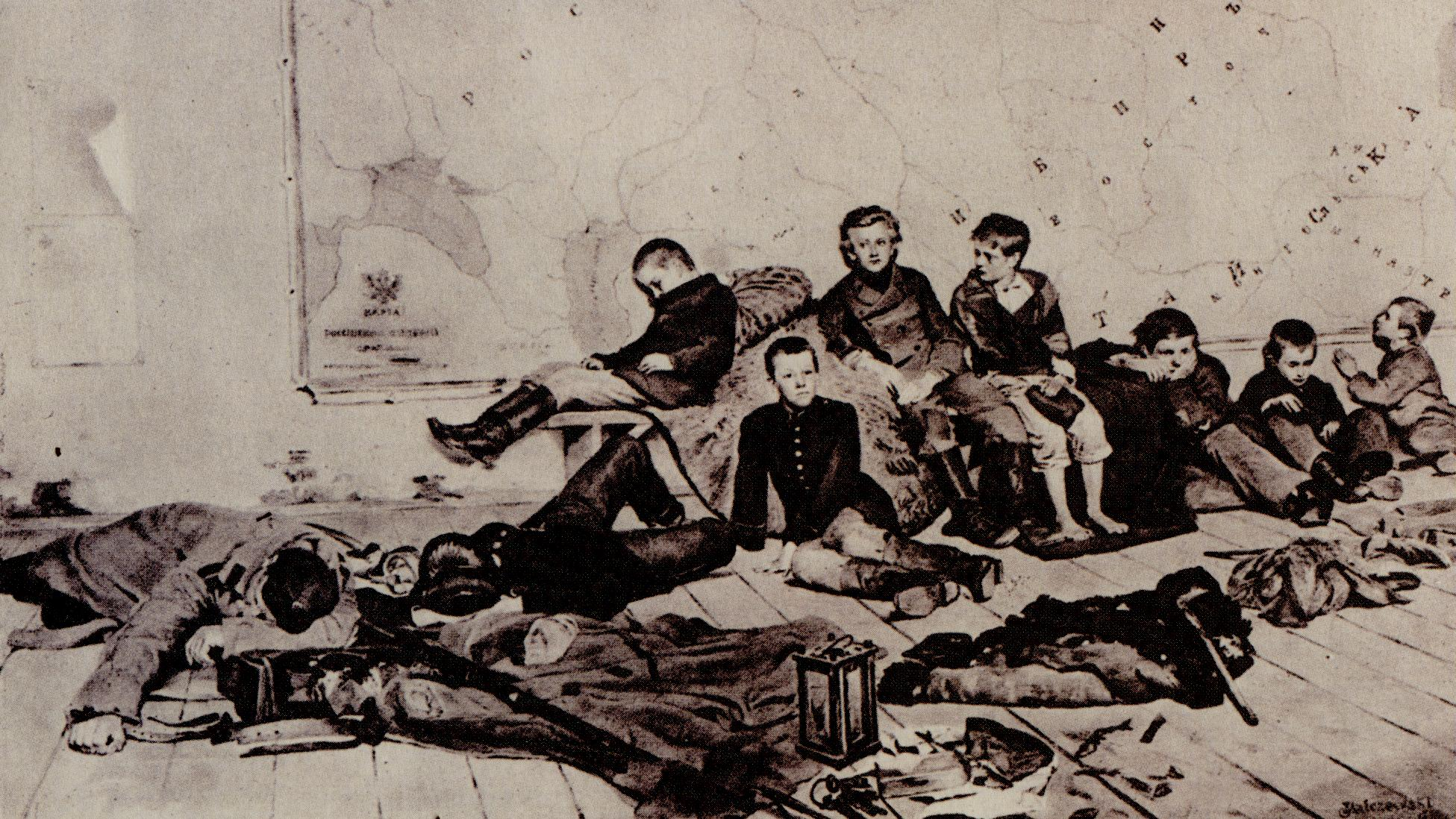
Polish students in Russian exile

Many Poles were exiled to Siberia, starting with the 18th-century opponents of the Russian Empire's increasing influence in the Polish–Lithuanian Commonwealth (most notably the members of the Bar Confederation).

=== Tsarist Russia until 1917 ===
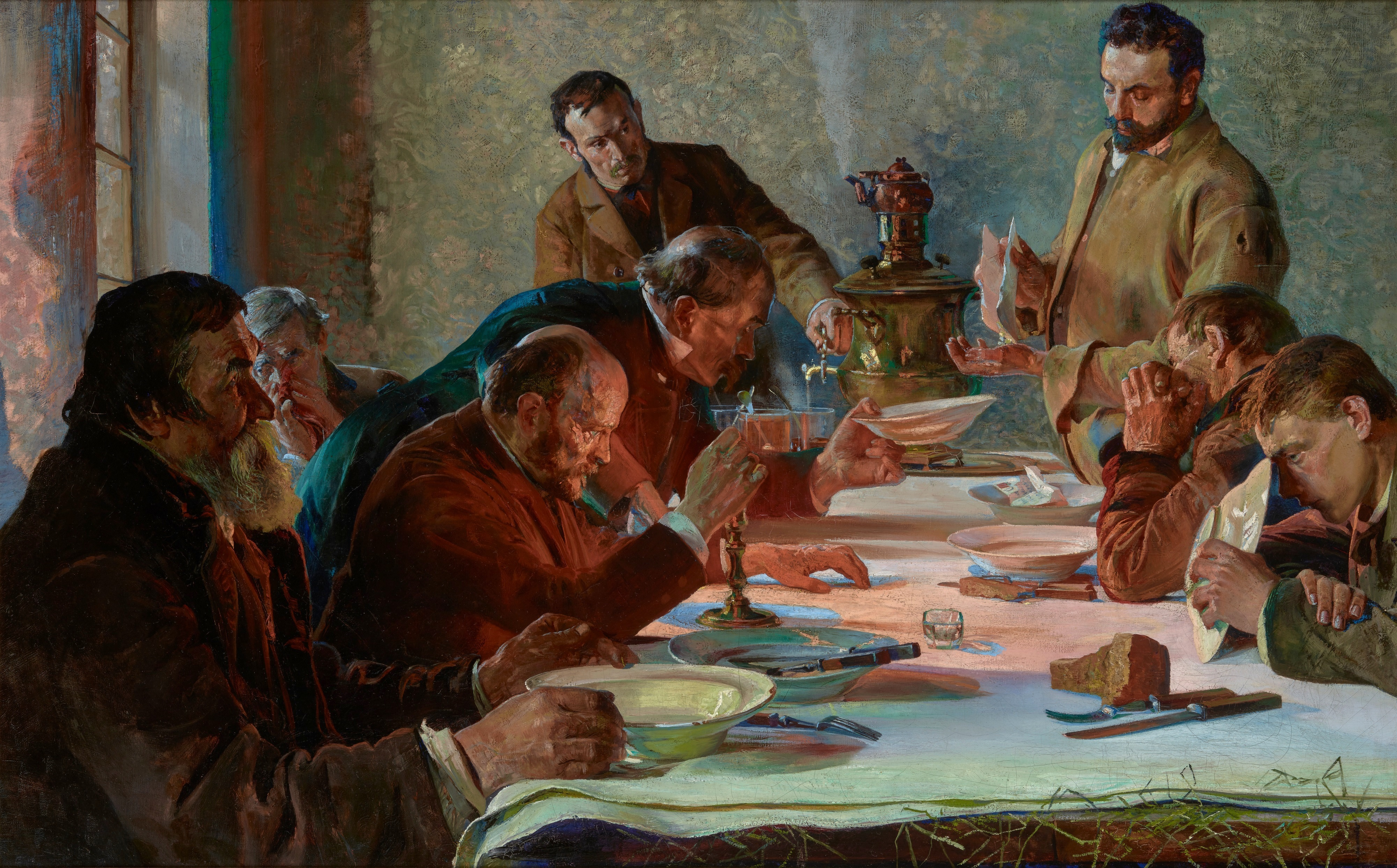
Christmas Eve in Siberia by Jacek Malczewski (1892)

Speakers of Polish in the Russian Empire by region according to the 1897 Imperial Russian census

After the change in Russian penal law in 1847, exile and penal labor (katorga) became common penalties to the participants of national uprisings within the Russian Empire. This led to increasing number of Poles being sent to Siberia for katorga, they were known as Sybiraks. Some of them remained there, forming a Polish minority in Siberia. Most of them came from the participants and supporters of the 19th century November Uprising and January Uprising, the participants of the 1905–1907 unrest to the hundreds of thousands of people deported in the Soviet invasion of Poland in 1939.

Originally, 148 Polish exiles were stationed in the Orenburg province, but by the beginning of June 1864, 278 people had been sent to the Orenburg governate to take up residence under the supervision of the police, and by mid-1865, 506 people. In addition, 831 people were identified for establishment on the state lands of the Orenburg and Chelyabinsk districts, of which 754 people were allocated to Ufa.

There were about 20,000 Poles living in Siberia around the 1860s. An unsuccessful uprising of Polish political exiles in Siberia broke out in 1866.

In the late 19th century there was also a limited number of Polish voluntary settlers, attracted by the economic development of the region. Polish migrants and exiles, many of whom were forbidden to move away from the region even after finishing serving their sentence, formed a vibrant Polish minority there. Hundreds of Poles took part in the construction of the Trans-Siberian Railway. Notable Polish scholars studied in Siberia, among them Aleksander Czekanowski, Jan Czerski, Benedykt Dybowski, Wiktor Godlewski, Sergiusz Jastrzebski, Edward Piekarski, Bronisław Piłsudski, Wacław Sieroszewski, Mikołaj Witkowski and others.

=== In the Soviet Union ===
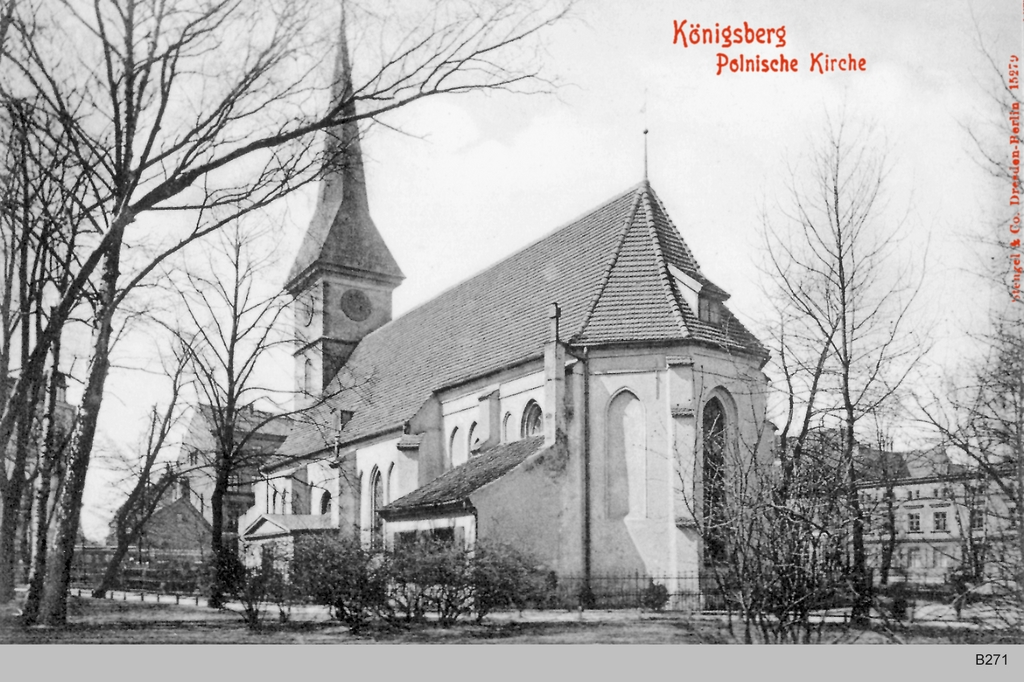
The Polish church in Steindamm was demolished by the Soviet administration in Kaliningrad in 1950.

Millions of Poles lived within the Russian Empire as the Russian Revolution of 1917 started followed by the Russian Civil War. While some Poles associated with the communist movement, the majority of the Polish population saw cooperation with Bolshevik forces as betrayal and treachery of Polish national interests. Marian Lutosławski and his brother Józef, the father of the Polish composer Witold Lutosławski, were murdered in Moscow in 1918 as "counter-revolutionaries". Stanisław Ignacy Witkiewicz lived through the Russian Revolution in St. Petersburg, which had a profound effect on his works, many of which displayed themes of the horrors of social revolution. Famous revolutionaries with Polish origins include Konstantin Rokossovsky, Julian Marchlewski, Karol Świerczewski and Felix Dzerzhinsky, founder of the Cheka secret police which would later turn into the NKVD. However, according to their ideology they did not identify as Poles or with Poland, and members of the communist party viewed themselves as Soviet citizens without any national sentiments. The Soviet Union also organized Polish units in the Red Army and a Polish Communist government-in-exile.

=== In modern Russia ===
There were 73,000 Polish nationals living in Russia according to the 2002 Russian census. This includes autochthonous Poles as well as those forcibly deported during and after World War II; the total number of Poles in what was the former Soviet Union is estimated at up to 3 million. The number of Polish people in Russia decreased to 47,125 in 2010, and to 22,024 in 2021.

== Gallery ==
Former and current Polish churches in European Russia

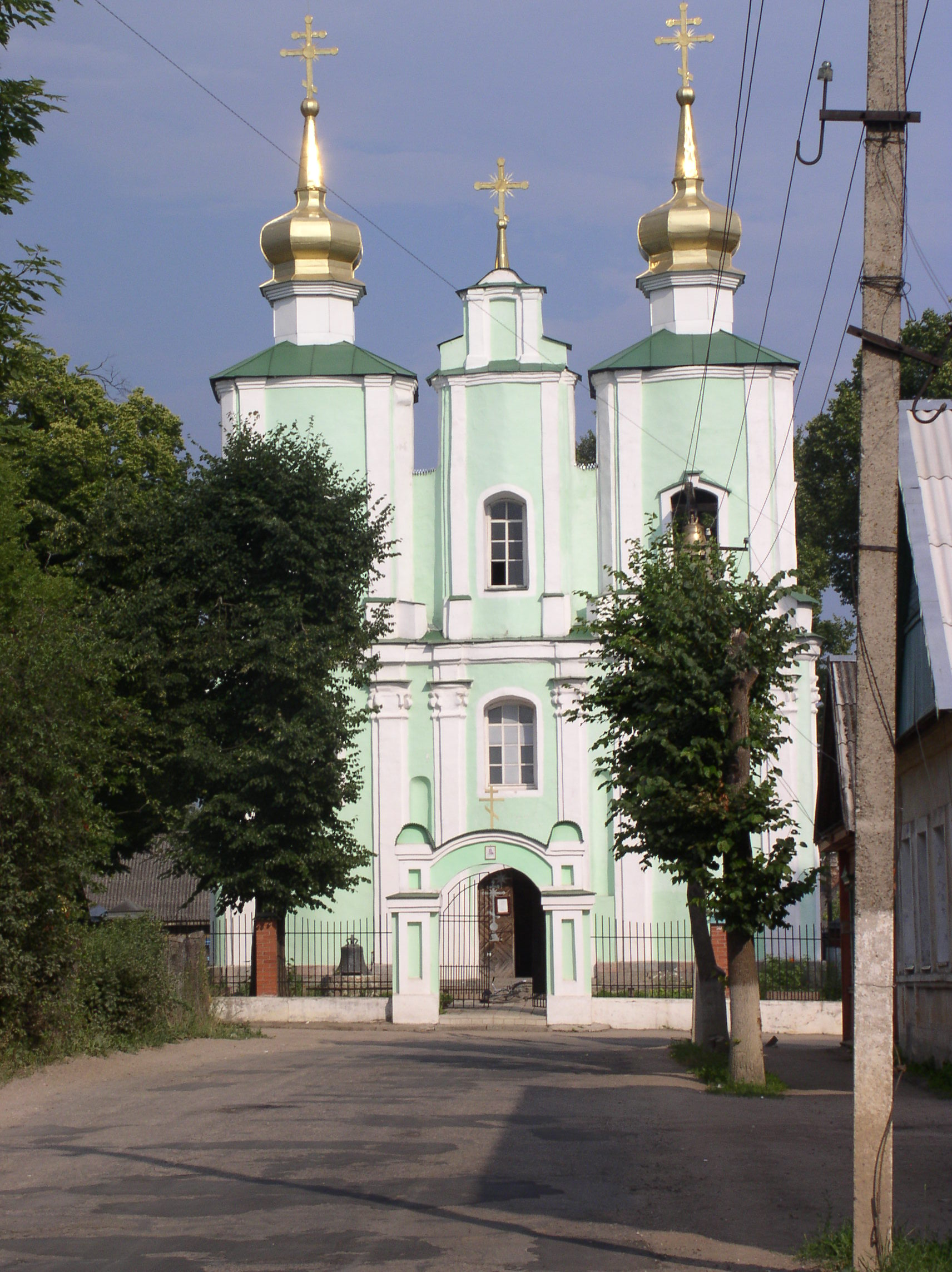
Holy Trinity Church, Sebezh (1648)

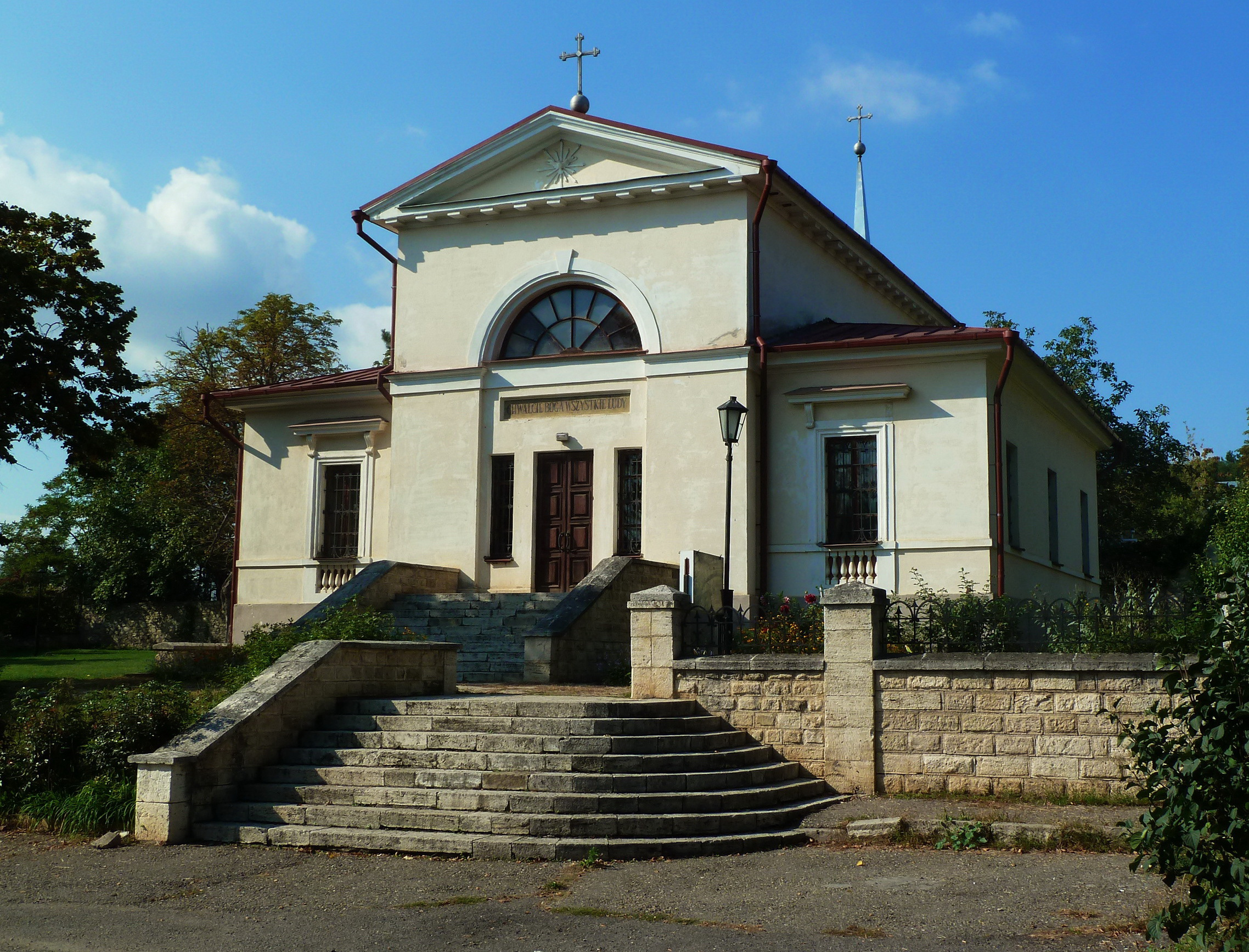
Transfiguration Church, Pyatigorsk (1844)

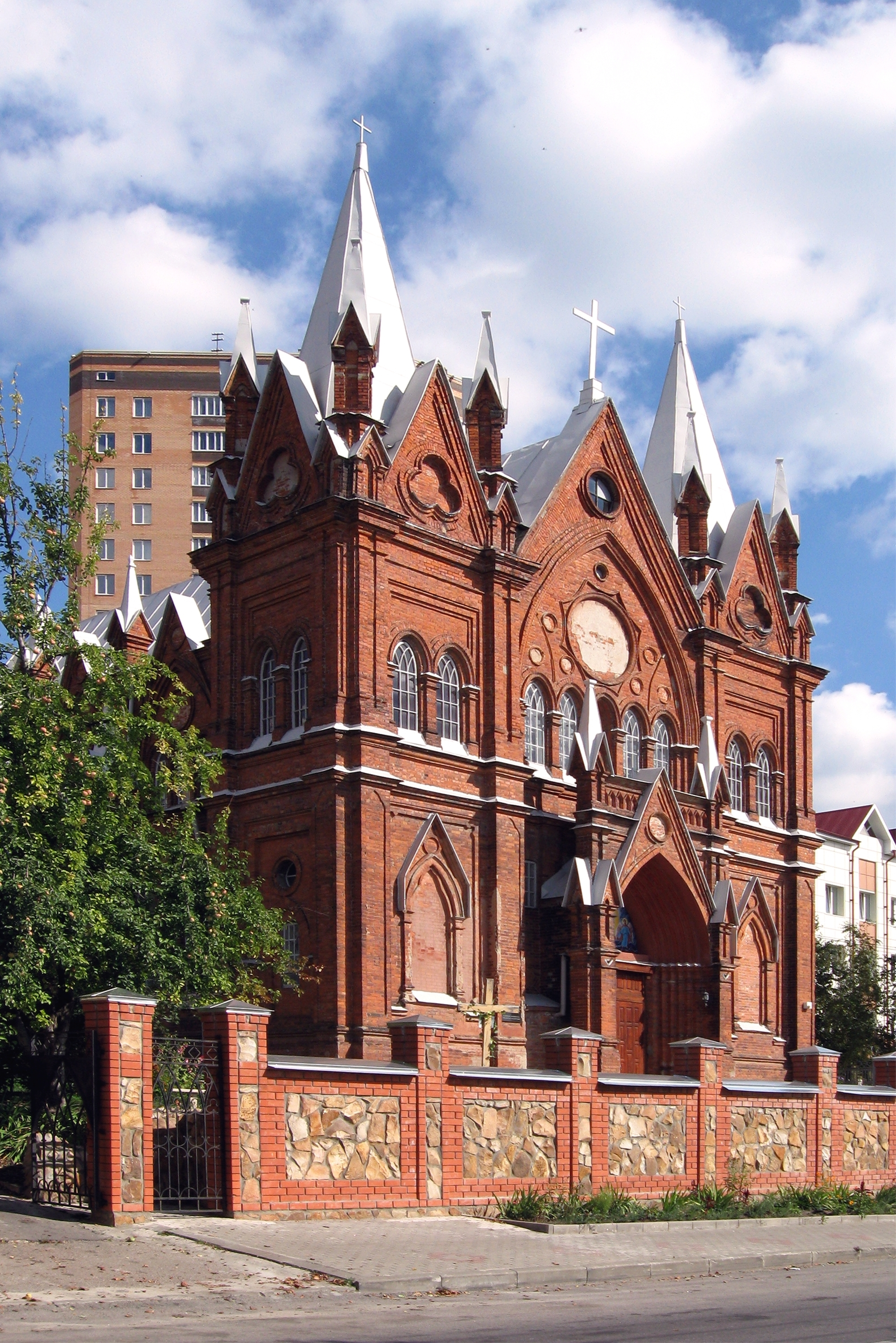
Church of Our Lady of the Assumption, Kursk (1896)

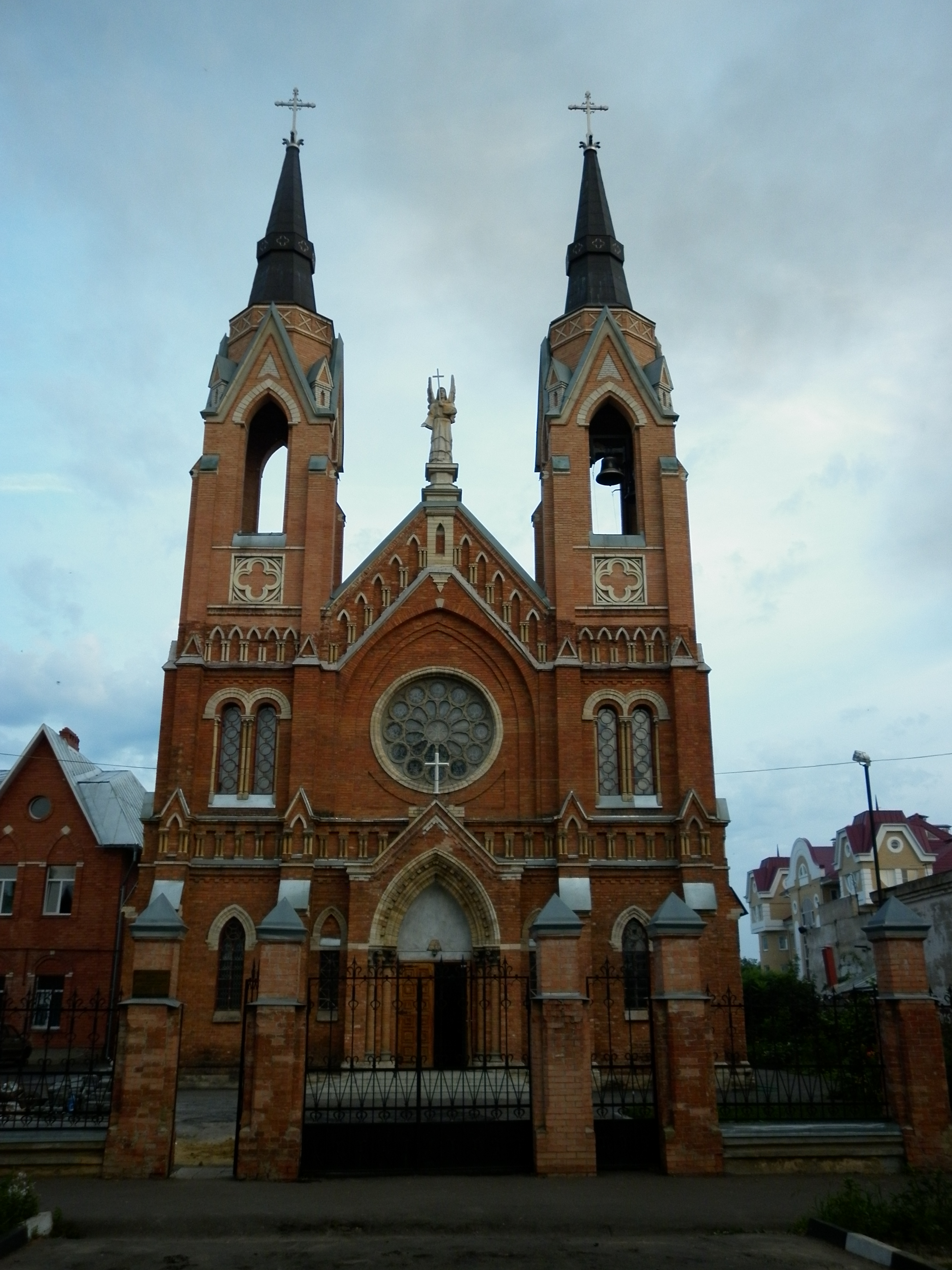
Church of the Exaltation of the Holy Cross, Tambov (1903)

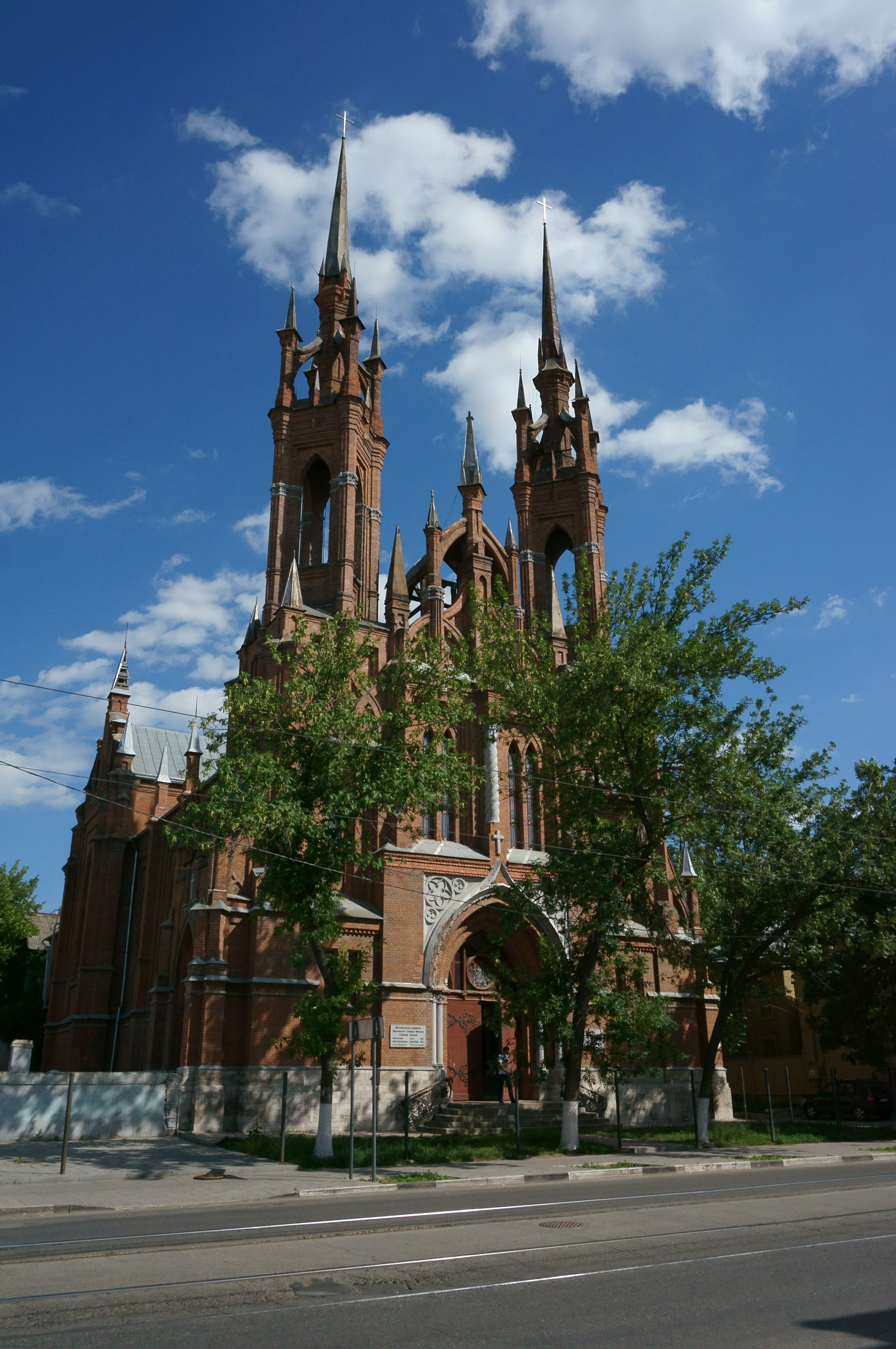
Sacred Heart Church, Samara (1906)

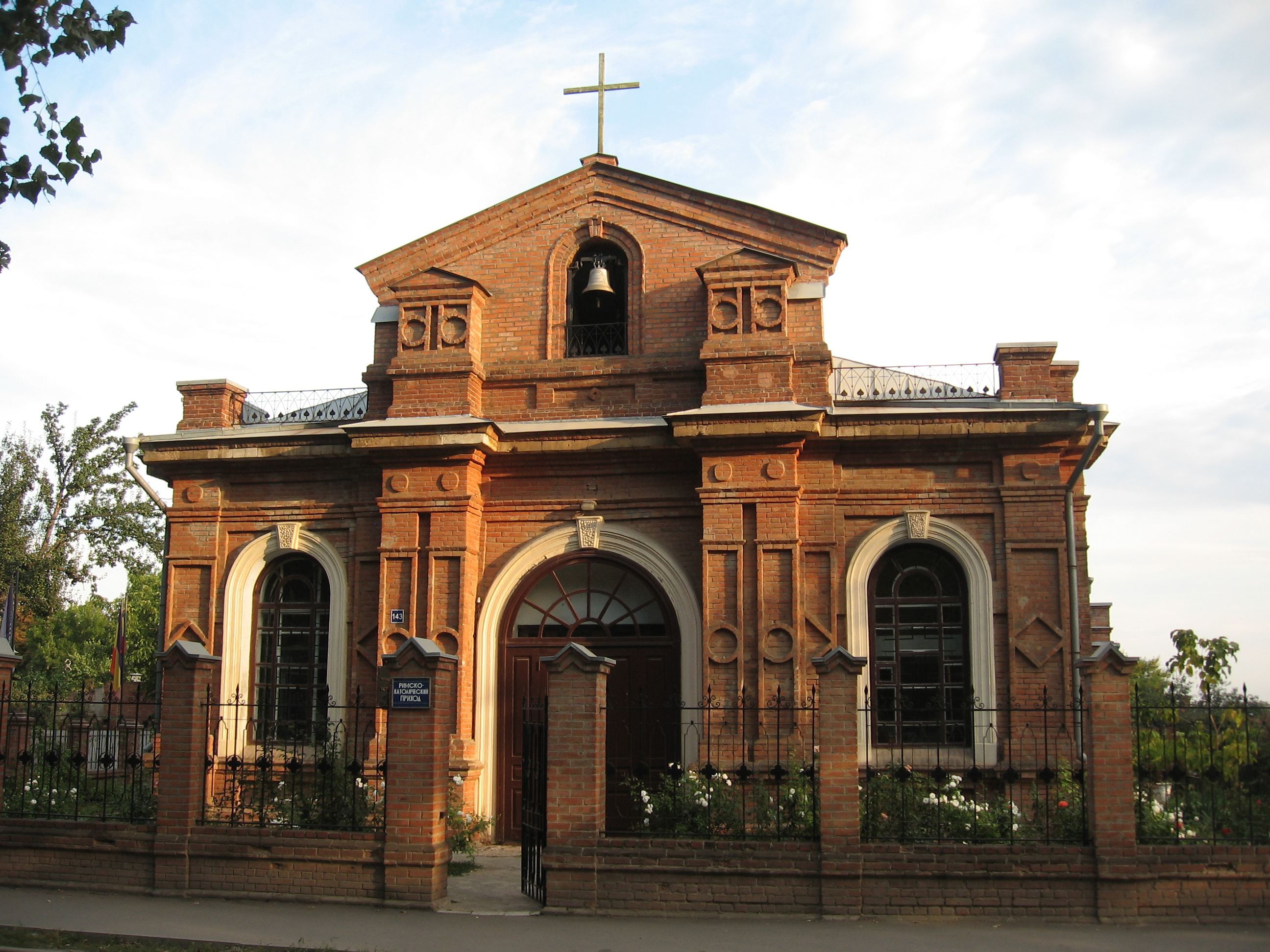
Our Lady of the Assumption Church, Novocherkassk (1906)
Former and current Polish churches in Siberia

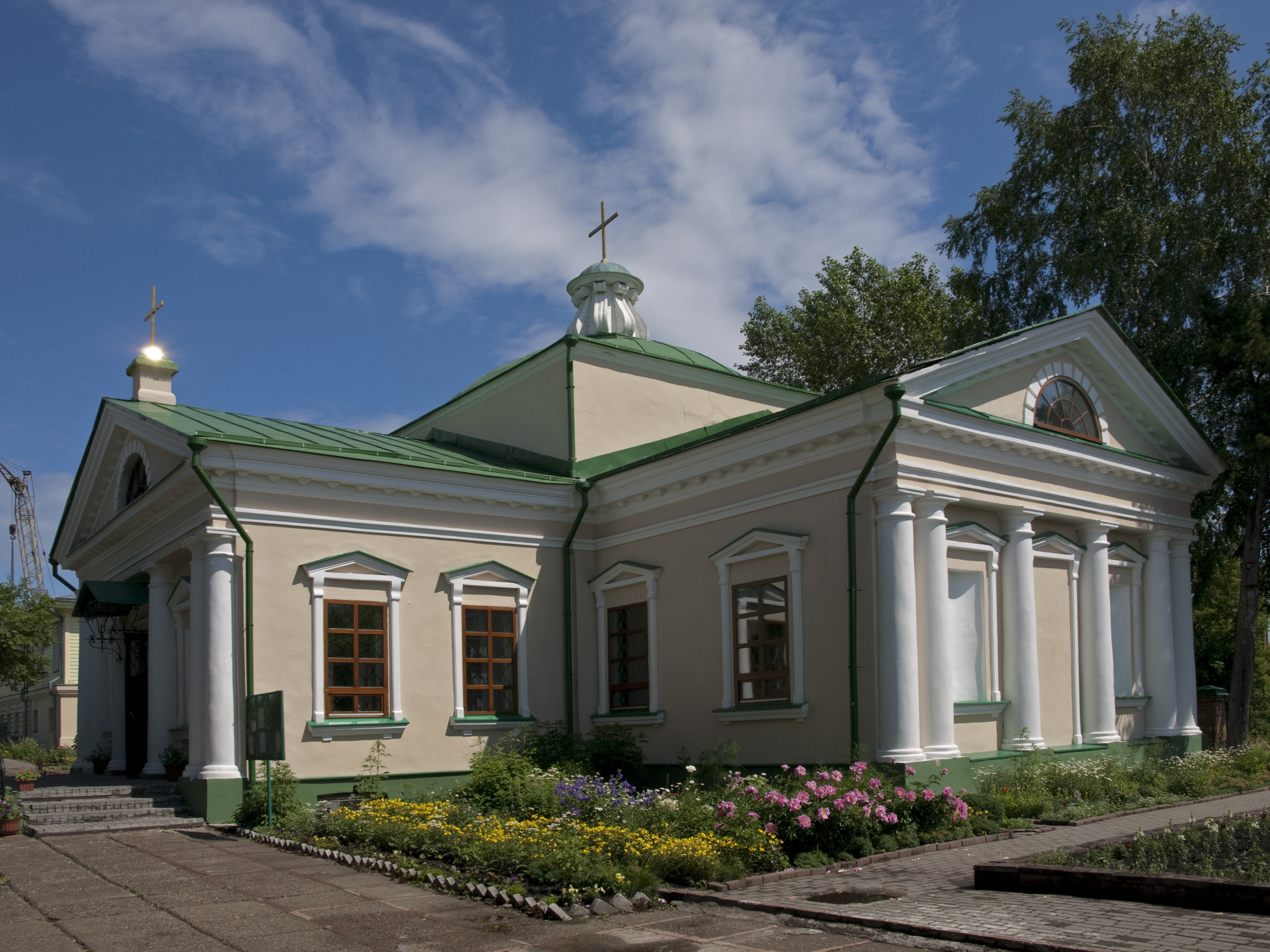
Church of the Intercession of the Virgin Mary, Tomsk (1833)

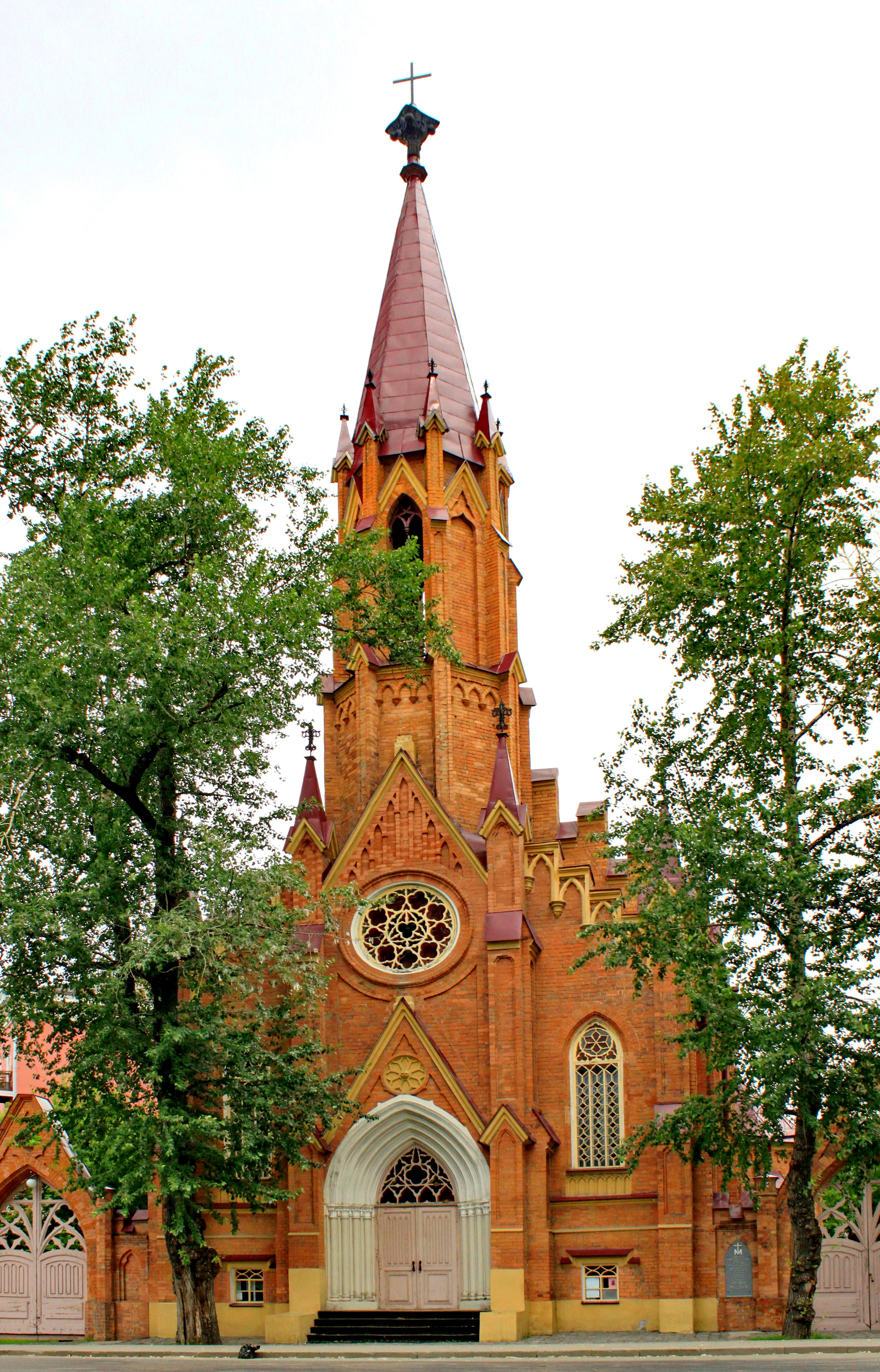
Church of Our Lady of the Assumption, Irkutsk (1884)

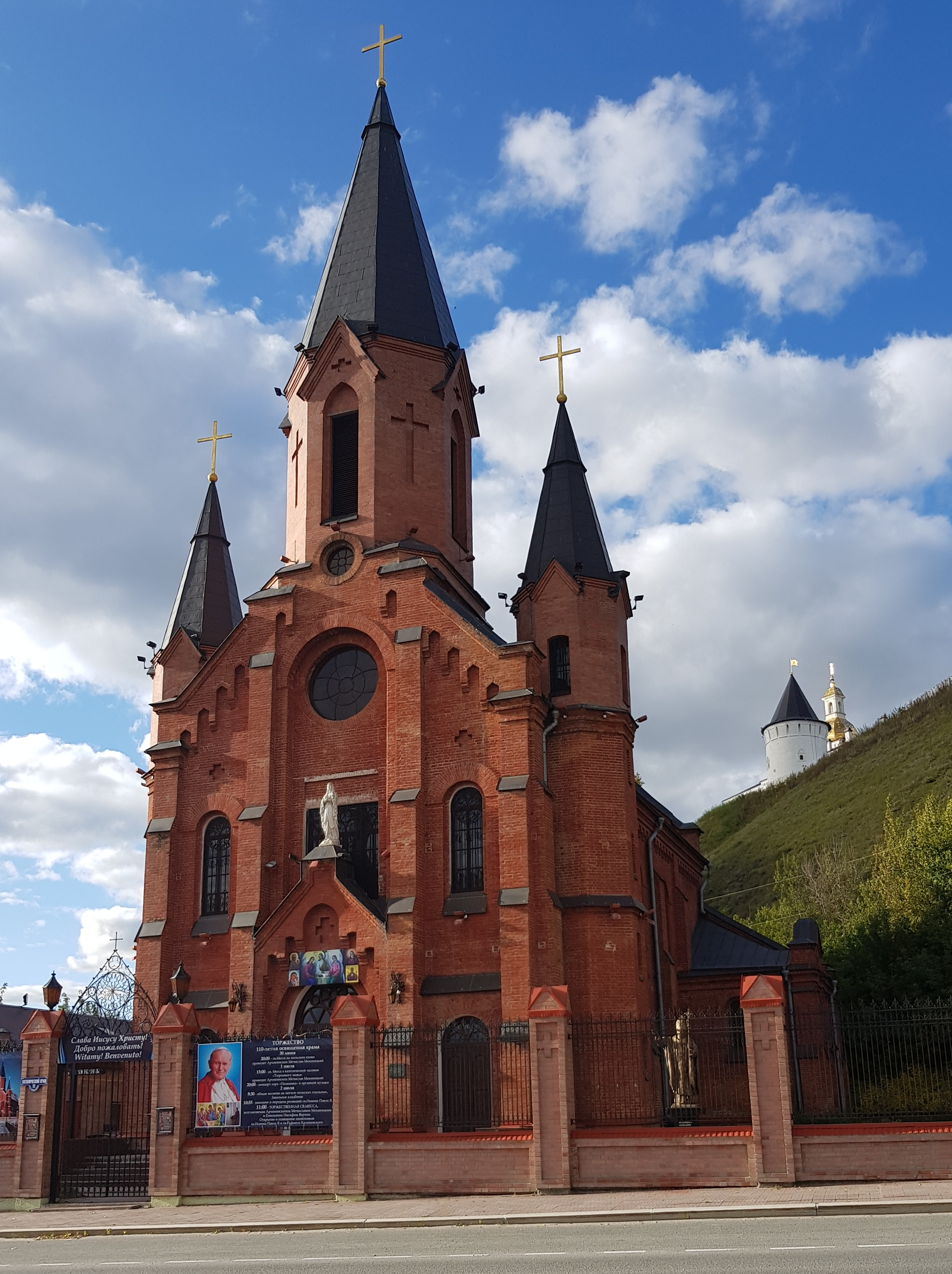
Holy Trinity Church, Tobolsk (1909)

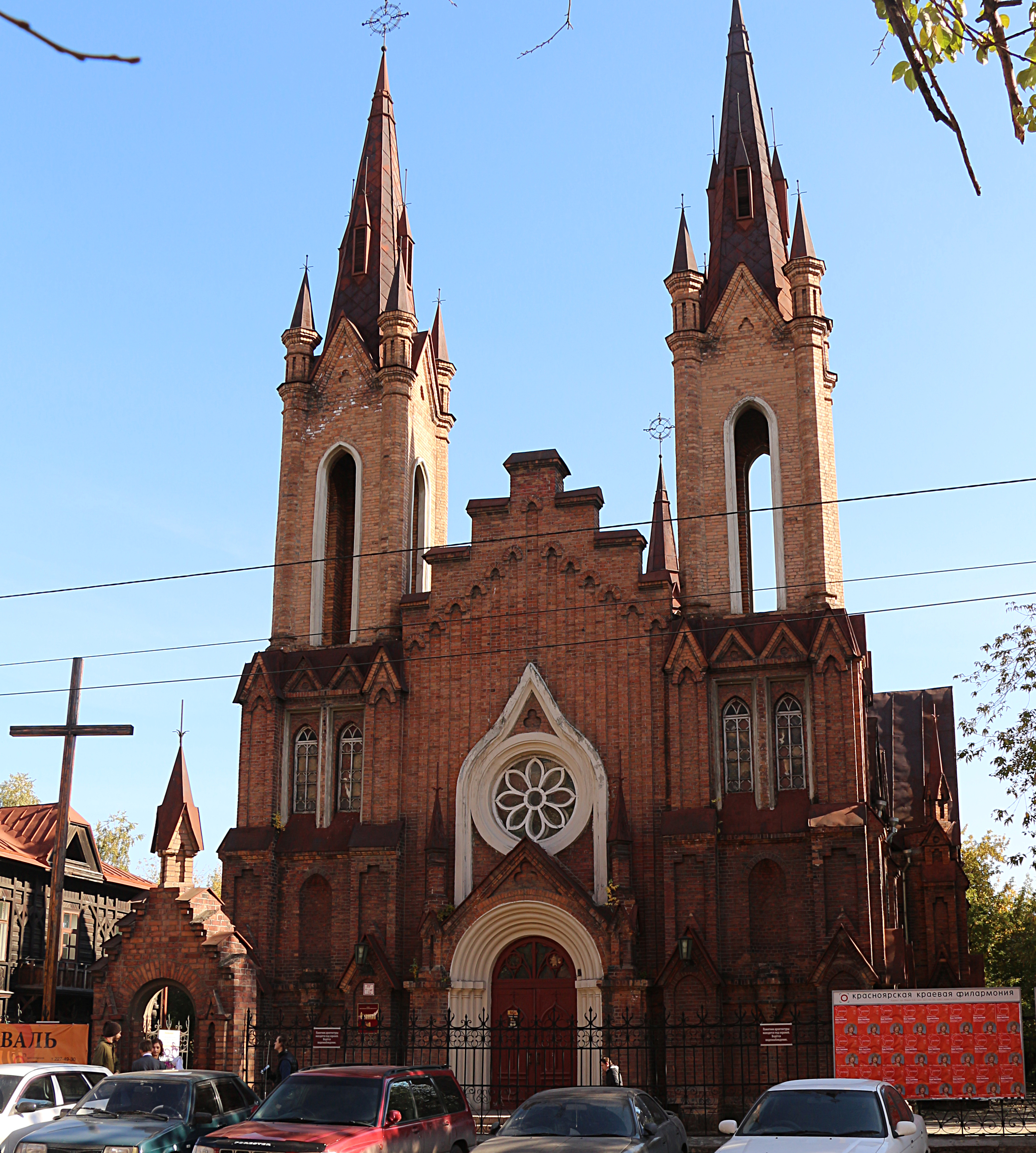
Transfiguration Church, Krasnoyarsk (1910)

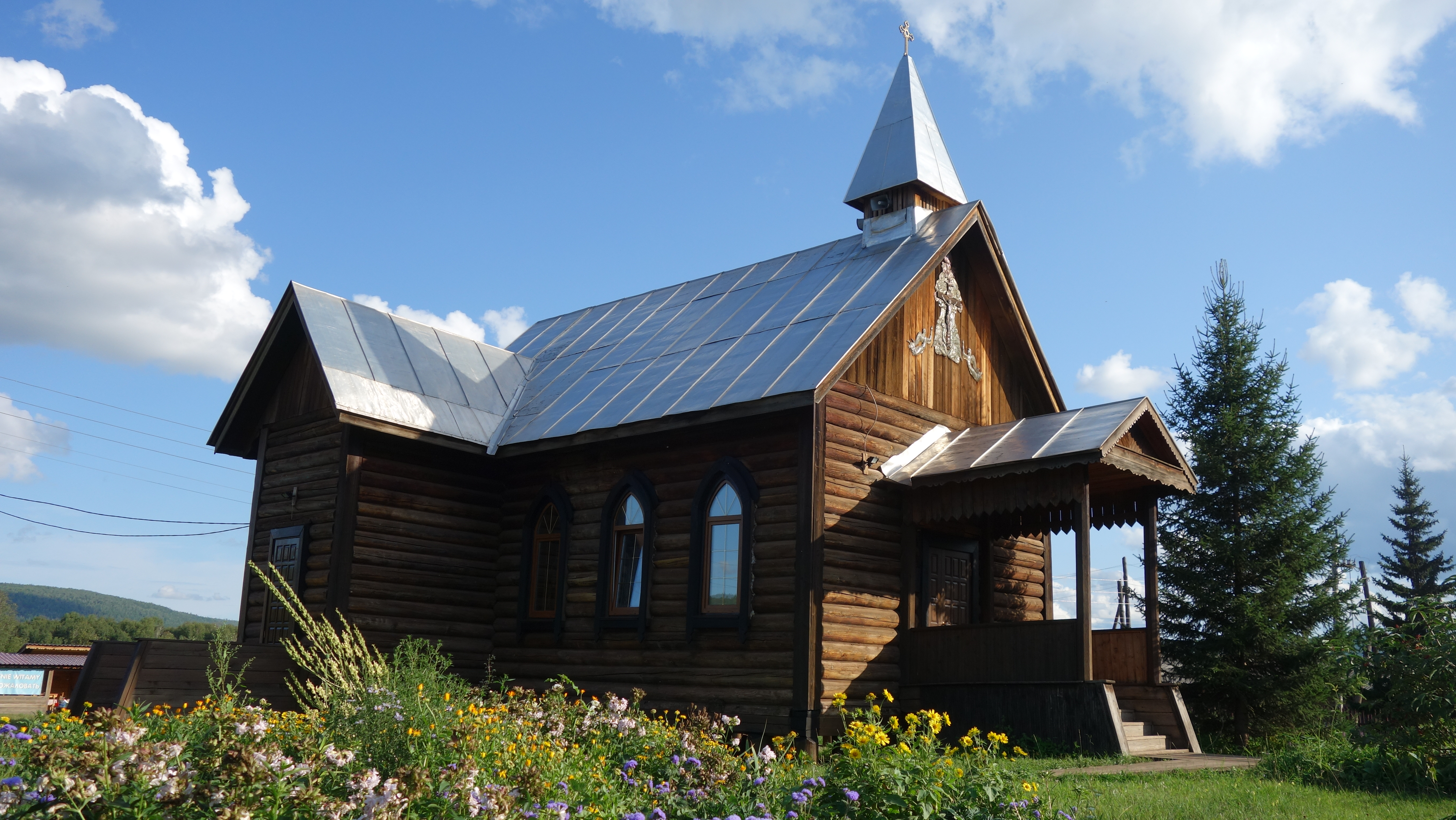
St. Stanislaus Church, Vershina
Other sites

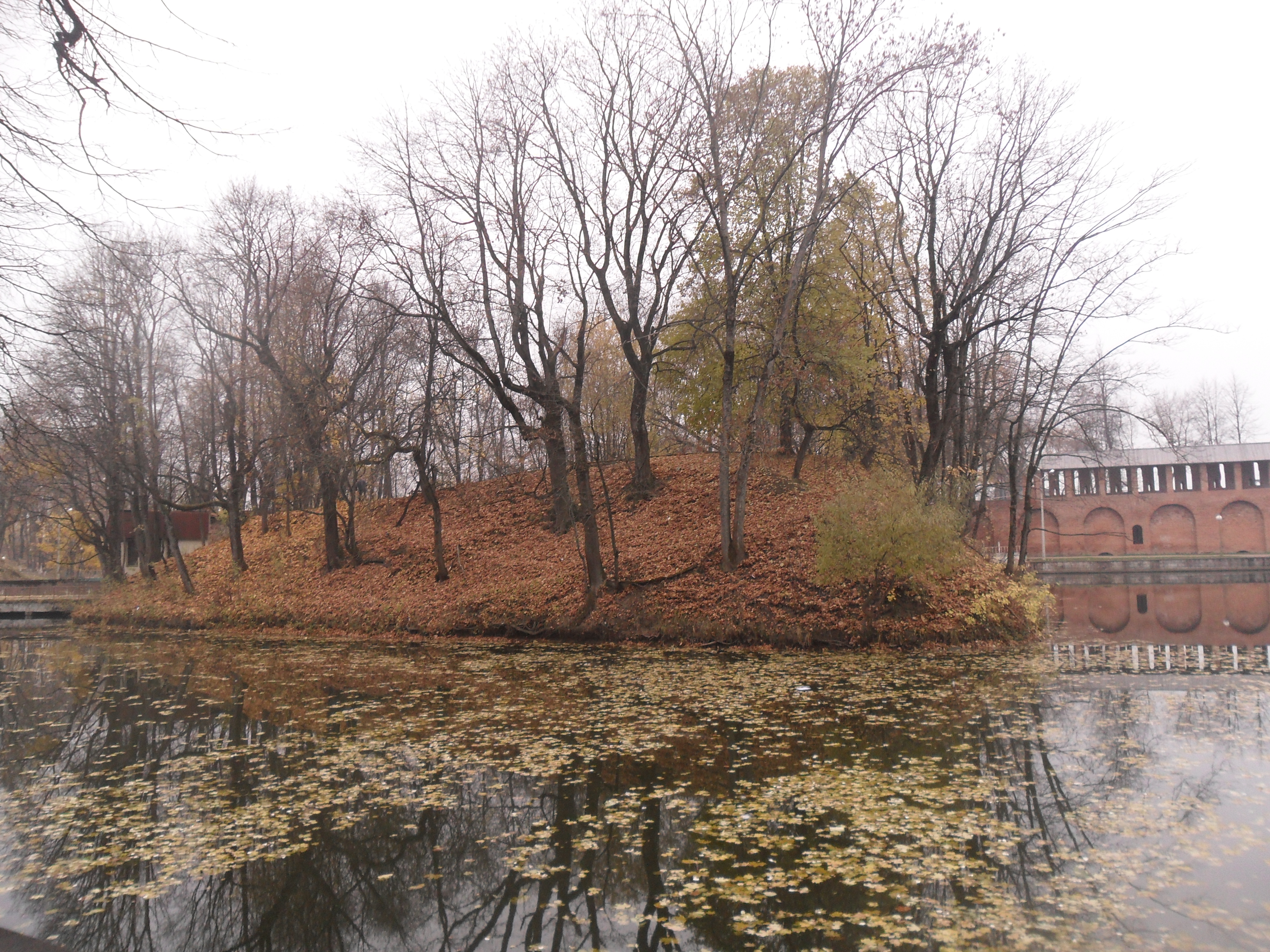
Bastion of King Sigismund III Vasa in Smolensk

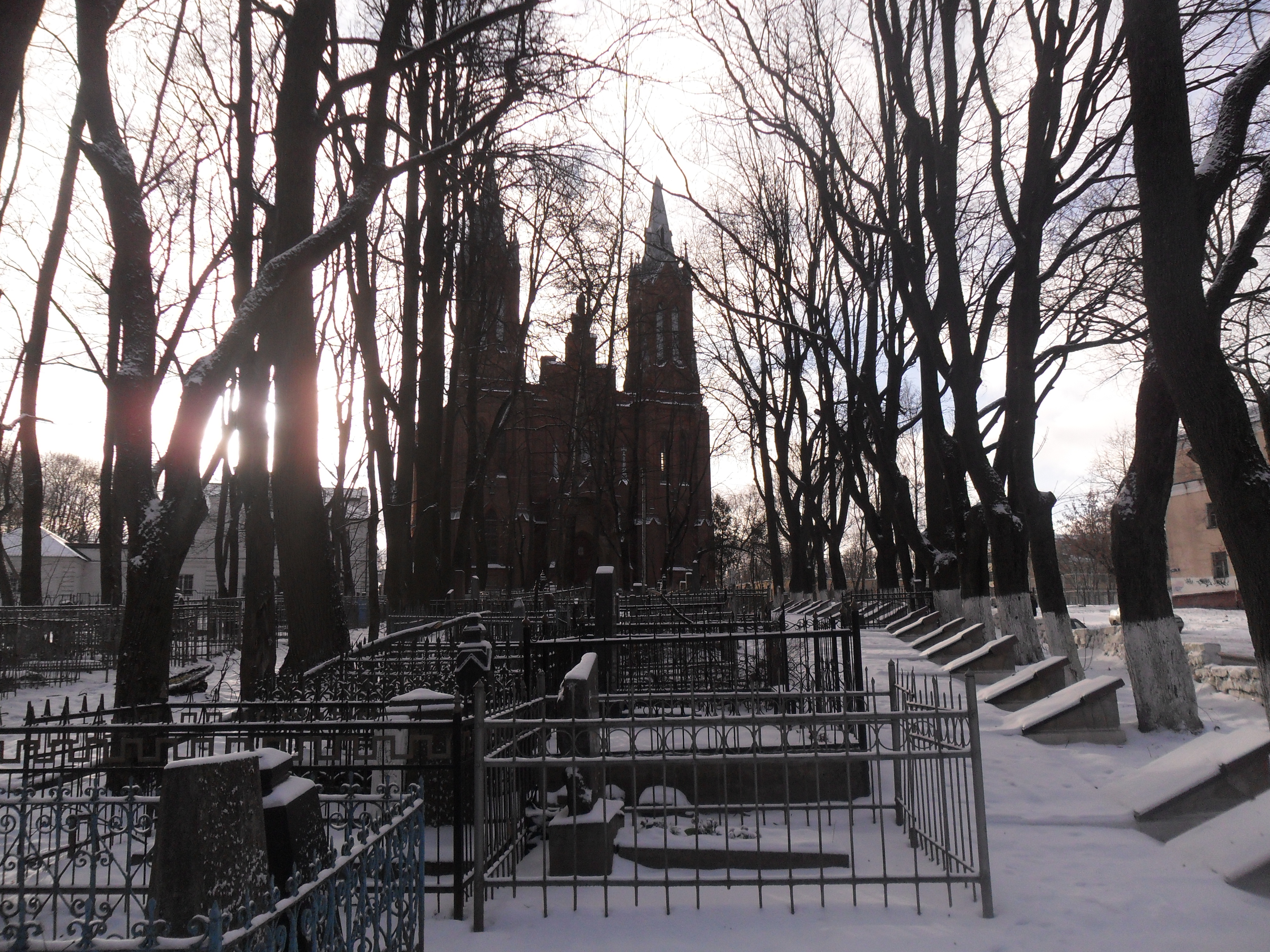
Polish Catholic cemetery in Smolensk

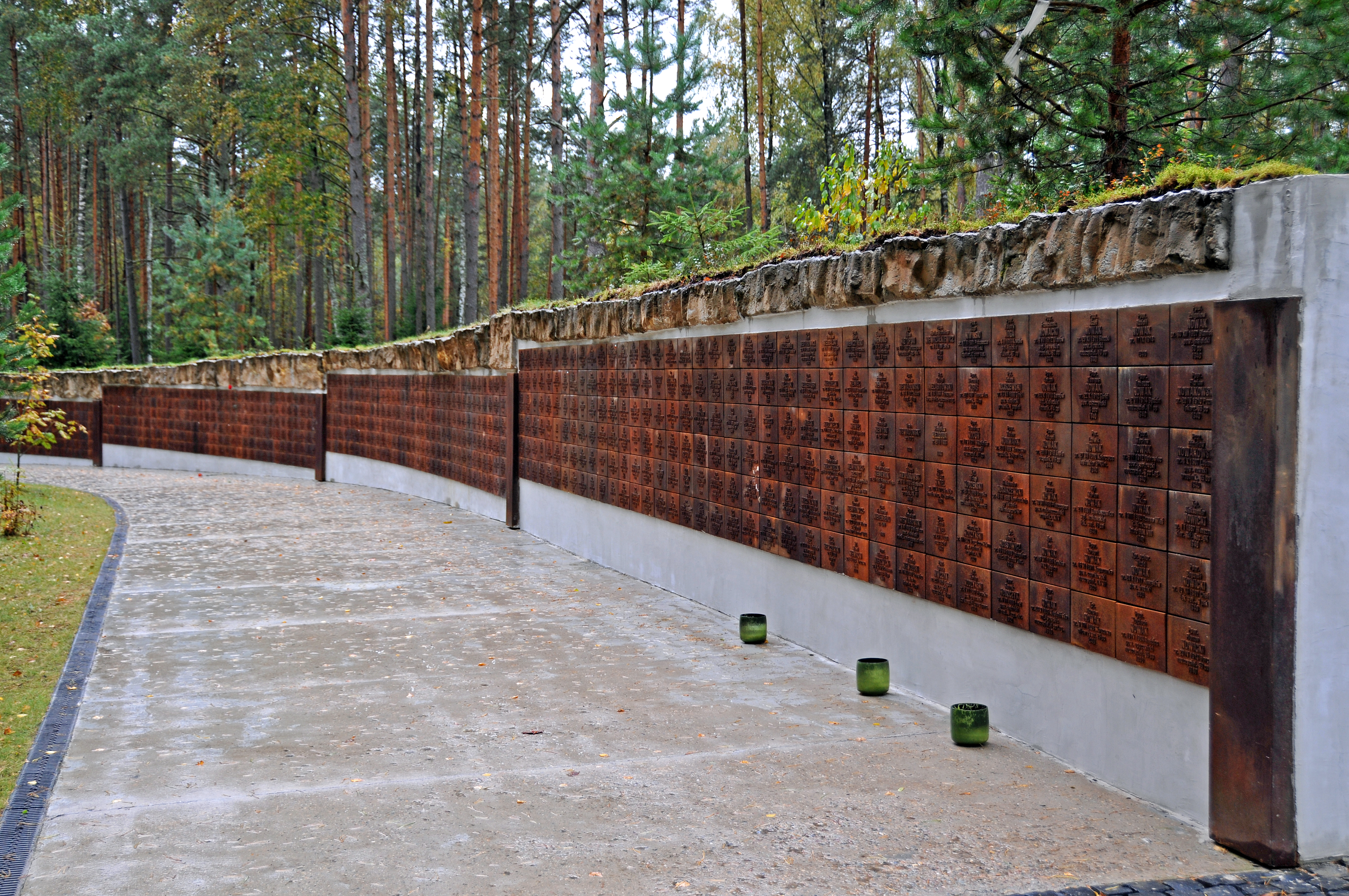
Katyn war cemetery

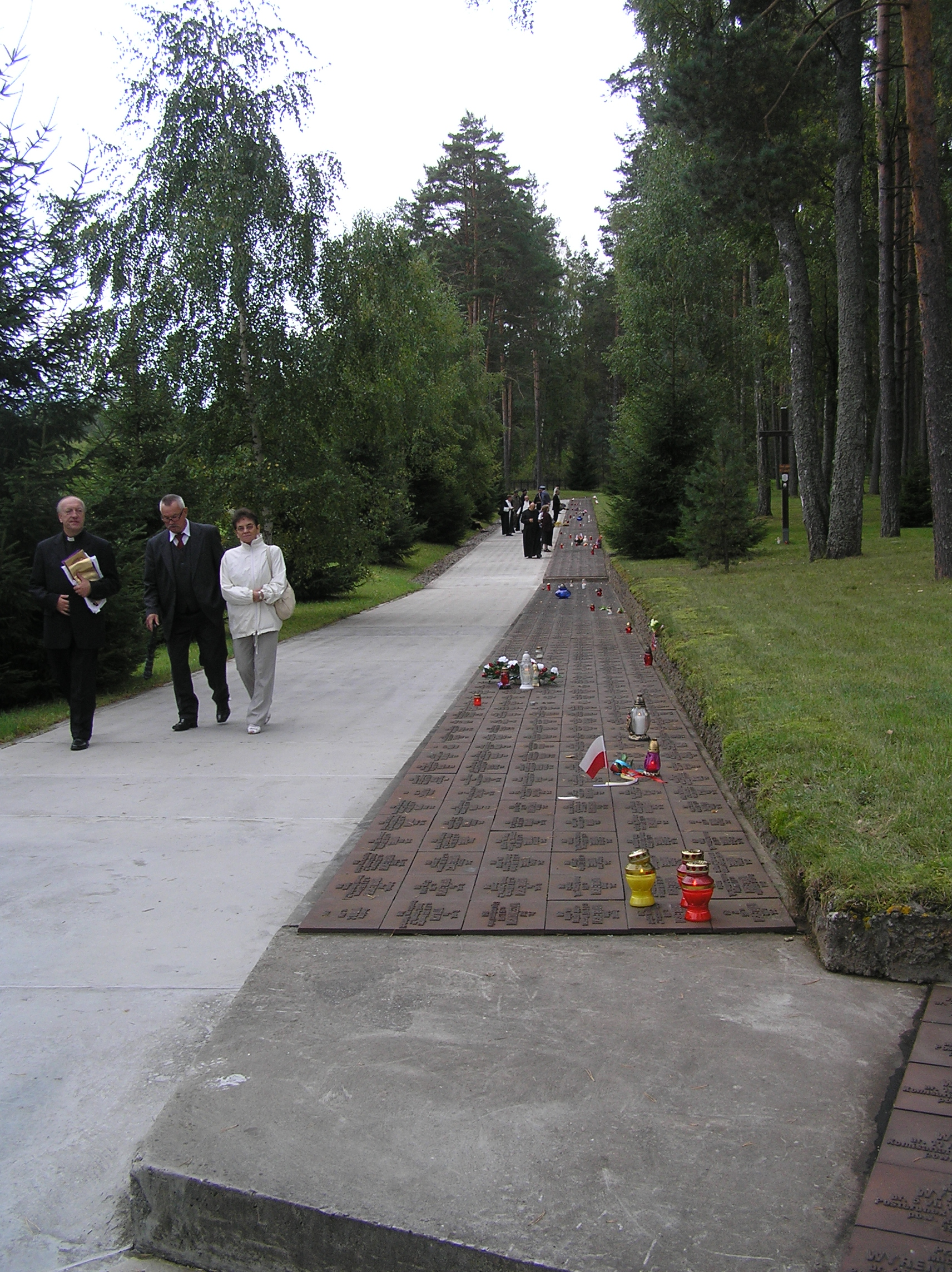
Polish War Cemetery in Mednoye

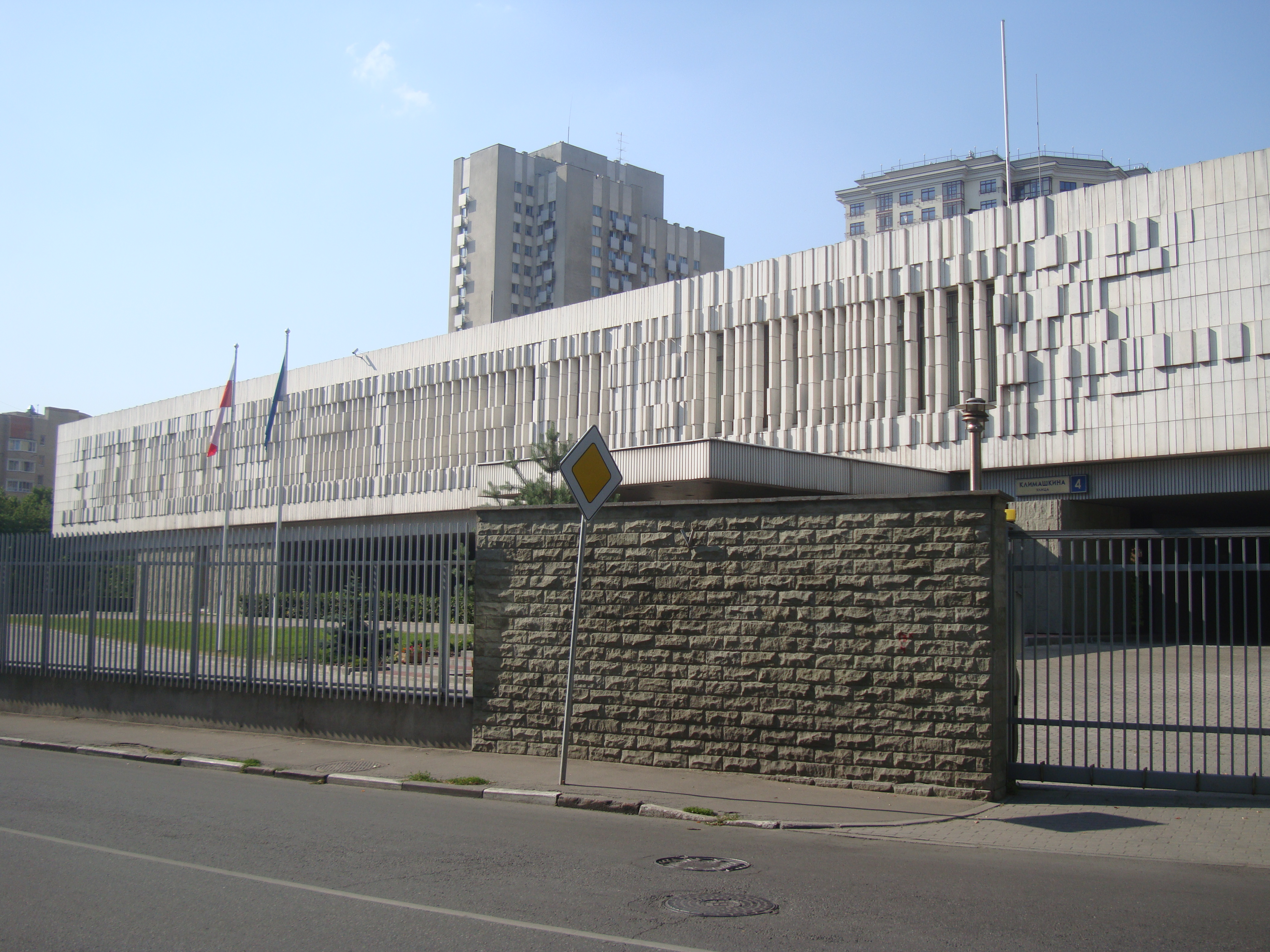
Embassy of Poland in Moscow

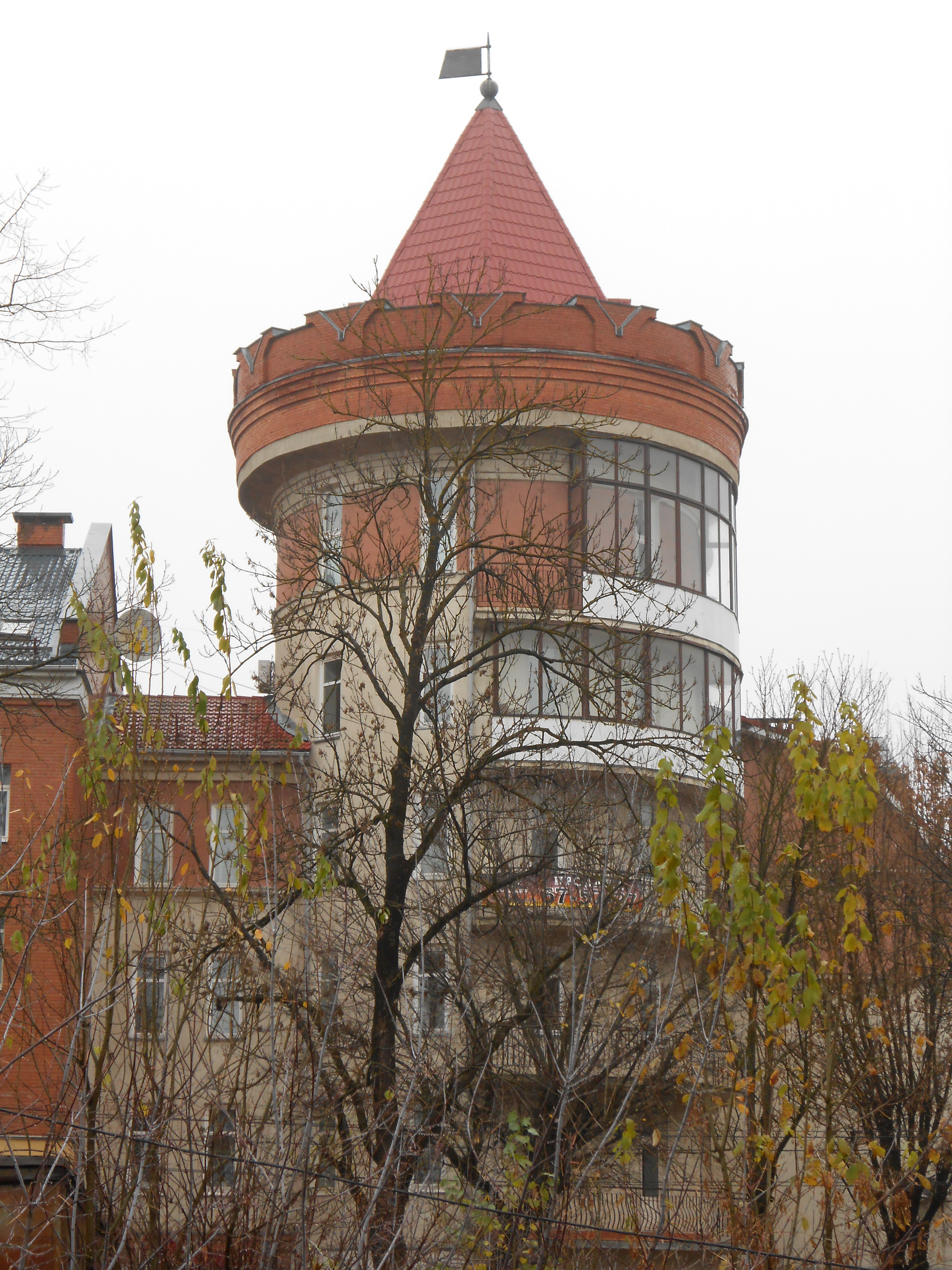
Polish Consulate in Smolensk

== Notable people of Polish descent in Russia ==
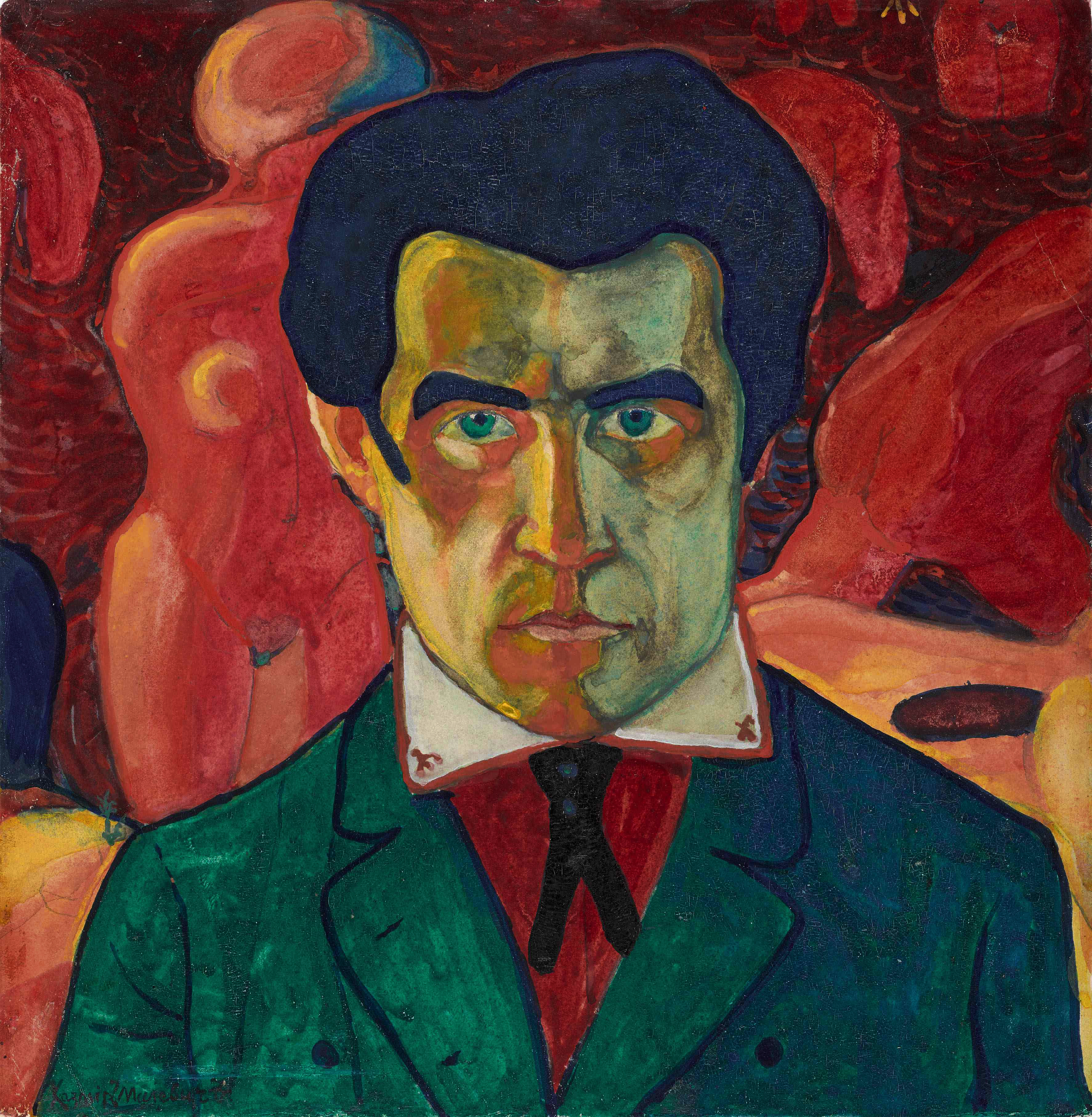
Painter Kazimir Malevich was a prominent Polish-Russian artist.

- Aleksandr Verzhbilovich, classical cellist
- Mikhail Vielgorsky - Imperial official and composer
- Matvei Wielhorski - cellist and count
- Adam Jerzy Czartoryski, statesman, diplomat and author. Foreign Minister of the Russian Empire (1804–1806)
- Alexander Rzewuski, general.
- Sofya Kovalevskaya, mathematician who made noteworthy contributions to analysis, partial differential equations and mechanics
- Włodzimierz Spasowicz - lawyer often acclaimed as the most brilliant defense attorney of Imperial Russia
- Dmitri Shostakovich, composer and pianist.
- Catherine I of Russia, Empress of Russia
- Konstantin Tsiolkovsky, Russian and Soviet rocket scientist and pioneer of the astronautic theory.
- Nikolay Raevsky, Russian general and statesman who achieved fame for his feats of arms during the Napoleonic Wars.
- Sigizmund Levanevsky, Soviet pioneer of long-range flight who was awarded the title Hero of the Soviet Union in 1934 for his role in the SS Chelyuskin rescue.
- Jan Nagórski, engineer and pioneer of aviation, the first person to fly an airplane in the Arctic and the first aviator to perform a loop with a flying boat.
- Stanisław Kosior, First Secretary of the Ukrainian Communist Party, deputy prime minister of the USSR and member of the Politburo of the Communist Party of the Soviet Union (CPSU).
- Felix Dzerzhinsky, Bolshevik and Director of Cheka
- Vyacheslav Menzhinsky Bolshevik revolutionary, a Soviet statesman and Party official who served as chairman of the OGPU from 1926 to 1934.
- Józef Unszlicht, Bolshevik revolutionary activist, one of the founders of the Cheka and Soviet government official.
- Gleb Krzhizhanovsky, Soviet Scientist، revolutionary and a state figure as well as a geographer and writer.
- Mathilde Kschessinska, ballerina and lover of Nicholas II of Russia
- Nikolai Lobachevsky, mathematician and geometer
- Kazimir Malevich, painter
- Robert Rozhdestvensky, Soviet-Russian poet and Songwriter who broke with socialist realism in the 1950s–1960s during the Khrushchev Thaw.
- Nikolay Lossky, Russian Empire philosopher, representative of Russian idealism, intuitionist epistemology, personalism, libertarianism, ethics and axiology (value theory).
- Vaslav Nijinsky, ballet dancer
- Nikolay Przhevalsky, geographer
- Konstantin Rokossovsky, Marshal of the Soviet Union and Marshal of Poland
- Fyodor Stravinsky, bass opera singer and actor
- Igor Stravinsky, composer and pianist
- Mikhail Brin, father of Russian-American inventor Sergey Brin
- Yanina Zhejmo, Soviet actress
- Weronika Książkiewicz - actress
- Irena Malkiewicz - actress
- Aleksander Waszkiewicz – Soviet military officer
- Aniela Krzywoń, the only woman in history who was not a citizen of the Soviet Union to be awarded the USSR's highest honor for bravery, the title Hero of the Soviet Union.
- Vikenty Veresaev (birth name Smidovich) – writer
- Vatslav Vorovsky (Wacław Worowski) – revolutionary, one of the first Soviet diplomats and head of the state publishing house
- Mechislav Kozlovsky – communist diplomat and lawyer
- Pyotr Suvchinsky - artistic patron and writer on music
- Stanislav Zhukovsky - painter and a member of Mir iskusstva
- Yury Olesha – writer
- Tomasz Dąbal – communist politician
- Karol Świerczewski – general, commander of the Polish Second Army during the fighting for western Poland and the Battle of Berlin
- Stanislav Poplavsky (Stanisław Popławski) – general, commander of the Polish First Army during the breakthrough of the Pommernstellung (Pomerania Wall) fortification line, securing the Baltic Sea coast, crossing the Odra and Elbe rivers and the battle of Berlin
- Andrey Vyshinsky (Andriej or Andrzej Wyszyński) – Prosecutor General of the USSR (1934–1939), the legal mastermind of Joseph Stalin's Great Purge
- Arseny Tarkovsky (Tarkowski) – poet and translator (with a father of Polish descent)
- Andrei Tarkovsky (Tarkowski) – film-maker, writer, film editor, film theorist, theatre and opera director (with a paternal grandfather of Polish descent)
- Dmitri Shostakovich (Szostakowicz) – composer (with a paternal grandfather of Polish descent)
- Rostislav Plyatt – actor (of mixed Polish-Ukrainian descent)
- Mstislav Rostropovich – cellist and conductor
- Edvard Radzinsky – playwright, TV personality
- Edita Piekha (Edyta Piecha) – singer, born in France, moved to USSR
- Anatoly Sobchak – mayor of Saint Petersburg (mixed Russian-Ukrainian-Polish-Czech descent)
- Ksenia Sobchak - journalist, media manager, television personality, and former politician
- Sergey Yastrzhembsky (Jastrzębski) – Russian politician, President Vladimir Putin's chief spokesperson on the Second Chechen War, head of the Kremlin's Information Policy Department, co-ordinating Putin administration's external communications.
- Konstantin Petrzhak – physicist
- Vladislav Strzhelchik – Soviet and Russian actor.
- Osip Kozlovsky – composer
- Leon Kovalsky - engineer politician
- Vatslav Dvorzhetsky – Soviet film and theater actor, People's Artist of the RSFSR (1991)
- Anatoly Kubatsky – Soviet stage and film actor
- Vyacheslav Shalevich - actor
- Mikhail Vrubel – Painter
- Yuri Loza - singer, poet, and composer
- Skarzhinsky, Nikolai Georgievich - Russian Major General (1849–1910).
- Tatyana Shmyga - operetta/musical theatre performer
- Skarzhinsky, Vasily Anastasievich - Russian Major General
- Skarzhinsky, Pyotr Mikhailovich - Major General, Cavalier of the Order of St. Vladimir of the 2nd degree and the Order of St. George of the 4th degree. Commander of the Astrakhan Cossack Regiment. He participated in the Russo-Turkish War of 1768-1774 and the Russo-Turkish War of 1787–1791
- Skarzhinsky, Nikolai Petrovich - lieutenant of the Izmailovo regiment, mortally wounded at Kulm (August 17, 1813), his name is listed on the wall of the Cathedral of Christ the Savior in Moscow.
- Skarzhinsky, Nikolai Vladimirovich (1910–1990) Soviet serviceman, who served in the Soviet 327th anti-tank battalion of the 253rd Rifle Division, was awarded the Order "For Courage" and the Order of Glory of the 3rd degree during the Great Patriotic War.
- Yevgeny Baratynsky - poet
- Yakov Povalo-Shveikovsky - Russian Imperial General of the Infantry (then the acting Privy Councillor)
- Władysław Romiszewski - General of the Infantry in Imperial Russian Army
- Vera Zasulich - Menshevik writer and revolutionary
- Józef Dowbor-Muśnicki - general in the Imperial Russian Army of World War I
- Wacław Iwaszkiewicz-Rudoszański - general in the Imperial Russian Army of World War I
- Antoni Listowski - general in the Imperial Russian Army of World War I
- Aleksander Romanowicz - general in the Imperial Russian Army of World War I
- Modest Romiszewski - general in the Imperial Russian Army of World War I
- Jan Rządkowski - general in the Imperial Russian Army of World War I
- Leonard Skierski - general in the Imperial Russian Army of World War I
- Sylvester Stankievich - general in the Imperial Russian Army of World War I
- Tiffany Zahorski - ice dancer
- Franciszek Ksawery Branicki - general in the Imperial Russian Army
- Władysław Grzegorz Branicki - general in the Imperial Russian Army
- Wojciech Chrzanowski - general in the Imperial Russian Army
- Zachariasz Kieński - general in the Imperial Russian Army
- Ksawery Lubomirski - general in the Imperial Russian Army
- Stanisław Szczęsny Potocki - general in the Imperial Russian Army
- Oktawiusz Radoszkowski - general in the Imperial Russian Army
- Władysław Romiszewski - general in the Imperial Russian Army
- Adam Rzewuski - general in the Imperial Russian Army
- Edmund Świdziński - general in the Imperial Russian Army
- Vitold Tserasky - astronomer and inventor of astronomical tools and techniques
- Yan Kaminsky - former professional ice hockey player who played in the Soviet Championship League and National Hockey League between 1989 and 1995
- Ilya Darevsky - Soviet zoologist-herpetologist and a corresponding member of the Russian Academy of Sciences
- Pyotr Smidovich - revolutionary and Soviet politician
- Boguslav Kurlovich - scientific agronomist
- Mikhail Tsekhanovsky - Soviet artist, animation director, book illustrator, screenwriter, sculptor and educator
- Albert Starchevsky - literary historian, journalist, editor, philologist, lexicographer and encyclopedist
- Franciszek Duchiński - ethnographer and historian
- Marian Albertovich Kowalski - astronomer
- Jan Czerski - paleontologist, osteologist, geologist, geographer and explorer of Siberia
- Leonard Jaczewski - geologist, geographer, engineer and explorer of Siberia
- Adam Szymański - writer and lawyer
- Zorian Dołęga-Chodakowski - ethnographer and archaeologist
- Ladislaus Bortkiewicz - economist and statistician
- Zygmunt Balicki - sociologist
- Józef Wojciechowski (physician)
- Vsevolod Krestovsky - writer who worked in the city mysteries genre
- Leonid Kamarovsky - professor of international law at Moscow State University
- Nikolai Kulchitsky - anatomist and histologist, the last Minister of Education of the Russian Empire
- Jan Prosper Witkiewicz - orientalist, explorer and diplomat serving the Russian Empire
- Osip Senkovsky - orientalist, journalist and entertainer
- Bronislava Nijinska - ballet dancer
- Leon Wasilewski - activist of the Polish Socialist Party (PPS), a coworker of Józef Piłsudski, Polish Minister of Foreign Affairs, designer of much of Second Polish Republic policy towards Eastern Europe, historian and father of Halszka Wasilewska and of Wanda Wasilewska
- Stanisław Krusiński - economist, sociologist and political activist
- Boleslav Markevich - writer, essayist, journalist, and literary critic
- Boleslav Mlodzeevskii - mathematician, a former president of the Moscow Mathematical Society
- Yan Rachinsky - human rights activist, programmer and mathematician
- Vadim Tsymburskiy - Soviet and Russian philosopher, researcher of geographical politics, philologist, historian and linguist, Homeric Scholar, Etruscologist, Hittitologist, and political scientist
- Nina Pigulevskaya - Soviet historian and orientalist
- Grigory Grum-Grshimailo - zoologist best known for his expeditions to Central Asia (Pamir, Bukhara, Tianshan, Gansu, and Kukunor), western Mongolia and Tuva, and the Russian Far East
- Lev Artsimovich - Soviet physicist known for his contributions to the Tokamak— a device that produces controlled thermonuclear fusion power
- Tadeusz Jaczewski - entomologist
- Vladimir Volsky - revolutionary with a Narodnik orientation
- Karol Świerczewski - Red army general
- Roman Malinovsky - prominent Bolshevik politician before the Russian Revolution, while at the same time working as the best-paid agent for the Okhrana, the Tsarist secret police
- Stanisław Bobiński - Soviet communist politician, journalist and military commander
- Julian Leszczyński - political activist, publicist, and leader of the Stalinist faction in the Communist Party of Poland (KPP)
- Ivan Teodorovich - the first Commissar for Food at the establishment of the Council of People's Commissars (October–November 1917)
- Igor Kovalevsky - Catholic priest, general secretary of the Conference of Catholic Bishops of Russia from 1999 to 2020, the administrator parish of Saints Peter and Paul Cathedral in Moscow, director of Caritas in the European Part of Russia
- Jerzy Bordziłowski - Soviet military officer and communist politician
- Romuald Muklevich - Soviet military figure and Commander-in-Chief of the Soviet Naval Forces from August 1926 to July 1931
- Antoni Mroczkowski - ace pilot in the Imperial Russian Air Force during the World War I with at least 5 confirmed kills
- Arseny Zakrevsky - statesman and Minister of the Interior from April 19, 1828, to November 19, 1831
- Ignaty Przybyszewski - lieutenant general
- Fyodor Radetsky - Russian Imperial general
- Pavel Bashutsky - General of the Infantry of the Russian Empire
- Mikhail Kakhovsky - senior Russian general who led the imperial army to a rapid victory in the Polish–Russian War of 1792
- Yulia Yuzik - journalist and non-fiction writer
- Vladimir Sollogub - minor Russian writer, author of novelettes, essays, plays, and memoirs
- Vladimir Izdebskiy - sculptor
- Józef Oleszkiewicz - painter, active in Saint Petersburg during Tsar Alexander I's reign, known primarily for his portraits and his eccentric behavior
- Yuri Mazurok - Soviet operatic baritone
- Valery Obodzinsky - Soviet and Russian singer (tenor), a holder of the title of Meritorious Artist Mari Autonomous Soviet Socialist Republic (1973)
- Witold Maliszewski - composer
- Nikolai Myaskovsky - composer
- Ivan Laskovsky - composer
- Vladimir Valutsky - screenwriter
- Ieronim Yasinsky - novelist
- Georgy Adamovich - poet
- Vadim Shershenevich - poet
- Stanislav Rostotsky - film director

== See also ==
- Poland–Russia relations
- Poles in Kaliningrad
- Russian minority in Poland
