= Edmund Świdziński =

Polish-Russian general (1848–1919)

Edmund Ferdinandovich Svidzinsky
- Edmund Świdziński
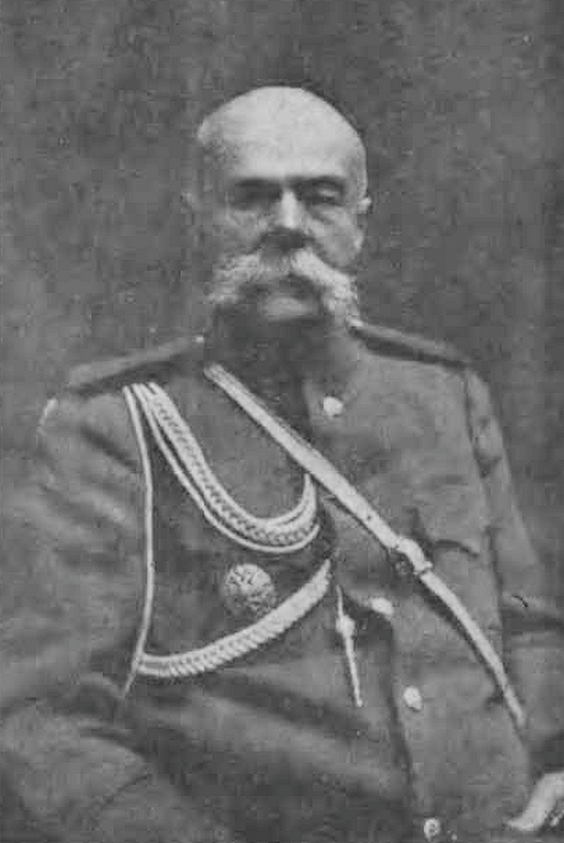
- Born: 27 November [O.S. 15 November] 1848; Kalisz, Warsaw Governorate, Russian Empire
- Died: 1919; Kyiv, Ukrainian People's Republic
- Military career
- Allegiance: Russian Empire
- Branch: Imperial Russian Army
- Service years: 1867–1911
- Rank: General of the Infantry

Edmund Ferdinandovich Svidzinsky (Russian: Эдмунд Фердинандович Свидзинский; Polish: Edmund Świdziński; 27 November [O.S. 15 November] 1848 – 1919), was a General of the Infantry in the Imperial Russian Army.

== Biography ==
Born on 15 (27) November 1848, Świdziński received his education at the 1st Moscow Cadet Corps in 1865 and later attended the 3rd Alexander Military School in 1867, graduating as a second lieutenant in the 98th Dorpat Infantry Regiment. Serving as a company commander from 5 January 1873 to 4 July 1879, he then pursued further education at the General Staff Academy. Following his studies, he joined the General Staff (2nd category) in 1882. His military assignments included serving as an officer at the headquarters of the Omsk Military District from 24 November 1882 to 30 March 1884. Subsequently, he served as senior adjutant at the headquarters of the 9th Infantry Division from 30 March 1884 to 13 April 1886, and as a staff officer for special assignments at the headquarters of the 10th Army Corps from 13 April 1886 to 14 September 1889. Świdziński was promoted to colonel on 16 November 1887.

From 1889 to 1892, he was a teacher at the Elisavetgrad Junker School.

Świdziński was appointed as chief of staff of the 21st Infantry Division on 19 September 1892, but on 29 October of the same year, he was transferred to the same position in the 38th Infantry Division. From 22 August 1894, he served as chief of staff of the 20th Infantry Division.

From 16 March 1899, Świdziński commanded the Old Russian Infantry Regiment. He was promoted to major general on 19 May 1900 and appointed commander of the 1st Brigade of the 19th Infantry Division. On 16 August 1901, he took command the 2nd Brigade of the 42nd Infantry Division.

From 21 November 1908, Świdziński served as Lieutenant General and head of the 11th Infantry Division in Lutsk. From 19 June 1910, he was head of the 41st Infantry Division in Kazan. He retired on 16 November 1911 as an infantry general.

Świdziński served as the head of the organizing committee of the Puławy Legion, formed in 1915, but soon transferred command to Piotr Szymanowski and departed for Kyiv. After the Russian Revolution, he actively participated in the Union of Polish Militaryists (Związek Wojskowych Polaków). He supported the creation of a Polish corps in Russia and edited the military magazine "Troop Vedomosti" (Wiadomości Wojskowe) in Kyiv, where he authored numerous articles.

Svidzinsky appeared in the military press with articles on topical issues of army life, military education, and the development of military knowledge.

== Awards ==
- Order of St. Stanislaus, 3rd Class, 1873; 2nd Class, 1885; 1st Class, 1905
- Order of St. Anne, 3rd Class, 1879; 2nd Class, 1889
- Order of St. Vladimir, 4th Class, 1896; 3rd Class, 1903
- Cross of Independence (posthumously in 1932, No. 702)

== Family ==
Świdziński was married to Maria Boleslavovna Burnevich and had three children. The marriage was subsequently dissolved.
