= Stanisław Krusiński =

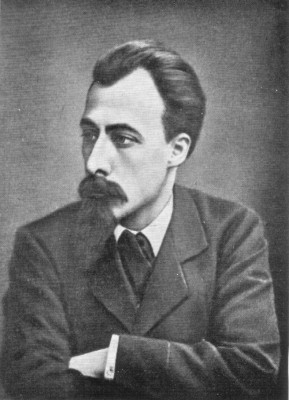
Stanisław Krusiński

Stanisław Krusiński (1 May 1857, Posiołkach, Saratov Governorate – 24 January 1886, Kazan) was a Polish economist, sociologist and political activist. One of the first Polish Marxists. With his colleagues (such as Ludwik Krzywicki), he translated Karl Marx's Capital into Polish.
