= Zachariasz Kieński =

Polish military officer

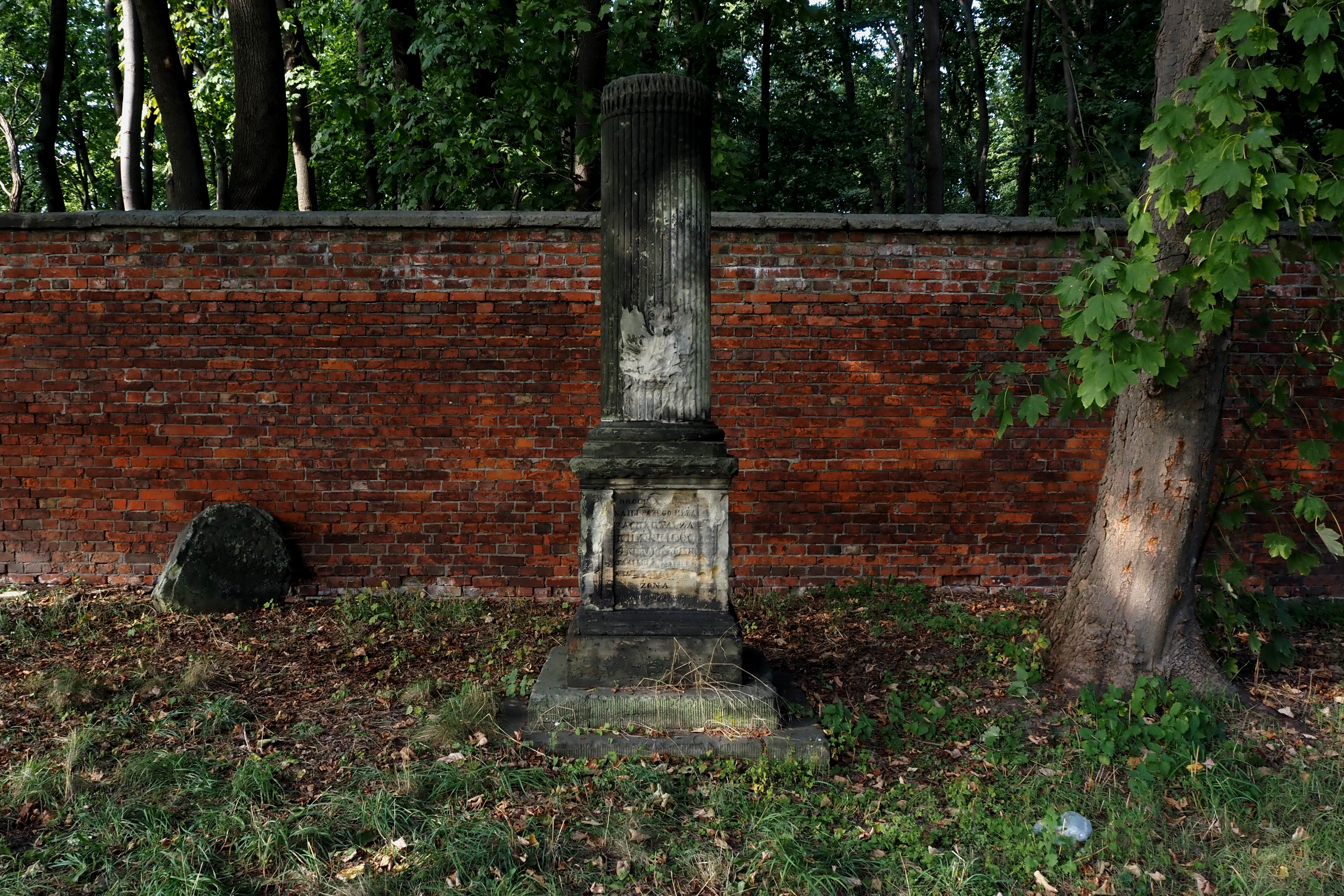
- The grave of Zachariasz Kieński, at the Muslim Caucasian Cemetery in Warsaw, Poland in 2023.

Personal details
- Died: 1857 Pisa, Grand Duchy of Tuscany (now part of Italy)
- Resting place: Muslim Caucasian Cemetery, Warsaw, Poland
- Spouse: Wilhelmina Kieńska

Military service
- Allegiance: Russian Empire
- Branch/service: Imperial Russian Army
- Rank: Major general

Zachariasz Kieński (Polish: [zaˈxa.rjaʂ ˈkjɛɲ.ski]; died 1857) was a Polish military officer, and a major general of the Imperial Russian Army.

== Biography ==
Zachariasz Kieński was a major general of the Imperial Russian Army in the 19th century. During his service, he was awarded with numerous orders and honours. He was married to Wilhelmina Kieńska (née Pahlen).

Kieński died in 1857, in Pisa, Grand Duchy of Tuscany (now part of Italy). His body was buried in Warsaw, Congress Poland, Russian Empire (now part of Poland), at the Muslim Caucasian Cemetery. His wife was buried in the same grave.
