= Władysław Romiszewski =

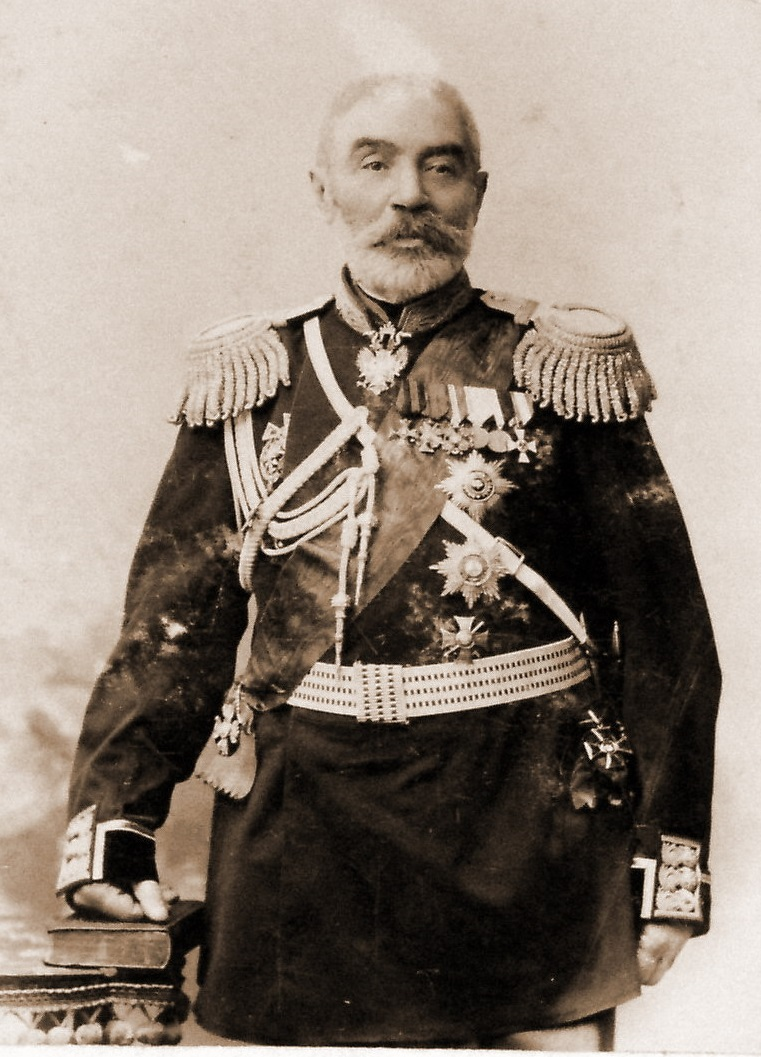
- Born: 1818; Podolia, Russian Empire
- Died: 1907 (aged 88–89); Warsaw, Poland
- Spouse: Anna Djakeli (Jaqeli)
- Military career
- Rank: General of Infantry

Władysław Romiszewski (1818–1907) was a General of the Infantry of Polish descent in Imperial Russian Army.

Władysław Romiszewski came from an old Polish noble family of the Jelita heraldic clan and was born in Podolia. He was the son of Feliks, state councillor, and Honorata (née Kożuchowska). He had two brothers, Lucjan, a landowner in Podolia, and Aleksander, a colonel in Imperial Russian Army.

He graduated from the Imperial Nicholas Military Academy in 1842 and reached the ranks of major general in 1863, lieutenant general in 1871 and general of infantry in 1886. He died October 29, 1907, in Warsaw and is buried at the Powązki Cemetery.

He was married to Anna Djakeli (Jaqeli), who was of Georgian descent, and was the father of General Modest Romiszewski.
