= Modest Romiszewski =

Polish general

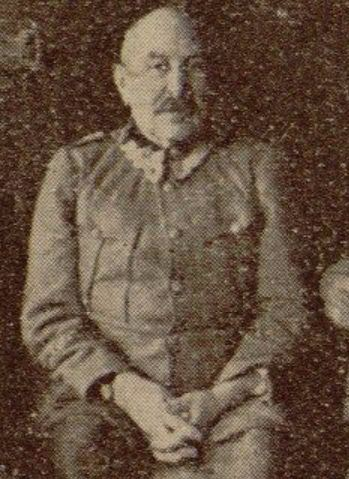
- Born: 29 July 1861
- Died: 7 October 1930 (aged 69)
- Buried: Powązki Cemetery
- Allegiance: Russian Empire; Poland
- Branch: Imperial Russian Army; Polish Army
- Children: 4

Modest Romiszewski (29 July 1861, in Warsaw – 7 October 1930, in Warsaw) was a Polish general, son of Imperial Russian Army general Władysław Romiszewski and Anna Dżakeli. Reached the rank of general in 1913. Since 29 December 1918 general in the Polish Army (Wojsko Polskie). A military theorist, transferred to reserve on 6 May 1921. He is buried at Powązki Cemetery in Warsaw. He was married, and had four children.
